= List of Padma Shri award recipients (1970–1979) =

Recipients of a civilian award in India

Padma Shri
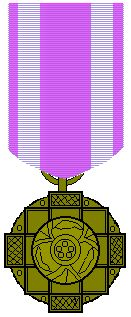
- Type: National Civilian
- Country: India
- Presented by: Government of India
- Ribbon
- Obverse: A centrally located lotus flower is embossed and the text "Padma" written in Devanagari script is placed above and the text "Shri" is placed below the lotus.
- Reverse: A platinum State Emblem of India placed in the centre with the national motto of India, "Satyameva Jayate" (Truth alone triumphs) in Devanagari Script
- Established: 1954
- First award: 1954

Highlights
- Total: 494

Precedence
- Next (higher): Padma Bhushan

Padma Shri Award, India's fourth highest civilian honours – Winners, 1970–1979:

== Recipients ==
Award recipients by year
Year	Number of recipients
1970	69
1971	84
1972	89
1973	62
1974	57
1975	43
1976	55
1977	35
1978	0
1979	0

Award recipients by field
Field	Number of recipients
Arts	107
Civil Service	95
Literature & Education	90
Medicine	59
Public Affairs	7
Science & Engineering	44
Social Work	59
Sports	18
Trade & Industry	15

Key
# Indicates a posthumous honour

List of Padma Shri award recipients
Year	Recipient	Field	State
1970	Ghulam Ahmad Bandey	Science & Engineering	Jammu & Kashmir
1970	Ananda Chandra Barua	Literature & Education	Assam
1970	Ajit Kumar Basu	Medicine	West Bengal
1970	Bishan Singh Bedi	Sports	Delhi
1970	Sunil Kumar Bhattacharya	Civil Service	West Bengal
1970	Sukumar Bose	Arts	Delhi
1970	Indumati Chimanlal Sheth	Social Work	Gujarat
1970	Phul Chand	Trade & Industry	West Bengal
1970	Siddheshwar Shastri Chitrav	Literature & Education	Maharashtra
1970	Dattatraya Mahadeo Dahanukar	Trade & Industry	Maharashtra
1970	Lakshman Swarup Darbari	Civil Service	Delhi
1970	Din Dayal	Literature & Education	Punjab
1970	Chandra David Devanasan	Literature & Education	Tamil Nadu
1970	Prem Dhawan	Arts	Maharashtra
1970	Ramesh Tribhuvandas Doshi	Science & Engineering	Maharashtra
1970	Sohan Lal Dwivedi	Literature & Education	Uttar Pradesh
1970	Ratna Fabri	Arts	Rajasthan
1970	Gemini Ganesan	Arts	Tamil Nadu
1970	Ritwik Ghatak	Arts	West Bengal
1970	Purshottam Pandurang Gokhale	Social Work	Maharashtra
1970	Coluthur Gopalan	Medicine	Delhi
1970	Ghanshyam Das Goyal	Social Work	Karnataka
1970	Govind Ram Hada	Trade & Industry	Delhi
1970	Syed Mohd. Moinul Haq	Sports	Bihar
1970	Kunnenkeril K. Jacob	Literature & Education	Maharashtra
1970	Jiwan Lal Jairamdas	Social Work	Delhi
1970	Damayanti Joshi	Arts	Maharashtra
1970	Maniben Kara	Social Work	Maharashtra
1970	Abdul Halim Jaffer Khan	Arts	Maharashtra
1970	Alice Wilma Khan	Social Work	– (Note: Indicates a citizen of Switzerland)
1970	Karl Jamshed Khandalavala	Arts	Maharashtra
1970	Madhaviah Krishnan	Arts	Tamil Nadu
1970	Rajendra Kumar	Arts	Maharashtra
1970	Purushottama Lal	Literature & Education	West Bengal
1970	Lilian G. Lutter	Literature & Education	Madhya Pradesh
1970	T. R. Mahalingam	Arts	Tamil Nadu
1970	Gurudas Mal	Civil Service	Delhi
1970	Ram Chatur Mallick	Arts	Bihar
1970	Mallikarjun Mansur	Arts	Karnataka
1970	Ezra Mir	Arts	Maharashtra
1970	Kumud Ranjan Mullick	Literature & Education	West Bengal
1970	Pankaj Mullick	Arts	West Bengal
1970	Mohan Nayak	Social Work	Odisha
1970	Kalamandalam Krishnan Nair	Arts	Kerala
1970	P. Narasimhayya	Literature & Education	Karnataka
1970	Shantilal B. Pandya	Science & Engineering	Delhi
1970	Pisharoth Rama Pisharoty	Science & Engineering	Gujarat
1970	E. A. S. Prasanna	Sports	Karnataka
1970	Relangi	Arts	Andhra Pradesh
1970	Gummadi	Arts	Andhra Pradesh
1970	Ghantasala	Arts	Andhra Pradesh
1970	Vadalmudi Venkata Rao	Literature & Education	Assam
1970	Vijay Raghav Rao	Arts	West Bengal
1970	Perugu Siva Reddy	Medicine	Andhra Pradesh
1970	Phanishwar Nath Renu	Literature & Education	Bihar
1970	Weer Rajendra Rishi	Literature & Education	Punjab
1970	Masud Hassan Rizvi	Literature & Education	Uttar Pradesh
1970	Cuddalore Subramania Chetty Sadasivan	Medicine	Andhra Pradesh
1970	Prem Prakash Sahni	Medicine	Delhi
1970	Devendra Nath Samant	Social Work	Bihar
1970	V. Satyanarayana Sarma	Arts	Andhra Pradesh
1970	Sumathiben Nemchand Shah	Literature & Education	Maharashtra
1970	Maisnam Amubi Singh	Arts	Manipur
1970	Narayan Singh	Civil Service	Rajasthan
1970	Rajendra Vir Singh	Medicine	Uttar Pradesh
1970	Badri Narain Sinha	Medicine	Uttar Pradesh
1970	K. B. Sundarambal	Arts	Tamil Nadu
1970	Avinash Vyas	Arts	Maharashtra
1970	D. S. Wagh	Social Work	Maharashtra
1970	Sikandar Ali Wajd	Literature & Education	Maharashtra
1971	Baba Amte	Social Work	Maharashtra
1971	M. Balamuralikrishna	Arts	Tamil Nadu
1971	Robin Banerjee	Social Work	Assam
1971	Lila Ramkumar Bhargava	Social Work	Uttar Pradesh
1971	Savita Behen	Social Work	Delhi
1971	Atmaram Raoji Bhat	Literature & Education	Maharashtra
1971	Sheila Bhatia	Literature & Education	Delhi
1971	Prabhashankar Ramachandra Bhatt	Social Work	Maharashtra
1971	Pramathanath Bishi	Literature & Education	West Bengal
1971	Sudhansu Kumar Chakravarty	Civil Service	Bihar
1971	Sankho Chaudhuri	Arts	Delhi
1971	Leslie Claudius	Sports	West Bengal
1971	Kum Subasini Jhunu Dasgupta	Civil Service	Delhi
1971	Manna Dey	Arts	Maharashtra
1971	Moti Lal Dhar	Science & Engineering	Uttar Pradesh
1971	Khailshanker Durlabhji	Trade & Industry	Rajasthan
1971	Suresh Chandra Dutta	Medicine	West Bengal
1971	Zafar Futehally	Science & Engineering	Maharashtra
1971	Amya Bhushan Das Gupta	Civil Service	Delhi
1971	Atul Chandra Hazarika	Literature & Education	Assam
1971	Vaidyanatha Vaidyasubramanya Iyer	Social Work	Tamil Nadu
1971	Pandurang Dharmaji Jadhav	Social Work	Maharashtra
1971	Jagmohan	Civil Service	Punjab
1971	Udaybhansinhji Natwarsinhji Jethwa	Trade & Industry	Gujarat
1971	Adya Jha	Social Work	Delhi
1971	Devi Sahai Jindal	Trade & Industry	Delhi
1971	Palaniandi Kandaswamy	Civil Service	Tamil Nadu
1971	Sundaram Krishnamurthi	Medicine	Tamil Nadu
1971	Devendra Lal	Science & Engineering	Gujarat
1971	Maqbool Ahmed Lari	Literature & Education	Uttar Pradesh
1971	Grace Mary Linnel#	Literature & Education	– (Note: Indicates a citizen of the United Kingdom)
1971	Sahir Ludhianvi	Literature & Education	Punjab
1971	Josh Malsiyani	Literature & Education	Punjab
1971	Sailen Manna	Sports	West Bengal
1971	Ramanath Iyer Mathrubbotham	Public Affairs	Tamil Nadu
1971	Ram Lal Mehta	Public Affairs	Delhi
1971	Ratan Shankar Mishra	Literature & Education	Uttar Pradesh
1971	Chandi Prasad Misra	Medicine	Delhi
1971	Sadasiv Misra	Civil Service	Odisha
1971	Tripti Mitra	Arts	West Bengal
1971	Ghaus Mohammad	Sports	Andhra Pradesh
1971	Hari Mohan	Medicine	Delhi
1971	Syed Mohd. Mirza Mohazzab	Literature & Education	Uttar Pradesh
1971	Coorg Narasimhaiengar Krishna Murthy	Trade & Industry	Uttar Pradesh
1971	Katty Venkataswami Naidu	Social Work	Tamil Nadu
1971	Vazhenkada Kunchu Nair	Arts	Kerala
1971	Satchindanand Keshav Nargundkar	Civil Service	Bihar
1971	Yelavarthy Nayudamma	Trade & Industry	Tamil Nadu
1971	Sulabha Panandikar	Literature & Education	Maharashtra
1971	Subramanyam Paramanandan	Civil Service	Delhi
1971	Krishan Swarup Pathak	Civil Service	Punjab
1971	Sakharam Abaji Pawar Patil	Social Work	Maharashtra
1971	Chenganoor Raman Pillai	Arts	Kerala
1971	K. N. Dandayudhapani Pillai	Arts	Tamil Nadu
1971	Chandgi Ram	Sports	Delhi
1971	Tiruvadi Venkataraman Ramamurti	Science & Engineering	Delhi
1971	Basavapatna Narayana Balakrishna Rao	Medicine	Karnataka
1971	Shanta Rao	Arts	Karnataka
1971	Devan Venkata Reddy	Trade & Industry	Andhra Pradesh
1971	Prem Nath Sahni	Trade & Industry	Punjab
1971	Kamaljit Sandhu	Sports	– (Note: Indicates a citizen of the United States)
1971	Krishnaswami Srinivas Sanjivi	Medicine	Tamil Nadu
1971	Trivandrum Kannusami Pillai Shanmugam	Arts	Tamil Nadu
1971	Ravi Shankar Sharma	Arts	Maharashtra
1971	Chingamban Kalachand Shastri	Literature & Education	Manipur
1971	Sistha Venkata Seetharama Shastry	Science & Engineering	Andhra Pradesh
1971	H. D. Shourie	Trade & Industry	Delhi
1971	Harbhajan Sinha	Science & Engineering	Delhi
1971	Mohan Singh	Public Affairs	Delhi
1971	Suresh Singh	Literature & Education	Uttar Pradesh
1971	Surya Deo Singh	Social Work	Rajasthan
1971	Yudhvir Singh	Social Work	Rajasthan
1971	Nirmal Chandra Sinha	Literature & Education	Delhi
1971	Kothamangalam Subbu	Literature & Education	Tamil Nadu
1971	S. G. Mahalingayyar Subramaniam	Literature & Education	Tamil Nadu
1971	Anand Raj Surana	Social Work	Delhi
1971	Gulam Rabbani Taban	Literature & Education	Delhi
1971	Gopal Narayan Thakkar	Literature & Education	Maharashtra
1971	Mary Theodosia	Literature & Education	Karnataka
1971	Siyaram Tiwari	Arts	Bihar
1971	Gundappa Viswanath	Sports	Karnataka
1971	Avabai Bomanji Wadia	Social Work	Maharashtra
1971	Harnam Das Wahi	Trade & Industry	Delhi
1971	Qadri Ragi Aziz Ahmed Khan Warsi	Arts	Andhra Pradesh
1972	Ved Prakash Agnihotri	Science & Engineering	Punjab
1972	Ramamurthi Badrinath	Civil Service	Delhi
1972	O. P. Bahl	Civil Service	Punjab
1972	Harsh Vardhan Bahuguna	Sports	Uttar Pradesh
1972	Badri Prasad Bajoria	Social Work	Uttar Pradesh
1972	Debdulal Bandopadhyaya	Civil Service	West Bengal
1972	Pradeep Kumar Banerjee	Civil Service	West Bengal
1972	Surindera Nath Banerjee	Arts	West Bengal
1972	Puran Lal Batra	Science & Engineering	Haryana
1972	Rajinder Singh Bedi	Literature & Education	Maharashtra
1972	Dharamvir Bharati	Literature & Education	Maharashtra
1972	Swaran Singh Boparai	Civil Service	Punjab
1972	Dorothy Chacko	Medicine	Delhi
1972	Harish Chandra	Civil Service	Delhi
1972	B. S. Chandrasekhar	Sports	Karnataka
1972	Thayil John Cherian	Medicine	Tamil Nadu
1972	Chiranjeet Chakraborty	Arts	Delhi
1972	Mohanmullji Chordia	Trade & Industry	Tamil Nadu
1972	Vassala Samant Choudhry	Medicine	Uttar Pradesh
1972	Himangshu Mohan Choudhury	Civil Service	Uttar Pradesh
1972	Phool Chand Chowdhary	Literature & Education	Delhi
1972	Charles Correa	Science & Engineering	Maharashtra
1972	Prabhu Dayal Dabriwala	Social Work	West Bengal
1972	Brajbir Saran Das	Civil Service	Delhi
1972	Girija Devi	Arts	Uttar Pradesh
1972	Vasudeo S. Gaitonde	Arts	Maharashtra
1972	Shalil Ghosh	Literature & Education	Maharashtra
1972	Surjit Singh Gujral	Civil Service	Delhi
1972	Sheikh Gulab	Civil Service	Madhya Pradesh
1972	Ishwar Chandra Gupta	Civil Service	Chandigarh
1972	Surender Bansi Dhar Gupta	Social Work	Delhi
1972	Hari Prasad Jaiswal	Civil Service	Karnataka
1972	Sunil Janah	Arts	Delhi
1972	Lalgudi Jayaraman	Arts	Tamil Nadu
1972	Bhimsen Joshi	Arts	Maharashtra
1972	Mahendra Kapoor	Arts	Maharashtra
1972	Amiya Bhuson Kar	Medicine	West Bengal
1972	Jagannath Krishna Kate	Literature & Education	Madhya Pradesh
1972	Sant Kaur	Medicine	Chandigarh
1972	Prithvi Nath Khoshoo	Medicine	Uttar Pradesh
1972	Shyam Nandan Prasad Kishore	Literature & Education	Bihar
1972	Kanta Saroop Krishen	Social Work	Chandigarh
1972	Vadakantara Subramania Krishnan	Literature & Education	Madhya Pradesh
1972	Ram Kumar	Arts	Delhi
1972	Jagdish Lal	Civil Service	Punjab
1972	Vishveshwar Nath Langer	Literature & Education	Delhi
1972	Mali	Social Work	Jammu & Kashmir
1972	Prem Nath Mehra	Science & Engineering	Chandigarh
1972	G. S. Melkote	Public Affairs	Odisha
1972	Hrishikesh Mukherjee	Arts	Maharashtra
1972	Karachur Lingappa Nanjappa	Civil Service	Delhi
1972	Puttaparthi Narayanacharyulu	Literature & Education	Andhra Pradesh
1972	Kamal Manti Naskar	Civil Service	West Bengal
1972	Dattatraya Nagappa Pai	Medicine	Maharashtra
1972	B. D. Pande	Civil Service	Uttar Pradesh
1972	Savitri Indrajit Parekh	Arts	Gujarat
1972	Leelavati Vinayak Phatak	Civil Service	Delhi
1972	Vazhuvoor B. Ramaiyah Pillai	Arts	Tamil Nadu
1972	Samta Prasad	Arts	Uttar Pradesh
1972	M. K. Radha	Arts	Tamil Nadu
1972	Raghu Rai	Arts	Delhi
1972	P. Ramanathan Rajgopal	Civil Service	Tamil Nadu
1972	Balasubramaniam Ramamurthi	Medicine	Tamil Nadu
1972	Iyyanki Venkata Ramanayya	Social Work	Andhra Pradesh
1972	Krishna Reddy	Arts	– (Note: Indicates a citizen of France)
1972	Waheeda Rehman	Arts	Maharashtra
1972	Juthika Roy	Arts	West Bengal
1972	Chandraprava Saikiani	Social Work	Assam
1972	Chander Sekhar Samal	Civil Service	West Bengal
1972	Balu Sankaran	Medicine	–
1972	Suchitra Sen	Arts	West Bengal
1972	K. C. Sengupta	Civil Service	West Bengal
1972	Homi Cawas Sethnas	Civil Service	Maharashtra
1972	T. A. Mudon Sharma	Arts	Manipur
1972	K. Kripal Singh	Science & Engineering	Punjab
1972	Rajinder Singh	Civil Service	Punjab
1972	Sukhbir Singh Badal	Civil Service	Chandigarh
1972	Vijay Singh	Civil Service	Rajasthan
1972	Badal Sarkar	Literature & Education	West Bengal
1972	Palahalli Sitaramiah	Social Work	Karnataka
1972	Mylai Ponnuswamy Sivagnanam	Literature & Education	Tamil Nadu
1972	Bhawani Prasad Tiwari	Literature & Education	Madhya Pradesh
1972	Kotti Narasimha Udupa	Medicine	Uttar Pradesh
1972	R. Marthanda Varma	Medicine	Karnataka
1972	Gubbi Veeranna	Arts	Karnataka
1972	Mary Verghese	Medicine	Tamil Nadu
1972	Virendra Verma	Literature & Education	Uttar Pradesh
1972	Virendra Verma	Literature & Education	Maharashtra
1972	Ajit Wadekar	Sports	Maharashtra
1972	Moreshwar Mangesh Wagle	Civil Service	Maharashtra
1973	Koka Simhadri Babu	Civil Service	Delhi
1973	Chandrashekhar Lohumi	Science & Engineering	Uttar Pradesh
1973	Jayantha Kumar Bagchi	Civil Service	West Bengal
1973	Penimangalore Appraya Bhatt	Civil Service	Maharashtra
1973	Boyi Bhimanna	Literature & Education	Andhra Pradesh
1973	Nandlal Lachmilal Bordia	Medicine	Madhya Pradesh
1973	Prabhakar Bhikaji Chitnis	Civil Service	Maharashtra
1973	Ranjit Ramachandra Rao Desai	Literature & Education	Maharashtra
1973	Sitara Devi	Arts	Maharashtra
1973	K. T. Dholakia	Medicine	Maharashtra
1973	Farokh Engineer	Sports	Maharashtra
1973	Raghunath Singh Gahlot	Civil Service	Delhi
1973	Balwant Gargi	Literature & Education	Chandigarh
1973	Fateh Chand Gera	Civil Service	Delhi
1973	Shyam Lal Gupta	Literature & Education	Uttar Pradesh
1973	Narendra Singh Jain	Medicine	Delhi
1973	Harischandra Kashnath Karve	Civil Service	Karnataka
1973	Yamunabai Vinayakarao Khadilkar	Civil Service	Maharashtra
1973	Shakoor Khan	Arts	Delhi
1973	Maddali Gopala Krishna	Civil Service	Uttarakhand
1973	V. Krishnamurthy	Civil Service	Tamil Nadu
1973	T. N. Krishnan	Arts	Tamil Nadu
1973	Salam Machhlisheri	Literature & Education	Delhi
1973	Kishan Maharaj	Arts	Uttar Pradesh
1973	Ramchand Kishindas Menda	Medicine	Maharashtra
1973	M. K. Krishna Menon	Medicine	Tamil Nadu
1973	Sulochana Mohan Lal Modi	Social Work	Maharashtra
1973	M. K. Malik Mohammad	Literature & Education	Kerala
1973	Debi Prasad Mukherjee	Civil Service	West Bengal
1973	Ramanathapuram C. S. Murugabhoopathy	Arts	Tamil Nadu
1973	P. N. Bhaskaran Nair	Civil Service	Delhi
1973	Thikkurissy Sukumaran Nair	Arts	Kerala
1973	Bhola Nath	Medicine	Uttar Pradesh
1973	Ramesh Nigam	Medicine	Delhi
1973	Jagdish Mitra Pahwa	Medicine	Uttar Pradesh
1973	Shankar Ramachandra Panhale	Social Work	Maharashtra
1973	N. Kesava Panikkar	Science & Engineering	Tamil Nadu
1973	Kumari Codanda Rohini Poovaiah	Social Work	Karnataka
1973	Atam Prakash	Medicine	Delhi
1973	Krishnan Raghavachari	Science & Engineering	Maharashtra
1973	Balasubramanian Ramadorai	Civil Service	Delhi
1973	R. V. Ramaswamy	Civil Service	Tamil Nadu
1973	Keshavamurthy Ramachandra Rao	Civil Service	Gujarat
1973	Balu Bhagvathar Sastrigal	Arts	Tamil Nadu
1973	Dalip Kumar Sengupta	Civil Service	West Bengal
1973	Bhagwant Javhermal Shahaney	Civil Service	Maharashtra
1973	Trilokinath Sharma	Civil Service	Uttar Pradesh
1973	Uma Sharma	Arts	Delhi
1973	Ijwant Singh	Public Affairs	Delhi
1973	S. G. Thakur Singh	Arts	Punjab
1973	Shamsher Singh	Civil Service	Maharashtra
1973	Kamal Krishna Sinha	Civil Service	Bihar
1973	Prabhashankar Oghadbhai Sompura	Science & Engineering	Gujarat
1973	Chinnaswamy Rajan Subramanian	Civil Service	Karnataka
1973	Govind Swarup	Science & Engineering	Karnataka
1973	Prakash Narain Tandon	Medicine	Delhi
1973	Sridhar Upadhyay	Civil Service	Uttarakhand
1973	Cooverbai Jahangir Vakil	Literature & Education	Maharashtra
1973	Sarojini Varadappan	Social Work	Tamil Nadu
1973	Jamshed Vazifdar	Medicine	Maharashtra
1973	Venkataraman Krishnan Vengurlekar	Civil Service	Maharashtra
1973	Govindappa Venkataswamy	Medicine	Tamil Nadu
1973	R. Ranchandra Vishwanath Wardekar	Medicine	Maharashtra
1974	Kaifi Azmi	Literature & Education	Uttar Pradesh
1974	Subramanya Iyer Balakrishnan	Civil Service	Delhi
1974	Himanshu Kumar Banerjee	Civil Service	West Bengal
1974	Maryam Begum	Civil Service	Jammu & Kashmir
1974	Masuma Begum	Social Work	Andhra Pradesh
1974	Pushkar Bhan	Arts	Jammu & Kashmir
1974	Queenie H. C. Captain	Social Work	Maharashtra
1974	Mani Madhava Chakyar	Arts	Kerala
1974	Mani Kumar Chetri	Medicine	West Bengal
1974	Baldev Raj Chopra	Civil Service	– (Note: Indicates a citizen of Afghanistan)
1974	Bindhyabasini Devi	Arts	Bihar
1974	Naina Devi	Arts	Delhi
1974	Gopal Chandra Dutt	Civil Service	Delhi
1974	Nagarur Gopinath	Medicine	Delhi
1974	Indra Kumar Gupta	Civil Service	Delhi
1974	Jogindra Lal Gupta	Medicine	Delhi
1974	Ali Hasan	Civil Service	Uttar Pradesh
1974	Ram Prasad Choudhary Jaiswal	Science & Engineering	Bihar
1974	Hanamant Narhar 'Sudhanshu' Joshi	Social Work	Maharashtra
1974	Kooram Chakravarthy Kannan	Civil Service	Andhra Pradesh
1974	Achyut Purushottam Kanvinde	Science & Engineering	Delhi
1974	Girish Karnad	Arts	Karnataka
1974	Jagmohan Lal Karoli	Social Work	Uttar Pradesh
1974	Raj Raj Kumar Khanna	Civil Service	Delhi
1974	Thomas Kunnunkal	Literature & Education	Kerala
1974	Shriram Lagoo	Arts	Maharashtra
1974	Gulam Qadir Lala	Trade & Industry	Jammu & Kashmir
1974	Suchitra Mitra	Science & Engineering	West Bengal
1974	Dinesh Mohan	Civil Service	Uttarakhand
1974	Kelucharan Mohapatra	Arts	Odisha
1974	Hari Narain	Civil Service	Andhra Pradesh
1974	Maheswar Neog	Literature & Education	Kerala
1974	Nutan	Arts	Maharashtra
1974	Devki Nandan Pande	Social Work	Uttarakhand
1974	Waman Dattatreya Patwardhan	Trade & Industry	Maharashtra
1974	Thiruvizhimazhalai Subramania Pillai	Arts	Tamil Nadu
1974	L. S. N. Prasad	Medicine	Bihar
1974	Syed Zahoor Qasim	Civil Service	Delhi
1974	Satyanarayana Rajguru	Literature & Education	Odisha
1974	Kadiyala Ramachandra	Medicine	Tamil Nadu
1974	M. D. Ramanathan	Arts	Kerala
1974	C. N. R. Rao	Science & Engineering	Uttar Pradesh
1974	Kalluri Gopal Rao	Civil Service	Karnataka
1974	Mysore Shrikanta Pandit Nilkanta Rao	Medicine	Maharashtra
1974	Som Nath Sadhu	Arts	Jammu & Kashmir
1974	Emani Sankara Sastry	Arts	Delhi
1974	Qazi Abdul Sattar	Literature & Education	Uttar Pradesh
1974	Sitimon Sawain	Social Work	Meghalaya
1974	Kripal Singh Shekhawat	Arts	Rajasthan
1974	Anant Gopal Sheorey	Literature & Education	Maharashtra
1974	Ishrat Ali Siddiqui	Literature & Education	Uttar Pradesh
1974	Joginder Singh	Sports	Delhi
1974	Shivmangal Singh Suman	Literature & Education	Madhya Pradesh
1974	Venkatarama Narayana Swamy	Medicine	Tamil Nadu
1974	Sitaram Rao Valluri	Science & Engineering	Karnataka
1974	Manik Varma	Arts	Maharashtra
1974	Jothi Venkatachalam	Public Affairs	Tamil Nadu
1975	Suraj Mal Agrawal	Civil Service	Delhi
1975	Arjumand Wahabuddin Ahmed	Social Work	Andhra Pradesh
1975	Bhishan Saroop Bansal	Civil Service	Uttarakhand
1975	Malati Barua	Social Work	Assam
1975	Ajit Chandra Chatterjee	Civil Service	West Bengal
1975	Rajagopala Chidambaram	Science & Engineering	Tamil Nadu
1975	Krishna Prasad Dar	Civil Service	Uttar Pradesh
1975	Pranab Rehatriranjan Dastidar	Science & Engineering	Maharashtra
1975	Reuben David	Medicine	Gujarat
1975	Jagdamba Devi	Arts	Bihar
1975	Jatindra Mohan Dutta	Literature & Education	West Bengal
1975	Lhingioneng Gangte	Social Work	Manipur
1975	Anil Kumar Ganguly	Science & Engineering	West Bengal
1975	M. S. Gopalakrishnan	Arts	Tamil Nadu
1975	Syed Hussain Ali Jaffri	Social Work	Delhi
1975	Pandit Jasraj	Arts	Maharashtra
1975	Stanley John	Medicine	Karnataka
1975	Amjad Ali Khan	Arts	Delhi
1975	Ivy Khan	Social Work	Delhi
1975	Gopi Krishna	Arts	Maharashtra
1975	Mathew M. Kuzhiveli	Literature & Education	Kerala
1975	Mary Poonen Lukose	Medicine	Kerala
1975	Pessie Madan	Civil Service	– (Note: Indicates a citizen of Myanmar)
1975	Gundu Bandopent Meemamsi	Civil Service	Uttar Pradesh
1975	Ali Mohammad	Medicine	Jammu & Kashmir
1975	Dhanpati Rai Nagpaul	Medicine	Uttar Pradesh
1975	Sanjukta Panigrahi	Arts	Odisha
1975	Basavaraj Rajguru	Arts	Karnataka
1975	Kalyanam Raghuramaiah	Arts	Andhra Pradesh
1975	Bachubhai Ravat	Literature & Education	Gujarat
1975	Pankaj Roy	Sports	West Bengal
1975	Pradip Ranjan Roy	Science & Engineering	West Bengal
1975	M. S. Sathyu	Arts	Maharashtra
1975	Sekharipuram Narayana Aiyar Seshadri	Science & Engineering	Tamil Nadu
1975	Mahadev Lalji Shahare	Literature & Education	Delhi
1975	Arjan Singh	Civil Service	Uttar Pradesh
1975	Shambhu Dayal Sinvhal	Science & Engineering	Uttarakhand
1975	Sudhakar Dwarka Nath Soman	Science & Engineering	Maharashtra
1975	K. G. Subramanyan	Arts	West Bengal
1975	Gitchandra Tongbra	Arts	Manipur
1975	N. S. Venkatesan	Civil Service	Chandigarh
1975	V. S. Wakankar	Civil Service	Madhya Pradesh
1975	K. J. Yesudas	Arts	Kerala
1976	L. Kijungluba AO	Social Work	Nagaland
1976	Saif-ud-din Ahmad	Medicine	Uttar Pradesh
1976	Roshan Lal Anand	Sports	Punjab
1976	Nand Kumar Avasthi	Social Work	Uttar Pradesh
1976	Brajendra Kishore Banerjee	Science & Engineering	West Bengal
1976	Syed Bashiruddin	Literature & Education	Uttar Pradesh
1976	Shyam Benegal	Arts	Maharashtra
1976	Kailash Chand	Civil Service	Punjab
1976	Satya Prosad Chatterjee	Civil Service	Delhi
1976	Ismat Chughtai	Literature & Education	Maharashtra
1976	Hari Kant Dang	Sports	Delhi
1976	Seth Sri Krishan Dass	Social Work	Haryana
1976	B. R. Deodhar	Science & Engineering	Maharashtra
1976	Durga Deulkar	Medicine	Maharashtra
1976	Satya Dev	Civil Service	Himachal Pradesh
1976	Ashapoorna Devi	Literature & Education	West Bengal
1976	Kalabati Devi	Social Work	Bihar
1976	M. K. Binodini Devi	Literature & Education	Manipur
1976	Ravindra Santram Dharkar	Medicine	Madhya Pradesh
1976	B. V. Doshi	Science & Engineering	Gujarat
1976	Army Dhunji Bhoy Engineer	Medicine	Uttar Pradesh
1976	Nimai Charan Harichandan	Arts	Odisha
1976	Atmaram Bhairav Joshi	Science & Engineering	Delhi
1976	Ustad Faiyyaz Ahmed Khan	Arts	Maharashtra
1976	Govinda Pillai Unnikrishna Menon	Civil Service	Tamil Nadu
1976	Begum Mumtaz Jehan Mirza	Literature & Education	Delhi
1976	Om Prakash Mittal	Civil Service	Delhi
1976	Raghunath Mohapatra	Arts	Odisha
1976	Ram Narain Nagu	Civil Service	Madhya Pradesh
1976	Bhikhubhai Khushalbhai Naik	Medicine	Andhra Pradesh
1976	Ram Narayan	Arts	Maharashtra
1976	Manickam Narayanan	Literature & Education	Tamil Nadu
1976	K. V. Narayanaswamy	Arts	Tamil Nadu
1976	Tekur Kashi Nath	Arts	Delhi
1976	Raghubhai Morarji Nayak	Literature & Education	–
1976	Krishna Pai Pai	Medicine	Kerala
1976	Bishambhar Nath Pande	Social Work	Uttar Pradesh
1976	Mukut Dhar Pandeya	Literature & Education	Chhattisgarh
1976	Krishna Chandra Panigrahi	Literature & Education	Odisha
1976	Thangam Philip	Civil Service	Maharashtra
1976	Swami Pranavananda	Social Work	Uttar Pradesh
1976	A. K. Ramanujan	Literature & Education	–
1976	R. Nagendra Rao	Arts	Karnataka
1976	Mulk Raj Saraf	Literature & Education	Jammu & Kashmir
1976	Gertrude Emerson Sen	Literature & Education	–
1976	Rakhaldas Sengupta	Civil Service	Delhi
1976	Muni Inder Dev Sharma	Medicine	Delhi
1976	Keshavram Kashiram Shastri	Literature & Education	Gujarat
1976	Gurbachan Singh Sindhu	Science & Engineering	Uttar Pradesh
1976	Ajit Singh	Civil Service	Delhi
1976	S. Somasundaram	Arts	Tamil Nadu
1976	Subashni	Social Work	Haryana
1976	Parveen Sultana	Arts	Maharashtra
1976	Mohd. Shafi Khan Bekal Utsahi	Literature & Education	Uttar Pradesh
1976	Jai Hormusjee Vakil	Social Work	Maharashtra
1977	Janaki Ammal	Science & Engineering	Kerala
1977	Ram Narain Bagley	Medicine	Uttar Pradesh
1977	Ramamoorthi Belagaje	Science & Engineering	–
1977	Dhanraj Bhagat	Arts	Delhi
1977	Sri Ram Bharatya	Social Work	Uttar Pradesh
1977	Ismail Ahmed Cachalia	Social Work	Gujarat
1977	Jugal Kishore Choudhury	Science & Engineering	Delhi
1977	Maitreyi Devi	Literature & Education	West Bengal
1977	Bhupen Hazarika	Arts	Assam
1977	Prafulla Kumar Jena	Science & Engineering	Odisha
1977	Vishwa Gopal Jhingran	Science & Engineering	Uttarakhand
1977	Sita Ram Lalas	Literature & Education	Rajasthan
1977	Telo Mascarenhas	Public Affairs	– (Note: Indicates a citizen of Germany)
1977	Indira Miri	Literature & Education	Assam
1977	Sheik Chinna Moulana	Arts	Tamil Nadu
1977	Pritish Nandy	Literature & Education	West Bengal
1977	Rangaswamy Narasimhan	Civil Service	Maharashtra
1977	Mohammed Fayazuddin Nizami	Science & Engineering	Andhra Pradesh
1977	Lucy Oommen	Medicine	Delhi
1977	Paul Pothen	Civil Service	Delhi
1977	Dhani Prem	Social Work	–
1977	Sheikh Mohd. Rafique	Social Work	Uttar Pradesh
1977	Bhupathiraju Vissam Raju	Civil Service	Delhi
1977	Alla Rakha	Arts	Jammu & Kashmir
1977	C. Narayana Reddy	Literature & Education	Andhra Pradesh
1977	Jehangir Sabavala	Arts	Maharashtra
1977	Ghulam Rasool Santosh	Arts	Delhi
1977	T. S. Satyan	Literature & Education	Delhi
1977	Devendra Satyarthi	Literature & Education	Delhi
1977	Madhuri R. Shah	Literature & Education	Maharashtra
1977	Meena Shah	Sports	Uttar Pradesh
1977	Goel Kaikobad Sorabji Shavaksha	Social Work	Maharashtra
1977	Evelyn Norah Shullai	Literature & Education	Meghalaya
1977	Rana Moti Singh	Science & Engineering	Punjab
1977	Sibte Hasan Zaidi	Science & Engineering	Uttar Pradesh

== Explanatory notes ==
Non-citizen recipients
