= List of Padma Shri award recipients in civil service =

Recipients of a civilian award in India

This is a list of recipients of the Padma Shri award, the fourth-highest civilian award of the Republic of India, in the field of Civil Service. As of 2025, a total of 231 individuals have been awarded Padma Shri for their contributions to civil service.

== 1950–1959 ==
Year	Name	State	Field
1954	Lt. Gen. Kodandreya Subayya Thimayya	Karnataka	Civil Service
1954	Mahadeva Iyer Ganapati	Odisha	Civil Service
1954	Pendyala Satianarayana Rau	Telangana	Civil Service
1954	Raghunath Rai Handa	Punjab	Civil Service
1954	Radha Krishna Gupta	Delhi	Civil Service
1954	Sukumar Sen	West Bengal	Civil Service
1954	Vyakarana Narahari Rao	Karnataka	Civil Service
1954	Major Gen Shankarro Pandurang Patil Thorat	Maharashtra	Civil Service
1954	Apa Saheb Bala Saheb Pant	Maharashtra	Civil Service
1954	Surinder Kumar Dey	West Bengal	Civil Service
1954	Tarlok Singh	Punjab	Civil Service
1954	Bhag Mehta	Gujarat	Civil Service
1955	Mokshagundam Visvesvaraya	Karnataka	Civil Service
1955	Venkata Acharya Shri Attur Rangaswami	Tamil Nadu	Civil Service
1955	Badhwar Shri Fateh Chand	Punjab	Civil Service
1955	Khungar Shri Sunder Das	Punjab	Civil Service
1955	Dey Shri Surinder Kumar	Delhi	Civil Service
1955	Joglekar Shri Digambar Vasudev	Maharashtra	Civil Service
1955	Mirza Shri Humayun	Karnataka	Civil Service
1955	Kewal Singh Choudhary Shri	Punjab	Civil Service
1955	Maneckji Shri Maneck Jehangir Bhickaji	Maharashtra	Civil Service
1956	Kanwar Sain	Rajasthan	Civil Service
1956	Malur Srinivasa Thirumale Iyengar	Tamil Nadu	Civil Service
1957	Kishakke Covilagam Kutti Ettan Raja	Kerala	Civil Service
1957	Maj. Gen. Gurbaksh Singh	Tamil Nadu	Civil Service
1957	Atmaram Ramchand Chellani	Telangana	Civil Service
1957	Jashwantrai Jayantilal Anjaria	Maharashtra	Civil Service
1957	Narayana swami Dharmrajan	Tamil Nadu	Civil Service
1957	Samarendranath Sen	West Bengal	Civil Service
1958	Arathil Candeth Narayanan Nambiar	Kerala	Civil Service
1958	Kumar Padma Sivasankara Menon	Kerala	Civil Service
1958	Brig. Ram Singh	Punjab	Civil Service
1959	Ali Yavar Jung	Maharashtra	Civil Service
1959	Balwant Singh Nag	Punjab	Civil Service
1959	Mathew Kandathil Mathulla	Karnataka	Civil Service
1959	Onkar Srinivasa Murthy	Tamil Nadu	Civil Service
1959	Parameshwari Kuttappa Panikkar	Kerala	Civil Service

== 1960-1969 ==
Year	Name	State	Field
1960	Vaidyanatha Subrahmanyan	Karnataka	Civil Service
1960	Harkrishan Lal Sethi	Delhi	Civil Service
1960	Captain Harmandar Singh	Punjab	Civil Service
1960	Nuthakki Bhanu Prasad	Telangana	Civil Service
1961	Bhagwan Sahay	Uttar Pradesh	Civil Service
1961	Niranjan Das Gulhati	Delhi	Civil Service
1961	Agaram Krishnamachar	Karnataka	Civil Service
1961	Bhagwat Sinha Mehta	Rajasthan	Civil Service
1961	Soman Narboo	Jammu and Kashmir	Civil Service
1962	Haravu venkatanarasingha Varada Raja Iengar	Tamil Nadu	Civil Service
1962	Vijaya Lakshmi Pandit	Uttar Pradesh	Civil Service
1962	Daulat Singh Kothari	Delhi	Civil Service
1962	Tarlok Singh	Punjab	Civil Service
1962	Bishnupada Mukerji	West Bengal	Civil Service
1962	Maj. Gen. Sarda Nand Singh	Punjab	Civil Service
1962	Amalananda Ghosh	West Bengal	Civil Service
1962	Challagalla Narasimham	Andhra Pradesh	Civil Service
1962	Joseph Durai Raj	Delhi	Civil Service
1962	Santu Jouharmal Shahaney	West Bengal	Civil Service
1962	Shanti Kumar Tribhuvandas Raja	Odisha	Civil Service
1962	Vyankatesh Ramchandra Vajramushti	Andhra Pradesh	Civil Service
1962	Vellore Ponnurangam Appadurai	Tamil Nadu	Civil Service
1963	Kanuri Lakshmana Rao	Delhi	Civil Service
1963	Maj. Gen. Sardar Harnarain Singh	Punjab	Civil Service
1963	K. C. Johorey	Haryana	Civil Service
1963	N. G.K. Murti	Tamil Nadu	Civil Service
1963	Noshir Framroze Suntook	Maharashtra	Civil Service
1963	Purnendu Kumar Banerjee	West Bengal	Civil Service
1963	Rana Krishnadev Narain Singh	Assam	Civil Service
1963	S. S. Yadav	Delhi	Civil Service
1963	Sisir Kumar Lahiri	United Kingdom	Civil Service
1963	Sumat Kishore Jain	Uttar Pradesh	Civil Service
1964	Anil Bandhu Guha	West Bengal	Civil Service
1964	Bhola Nath Mullik	Delhi	Civil Service
1964	Lt. Col Rameshchandra Bhaskar Sule	Maharashtra	Civil Service
1964	Thepfoorya Haralu	Andhra Pradesh	Civil Service
1965	Air Marshal Arjan Singh	Delhi	Civil Service
1965	Gen. Jayanto Nath Chaudhuri	West Bengal	Civil Service
1965	Air Vice Mar. Ramaswamy Rajaram	Tamil Nadu	Civil Service
1965	Air Vice Marshal P.Chandra Lal	Punjab	Civil Service
1965	Lt. (Gen.) Harbakhsh Singh	Delhi	Civil Service
1965	Lt. General Ppatrick Oswald Dunn	Maharashtra	Civil Service
1965	Lt. General Joginder Singh Dhillon	Punjab	Civil Service
1965	Lt. General Kashmir Singh Katoch	Punjab	Civil Service
1965	Santu Jouharmal Shahaney	West Bengal	Civil Service
1966	Bhabani Charan Mukharji	West Bengal	Civil Service
1966	Homi Nusserwanji Sethna	Maharashtra	Civil Service
1966	Sardar Mohan Singh	Delhi	Civil Service
1966	Jagdish Prasad	Uttar Pradesh	Civil Service
1966	Kuldip Singh Virk	Punjab	Civil Service
1966	Kundan Lal Bery	Punjab	Civil Service
1966	Sanganbasappa Mallangouda Patil	Karnataka	Civil Service
1966	Stanislaus Joseph Coelho	Maharashtra	Civil Service
1966	Surinder Singh Bedi	Delhi	Civil Service
1967	Bhola Nath Jha	Uttar Pradesh	Civil Service
1967	Hafiz Mohammad Ibrahim	Andhra Pradesh	Civil Service
1967	Pattadakal Venkanna Raghavendra Rao	Telangana	Civil Service
1967	Dharamnath Prasad Kohli	Punjab	Civil Service
1967	Mulk Raj Chopra	Uttarakhand	Civil Service
1967	Balbir Singh Saigal	Delhi	Civil Service
1967	Frank Sathyarajan Dewars	Burma	Civil Service
1967	Kiron Chandra Banerjee	West Bengal	Civil Service
1967	Shanti Prasad	Uttar Pradesh	Civil Service
1968	Kirpal Singh	Delhi	Civil Service
1968	Lt. Gen. Sam Hormusji Framji Jamshedji Manekshaw	Maharashtra	Civil Service
1968	Sarda Prasad Varma	Uttar Pradesh	Civil Service
1968	Calambur Sivaramamurti	Delhi	Civil Service
1968	Jehangir Shapurji Bhownagary	France	Civil Service
1968	Krishna Swarup Mullick	Delhi	Civil Service
1968	Mantosh Sondhi	Haryana	Civil Service
1969	Mohan Sinha Mehta	Rajasthan	Civil Service
1969	Dattatraya Shridhar Joshi	Maharashtra	Civil Service
1969	Ghananand Pande	Uttar Pradesh	Civil Service
1969	Rajeshwar Dayal	Delhi	Civil Service
1969	Dhyan Pal Singh	Uttarakhand	Civil Service
1969	Kumar Nandan Prasad	Uttar Pradesh	Civil Service
1969	Shri Chand Chhabra	Delhi	Civil Service
1969	Subodh Chandra Dev	Assam	Civil Service
1969	Sudhir Krishna Mukherji	Delhi	Civil Service

== 1970–1979 ==
Year	Name	State	Field
1970	Binay Ranjan Sen	West Bengal	Civil Service
1970	Gen. Paramasiva Prabhakar Kumaramangalam	Tamil Nadu	Civil Service
1970	Grp.Capt. Suranjan Das	West Bengal	Civil Service
1970	Lt. Gen. Harbakhsh Singh	Punjab	Civil Service
1970	Arcot Ramaswami Mudaliar	Andhra Pradesh	Civil Service
1970	Prem Nath Wahi	Delhi	Civil Service
1970	Gainedi Appala Narasimha Rao	Andhra Pradesh	Civil Service
1970	Mulukutla Rama Brahmam	Andhra Pradesh	Civil Service
1970	Nitya M. Wagle	Maharashtra	Civil Service
1970	Sunil Kumar Bhattacharya	West Bengal	Civil Service
1970	Gurdas Mal	Delhi	Civil Service
1970	Laxman Swarup Darbari	Delhi	Civil Service
1970	Narain Singh	Rajasthan	Civil Service
1971	Balram Sivaraman	Tamil Nadu	Civil Service
1971	Sumati Morarjee	Maharashtra	Civil Service
1971	Kasturi Lal Vij	Delhi	Civil Service
1971	Monindra Nath Chakravarti	West Bengal	Civil Service
1971	Parmeshwari Lal Verma	Chandigarh	Civil Service
1971	Sadashiv Misra	Odisha	Civil Service
1971	Kum. Subhashni Jhunnu Dasgupta	Delhi	Civil Service
1971	Amiya Bhusan Das Gupta	Delhi	Civil Service
1971	Krishna Swarup Pathak	Punjab	Civil Service
1971	Jagmohan	Delhi	Civil Service
1971	Palanindy Kandaswamy	Tamil Nadu	Civil Service
1971	Sachchidanand Keshav Nargundkar	Bihar	Civil Service
1971	Subrahmanyam Paramanandhan	Delhi	Civil Service
1971	Sudhansu Kumar Chakravarty	Bihar	Civil Service
1972	Admiral Sardarilal Mathradas Nanda	Delhi	Civil Service
1972	Air Chief Marshal Pratap Chandra Lal	Punjab	Civil Service
1972	Gen. Sam Hormusji Framji Jamshedji Manekshaw	Tamil Nadu	Civil Service
1972	Air Mar. Hari Chand Dewan	Punjab	Civil Service
1972	Air Mar. Minoo Merwah Engineer	Gujarat	Civil Service
1972	Jai Krishna	Uttar Pradesh	Civil Service
1972	Lt. Gen Jagjit Singh Aurora	Delhi	Civil Service
1972	Lt. Gen Kunhiraman Palat Candeth	Delhi	Civil Service
1972	Lt. Gen. Khem Karan Singh	Punjab	Civil Service
1972	Lt. Gen. Sagat Singh	Punjab	Civil Service
1972	Lt. Gen. Sartaj Singh	Punjab	Civil Service
1972	Lt.Gen. Gopal Gurunath Bewoor	Karnataka	Civil Service
1972	Lt.Gen. Tapishwar Narain Raina	Jammu and Kashmir	Civil Service
1972	Major Genl. Inderjit Singh Gill	Maharashtra	Civil Service
1972	Amrut Vithaldas Mody	Maharashtra	Civil Service
1972	Ashwini Kumar	Punjab	Civil Service
1972	Benoy Bhushan Ghosh (Posthumous)	West Bengal	Civil Service
1972	Chandrika Prasad Srivastava	United Kingdom	Civil Service
1972	Khusro Framurz Rustamji	Madhya Pradesh	Civil Service
1972	Mohd. Hayath	Karnataka	Civil Service
1972	Nori Gopala Krishna Murti	Delhi	Civil Service
1972	Pran Nath Luthra	Punjab	Civil Service
1972	S. S. Sahi	Chandigarh	Civil Service
1972	Surinder Singh Bedi	Delhi	Civil Service
1972	Tonse Ananth Pai	Karnataka	Civil Service
1972	Vice Adm. Nilkanta Krishnan	Tamil Nadu	Civil Service
1972	Vice Adm. Sourendra Nath Kohli	Punjab	Civil Service
1972	Brig. Harish Chandra	Delhi	Civil Service
1972	Dr.(Miss) Leela Vinayak Phatak	Delhi	Civil Service
1972	Bhuwan Chand Pande	Uttar Pradesh	Civil Service
1972	Brijbir Saran Das	Delhi	Civil Service
1972	Chandra Shekar Samal	West Bengal	Civil Service
1972	Debdulal Bandopadhyay	West Bengal	Civil Service
1972	Hari Prasad Jaiswal	Karnataka	Civil Service
1972	Himangshu Mohan Choudhury	Uttar Pradesh	Civil Service
1972	Homi Cawas Sethna	Maharashtra	Civil Service
1972	Ishwar Chander Gupta	Chandigarh	Civil Service
1972	Jagdish Lal	Punjab	Civil Service
1972	Kailas Chandra Sengupta	West Bengal	Civil Service
1972	Kamal Kanti Naskar	West Bengal	Civil Service
1972	Karachur Lingappa Nanjappa	Delhi	Civil Service
1972	Moreshwar Mangesh Wagle	Maharashtra	Civil Service
1972	Om Prakash Bahl	Punjab	Civil Service
1972	Pallessena Ramanathan Rajgopal	Tamil Nadu	Civil Service
1972	Pradip Kumar Banerjee	West Bengal	Civil Service
1972	Rajinder Singh	Punjab	Civil Service
1972	Ramamurthi Badrinath	Delhi	Civil Service
1972	Sheikh Gulab	Madhya Pradesh	Civil Service
1972	Sukhbir Singh	Chandigarh	Civil Service
1972	Surjit Singh Gujral	Delhi	Civil Service
1972	Swarn Singh Boparai	Punjab	Civil Service
1972	Vijay Singh	Rajasthan	Civil Service
1973	Thirumalraya Swaminathan	Tamil Nadu	Civil Service
1973	Basanti Devi	West Bengal	Civil Service
1973	Pitambar Pant	Uttar Pradesh	Civil Service
1973	Ramakant Maheshwar Muzumdar	Karnataka	Civil Service
1973	Sudhir Krishna Mukherjee	West Bengal	Civil Service
1973	Brig. Bhagwan Javharmal Shahaney	Maharashtra	Civil Service
1973	Maddali Gopala Krishna	Uttarakhand	Civil Service
1973	Shridhar Upadhyay	Uttarakhand	Civil Service
1973	Triloki Nath Sharma	Uttar Pradesh	Civil Service
1973	Rasipuram Venkatanarayana Ramaswamy (Posthumous)	Tamil Nadu	Civil Service
1973	Lt. Col. Koka Simhadri Babu	Delhi	Civil Service
1973	Balasubramanyan Ramadorai	Delhi	Civil Service
1973	Chinnaswamy Rajan Subramanian	Karnataka	Civil Service
1973	Dalip Kumar Sengupta	West Bengal	Civil Service
1973	Debi Prasad Mukherji	West Bengal	Civil Service
1973	Fateh Chand Gera	Delhi	Civil Service
1973	Harishchandra Kasinath Garve	Karnataka	Civil Service
1973	Jayanta Kumar Bagchi	West Bengal	Civil Service
1973	Kamal Krishna Sinha	Bihar	Civil Service
1973	Padinjaraimadam Narayanan Nair Bhaskaran Nair	Delhi	Civil Service
1973	Panimangalore Appraya Bhat	Maharashtra	Civil Service
1973	Prabhakar Bhikaji Chitnis	Maharashtra	Civil Service
1973	Raghunath Singh Gahlowt	Delhi	Civil Service
1973	Shumsher Singh	Maharashtra	Civil Service
1973	Venkataraman Krishnamurthy	Tamil Nadu	Civil Service
1973	Vithal Ramkrishna Vengurlekar	Maharashtra	Civil Service
1973	Yamunabai Vinayakrao Khadilkar	Maharashtra	Civil Service
1973	Wing Cdr Keshavamurthy Ramchndra Rao	Gujarat	Civil Service
1974	Vijayendra Kasturi Ranga Varadaraja Rao	Karnataka	Civil Service
1974	Harish Chandra Sarin	Delhi	Civil Service
1974	Hasmukh Dhirajlal Sankalia	Maharashtra	Civil Service
1974	Moti Chandra	Maharashtra	Civil Service
1974	Hari Narain	Telangana	Civil Service
1974	Syed Zahoor Qasim	Delhi	Civil Service
1974	Dinesh Mohan	Uttarakhand	Civil Service
1974	Baldev Raj Chopra	Afghanistan	Civil Service
1974	Gopal Chandra Dutt	Delhi	Civil Service
1974	Himansu Kumar Banerjee	West Bengal	Civil Service
1974	Indra Kumar Gupta	Delhi	Civil Service
1974	Kalluri Gopal Rao	Karnataka	Civil Service
1974	Kooram Chakravarthy Kannan	Andhra Pradesh	Civil Service
1974	Pushkar Nath Bhan	Jammu and Kashmir	Civil Service
1974	Raj Kumar Khanna	Delhi	Civil Service
1974	Som Nath Sadhu	Jammu and Kashmir	Civil Service
1974	Subramanya Iyer Balakrishnan	Delhi	Civil Service
1974	Vindhyavasini Devi	Bihar	Civil Service
1975	Homi Nusserwanji Sethna	Maharashtra	Civil Service
1975	Pancheti Koteswaram	Tamil Nadu	Civil Service
1975	Ronald Carltonvivian Piadade Noronha	Madhya Pradesh	Civil Service
1975	Raj Kumar Khanna	Delhi	Civil Service
1975	Brig. Pessie Madan	Burma	Civil Service
1975	Ajit Chandra Chatterjee	West Bengal	Civil Service
1975	Bishan Saroop Bansal	Uttarakhand	Civil Service
1975	Gundu Bandopant Meemamsi	Uttar Pradesh	Civil Service
1975	Krishna Prasad Dar	Uttar Pradesh	Civil Service
1975	Negapatnam Sambasiva Venkatesan	Chandigarh	Civil Service
1975	Suraj Mal Agrawal	Delhi	Civil Service
1975	Vishnu Shridhar Wakankar	Madhya Pradesh	Civil Service
1976	Calambur Sivaramamurti	Delhi	Civil Service
1976	Malcolm Sathya Nathan Adiseshiah	Tamil Nadu	Civil Service
1976	Devendra Sen	West Bengal	Civil Service
1976	Shri Ram Mehta	Delhi	Civil Service
1976	Brig. Ajit Singh	Delhi	Civil Service
1976	Kum. Thangam E. Philip	Maharashtra	Civil Service
1976	Govinda Pillai Unnikrishna Menon	Tamil Nadu	Civil Service
1976	Kailash Chand	Punjab	Civil Service
1976	Om Parkash Mittal	Delhi	Civil Service
1976	Rakhaldas Sengupta	Delhi	Civil Service
1976	Ramnarain Nagu	Madhya Pradesh	Civil Service
1976	Satya Dev	Himachal Pradesh	Civil Service
1976	Satya Prosad Chatterjea	Delhi	Civil Service
1976	Tekur Kasi Nath	Delhi	Civil Service
1977	Air Chief Marshal Om Prakash Mehra	Punjab	Civil Service
1977	Jagmohan	Delhi	Civil Service
1977	Rangaswamy Narasimhan	Maharashtra	Civil Service
1977	Bhupathiraju Vissam Raju	Delhi	Civil Service
1977	Paul Pothen	Delhi	Civil Service

== 1980–1989 ==
Year	Name	State	Field
1981	Prabhat Kumar Mukherjee	West Bengal	Civil Service
1981	Avul Pakir Jinalabdeen Abdul Kalam	Delhi	Civil Service
1981	Capt. Fakir Mohamed Jainuddin Juvale	Maharashtra	Civil Service
1982	Syed Zahoor Qasim	Delhi	Civil Service
1982	Ekkadu Srinivasan Parthasarathy	Tamil Nadu	Civil Service
1982	Palligarnai Thirumalai Venugopal	United States of America	Civil Service
1982	Prem Chandra Luthar	Delhi	Civil Service
1982	Vice Adm. Nar Pati Datta	Maharashtra	Civil Service
1983	Lt. Gen. Adi Meherji Sethna	Delhi	Civil Service
1983	Lt. Gen. Suraj Parkash Malhotra	Delhi	Civil Service
1983	K. Sankaran Nair	Kerala	Civil Service
1983	Kershasp Tehmurasp Satarawala	Goa	Civil Service
1983	Umrao Singh	Punjab	Civil Service
1983	Air Vice Marshal Harkrishan Lal Kapur	Delhi	Civil Service
1983	Br. K.V. Peter S.J	Tamil Nadu	Civil Service
1983	Narla Tata Rao	Telangana	Civil Service
1983	Anselm Sawihlira	Mizoram	Civil Service
1983	Chhattra Pati Joshi	Delhi	Civil Service
1983	Jivanlal Motilal Thakore	Gujarat	Civil Service
1983	Kanwaljit Singh Bains	Uttar Pradesh	Civil Service
1983	Raghu Raj	Uttar Pradesh	Civil Service
1984	Kanwar Natwar Singh	Delhi	Civil Service
1984	Jai Singh Pal Yadav	Delhi	Civil Service
1984	Satya Pal Jagota	Canada	Civil Service
1984	Krishna Murari Tiwari	Uttarakhand	Civil Service
1984	Mohammed Hamid Ansari	Delhi	Civil Service
1985	Mambillikalathil Govind Kumar Menon	Kerala	Civil Service
1985	Amarjit Singh	Rajasthan	Civil Service
1985	Srinivasan Varadarajan	Delhi	Civil Service
1985	Gurbakhsh Singh	Delhi	Civil Service
1985	Surrindar Singh Gill	Delhi	Civil Service
1985	Erasmus Lyngdoh	Meghalaya	Civil Service
1985	Satish Chandra Kala	Uttar Pradesh	Civil Service
1985	Maj. Gen. Som Nath Bhaskar	Karnataka	Civil Service
1985	Chandra Mohan	Chandigarh	Civil Service
1985	Harbans Singh Jolly	Delhi	Civil Service
1985	Jai Rattan Bhalla	Delhi	Civil Service
1985	Jasdev Singh	Delhi	Civil Service
1985	Krishan Dev Bali	Delhi	Civil Service
1985	Namagundlu Venkata Krishnamurthy	Maharashtra	Civil Service
1985	S.V.S. Raghavan	Delhi	Civil Service
1986	Vallampadugai Srinivasa Raghavan Arunachalam	Delhi	Civil Service
1986	Lt.Gen.(Rt.) Dr. Manohar Lal Chibber	Delhi	Civil Service
1986	Gulshan Lal Tandon	West Bengal	Civil Service
1986	Rajeev Sethi	Delhi	Civil Service
1986	Ram Krishna Trivedi	Uttar Pradesh	Civil Service
1986	Venkataraman Krishnamurthy	Delhi	Civil Service
1986	Somasundaram Subramanian	Delhi	Civil Service
1986	Hon. Commodore Gokaldas Shivaldas Ahuja	Maharashtra	Civil Service
1986	Anil Kumar Lakhina	Maharashtra	Civil Service
1986	Ramesh Inder Singh	Delhi	Civil Service
1987	Manmohan Singh	Delhi	Civil Service
1987	Late. (Gen.) Arun Shridhar Vaidya	Maharashtra	Civil Service
1987	Laxmi Prasad Sihare	Delhi	Civil Service
1987	Julio Francis Ribeiro	Punjab	Civil Service
1987	Mohammad Yunus	Delhi	Civil Service
1987	Ramachandra Dattatraya Pradhan	Maharashtra	Civil Service
1987	Srinivasa Anandaram	Delhi	Civil Service
1987	Gurbachan Jagat	Punjab	Civil Service
1987	Joginder Paul Birdi	Punjab	Civil Service
1987	Mohd. Izhar Alam	Punjab	Civil Service
1988	Abid Hussain	Delhi	Civil Service
1988	Avinder Singh Brar (Posthumous)	Punjab	Civil Service
1988	Chaman Lal	Punjab	Civil Service
1988	Sarbdeep Singh Virk	Punjab	Civil Service
1989	Anna Rajam Malhotra	Maharashtra	Civil Service
1989	Kanwar Pal Singh Gill	Chandigarh	Civil Service
1989	Nima Namgyal Lama	West Bengal	Civil Service
1989	Sarabjit Singh	Punjab	Civil Service
1989	Ved Prakash Marwah	Delhi	Civil Service

== 1990–1999 ==
Year	Name	State	Field
1990	Achyut Madhav Gokhale	Delhi	Civil Service
1990	Chavaly Srinivasa Sastry	Delhi	Civil Service
1991	Khusro Faramurz Rustamji	Maharashtra	Civil Service
1991	Ashok Kumar Patel	Jammu and Kashmir	Civil Service
1991	Mehmood-ur Rahman	Jammu and Kashmir	Civil Service
1991	Prakash Singh	Punjab	Civil Service
1991	Ram Ganpati	Delhi	Civil Service
1992	Virendra Dayal	Delhi	Civil Service
1992	Dr.(Smt.) Inderjit Kaur Barthakur	Delhi	Civil Service
1992	Jitendra Narain Saksena	Delhi	Civil Service
1992	Mayankote Kelath Narayanan	Delhi	Civil Service
1992	Oudh Narayan Shrivastava	Delhi	Civil Service
1998	Chewang Phunsog	Jammu and Kashmir	Civil Service
1998	Suryadevara Ramachandra Rao	Gujarat	Civil Service
1999	Dharma Vira	Delhi	Civil Service
1999	Lallan Prasad Singh (Posthumous)	Delhi	Civil Service

== 2000–2009 ==
Year	Name	State	Field
2000	Krishen Behari Lall	Delhi	Civil Service
2000	Manohar Singh Gill	Delhi	Civil Service
2000	Bhairab Datt Pande	Uttarakhand	Civil Service
2000	Tarlok Singh	Delhi	Civil Service
2001	Chakravarthi Vijayaraghava Narasimhan	Tamil Nadu	Civil Service
2001	Lt.Gen.(Rtd.) Mohammad Ahmad Zaki	Telangana	Civil Service
2001	Elattuvalapil Sreedharan	Delhi	Civil Service
2002	Jagat Singh Mehta	Rajasthan	Civil Service
2002	Maharajakrishna Rasgotra	Delhi	Civil Service
2004	Thiruvengadam Lakshman Sankar	Telangana	Civil Service
2004	Thoppil Varghese Antony	Tamil Nadu	Civil Service
2005	Jyotindra Nath Dixit (Posthumous)	Delhi	Civil Service
2005	Girish Chandra Saxena	Delhi	Civil Service
2005	Gopichettipalayam Venkataramana Iyer Ramakrishna	Tamil Nadu	Civil Service
2005	Tumkur Ramaiya Satish Chandran	Karnataka	Civil Service
2006	Colathur Rama Krishnaswamy Rao Sahib	Tamil Nadu	Civil Service
2006	Puthenveetil Sankar Nair Appu	Karnataka	Civil Service
2006	Jatindra Nath Chaudhry	Delhi	Civil Service
2007	V. Krishnamurthy	Delhi	Civil Service
2007	Naresh Chandra	Delhi	Civil Service
2007	Narinder Nath Vohra	Haryana	Civil Service
2008	Chandrashekhar Dasgupta	Delhi	Civil Service
2008	Kantipudi Padmanabhaiah	Delhi	Civil Service
2008	V. Ramachandran	Kerala	Civil Service
2009	Chandrika Prasad Srivastava	Maharashtra	Civil Service
2009	Shashi Kant Misra	Haryana	Civil Service
2009	Syamal Bhushan Ghosh Dastidar	Haryana	Civil Service

== 2010–2019 ==
Year	Name	State	Field
2010	Padmakar Ramchandra Dubhashi	Maharashtra	Civil Service
2010	Bal Krishna Chaturvedi	Delhi	Civil Service
2010	Moosa Raza	Delhi	Civil Service
2010	D.R. Kaarthikeyan	Delhi	Civil Service
2011	Brajesh Chandra Mishra	Delhi	Civil Service
2011	Mahesh Nilkanth Buch	Madhya Pradesh	Civil Service
2011	Shyam Saran	Delhi	Civil Service
2011	Surendra Singh	Delhi	Civil Service
2011	Narayan Singh Bhati Zipashni	Telangana	Civil Service
2011	P. K. Sen	Bihar	Civil Service
2012	T. V. Rajeswar	Delhi	Civil Service
2012	Mata Prasad	Uttar Pradesh	Civil Service
2012	Nagarajan Vittal	Tamil Nadu	Civil Service
2012	Ronen Sen	Delhi	Civil Service
2013	Maharaj Kishan Bhan	Delhi	Civil Service
2013	Hemendra Singh Panwar	Haryana	Civil Service
2014	Vijayendra Nath Kaul	Delhi	Civil Service
2014	Parveen Talha	Uttar Pradesh	Civil Service
2015	Needamangalam Gopalaswami	Tamil Nadu	Civil Service
2015	P.V. Rajaraman	Tamil Nadu	Civil Service
2015	Rangarajan Vasudevan Posthumous)	Delhi	Civil Service
2016	Vinod Rai	Delhi	Civil Service
2017	T K Viswanathan	Haryana	Civil Service
2017	Kanwal Sibal	Delhi	Civil Service
2017	Tripuraneni Hanuman Chowdary	Telangana	Civil Service
2018	Satyanarayansingh Shivsinghji Rathore	Gujarat	Civil Service
2019	Vijay Krishan Shunglu	Delhi	Civil Service
2019	Subrahmanyam Jaishankar	Delhi	Civil Service

== 2020–2026 ==
Year	Name	State	Field
2021	Nripendra Misra	Uttar Pradesh	Civil Service
2022	General Bipin Rawat PVSM, UYSM, AVSM, YSM, SM, VSM (Posthumous)	Uttarakhand	Civil Service
2022	Rajiv Mehrishi	Rajasthan	Civil Service
2022	Guruprasad Mohapatra (Posthumous)	Delhi	Civil Service
2025	Kishore Kunal (Posthumous)	Bihar	Civil Service
2026	R. V. S. Mani	Delhi	Civil Service
