= Chordia =

Chordia is a surname. Notable people with the surname include:

- Dharamchand Chordia (1949/1950–2021), Indian politician
- Mohanmullji Chordia (1902–1984), Indian social worker, educationist, businessman, and philanthropist
- Vimal Kumar Chordia (1924–c. 2019), Indian politician
