= Bajoria =

Bajoria is an Indian surname. Notable people with the surname include:

- Badri Prasad Bajoria (1925–1976), Indian social worker
- Gopikishan Bajoria, Indian politician
- Shishir Bajoria (born 1956/57), Indian politician and industrialist
