= Ishrat =

Ishrat is a given name. Notable people with the name include:

== Given name ==
- Ishrat Afreen (born 1956), Urdu poet
- Ishrat Jahan Chaity, Bangladeshi film actress
- Ishrat Fatima, former Pakistani newsreader and radio presenter
- Ishrat Hashmi (1948–2005), Pakistani actress
- Ishrat Hussain (born 1941), Pakistani banker and economist
- Ishrat Jahan, practising advocate and former Indian National Congress municipal councillor in Delhi
- Ishrat Masroor Quddusi, retired Odisha High Court Judge
- Ishrat Ali Siddiqui (1919–2014), Indian poet, former editor of the Urdu daily, Quami Awaz
- Ishrat Hussain Usmani (1917–1992), Pakistani atomic physicist, chaired the Pakistan Atomic Energy Commission
- Begum Ishrat Ashraf, Pakistani politician, member of the National Assembly of Pakistan
- Syed Ishrat Abbas (1928–1980), stage name Darpan, Pakistani film actor

== See also ==
- Ishrat Jahan case, ongoing case where officers of the Ahmedabad Police Crime Branch and members of the Subsidiary Intelligence Bureau (SIB) of Ahmedabad are accused of shooting dead four people on 15 June 2004
