= Vazifdar =

Vazifdar is a surname. Notable people with the surname include:

- Jamshed Vazifdar, Parsi physician
- Shiavax Jal Vazifdar (born 1956), Indian lawyer
