= Assassination of Indira Gandhi =

1984 assassination of Indian prime minister

- Part of the Insurgency in Punjab, India
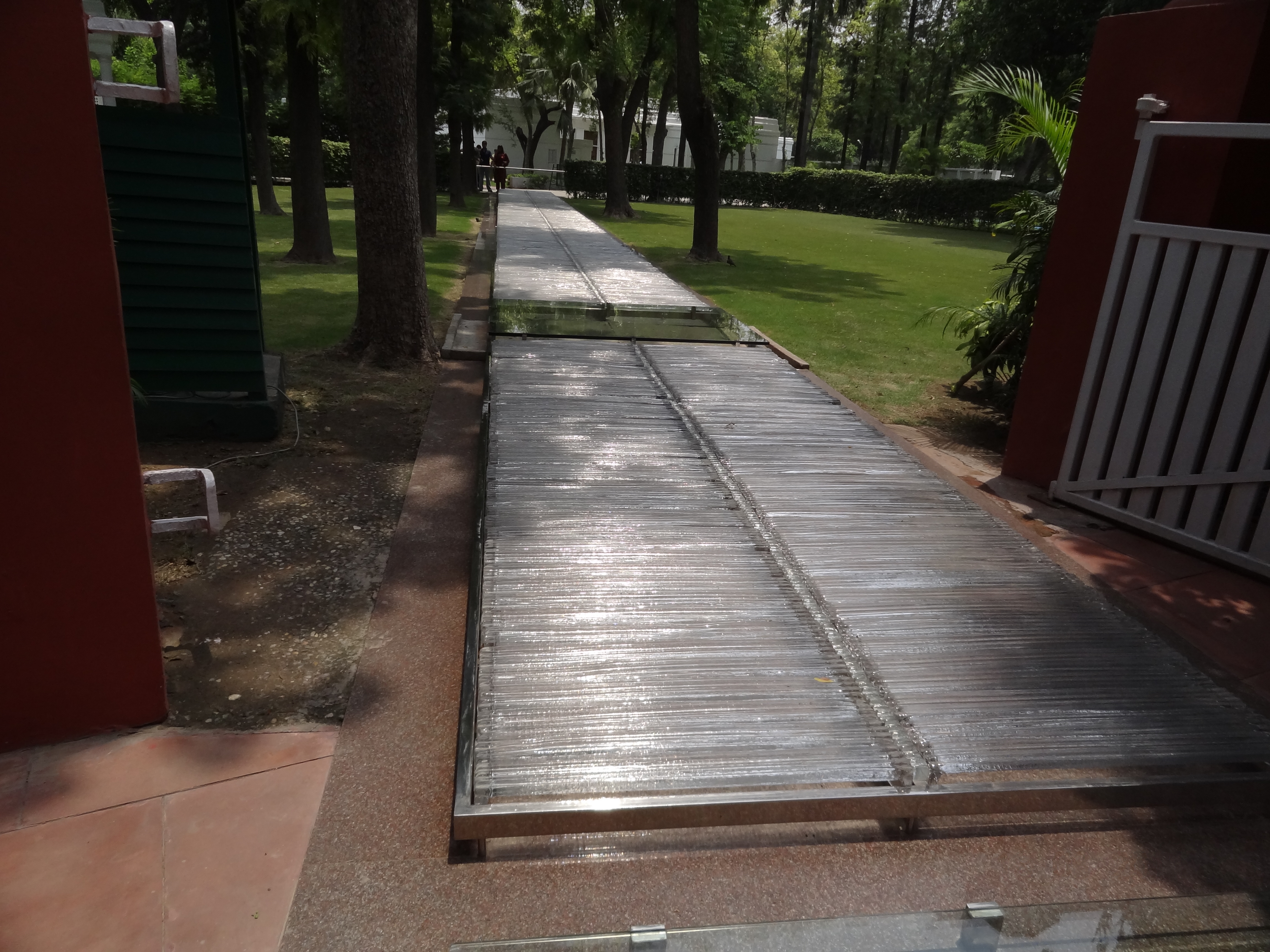
- The spot where Indira Gandhi was shot down is marked by a glass opening in the crystal pathway at the Indira Gandhi Memorial
- Location: 28.6002°N 77.2061°E; Prime Minister residence, Safdarjung Road, New Delhi
- Date: 31 October 1984; 9:30 a.m.
- Attack type: Assassination by firearm
- Weapons: .38 (9.1 mm) revolver and Sterling submachine gun
- Victim: Indira Gandhi
- Assailants: Satwant Singh and Beant Singh

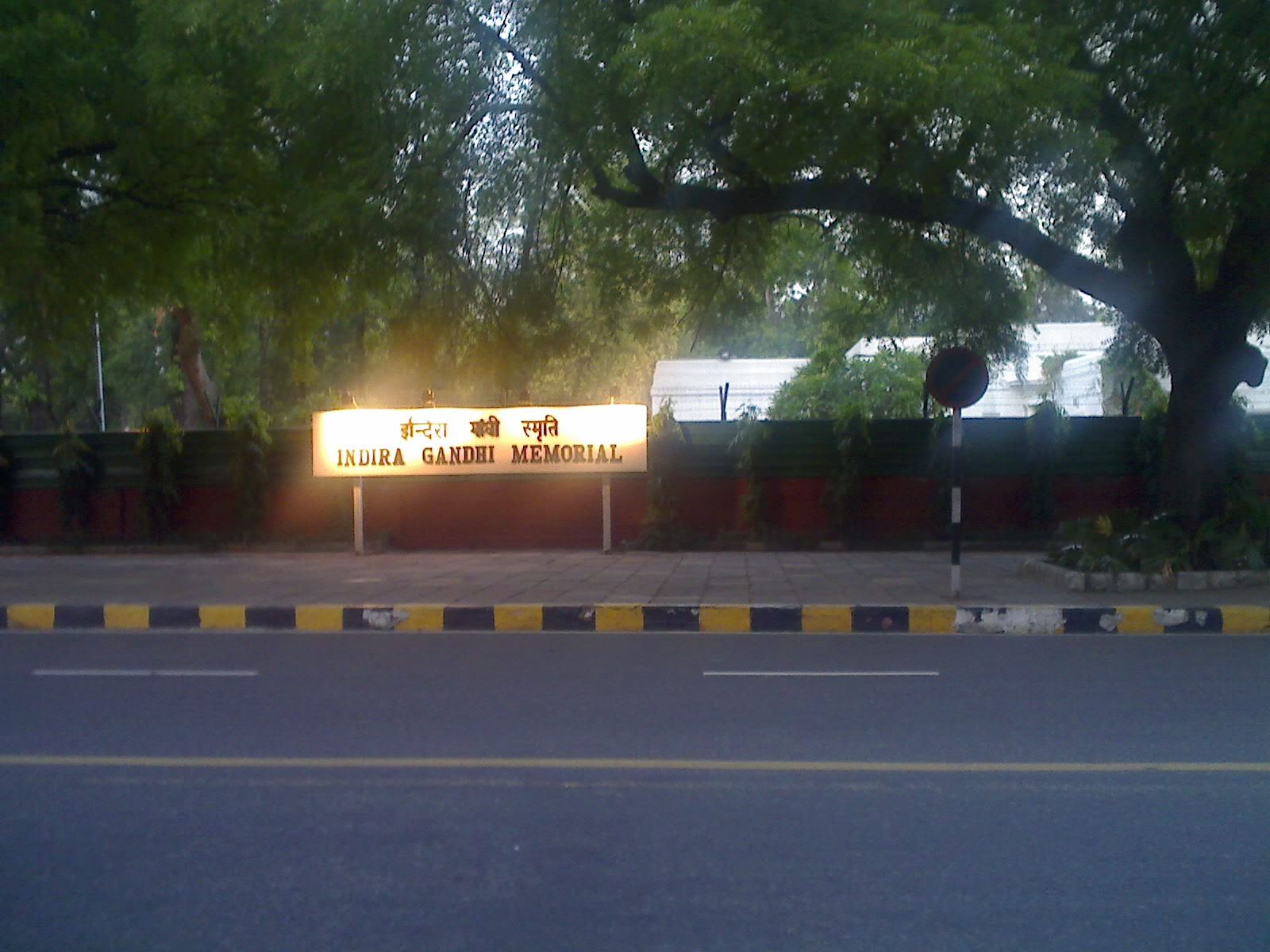
Memorial at the place of assassination, Safdarjung Road, New Delhi

Indira Gandhi, the Indian prime minister, was assassinated at 9:30 am on 31 October 1984 at her residence in Safdarjung Road, New Delhi by her two bodyguards, Satwant Singh and Beant Singh. This was after the Indian Armed Forces carried out Operation Blue Star between 1 and 8 June 1984 on Gandhi's orders. The military operation was to remove Sikh militant Jarnail Singh Bhindranwale and other Sikh separatists from the Golden Temple in Amritsar, the holiest site of Sikhism. The operation resulted in the death of many pilgrims as well as damage to the Akal Takht and the destruction of the Sikh Reference Library.

Gandhi's assassination led to the 1984 anti-Sikh riots which were instigated by nationalist mobs and political figures from the Indian National Congress (INC), Indira Gandhi's party, who orchestrated pogroms against Sikh populations throughout India. Four days of mob violence resulted in the destruction of 40 historic gurdwaras and other important Sikh holy sites. Official Indian government figures put the death toll at 3,350, while other sources have claimed that between 8,000 and over 16,000 Sikhs were killed.

== Operation Blue Star ==
Operation Blue Star was a large Indian military operation carried out between 1 and 8 June 1984, ordered by Indira Gandhi to remove leader Jarnail Singh Bhindranwale and his militant Sikh followers from the buildings of the Golden Temple complex in Amritsar.

During the operation, 229 armed Sikh militants were killed inside the Golden Temple complex; which also led to at least 554 civilian deaths. Inside Golden temple complex, 717 dead bodies were found—501 civilians and 216 militants killed between 3 and 9 June. Eleven additional people were killed on 1 June by shooting between the Central Reserve Police Force and militants according to then Amritsar District Commissioner Ramesh Inder Singh. Regarding Indian Army personnel deaths, Lt. Gen. Prem Nath Hoon, who became General commanding officer of Western Command (1986–1987), revealed that 336 Indian Army and security forces personnel died in the operation fighting with entrenched militants led by former Major General Shabeg Singh. In sum, 1119 to 1130 total people died inside the Golden Temple complex and within Amritsar City during the operation.

The Government of India's 1984 White Paper on Operation Blue Star reported that 83 Indian Army personnel were killed and 249 were wounded during the operation. Some contemporary journalistic accounts, however, suggested higher casualties. Journalist Shekhar Gupta, who was present in Amritsar during the operation, stated that 136 army personnel were killed and around 220 injured, describing it as "the highest casualties suffered by our armed forces in a domestic operation in 24 hours." In sum, 919 to 930 total people died inside the Golden Temple complex and within Amritsar City during the operation.

Other sources estimate around 5,000 civilian and 700 military personnel deaths in around the complex and in Amritsar during the operation. The Operation also caused serious damage to two of the holiest Sikh shrines, the Golden Temple and Akal Takht, as well as the destruction of the Sikh Reference Library.

The perceived threat to Gandhi's life increased after the operation. Accordingly, Sikhs were removed from her personal bodyguard detail by the Intelligence Bureau for fear of assassination. Gandhi feared that this would reinforce her anti-Sikh image among the public, however, so she ordered the Delhi Police to reinstate her Sikh bodyguards, including Beant Singh, reportedly her personal favourite.

== Assassination ==
=== Attack ===
At about 9:20 a.m. Indian Standard Time on 31 October 1984, Gandhi was on her way to be interviewed by British actor Peter Ustinov, who was filming a documentary for Irish television. She was accompanied by her personal secretary R. K. Dhawan, personal security officer Rameshwar Dayal, and Constable Narayan Singh. She was walking through the garden of the Prime Minister's Residence at No. 1 Safdarjung Road in New Delhi towards the neighbouring 1 Akbar Road office. Gandhi was not wearing her bulletproof vest that day, which she had been advised to wear at all times after Operation Blue Star.

Gandhi passed a wicket gate guarded by Constable Satwant and Sub-Inspector Beant Singh, and the two men opened fire. Beant fired three rounds into her abdomen from his .38 (9.7 mm) revolver; Satwant then fired 30 rounds from his Sterling sub-machine gun as she fell to the ground. Both men then threw down their weapons and Beant said, "I have done what I had to do. You do what you want to do." In the next six minutes, Border Police officers Tarsem Singh Jamwal and Ram Saran captured and killed Beant, while Satwant was arrested by Gandhi's other bodyguards along with an accomplice trying to escape; he was seriously wounded. Satwant Singh was tried, convicted, and sentenced to death for killing Gandhi. He was hanged in 1989, along with accomplice Kehar Singh.

Salma Sultan gave the first news of the assassination of Gandhi on Doordarshan's evening news on 31 October 1984, more than ten hours after she was killed. It is alleged by the Indian government that Gandhi's secretary R. K. Dhawan overruled intelligence and security officials who had ordered the removal of policemen as a security threat, including her assassins.

Beant was one of Gandhi's favourite guards, whom she had known for ten years. Because he was a Sikh, he had been taken off her staff after Operation Blue Star, yet Gandhi had made sure that he was reinstated. Satwant was 22 years old at the time of the assassination, and had been assigned to Gandhi's guard just five months earlier.

=== Declared death ===
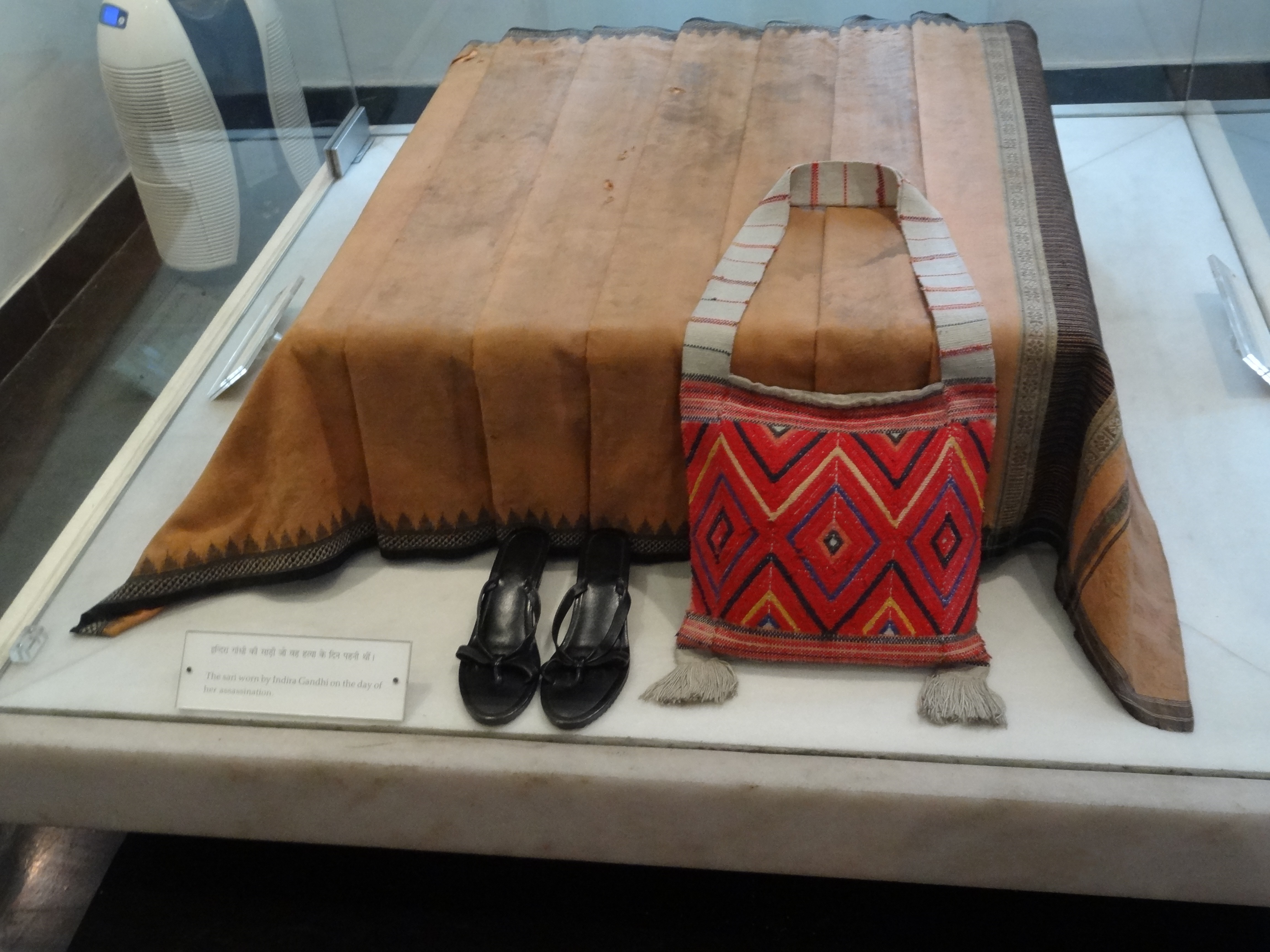
Gandhi's blood-stained Sambalpuri sari and her belongings at the time of her assassination, preserved at the Indira Gandhi Memorial Museum in New Delhi.

Gandhi was taken to the All India Institute of Medical Sciences, New Delhi (AIIMS) at 9:30 a.m. AIIMS director-designate Sneh Bhargava wrote that though Gandhi was clinically dead upon arrival, doctors had to keep up appearances and continue to operate on her until her son Rajiv Gandhi could be sworn in as prime minister. She was declared dead at 2:20 p.m. The postmortem examination was conducted by a team of doctors headed by Tirath Das Dogra, who stated that 30 bullets had struck Gandhi from a Sterling sub-machine gun and a revolver. The assailants had fired 33 bullets at her, of which 30 had hit; 23 had passed through her body, while seven remained inside. Dogra extracted bullets to establish the identity of the weapons and to correlate each weapon with the bullets recovered by ballistic examination. The bullets were matched to the weapons at CFSL Delhi.

=== National mourning ===
The Indian government ordered a national mourning from 1 to 12 November with flags half-masted and cancelled entertainment and cultural events and closed offices for several days. Tanzania declared seven days of mourning, Uganda five, and Cuba four. Pakistan, Vietnam, Brazil, Nicaragua, Gabon and Uruguay each declared three days of mourning. Portugal declared two days of mourning, Yugoslavia, Bulgaria, Cyprus, the Mongolian People's Republic and Mauritius declared a day of national mourning. Queen Elizabeth II of the United Kingdom, expressed shock at Indira Gandhi's assassination, describing it as the loss of one of the world's most distinguished leaders. British Prime Minister Margaret Thatcher, dressed in black, told the House of Commons that India had been deprived of a leader of incomparable courage, vision and humanity, describing Gandhi as a wise colleague and close personal friend. US President Ronald Reagan, Soviet President Konstantin Chernenko and other world leaders also expressed grief over her death.

=== Funeral ===
Gandhi's body was taken in a gun carriage through Delhi roads on the morning of 1 November to Teen Murti Bhavan, where her father stayed and where she lay in state. She was cremated with full state honours on 3 November near Raj Ghat, a memorial to Mahatma Gandhi, at an area named Shakti Sthal. Her elder son and successor, Rajiv Gandhi, lit the pyre.

Among the foreign dignitaries who attended the state funeral were:

Country	Dignitaries
Afghanistan	Chairman of the Council of Ministers Sultan Ali Keshtmand
Algeria	Prime Minister Abdelhamid Brahimi
Argentina	Vice President Víctor Hipólito Martínez
Australia	Governor-General Ninian Stephen; Prime Minister Bob Hawke
Bangladesh	President Hussain Muhammad Ershad
Belgium	Deputy Prime Minister Charles-Ferdinand Nothomb
Bhutan	King Jigme Singye Wangchuck
Bulgaria	General Secretary of the Central Committee of the Bulgarian Communist Party Todor Zhivkov
Burma	Chairman of the Burma Socialist Programme Party Ne Win
Canada	Chief Justice Brian Dickson; Secretary of State for External Affairs Joe Clark
China	Vice Premier Yao Yilin
Cyprus	President Spyros Kyprianou
Czechoslovakia	Prime Minister Lubomír Štrougal
Fiji	Governor-General Penaia Ganilau; Prime Minister Kamisese Mara
Finland	Prime Minister Kalevi Sorsa
France	Prime Minister Laurent Fabius
East Germany	President of the People's Chamber Horst Sindermann
West Germany	Vice Chancellor and Minister of Foreign Affairs Hans-Dietrich Genscher
Greece	Prime Minister Andreas Papandreou
Guyana	Prime Minister Desmond Hoyte
Indonesia	Vice President Umar Wirahadikusumah
Ireland	Taoiseach Garret FitzGerald
Italy	Minister of Foreign Affairs Giulio Andreotti
Japan	Prime Minister Yasuhiro Nakasone
Jordan	Crown Prince Hassan bin Talal
Kampuchea	President of the Council of State Heng Samrin; Prime Minister Chan Sy
Kenya	Vice President Mwai Kibaki
North Korea	Vice President Pak Song-chol
South Korea	Speaker of the National Assembly Chae Mun-shik
Laos	President Souphanouvong; Prime Minister Kaysone Phomvihane
Liberia	Vice President Harry Moniba
Libya	Secretary-General of the General People's Congress Mifta al-Usta Umar
Madagascar	President Didier Ratsiraka
Malaysia	Deputy Prime Minister Musa Hitam
Maldives	Minister of Foreign Affairs Fathulla Jameel
Mauritius	Prime Minister Anerood Jugnauth
Mongolia	First Deputy Chairman of the Council of Ministers Tumenbayaryn Ragchaa
Mozambique	President Samora Machel
Nauru	President Hammer DeRoburt
Nepal	Prime Minister Lokendra Bahadur Chand
Netherlands	Prince Claus
New Zealand	Governor-General David Beattie; Prime Minister David Lange
Norway	Minister of Foreign Affairs Svenn Stray
Pakistan	President Zia-ul-Haq
Philippines	First Lady Imelda Marcos
Poland	Chairman of the Council of State Henryk Jabłoński; Prime Minister Wojciech Jaruzelski
Portugal	Prime Minister Mário Soares
Soviet Union	Chairman of the Council of Ministers Nikolai Tikhonov
Spain	Prime Minister Felipe González
Sri Lanka	President J. R. Jayewardene Former Prime Minister Sirimavo Bandaranaike
Sweden	Minister for Foreign Affairs Lennart Bodström
Syria	Vice President Zuhair Masharqa; Minister of Foreign Affairs Farouk al-Sharaa
Tanzania	President Julius Nyerere
Turkey	Deputy Prime Minister Kaya Erdem
Uganda	President Milton Obote
United Arab Emirates	Deputy Prime Minister Hamdan bin Mohammed Al Nahyan
United Kingdom	Prime Minister Margaret Thatcher; Princess Anne (representing Queen Elizabeth II)
United States	Secretary of State George Shultz
Vanuatu	President Ati George Sokomanu; Prime Minister Walter Lini
Vietnam	President Trường Chinh; Prime Minister Phạm Văn Đồng
North Yemen	Prime Minister Abdul Aziz Abdul Ghani
Yugoslavia	President Veselin Đuranović; Prime Minister Milka Planinc
Zambia	President Kenneth Kaunda
Zimbabwe	Prime Minister Robert Mugabe

== Aftermath ==
Over the next four days, 8,000 Sikhs were killed in retaliatory violence. Other sources record well over 25,000 deaths of Sikhs.

The Justice Thakkar Commission of Inquiry, headed by Justice Manharlal Pranlal Thakkar, set up to probe Gandhi's assassination, recommended a separate probe for the conspiracy angle behind the assassination. The Thakkar Report stated that the "needle of suspicion" pointed at R. K. Dhawan for complicity in the conspiracy.

Satwant Singh and co-conspirator Kehar Singh were sentenced to death. Both were executed on 6 January 1989.

A Punjabi movie titled Kaum De Heere (Gems of the Community) highlighting the roles/lives of the two guards who assassinated Indira Gandhi was set to be released on 22 August 2014, but was banned by the Indian government for five years.

== See also ==
- Assassination of Rajiv Gandhi, the otherwise unrelated killing of Indira's son and successor as Prime Minister
- Domestic policy of the Indira Gandhi government
- Insurgency in Punjab, India
- List of things named after Indira Gandhi
