= Robin Banerjee =

Indian documentary filmmaker (1908–2003)

- Robin Banerjee in his later years
- Born: 12 August 1908; Baharampur, Bengal Presidency, British Raj (now West Bengal, India)
- Died: 6 August 2003 (aged 94); Golaghat, Assam, India
- Occupations: environmentalist, painter, photographer, documentary filmmaker
- Awards: Padma Shri (1971)

Robin Banerjee (12 August 1908 – 6 August 2003) was a wildlife expert, environmentalist, painter, photographer and documentary filmmaker who lived at Golaghat in the Indian state of Assam.

== Early life and education ==
Robin Banerjee was born on 12 August 1908 at Baharampur in West Bengal and received primary schooling at Santiniketan. He went on to pursue medical education at the prestigious Calcutta Medical College in Kolkata, and later at Liverpool (1934) and Edinburgh (1936).

== Career ==
Banerjee had joined the Royal Navy in 1937 at Liverpool, and saw action in World War II. After the war, Banerjee decided to move back to India. In 1952, he visited Assam as a locum-tenens to a Scottish doctor. in 1952 he joined Chabua Tea Estate, Assam, as Chief Medical Officer, and later moved to the Dhansiri Medical Association, Bokakhat as the Chief Medical Officer.

During a visit to Kaziranga National Park some time in the 1950s, Banerjee fell in love with the wilds of Assam and decided to settle down at Golaghat, near Kaziranga. Banerjee's first film on the Kaziranga National Park (one of the most important refuges of the Indian rhinoceros) on Berlin TV in 1961 was one of the first widely distributed media items on the park to reach Western audiences. It also garnered him international recognition as a wildlife film-maker. He made 32 documentaries in his career as a film-maker, and was the recipient of 14 international awards.

Banerjee remained a bachelor, and worked actively as an environmentalist besides his film-making career. Well known and loved among the local community as "Uncle Robin", he donated lands for setting up the local school, and health camps. He was particularly active regarding issues concerning Kaziranga National Park and was the founder of the non-governmental organization Kaziranga Wildlife Society, which actively protects the interests of the park.

== Recognition and remembrance ==
He was awarded the Padma Shri in 1971, an honorary Doctorate of Science from Assam Agricultural University (AAU) in 1991, and also an honorary PhD from Dibrugarh University. A book based on his life and experiences has been written in Assamese named "Xeujia Xopunar Manuh".

=== Uncle Robin's Museum ===
Uncle Robin's Museum Natural History Museum
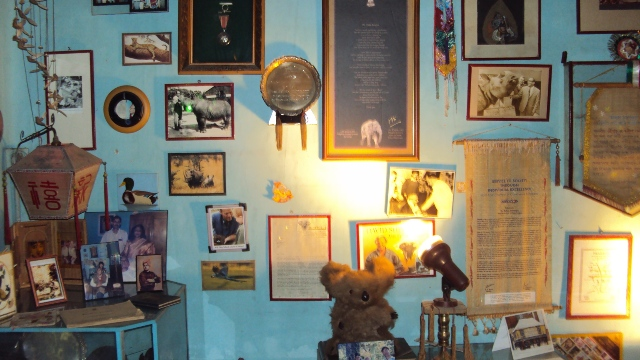
- Inside the Robin Banerjee Museum.
- Established: 1990; 36 years ago
- Location: Mission Road, Golaghat
- Coordinates: 26.51°N 93.96°E
- Type: Science Museum

Banerjee's house on Mission Road in Golaghat is a tourist spot for wildlife lovers and, in 2009, was converted into a natural history museum and contains a large number of his photographs and paintings. It is named Uncle Robin's Museum, containing natural history items from all over India (especially Kaziranga), and other personal collections of Robin Banerjee, including a set of toys from across the world that he collected.

The Natural History Museum or the Uncle Robin's Museum also known as the Robin Banerjee Museum is a Science and History Museum located on Mission Road in the tea city of Golaghat. The museum is contains dolls, artefacts, mementos, movies and other personal collections of Dr Banerjee's lifetime. There are 587 dolls and 262 other show pieces.

==== History ====
Uncle Robin's Museum is situated in the house of the late Dr. Robin Banerjee, a Padma Shri awardee naturalist and environmentalist in Golaghat.

It was named Uncle Robin’s Museum, containing natural history items from all over India (especially Kaziranga), and other personal collections of Dr. Robin Banerjee.

Today it is a tourist spot for wildlife lovers, and for other enthusiasts to see a large number of Banerjee's photographs and paintings.

The museum is jointly maintained by ABITA (Assam Branch of Indian Tea Association) and Golaghat District administration.

== Filmography ==
Robin Banerjee altogether made 32 documentaries, as listed below:

- Kaziranga (50 min)
- Wild Life of India (35 min)
- Rhino Capture (30 min)
- A Day at Zoo (45 min)
- Elephant Capture (20 min)
- Monsoon (20 min)
- Nagaland (30 min)
- Echidna, & On Wild Fowls (Australia)
- Lake Wildness (35 min)
- 26 January (India) (40 min)
- Flying Reptiles of Indonesia (50 min)
- Through These Doors (35 min)
- Animals of Africa (50 min)
- Underwater (50 min)
- Peace Game (30 min)
- Flowers of Africa (40 min)
- Adventures of Newfoundland (45 min)
- Dragons of Komodo Island (35 min)
- Underwater World of Snakes (50 min)
- White Wings in Slow Motion (winner of the Madame Pompidou Award) (60 min)
- The World of Flamingo (50 min)
- Wild but Friendly (55 min)
- Birds of Africa (45 min)
- Dresden (60 min)
- My Nature (60 min)
- Birds of India (50 min)
- Wild Flowers of the world (45 min)
- The Monarch Butterfly of Mexico (60 min)
- Alaskan Polar Bear (180 min)
- In the Pacific (55 min)
- Call of the Blue Pacific part I & II (45 min)
- So They May Survive (40 min)

== See also ==
Science and Nature Museum, Golaghat
