= Prem Nath Sahni =

Indian administrator

Prem Nath Sahni (1916-1990) was an Indian administrator who played an active role in industry., social life, administration, and sports of India for four decades. The Government of India honoured him with the Padma Shri in 1971 for his contributions to trade and industry.

== Early life ==
Sahni was born on 9 August 1916 in Lahore, British India to Lala Gurdas Ram Sahni an agricultural land holder with substantial land holdings. He was the oldest of three children of Lala Gurdas Ram sahni from his second wife who died within a month of giving birth to his sister, Nando (Nand Rani), eight years younger to him in 1924. P. N. Sahni completed a double Master of Arts degree in political Science as well as History from Government College at Lahore now known as the Government College University (Lahore). He was an enthusiastic hockey player in college and this interest in sports lasted with him through life. Subsequent to college studies in Lahore, he proceeded for doctoral studies in UK but the program was interrupted because of the second world war.

== Provincial Transport Controller ==
Sahni was appointed to the Indian Administrative Service with effect from 25 December 1957 by the President of India through a Gazette notification. One of the earliest administrative appointments of P. N. sahni was as the Provincial transport Controller of Punjab, India. During this period he was recognized for his excellent administrative capabilities and compassionate dealing. He introduced a system of concession for financially weak students upon certification by their schools as well as others in need.

== Director of Industries ==
During the sixties P. N. Sahni assumed the role of Director of Industries of Punjab. In 1966 the state of Punjab was divided in two with a new state Haryana being born from it. While the focus of Punjab remained on agriculture due to well irrigated lands, that of Haryana became industrialization. Sahni shifted to this new state and continued to play a prominent role in its industrialization, a role that was recognized later by an award for contributions to trade and industry by the Government of India.

== Role in Indian hockey ==
During the seventies P. N. Sahni was an active participant in the Indian Olympic Association. P. N. Sahni took over stewardship of the Indian Hockey Federation in 1973 at a time when conflicts broke out between its Northern and Southern wings. The Indian Hockey scene was marked by excellence until 1973 when Ashwani Kumar the then president stepped down followed by a spell of chaos in the organization. There was a conflict between the North and South blocs of the federation. P.N. Sahni belonged to the North bloc and that was the heartland of hockey in India. But one M. A. M. Ramaswamy, a rich millionaire from the southern block struggled to capture the presidency and succeeded because of support form the southern lobby in the Union government. It seems that this feud and the passing of control of Indian hockey to the southern wing led to the downfall of hockey standards in India. It lost its supremacy in the game on the world stage ever since winning a medal only once in the Olympic games in 1980. P N Sahni remained the President of the Haryana Olympic Association from 1969 to 1978

== Electricity Board ==
In the early seventies, during his appointment as the Chairman of an Electricity Board in India, P N Sahni had to contend with numerous problems of employees union. He nevertheless managed to steer the board in a way so as to improve overall availability of electricity in the province much needed for the then rapidly industrializing Haryana state of Northern India. Sahni retired from Chairmanship of Haryana State Electricity Board on 5 March 1975, after serving this Organisation for six years. During his tenure, Haryana achieved 100% village electrification

== Death ==
He died in 1990 in Mumbai from a sudden cardiac arrest while on a brief visit to that city to witness a cricket match. He was survived by a daughter and wife, Vimla Sahni at that time.

== See also ==
- List of Padma Shri award recipients (1970–1979)
