= Indian Hockey Federation =

Sports governing body, 1925–2014

- Sport: Field Hockey
- Jurisdiction: India
- Abbreviation: IHF
- Founded: 1925; 101 years ago
- Closure date: 2014

The Indian Hockey Federation was the administrative body of field hockey in India. Incorporated in 1925, it was under the global jurisdiction of the International Hockey Federation.

== Background ==
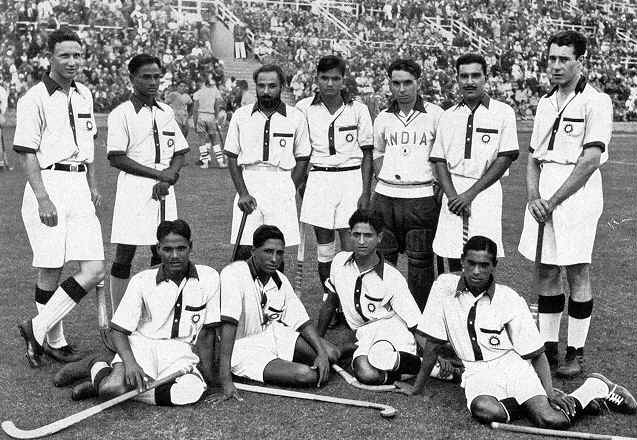
India's field hockey team in Berlin, 1936, captained by Dhyan Chand (standing second from left) the gold medal winner

The IHF was formed on 7 November 1925 in Gwalior. India was the first non-European team to be a part of the FIH. As a member of the International Hockey Federation, it represented India in all international matches under the former leadership of KPS Gill & the secretary of the federation, K. Jyothikumaran. The women's team was directed by the Indian Women's Hockey Federation.

Prem Nath Sahni, an Indian Administrative Service officer with interest in hockey since his college days, took over stewardship of the Indian Hockey Federation in 1973, at a time when conflicts broke out between its Northern and Southern wings. The Indian Hockey scene was marked by excellence until 1973 when Ashwani Kumar, the then president, stepped down. India lost its supremacy in the game on the world stage ever since. P N Sahni remained the President of the Haryana Olympic Association from 1969 to 1978

== Suspension ==
Kandaswamy Jothikumaran of the IOA resigned after a television show accused the federation's secretary of corruption in April 2008. K. P. S. Gill, IHF chief for 15 years, lost his position when the federation was suspended by the Indian Olympic Association (IOA) on 28 April.

== Dissolution ==
The Indian Olympic Association appointed a new five-member national selection committee. This panel works in conjunction with the International Hockey Federation. The panel was headed by Narala Saikiran, a former MP and former hockey captain and included Ashok Kumar, Ajit Pal Singh, Zafar Iqbal, and Dhanraj Pillay.

Hockey India is the new governing body of field hockey in India. In a significant way forward, Indian Hockey Federation and Hockey India on 25 July 2011 signed an agreement leading up to formation of a joint executive board.

IHF was disbanded in 2014, following the Indian Government's recognition of Hockey India as the sole body responsible towards governing field hockey in India.

== See also ==
- India men's national field hockey team
- India women's national field hockey team
