= R. V. S. Mani =

Indian civil servant and author

- Born: Ramaswamy Venkata Subra Mani; 29 October 1959 (age 66); Delhi
- Education: University of Delhi; University of Manchester
- Occupations: Former civil servant, author and visiting professor
- Awards: Padma Shri (2026)

Ramaswamy Venkata Subra Mani (born 29 October 1959), commonly known as R. V. S. Mani is an Indian former civil servant, author and visiting professor. A member of the Central Secretariat Service, he served as an Under Secretary to Government of India in the Internal Security Division of the Ministry of Home Affairs (MHA) and later as a Deputy Secretary (Finance) at the Ministry of Textiles.

He is best known as a whistleblower in the 2004 Ishrat Jahan encounter killing. He was the officer who signed two affidavits in the case, filed on 6 August 2009 and 30 September 2009. The first affidavit stated that the four victims were terrorists, while the second contradicted this and suggested a lack of clear evidence. In 2016, he alleged that he had been ordered to sign the second affidavit, and that the SIT chief Satish Verma had tortured him with cigarette stubs during his examination in 2013. He alleged that it was a fake encounter and that the Congress-led UPA government wanted to implicate Gujarat intelligence officers. He later turned author, and has written several books against the narrative of Hindu terrorism, propagated during the UPA government.

In 2026, he was awarded the Padma Shri, fourth-highest civilian award of the Republic of India for civil service, by Government of India. He is one of only two recipients to receive the honor in the civil service category that year.

== Early life and education ==
Mani was born and brought up in Delhi, as his father K.R. Ramaswamy served in the Ministry of Home Affairs. He holds a master's degree in sociology, an LL.B. from the University of Delhi, and an M.Sc. in Human Resource Development from the University of Manchester.

== Career ==
Mani was a member of the Central Secretariat Service and held assignments in several Union government ministries. He served as an under-secretary in the Internal Security Division of the Ministry of Home Affairs from 2006 to 2010. Early on in his Mani involved post-blast responsibilities following the 2006 Varanasi bombings at Varanasi cantonment and the Sankat Mochan Hanuman Temple, and worked in the Home Ministry control room during the 2008 Mumbai attacks. During his tenure at the Home ministry the document he created on the Status of Internal Security of India, later became a Manual for all the Divisions in Ministry of Home Affairs (MHA) dealing with sensitive cases. In 2014, he served in the Ministry of Urban Development, 2017 he became deputy secretary in the Ministry of Textiles.

=== Ishrat Jahan affidavits ===
In 2009, while serving in the Home Ministry, Mani signed two Union government affidavits filed before the Gujarat High Court in proceedings concerning the 2004 Ishrat Jahan encounter killing along with three men. The first affidavit, dated 6 August 2009, cited central intelligence inputs that described the four as being associated with a Lashkar-e-Taiba module. A supplementary affidavit filed in late September stated that intelligence inputs did not by themselves constitute conclusive proof, that the Union government did not condone unjustified or excessive action, and that it would not oppose an independent inquiry or an investigation by the Central Bureau of Investigation (CBI).

Mani later said that he had drafted the first affidavit under the guidance of senior officers, but had not drafted the supplementary affidavit and had signed and filed it because he was acting under official orders. In a 2016 statement in Parliament, Home Minister Rajnath Singh said that the supplementary affidavit had been vetted by the attorney general and approved by then home minister P. Chidambaram, while the file notings did not record a reason for revising the government's position.

In 2013, Mani complained to his superiors that Satish Verma, a member of the court-appointed Special Investigation Team (SIT) assisting the CBI, had attempted to coerce him into signing a statement implicating senior Intelligence Bureau officials. The CBI denied that Mani had been forced to sign any statement. In an affidavit submitted to the Supreme Court in 2014, Mani alleged that CBI officers had subsequently harassed, followed and pressured him because he would not implicate his former superiors. In 2016, Mani further alleged that Verma had abused him and burned him with cigarettes during questioning in 2013. Verma denied torturing Mani and maintained the investigation team's conclusion that the encounter had been staged.

In August 2013, while serving as an under-secretary in the Ministry of Urban Development, Mani sought voluntary retirement from government service. His lawyer attributed the application to alleged harassment following Mani's questioning in the Ishrat Jahan investigation, although Mani's retirement letter did not itself mention harassment.

=== Writing and academic work ===
After his retirement from government service, he remained Visiting Professor at Sharda University, Agra. Mani wrote books and articles on internal security, public administration and politics. In 2018 he published, The Myth of Hindu Terror: Insider Account of Ministry of Home Affairs 2006–2010 (2018), followed by Deception: A Family That Deceived the Whole Nation in 2021, and When Mani Writes in 2022, s a collection of his previously published articles.

== Honors and awards ==
- Padma Shri for civil service, 2026.

== Selected works ==
- Mani, R. V. S. (2018). The Myth of Hindu Terror: Insider Account of Ministry of Home Affairs 2006–2010. Vitasta Publishing. ISBN 9789386473271.
- Mani, R. V. S. (2019). Bhagva Aatank Ek Shadyantra भगवा आतंक एक षड़यंत्र (in Hindi). Vitasta Publishing. ISBN 9789386473592.
- Mani, R. V. S. (2021). Deception: A Family That Deceived the Whole Nation. Notion Press. ISBN 9781638735670.
- Mani, R. V. S. (2022). When Mani Writes: “Hindu Terror” Whistleblower Unravels Complex Contemporary Internal Security and Political Scenario. Garuda Prakashan. ISBN 9798885750028.
- Mani, R. V. S. (2023). Rashtra Se Dhoka: Bharat Ko Dhoka Dene Waale Ek Siyaasi Kunbe Ki Kahani राष्ट्र से धोखा (in Hindi). Translated by Thakur, Mahendra. Notion Press. ISBN 9798890266811.
- Mani, R. V. S. (2024). Dalals. RARE Publications. ISBN 9789383826735.
