= Ratna Fabri =

Indian museologist

Ratna Fabri was an Indian museologist and an artistwho was awarded Padma Shri in 1970 in the Art field for her achievements. Ratna Fabri had studied museums in America and Europe and had displayed arrangements in the Indian pavilion in the Montreal exhibition.

She was married to Charles Fabri, a Hungarian émigré. She hailed from Rajasthan.
