= Domestic policy of the Indira Gandhi government =

Government policies of India

The Domestic policy of the Indira Gandhi government was the domestic policy of India from 1966 to 1984 during the premiership of Indira Gandhi until her assassination in 1984. Designed to covers a wide range of areas, including to increased focus on developing national security, social welfare, economic and social affair, money and taxes.

== Nationalisation ==
Despite the provisions, control and regulations of Reserve Bank of India, most banks in India had continued to be owned and operated by private persons. Businessmen who owned the banks were often accused of channeling the deposits into their own companies, and ignoring the priority sector. Furthermore, there was a great resentment against class banking in India, which had left the poor (the majority population) unbanked. After becoming prime minister, Gandhi expressed the intention of nationalising the banks in a paper titled, "Stray thoughts on Bank Nationalisation" in order to alleviate poverty. The paper received the overwhelming support of the public. In 1969, Gandhi moved to nationalise fourteen major commercial banks. After the nationalisation of banks, the branches of the public sector banks in India rose to approximate 800 percent in deposits, and advances took a huge jump by 11,000 percent. Nationalisation also resulted in a significant growth in the geographical coverage of banks; the number of bank branches rose from 8,200 to over 62,000, most of which were opened in the unbanked, rural areas. The nationalization drive not only helped to increase household savings, but it also provided considerable investments in the informal sector, in small and medium-sized enterprises, and in agriculture, and contributed significantly to regional development and to the expansion of India's industrial and agricultural base. Jayaprakash Narayan, who became famous for leading the opposition to Gandhi in the 1970s, was solid in his praise for her bank nationalisations.

Having been re-elected in 1971 on a nationalisation platform, Gandhi proceeded to nationalise the coal, steel, copper, refining, cotton textiles, and insurance industries. Most of these nationalisations were made to protect employment and the interest of the organised labour. The remaining private sector industries were placed under strict regulatory control.

During the Indo-Pakistani War of 1971, foreign-owned private oil companies had refused to supply fuel to the Indian Navy and Indian Air Force. In response, Gandhi nationalised oil companies in 1973. After nationalisation the oil majors such as the Indian Oil Corporation (IOC), the Hindustan Petroleum Corporation (HPCL) and the Bharat Petroleum Corporation (BPCL) had to keep a minimum stock level of oil, to be supplied to the military when needed.

== Administration ==
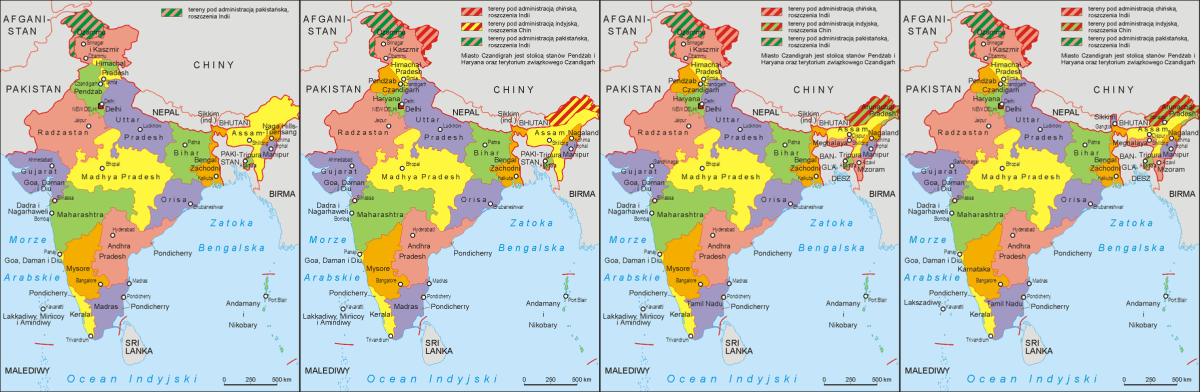
Administrative divisions of India 1961–1975. Gandhi established six states, Haryana (1966), Himachal Pradesh (1971), Meghalaya, Manipur and Tripura (all 1972), and finally Sikkim (1975), bringing up the total of states to 22. She also established Arunachal Pradesh and Mizoram (1972) as Union Territories

In 1966, Gandhi accepted the demands of the Akalis to reorganize Punjab on linguistic lines. The Hindi-speaking southern half of Punjab became a separate state, Haryana, while the Pahari speaking hilly areas in the north east were joined to Himachal Pradesh. In doing so, she had hoped to ward off the growing political conflict between Hindu and Sikh groups in the region. However, a contentious issue that was considered unresolved by the Akalis was the status of Chandigarh, a prosperous city on the Punjab-Haryana border, which Gandhi declared a union territory to be shared as a capital by both the states.

Victory over Pakistan in 1971 consolidated Indian power in Kashmir. Gandhi indicated that she would make no major concessions on Kashmir. The most prominent of the Kashmiri separatists, Sheikh Abdullah, had to recognize India's control over Kashmir in light of the new order in South Asia. The situation was normalized in the years following the war after Abdullah agreed to an accord with Gandhi, by giving up the demand for a plebiscite in return for a special autonomous status for Kashmir. In 1975, Gandhi declared the state of Jammu and Kashmir as a constituent unit of India. The Kashmir conflict remained largely peaceful if frozen under Gandhi's premiership.

In 1972, Gandhi granted statehood to Meghalaya, Manipur and Tripura, while the North-East Frontier Agency was declared a union territory and renamed Arunachal Pradesh. The transition to statehood for these territories was successfully overseen by her administration. This was followed by the annexation of Sikkim in 1975.

== Social reform ==
The principle of equal pay for equal work for both men and women was enshrined in the Indian Constitution under the Gandhi administration.

Gandhi questioned the continued existence of a privy purse for former rulers of princely states. She argued the case for abolition based on equal rights for all citizens and the need to reduce the government's revenue deficit. The nobility responded by rallying around the Jana Sangh and other right-wing parties that stood in opposition to Gandhi's attempts to abolish royal privileges. The motion to abolish privy purses, and the official recognition of the titles, was originally brought before the Parliament in 1970. It was passed in the Lok Sabha but felt short of the two-thirds majority in the Rajya Sabha by a single vote. Gandhi responded by having a Presidential proclamation issued; de-recognizing the princes; with this withdrawal of recognition, their claims to privy purses were also legally lost. However, the proclamation was struck down by the Supreme Court of India. In 1971, Gandhi again motioned to abolish the privy purse. This time, it was successfully passed as the 26th Amendment to the Constitution of India. Many royals tried to protest the abolition of the privy purse, primarily through campaigns to contest seats in elections. They, however, received a final setback when many of them were defeated by huge margins.

Gandhi claimed that only "clear vision, iron will and the strictest discipline" can remove poverty. She justified the imposition of the state of emergency in 1975 in the name of the socialist mission of the Congress. Armed with the power to rule by decree and without constitutional constraints, Gandhi embarked on a massive redistribution program. The provisions included rapid enforcement of land ceilings, housing for landless labourers, the abolition of bonded labour and a moratorium on the debts of the poor. North India was at the centre of the reforms; millions of acres of land were acquired and redistributed. The government was also successful in procuring houses for landless labourers; according to Frankel, three-fourths of the targeted four million houses was achieved in 1975 alone. Nevertheless, others have disputed the success of the program and criticized Gandhi for not doing enough to reform land ownership. The political economist, Jyotindra Das Gupta, cryptically questioned "...whether or not the real supporters of land-holders were in jail or in power?" Critics also accused Gandhi of choosing to "talk left and act right", referring to her concurrent pro-business decisions and endeavours. Rosser wrote that "some have even seen the declaration of emergency rule in 1975 as a move to suppress dissent against Gandhi's policy shift to the right." Regardless of the controversy over the nature of the reforms, the long-term effects of the social changes gave rise to prominence of middle-ranking farmers from intermediate and lower castes in North India. The rise of these newly empowered social classes challenged the political establishment of the Hindi Belt in the years to come.

== Language policy ==
Under the Constitution of India of 1950, Hindi was to have become the official national language by 1965. This was not acceptable to many non-Hindi speaking states, who wanted the continued use of English in government. In 1967, Gandhi made a constitutional amendment that guaranteed the de facto use of both Hindi and English as official languages. This established the official government policy of bilingualism in India and satisfied the non-Hindi speaking Indian states. Gandhi thus put herself forward as a leader with a pan-Indian vision. Nevertheless, critics alleged that her stance was actually meant to weaken the position of rival Congress leaders from the northern states such as Uttar Pradesh, where there had been strong, sometimes violent, pro-Hindi agitations. Gandhi came out of the language conflicts with the strong support of the south Indian populace.

== National security ==
In the late 1960s and 1970s, Gandhi had the Indian army crush militant Communist uprisings in the Indian state of West Bengal. The communist insurgency in India was completely suppressed during the state of emergency.

Gandhi considered the north-eastern regions important, because of its strategic situation. In 1966, the Mizo uprising took place against the government of India and overran almost the whole of the Mizoram region. Gandhi ordered the Indian Army to launch massive retaliatory strikes in response. The rebellion was suppressed with the Indian Air Force even carrying out airstrikes in Aizawl; this remains the only instance of India carrying out an airstrike in its own civilian territory. The defeat of Pakistan in 1971 and the secession of East Pakistan as pro-India Bangladesh led to the collapse of the Mizo separatist movement. In 1972, after the less extremist Mizo leaders came to the negotiating table, Gandhi upgraded Mizoram to the status of a union territory. A small-scale insurgency by some militants continued into the late 1970s but was successfully dealt with by the government. The Mizo conflict was definitively resolved during the administration of Gandhi's son Rajiv. Today, Mizoram is considered as one of the most peaceful states in the north-east.

Responding to the insurgency in Nagaland, Gandhi "unleashed a powerful military offensive" in the 1970s. Finally, a massive crackdown on the insurgents took place during the state of emergency ordered by Gandhi. The insurgents soon agreed to surrender and signed the Shillong Accord in 1975. While the agreement was considered a victory for the Indian government and ended large-scale conflicts, there has since been spurts of violence by rebel holdouts and ethnic conflict amongst the tribes.

== Nuclear program ==
Gandhi contributed and further carried out the vision of Jawaharlal Nehru, former Premier of India to develop the program. Gandhi authorized the development of nuclear weapons in 1967, in response to the Test No. 6 by People's Republic of China. Gandhi saw this test as Chinese nuclear intimidation, therefore, Gandhi promoted the views of Nehru to establish India's stability and security interests as independent from those of the nuclear superpowers.

The program became fully mature in 1974, when Dr. Raja Ramanna reported to Gandhi that India had the ability to test its first nuclear weapon. Gandhi gave verbal authorisation of this test, and preparations were made in a long-constructed army base, the Indian Army Pokhran Test Range. In 1974, India successfully conducted an underground nuclear test, unofficially code named as "Smiling Buddha", near the desert village of Pokhran in Rajasthan. As the world was quiet by this test, a vehement protest came forward from Pakistan. Great ire was raised in Pakistan and its Prime Minister, Zulfikar Ali Bhutto, described this test as "Indian hegemony" to intimidate Pakistan. In response to this Bhutto launched a massive campaign all over the Pakistan to make Pakistan a nuclear power. In these campaigns Bhutto asked the nation to get united and great slogans were raised such as hum ghaas aur pattay kha lay gay magar nuclear power ban k rhe gay (We will eat grass or leaves or even go hungry, but we will get nuclear power). Gandhi directed a letter to Bhutto and, later to the world, describing the test for peaceful purposes and India's commitment to develop its programme for industrial and scientific use.

== Environment Conservation ==
During her term as Prime Minister Indira significantly contributed to environmental protection in India through numerous legislations, conservation efforts and International advocacy on environment and bio-diversity protection. Also during her tenure the Wildlife Protection Act of 1972 was implemented along with 42nd Constitutional Amendment in 1976 which explicitly included environment protection as a function of the Indian Constitution. She launched the landmark Project Tiger and was an international voice for the protection of the planets environment. Notably she spoke as the only plenary speaker apart from the host at the first United Nations Conference on the Human Environment (UNCHE) holding poverty alleviation as an inextricable part of environmental protection. Her speech paved the path for stronger efforts in environmental conservation across the globe. The conference led to the creation of global response and watchdog bodies like the United Nations Environmental Programme (UNEP) and later the Intergovernmental Panel on Climate Change (IPCC). She also instituted the National Committee on Environmental Planning and Coordination (NCEPC) in 1972 which would later on turn into the Ministry of Environment and Forest, Government of India (currently known as the Ministry of Environment, Forest and Climate Change)
