= Khailshanker Durlabhji =

Indian jeweller

Khailshanker Durlabhji (15 November 1912 – 13 February 1992) was a notable jeweller from Jaipur city in Rajasthan state in India. He was awarded the Padma Shri by the Government of India for his promotion of trade and contributions to medical services in Rajasthan.
