= R. Ranchandra Vishwanath Wardekar =

Founder of Gandhi Memorial Leprosy Foundation

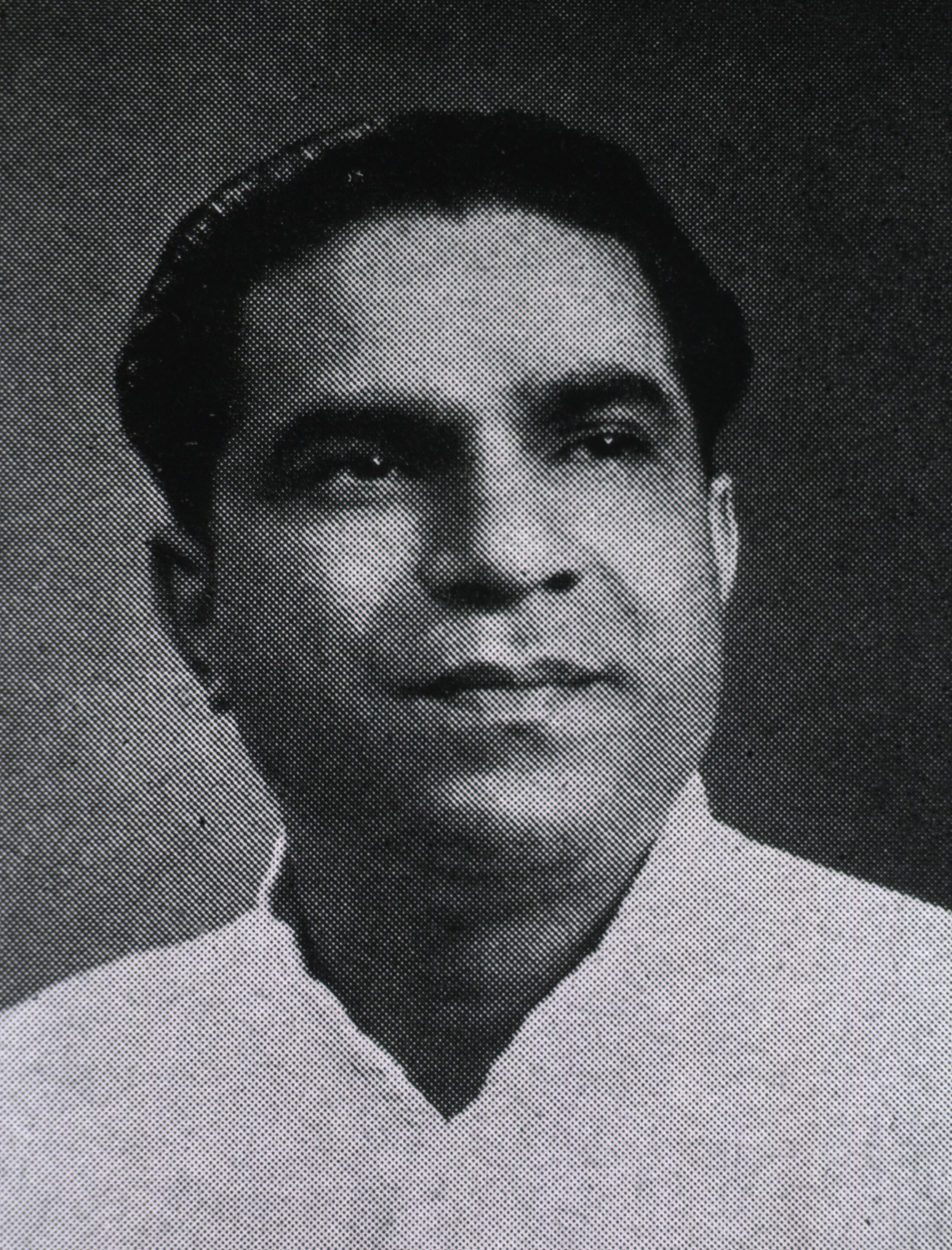
- Born: 27 October 1913; Pune, Maharashtra, India
- Died: 1 August 1996 (aged 82)
- Education: Grant Medical College (1940)
- Occupation: Doctor

R. Ranchandra Vishwanath Wardekar (27 October 1913 – 1 August 1996) was an Indian doctor and the founder of the Gandhi Memorial Leprosy Foundation. He received the Padma Shri award in 1973. He is considered "the father of leprosy control" in India.

Wardekar received his medical degree from Grant Medical College in Mumbai in 1940. He worked in private practice, but gave it up to work with Mahatma Gandhi. Wardekar became responsible for the hospital at Sevagram and the health of the people in the surrounding villages. When Gandhi died, a trust was set up for leprosy relief and the Gandhi Memorial Leprosy Foundation (GMLF) was founded. Wardekar became the Director in 1952. Wardekar treated leprosy as a public health problem instead of merely working to institutionalize patients which was the current method. He created a system of health education, case detection and "domiciliary treatment" in 13 centers throughout India. His methods became accepted practice throughout India and the World Health Organization, with whom he briefly consulted, also began using his approach.

Wardekar retired in 1973 and devoted the remainder of his life to studying scripture. He received the International Gandhi Award for his work in 1990. Wardekar died on 1 August 1996 at the age of 82.
