= Shambhu Dayal Sinvhal =

Indian mathematician and academic administrator (1923–2015)

- Born: 20 November 1923; Indore, Madhya Pradesh, India
- Died: 27 May 2015 (aged 91)
- Spouse: Laxmi Sinvhal
- Children: Son (Dr. Harsh Sinvhal); Daughters (Dr. Sudha Agarwal, Ms. Priyamvada Sinvhal-Sharma)
- Parent(s): B. D. Sinvhal; Tara Devi
- Awards: Padma Shri

Shambhu Dayal Sinvhal (20 November 1923 – 27 May 2015) was an Indian mathematician, astronomist and a former vice chancellor of Kumaon University. Born on 20 November 1923 at Indore in the largest Indian state of Madhya Pradesh to B. D. Sinvhal and Tara Devi, he started his career as a member of the faculty of the department of mathematics and astronomy at Lucknow University in 1946 where he worked till 1954. During this period, he secured a doctoral degree (PhD) in mathematics from Lucknow in 1951. In 1954, he resigned from the university to take up the post of an assistant astronomer at Uttar Pradesh State Observatory and became its director in 1960, a post he held till his superannuation 1978. He also worked as a professor at the University of Rourkee at the department of Earth Sciences. In 1978, he was appointed as the vice chancellor of Kumaon University.

Sinvhal was the president of Bharat Ganita Parishad and a member of International Astronomical Union, London. He served Astronomical Society of India as a member of its executive council (1973–74), as its vice president (1975–76), as its president (1977–79) and was its life member. He was a life member of the National Academy of Sciences, India and a member of the American Mathematical Society. He chaired the Uttar Pradesh Higher Education Service Commission set up by the state government and held memberships in the Instruments Society of India and the Optical Society of India. He was a fellow of the Royal Astronomical Society, London. The Government of India awarded him the fourth highest Indian civilian award of Padma Shri in 1975.

== See also ==
- Kumaon University
- Royal Astronomical Society
- Astronomical Society of India
- International Astronomical Union
