= Queenie H. C. Captain =

Indian social worker

- Born: India
- Occupation: Social worker
- Known for: Service for the blind
- Awards: Padma Shri

Queenie H. C. Captain was an Indian social worker known for her contributions to the welfare of the visually impaired people in India. She was the co-founder and the president of the National Association for the Blind, the largest non governmental organization for the blind people in India, from 1961 to 1972. She also served as the vice president and the chairperson of the finance raising committee of the organization. She was one of the organizers of the World Assembly of the World Council for the Welfare of the Blind held in New Delhi in 1969 and was the leader of the Indian delegation to the Quin-quennial Conference of the World Council for the Welfare of the Blind at Rome in 1959. The Government of India awarded her the fourth highest Indian civilian award of Padma Shri in 1974.

== See also ==
- World Council for the Welfare of the Blind
