= Vimal Kumar Chordia =

Indian politician (born 1924

Vimal Kumar Chordia (15 October 1924 – c. 2019) was an Indian politician who was a member of Rajya Sabha. He was a Member of Madhya Bharat Legislative Assembly from 1952 to 1957, and of the Madhya Pradesh Legislative Assembly from 1957 to 1962. Chordia served as vice-president of state unit of Bharatiya Jan Sangh and was member of Rajya Sabha from 1962 to 1968. Chordia's death was announced on 9 January 2019.
