= Ajit Chandra Chatterjee =

Indian civil servant (born 1923)

Ajit Chandra Chatterjee (born 1923) is an Indian civil servant who was awarded the Padma Shri in 1975.

== Life and career ==
Ajit Chandra Chatterjee was born in Lahore in 1923.

After a successful career in the Indian Railways (where he was a Divisional Superintendent in the Bhusawal and Bombay divisions of the Central Railway), he joined the public sector. He served with distinction as the Chairman & Managing Director of Mining and Allied Machinery Corporation (MAMC) in Durgapur, WB during 1970–77. He took over the company when it was slated to be shut down and lead its recovery to a profit making public enterprise. For his efforts in this revival, he was conferred the Padma Shri award by the government of India in 1975.

Chatterjee then served as the Chairman and Managing Director of the Heavy Engineering Corporation in Ranchi, Bihar, from 1977 to 1980. He also served as a member of the Standing Conference of Public Enterprises (SCOPE) and as a director in several other companies.

After his retirement from government service, he served as a director in the Peerless General Finance and Investments Ltd (PGFI) in the 1990s as well as in its subsidiary, Peerless Hotels Ltd.

== See also ==
- Padma Shri Awards (1970–1979)
