= Sulabha Panandikar =

Indian educator

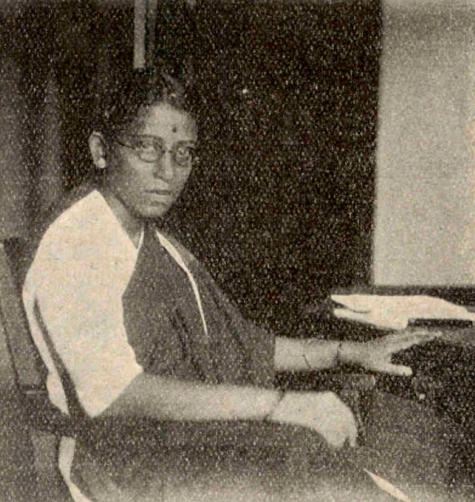
- Born: 9 April 1904 (age 122)
- Education: Bombay University (MA); Newnham College (PhD)
- Employer: Government of Bombay
- Awards: Padma Shri

Sulabha Gopal Panandikar (born 9 April 1904, date of death unknown) was an Indian educator.

== Early life and education ==
Panandikar was born on 9 April 1904.

In 1921, Panandikar became the first woman to win the Ellis Prize at the Matriculation examination and also the Jagannath Shankarshet Scholarship. She studied philosophy at Bombay University (now the University of Mumbai), graduating with a first class Masters degree and winning the Chancellor's medal. She attained her PhD from Newnham College at the University of Cambridge in England.

== Career ==
In India, Panandikar served as Director of Education of then Government of Bombay, Inspectress of Schools, Chairman of the National Council for Women's Education and as Member of the Central Revenue Board of Education.

In 1969, Panandikar published an article titled "Imbalances in the progress of girls and women's education: extent and remedy" in Education Quarterly.

Panandikar was honoured with the Padma Shri award.
