= Pessie Madan =

- Born: 26 September 1916; Rangoon, Burma, British India
- Died: 17 April 2015 (aged 98)
- Spouse: Shireen Madan
- Military career
- Allegiance: British India; India
- Branch: British Indian Army; Indian Army
- Service years: 1943–1968
- Rank: Brigadier
- Unit: Indian Army Corps of EME
- Awards: Padma Shri Award
- Other work: Manager of early corporate high-technology institutions in India

Pessie Madan (26 September 1916 – 17 April 2015) was a Brigadier of the Indian Army and an early leader in India’s high-technology research and development sector.

== Early life ==
Madan was born to a Parsi family in Rangoon, Burma (now Myanmar) on 26 September 1916. He and his family fled Burma just before its capture by the Japanese during World War II, returning to India on the heels of the retreating British Army.

== Education ==
Madan studied Chemistry at the University College Rangoon, earning a B.Sc. (Honours) in Chemistry followed by a Physics (Honours) degree. He was awarded the University's S. Ramanatha Reddiar Prize (Gold Medal) for highest standing in the Physics Honours Examination. Later, he completed a course in electronic engineering (wireless and radar) at Marconi College in Essex, U.K.

== Career ==
In 1943, Madan was commissioned into the British Indian Army, where he commanded a field unit in the turbulent Khyber-Pakhtunkhwa province. After the war, he continued as an officer of the Indian Army, serving in the Indian Army Corps of EME. He earned the rank of Brigadier before retiring, at the age of 52. In 1975 he received the Padma Shri for his services to the nation.

Upon retiring from the military, Madan began a career in India's rapidly growing high-technology sector, initially with the nation's premier defense electronics public sector company, Bharat Electronics Limited (BEL). While there, he planned and supervised the construction of BEL’s Radar and Communications factory at Ghaziabad, and became its first General Manager. He later planned and supervised construction of Gujarat Communications and Electronics Limited, a public sector electronics company of the state of Gujarat. He served as its Chairman and Managing Director for seven years, and remained Chairman for an additional five years.

In 1980, Madan joined the Tata Power Company, serving as an Advisor to what is now the largest private sector power utility company in India. In this capacity, he steered the company’s Mumbai-based Research and Development activities away from consumer electronics, toward the development of high-tech weapon systems for the Defence Ministry. To manufacture these new systems, he set up a Tata Power production unit capable of precision engineering in Electronic City, Bangalore. The unit, Tata Electronics Development Services, is now known as the Strategic Electronics Division. Madan served as an Advisor to Tata Power for seventeen years before finally retiring in 1997 at the age of 80 years.

After retirement, Madan turned to writing; in 2008, his autobiography "An Odyssey: My Reminiscences" was published by Konark Publishers.
