= J. M. Pahwa =

Indian ophthalmic surgeon

- Born: 4 July 1922; Multan, British India
- Died: 2001 (aged 78–79)
- Occupation: Ophthalmic surgeon
- Awards: Padma Shri; NAB Rustom Merwanji Alpaiwalla Memorial Award
- Website: www.jmpahwa.com

Jagdish Mitra Pahwa (1922-2001) was an Indian ophthalmologist, social worker and a specialist in Retinal Detachment and Photocoagulation who was reported to have conducted several charitable eye camps in India.

== Early life and education ==
Born on 4 July 1922 in Multan in the erstwhile British India (now in Pakistan), he graduated in medicine from the King Edward Medical University, Lahore.

== Awards ==
He was a 1969 elected fellow of the National Academy of Medical Sciences and a recipient of the NAB Rustom Merwanji Alpaiwalla Memorial Award from the National Association for the Blind (India) in 1944. The Government of India awarded him the fourth highest Indian civilian award of Padma Shri in 1973.
