= Pushkar Bhan =

Indian actor

Pushkar Bhan (1926 in Srinagar – 5 October 2008 in Delhi ) was an Indian radio actor and script writer from Kashmir, India.

== Literary career ==
He wrote three plays in collaboration with Som Nath Sadhu – Grand Rehearsal (1967), Chapath or Slap (1973) & Nev Nosh or New Bride (1975) & also played a central part in all three. He played the role of villain in first Kashmiri movie "Manzeraat" (1964) along with illustrious actors like Som Nath Sadhu.Other artists in Manzeraat were Omkar Nath Aima. Songs were sung by Raj Begum & Nirmala Chattoo (referred to as Nirmla).

== Media career ==
In 1952, Pushkar joined the All India Radio's Srinagar station as an artist & playwright, and retired as a senior producer in 1985. Bhan acted in Kashmiri films Manziraat (Mehndiraat) & Shayir-e-Kashmir Mehjoor. He has also acted with Bollywood actor Raj Kapoor. His Kashmiri serial Zoon Dab created media history as it was continuously aired every day for nineteen years.

== Awards ==
He was awarded the Padma Shri (1974) and the Sahitya Academy Award (1976) for Machamaa which is a collection of humorous plays.

== See also ==
- List of Sahitya Akademi Award winners for Kashmiri
