= Pandurang Dharmaji Jadhav =

Indian parliamentarian (1922–1987)

Pandurang Dharmaji Jadhav (1922–1987) was an Indian parliamentarian. He was a member of the Bombay Legislative Assembly (1952–57). He was awarded the Padma Shri in 1971 and was nominated as member of the Rajya Sabha from 1978 and served till 1984.

== Sources ==
- Brief Biodata
