= Dharamchand Chordia =

Indian politician (died 2021)

Dharamchand Chordia (1949/50 – 10 March 2021) was a leader of Bharatiya Janata Party from Maharashtra. He was a member of the Maharashtra Legislative Council. Chordia served as the general secretary of the state unit of the party.
