= Guruprasad Mohapatra =

Indian civil servant (1962–2021)

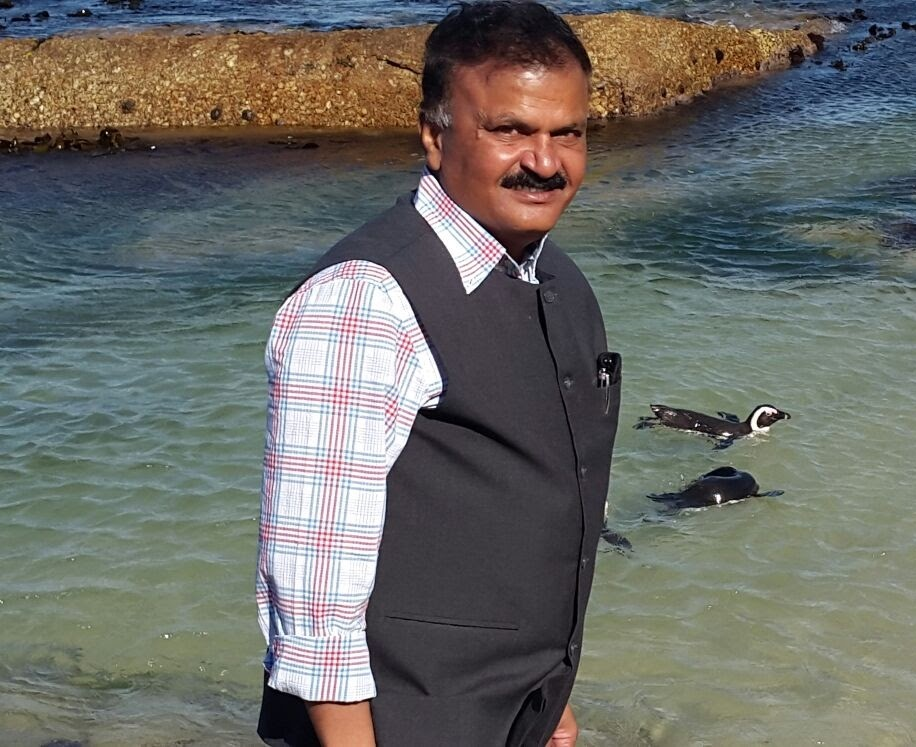
Guruprasad Mohapatra

Guruprasad Mohapatra (22 April 1962 – 19 June 2021) was an officer of the Indian Administrative Service (IAS) who had held several important positions in the Gujarat State Govt and also in the Central Govt of India. At the time of his demise in June 2021 due to COVID-19 he was holding the position of the Secretary of Department for Promotion of Industry and Internal Trade (DPIIT) in Govt of India.

In April 2021, in spite of the fact that he himself was suffering from Covid, he worked day and night to ensure availability of oxygen when the Covid pandemic was at its most dreadful and deaths from the disease were at their peak in the country. In the year 2022, Govt of India posthumously conferred the Padma Shri award on Mahapatra specifically for his immense contribution for the alleviation of the sufferings of Covid patients.

== Early life and education ==
Guruprasad Mohapatra was born on 22 April 1962 to Odisha Sahitya Akademi Award winner Mohapatra Nilamani Sahu and Prasanna Kumari Devi. He secured BA degree in history from Buxi Jagabandhu Bidyadhar College, Bhubaneswar and a master's degree in political science from Jawaharlal Nehru University (JNU). He also secured the M Phil degree in diplomacy from the School of International Studies at JNU. Later he also obtained an MBA degree from the Faculty of Economics, University of Ljubljana in Slovenia. The Maharaja Sayajirao University of Baroda awarded him the PhD degree for his thesis on "Management of Change : A Critical Evaluation of Power Sector Reforms and Restructuring of Gujarat Electricity Board".

== Career ==
Guruprasad Mohapatra joined the IAS in 1986 as an officer in the Gujarat cadre. His first appointment was as a sub-divisional magistrate in Gujarat’s Limbdi taluka in Surendranagar district. After his tenure as sub-divisional magistrate he was appointed as the District Development Officer of Surendranagar district. It was during his tenure the district became the first district of Gujarat to implement Integrated Wasteland Development Project of Government of India. He was later appointed as Collector of Junagadh district and Rajkot district.

After his service as Collector, Mohapatra served as Joint Managing Director of Gujarat Industrial Development Corporation and as Additional Sales Tax Commissioner. Then he took over as the Commissioner of Surat. While in this position he oversaw the implementation of many mega-projects including the constructions of the state’s then longest flyover, the state’s biggest auditorium Sardar Patel Auditorium, a new medical college and an ultra modern hospital. He had also worked as the Municipal Commissioner of Ahmedabad during which period the Kankaria Lakefront Project and the Sabarmati Riverfront Project took shape. The dossiers prepared under his supervision for submission to UNESCO played a key role in declaring Ahmedabad as the first World Heritage City of India in 2017.

Mohapatra had also held key administrative positions in several public sector undertakings in Gujarat like Member Administration of Gujarat Electricity Board, Chairman of Uttar Gujarat Vij Company Ltd, and Managing Director of Gujarat Alkalies and Chemicals Ltd.

At the all India level, he served as Joint Secretary in Department of Commerce, Chairman of Airport Authority of India and Secretary in Department for Promotion of Industry and Internal Trade, the position he held at the time of his death.

== Recognition: Padma Shri ==
- In the year 2022, Govt of India conferred the Padma Shri award, the third highest award in the Padma series of awards, posthumously on Guruprasad Mohapatra for his distinguished service in the field of civil service. The award is in recognition of his service as a "Senior Officer worked on oxygen availability during COVID-19 even from his hospital bed finally succumbing to the virus."

== Other prizes and recognitions ==
- Best DDO award of Gujarat State (1993)
- Second best collector award of Gujarat state (1996)
- Was felicitated as "Empathy Champion" in parliament by Lok Sabha Speaker in 2019 on the occasion of World Hepatitis Day
- Was awarded as "Unsung Hero" posthumously in the Healthgiri awards of India Today Group (2021)

== See also ==
- Padma Shri Award recipients in the year 2022
