= Badri Prasad Bajoria =

Indian social worker

- Born: 1925; Saharanpur, Uttar Pradesh, India
- Died: 1976 (aged 50–51)
- Occupations: Social worker, philanthropist
- Spouse: Savitri Devi
- Parent(s): Baldev Dass Bajoria; Kamla Devi
- Awards: Padma Shri

Badri Prasad Bajoria (1925–1976) was an Indian social worker, philanthropist, educationist and the founder of Shri Baldev Dass Bajoria Inter College, Kamala Devi Bajoria Degree College and Seth Baldev Dass Bajoria District Hospital. He was born in 1925 in Saharanpur in the Indian state of Uttar Pradesh to Kamla Devi and Baldev Dass Bajoria and was married to Savitri Devi. He was the co-founder of institutions such as Shrimati Kamla Devi Saraswati Shishu Mandir, Bajoria Sanatan Dharam Sankirtan Bhawan and Gandhi centenary Kamla Devi Bajoria Memorial Ganna Eye Hospital. He was honoured by the Government of India in 1972 with the Padma Shri, the fourth highest Indian civilian award.
