= Ramesh Inder Singh =

Indian Civil Servant

- Born: Punjab, India
- Occupation: Civil servant
- Awards: Padma Shri

Ramesh Inder Singh is a former Indian civil servant and the incumbent Chief Information Commissioner of the state of Punjab. He was the Deputy Commissioner of Amritsar during the Operation Blue Star, the military action at the Golden Temple in 1984 and has served as the Chief Secretary of Punjab. The Government of India awarded him the fourth highest Indian civilian honour of Padma Shri in 1986.

== Biography ==
Singh secured his master's degree in Political Science and a law degree from the University of Delhi to start his career as a member of faculty of political science at his alma mater. Later, he worked as a consultant with the World Bank before entering the Indian Administrative Service in 1974 from the West Bengal Cadre. he was joined to Punjab in July 1978 and posted as ADC Faridkot in August 1978. after he served as ADC sangrur and Director rural Development and Panchayat Raj. He was taken charge on 4 June 1984 from Sar Gurdev singh Brar as the Deputy Commissioner of Amritsar, and he held several posts such as Principal Secretary to Chief Minister of Punjab, Principal Secretary at the Department of Industries, Punjab, Managing Director of Punjab State Industrial Development Corporation and the Director General of Punjab Markfed. He also worked as the secretary with the Union Government at the Department of Labour and Employment and Department of Cooperation and headed the Employees' State Insurance Corporation.

In 2007, Singh was made the Chief Secretary of Punjab during the Prakash Singh Badal ministry. Before his superannuation on 30 September 2009, he was appointed as the Chief Information Commissioner of the state, a post he has been holding since then. He is recipient of the civilian honour of Padma Shri, which he received in 1986.

== See also ==
- Operation Blue Star
- Golden Temple
