= Ishrat Ali Siddiqui =

Indian poet and journalist (1919–2014)

- Born: 1919; Hardoi, India
- Died: 1 January 2014 (aged 94–95); Lucknow, Uttar Pradesh, India
- Occupations: Gandhian, writer, journalist
- Children: A son and a daughter
- Awards: Padma Shri

Ishrat Ali Siddiqui (1919-2014) was an Indian gandhian, poet of Urdu literature and a former editor of the Urdu daily, Quami Awaz. He was known for his protest against the press censorship imposed by the then prime minister of India, Indira Gandhi in the mid 1970s. The Government of India awarded him the fourth highest Indian civilian award of Padma Shri in 1974.

== Biography ==
Siddiqi will be remembered for the courage and conviction he displayed in advising Indira Gandhi against imposing Press censorship in 1975, though he was editing Indira Gandhi's daily the Quaumi Awaz in Lucknow, says Vikram Rao, noted journalist.

Ishrat Ali Siddiqui was born in 1919 in Hardoi, a small town on the banks of River Ganges in the Indian state of Uttar Pradesh. After completing his education in the state capital of Lucknow, he moved to Hyderabad where he worked as the editor of the Urdu daily, Payam, and Hindustan during which period his articles on nationalism earned him the wrath of the ruler of Hyderabad, Nizam Osman Ali.

Later, Siddiqui joined Sevagram of Mahatma Gandhi, and spent many years at the Ashram. He is known to have involved with the Indian freedom movement and at the time of the partition of India, he protested against it. After the Indian independence, he joined the Indian National Congress sponsored Quami Awaz, a sister publication of The National Herald in Urdu, as its editor. During the emergency period, he protested against the press censorship imposed by Indira Gandhi, then prime minister of India, while his colleagues maintained silence. In 1980, when Indira Gandhi returned to power after remaining out of office for three years (1977-1980) for her third term as the prime minister, Siddiqui was appointed as a member of the Second Press Commission. The commission, reportedly on Siddiqui's advice, submitted proposals for the modernization of Kitabat (Urdu calligraphy) and Urdu journalism. He also served the president of the Uttar Pradesh Working Journalists' Union and Uttar Pradesh Press Club and was a councilor of the Indian Federation of Working Journalists (IFWJ).

Siddiqui was awarded the civilian honour of Padma Shri in 1974. He died on the New Year day of 2014, at Balrampur hospital, where he had been admitted following a domestic accident occurred at his residence in Jamboorkhana. He is survived by his son and daughter, his wife preceding him in death.

== See also ==
- The Emergency (India)
- The National Herald
