= Mohanmullji Chordia =

Indian social worker

Mohanmull Chordia
- Born: 26 August 1902; Jodhpur, India
- Died: 5 February 1984 (aged 81)
- Spouse: Neni Kavur Bai
- Children: Five sons and three daughters
- Parent: Siremull Chordia/Sohanmull Chordia(adopted)
- Awards: Padma Shri; Rotary For The Sake of Honour Award

Mohanmull Chordia (26 August 1902 – 5 February 1984) was an Indian social worker, educationist, philanthropist, head of the Agurchand Manmull Bank and later Agurchand Manmull Pvt.Ltd (one of the oldest Marwari establishments in South India -established in 1847), the founder president of the Jain Society and the founder of Agurchand Manmull Jain College, Chennai, Tamil Nadu.

== Early life ==
He was born on 26 August 1902 in a Jain family at Nokha Chandawatan, Jodhpur state in the Indian state of Rajasthan to Siremull Chordia and did not get any formal education. In 1917, he was adopted by Udai Kavur Bai, the wife of Sohanmull Chordia (of The Agurchand Manmull Bank) His contributions were reported behind the establishment of several institutions such as Shri Shwethamber Sthankwasi Jain Educational Society, Shri Sthanakwasi Jain Pathsala, Shri Sohanmullji Chordia Charitable Dispensary, S. S Jain Boarding Home, A. G. Jain Higher Secondary School, Shri Jain Medical Relief Society and Neni Kavur Bai Maternity and Child Welfare Hospital, the last one in memory of his wife, Neni Kavur Bai.

He was the recipient of the fourth highest Indian civilian award, the Padma Shri, from the Government of India, which he received in 1972. The Rotary International of Chennai awarded him the For The Sake of Honour in 1982 and the A. M. Jain College, conducts an annual cricket tournament, Padmashri Shri. Mohanmullji Chordia Gold Cup T20 tournament, for the colleges in Chennai. Mohanmullji Chordia died in 1983 at the age of 81, leaving behind five sons and three daughters.
