= Jamshed Vazifdar =

Indian physician

- Born: Mumbai, Maharashtra, India
- Died: 2000
- Other name: Jimmy
- Occupation: Physician
- Known for: Blood transfusion movement
- Parent: Nowroji Vazifdar
- Awards: Padma Shri

Jamshed Nowroji Vazifdar, popularly known as Jimmy, was a Parsi physician from India and a former secretary of the Indian Red Cross Society at its Maharashtra Chapter. Born in Mumbai and graduated in medicine in 1946, he is known to have contributed to the blood transfusion movement in India. The Government of India awarded him the fourth highest Indian civilian award of Padma Shri in 1973. He died in 2000.
