= Som Nath Sadhu =

Indian actor, playwright and director

- Born: 1935; Srinagar, India
- Died: 1982 (aged 46–47); New Delhi
- Occupations: Playwright, theatre personality
- Known for: Kashmiri theatre
- Parent: Prem Nath Pardesi
- Awards: Padma Shri

Som Nath Sadhu (1935–1982) was an Indian theatre personality known for his contributions to Kashmiri theatre as an actor, playwright and director.

He was born in 1935 in Srinagar into a Kashmiri Pandit family to the notable playwright, Prem Nath Pardase, and started his career by joining Radio Kashmir in 1955. There he had the opportunity to work with another Kashmiri playwright, Pushkar Bhan, with whom he co-wrote several plays for the radio. Janaki, Lwakutboy (Younger Brother), Zi rang (Two Colours), Shama dan (Candlestick), Avihin (Vortex) and Shararat (Mischief) are among his notable works. He also acted in two Kashmiri films, Shayar-e-Kashmir Mahjoor and Mainz Raat.

The Government of India awarded him the fourth highest Indian civilian award of Padma Shri in 1974. He died in 1982 at the age of 47.
