= List of Padma Vibhushan award recipients =

Padma Vibhushan
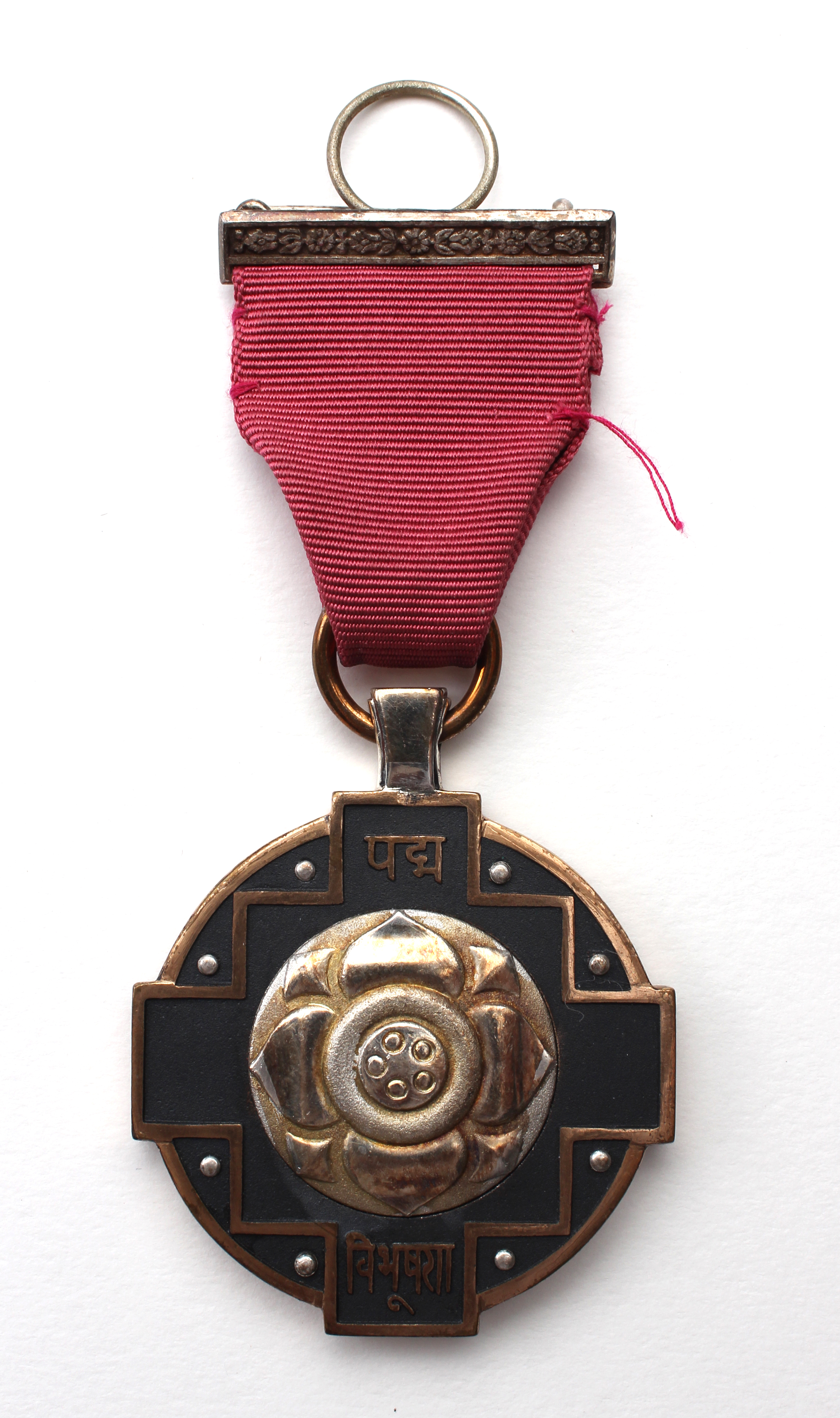
- Padma Vibhushan medal attached with a pink ribbon
- Type: National Civilian
- Country: India
- Presented by: Government of India
- Ribbon
- Obverse: A centrally located lotus flower is embossed and the text "Padma" written in Devanagari script is placed above and the text "Vibhushan" is placed below the lotus.
- Reverse: A platinum Emblem of India placed in the centre with the national motto of India, "Satyameva Jayate" (Truth alone triumphs) in Devanagari Script
- Established: 1954
- First award: 1954: Satyendra Nath Bose; Nandalal Bose; Zakir Husain; Balasaheb Gangadhar Kher; V. K. Krishna Menon; Jigme Dorji Wangchuck
- Final award: 2026: Dharmendra (posthumous); K. T. Thomas; N. Rajam; P. Narayanan; V. S. Achuthanandan (posthumous)

Highlights
- Total: 348

Precedence
- Next (higher): Bharat Ratna

- Next (lower): Padma Bhushan

The Padma Vibhushan is the second highest civilian award of the Republic of India. Instituted on 2 January 1954, the award is given for the "exceptional and distinguished service", without distinction of race, occupation, position, or sex. The Padma Vibhushan award recipients are announced every year on Republic Day and registered in The Gazette of India—a publication released weekly by the Department of Publication, Ministry of Urban Development used for official government notices. The conferral of the award is not considered official without its publication in the Gazette. Recipients whose awards have been revoked or restored, both of which require the authority of the President, are also registered in the Gazette and are required to surrender their medals when their names are struck from the register. As of 2020, none of the conferments of Padma Vibhushan have been revoked or restored. The recommendations are received from all the state and the union territory governments, the Ministries of the Government, the Bharat Ratna and previous Padma Vibhushan award recipients, the Institutes of Excellence, the Ministers, the Chief Ministers and the Governors of State, and the Members of Parliament including private individuals. The recommendations received during 1 May and 15 September of every year are submitted to the Padma Awards Committee, constituted by the Prime Minister. The committee recommendations are later submitted to the Prime Minister and the President for the further approval.

When instituted in 1954, the Padma Vibhushan was classified as "Pahla Varg" (Class I) under the three-tier Padma Vibhushan awards; preceded by the Bharat Ratna, the highest civilian award, and followed by "Dusra Varg" (Class II), and "Tisra Varg" (Class III). On 15 January 1955, the Padma Vibhushan was reclassified into three different awards; the Padma Vibhushan, the highest of the three, followed by the Padma Bhushan and the Padma Shri. The criteria includes "exceptional and distinguished service in any field including service rendered by Government servants" but excluding those working with the Public sector undertakings with the exception of doctors and scientists. The 1954 statutes did not allow posthumous awards but this was subsequently modified in the January 1955 statute. The award, along with other personal civil honours, was briefly suspended twice in its history; for the first time in July 1977 when Morarji Desai was sworn in as the fourth Prime Minister. The suspension was rescinded on 25 January 1980, after Indira Gandhi became the Prime Minister. The civilian awards were suspended again in mid-1992, when two Public-Interest Litigations were filed in the High Courts questioning the civilian awards being "Titles" per an interpretation of Article 18 (1) of the Constitution. (Note: Per Article 18 (1) of the Constitution of India: Abolition of titles, "no title, not being a military or academic distinction, shall be conferred by the State".) The awards were reintroduced by the Supreme Court in December 1995, following the conclusion of the litigation.

The recipients receive a Sanad (certificate) signed by the President and a medal with no monetary grant associated with the award. The decoration is a circular-shaped toned bronze medallion 1 3/4 inches (44 mm) in diameter and 1/8 inch (3.2 mm) thick. The centrally placed pattern made of outer lines of a square of 1 3/16 inches (30 mm) side is embossed with a knob embossed within each of the outer angles of the pattern. A raised circular space of diameter 1 1/16 inches (27 mm) is placed at the centre of the decoration. A centrally located lotus flower is embossed on the obverse side of the medal and the text "Padma" written in Devanagari script is placed above and the text "Vibhushan" is placed below the lotus. The Emblem of India is placed in the centre of the reverse side with the national motto, "Satyameva Jayate" (Truth alone triumphs) in Devanagari Script, inscribed on the lower edge. The rim, the edges and all embossing on either side is of white gold with the text "Padma Vibhushan" of silver gilt. The medal is suspended by a pink riband 1 1/4 inches (32 mm) in width. It is ranked fourth in the order of precedence of wearing of medals and decorations.

The first recipients of the Padma Vibhushan were Satyendra Nath Bose, Nandalal Bose, Zakir Husain, Balasaheb Gangadhar Kher, V. K. Krishna Menon, and Jigme Dorji Wangchuck, who were honoured in 1954. As of 2026, the award has been bestowed on 348 individuals, including thirty-four posthumous and twenty-five non-citizen recipients. Some of the recipients have refused or returned their awards; P. N. Haksar, (Note: P. N. Haksar was offered the award in 1973 for, among other services, his crucial diplomatic role in brokering the Indo-Soviet Treaty of Friendship and Cooperation and the Shimla Agreement, but declined as "Accepting an award for work done somehow causes an inexplicable discomfort to me.") Vilayat Khan, (Note: Vilayat Khan refused Padma Shri (1964), Padma Bhushan (1968), and Padma Vibhushan (2000) and stated that "the selection committees were incompetent to judge [his] music".) E. M. S. Namboodiripad, (Note: E. M. S. Namboodiripad, the General Secretary of the Communist Party of India (of the Communist Party of India (Marxist) from 1964) and the first Chief Minister of Kerala (1957-59, 1967-69), declined the award in 1992, as it went against his nature to accept a state honour.) Swami Ranganathananda, (Note: Swami Ranganathananda declined the award in 2000 as it was conferred to him as an individual and not to the Ramakrishna Mission.) and Manikonda Chalapathi Rau refused the award; the family members of Lakshmi Chand Jain (2011) and Sharad Anantrao Joshi (2016) declined their posthumous conferments, (Note: Lakshmi Chand Jain died on 14 November 2010, at the age of 84. His family refused to accept the posthumous honour as Jain was against accepting state honours.) (Note: Sharad Anantrao Joshi's family refused to accept the posthumous honour as Joshi's work for good of farmers is not reflected in the Government policies for them.) and 1986 recipient Baba Amte and 2015 recipient Parkash Singh Badal returned theirs honour in 1991 and 2020 respectively. (Note: In 1991, Baba Amte returned the award, along with the Padma Shri conferred in 1971, to protest against the treatment given to the tribals during the construction of Sardar Sarovar Dam.) (Note: In 2020, Parkash Singh Badal returned the award in solidarity with the farmers protest.) The 2026 award was bestowed upon five recipients – Dharmendra (posthumous), K. T. Thomas, N. Rajam, P. Narayanan, and V. S. Achuthanandan (posthumous).

== Overview ==
Award recipients by decade
Year	Number of recipients
1954–1959	17
1960–1969	27
1970–1979	53
1980–1989	20
1990–1999	42
2000–2009	86
2010–2019	62
2020–2029	31

Award recipients by field
Field	Number of recipients
Arts	67
Civil Service	53
Literature and Education	43
Medicine	16
Others	8
Public Affairs	79
Science and Engineering	37
Social Work	18
Sports	4
Trade and Industry	13

== Recipients ==
Key
+ Naturalised citizen recipient	* Non-citizen recipient	# Posthumous recipient

Year	Image	Laureates	Field	State / country
1954		Satyendra Nath Bose	Science and Engineering	West Bengal
1954		Nandalal Bose	Arts	West Bengal
1954		Zakir Husain	Public Affairs	Andhra Pradesh
1954		B. G. Kher	Public Affairs	Maharashtra
1954		V. K. Krishna Menon	Public Affairs	Kerala
1954		Jigme Dorji Wangchuck*	Public Affairs	Bhutan
1955		Dhondo Keshav Karve	Literature and Education	Maharashtra
1955		J. R. D. Tata	Trade and Industry	Maharashtra
1956		Fazl Ali	Public Affairs	Bihar
1956		Janaki Devi Bajaj	Social Work	Madhya Pradesh
1956		Chandulal Madhavlal Trivedi	Public Affairs	Madhya Pradesh
1957		Ghanashyam Das Birla	Trade and Industry	Rajasthan
1957		Sri Prakasa	Public Affairs	Uttar Pradesh
1957		M. C. Setalvad	Public Affairs	Maharashtra
1958	No awards			
1959		John Matthai	Literature and Education	Kerala
1959		Gaganvihari Lallubhai Mehta	Social Work	Maharashtra
1959		Radhabinod Pal	Public Affairs	West Bengal
1960		Narayana Raghvan Pillai	Public Affairs	Tamil Nadu
1961	No awards			
1962		H. V. R. Iyengar	Civil Service	Tamil Nadu
1962		Padmaja Naidu	Public Affairs	Andhra Pradesh
1962		Vijaya Lakshmi Pandit	Civil Service	Uttar Pradesh
1963		Suniti Kumar Chatterji	Literature and Education	West Bengal
1963		A. Lakshmanaswami Mudaliar	Medicine	Tamil Nadu
1963		Hari Vinayak Pataskar	Public Affairs	Maharashtra
1964		Acharya Kakasaheb Kalelkar	Literature and Education	Maharashtra
1964		Gopinath Kaviraj	Literature and Education	Uttar Pradesh
1965		Jayanto Nath Chaudhuri	Civil Service	West Bengal
1965		Mehdi Nawaz Jung	Public Affairs	Telangana
1965		Arjan Singh	Civil Service	Delhi
1966		Valerian Gracias	Social Work	Maharashtra
1967		C. K. Daphtary	Public Affairs	Maharashtra
1967		Hafiz Mohamad Ibrahim	Civil Service	Andhra Pradesh
1967		Bhola Nath Jha	Civil Service	Uttar Pradesh
1967		P. V. R. Rao	Civil Service	Andhra Pradesh
1968		Madhav Shrihari Aney	Public Affairs	Madhya Pradesh
1968		Subrahmanyan Chandrasekhar*	Science and Engineering	United States
1968		Prasanta Chandra Mahalanobis	Literature and Education	Delhi
1968		Kirpal Singh	Civil Service	Delhi
1968		Kalyan Sundaram	Public Affairs	Delhi
1969		Rajeshwar Dayal	Civil Service	Delhi
1969		Dattatraya Shridhar Joshi	Civil Service	Maharashtra
1969		Har Gobind Khorana*	Literature and Education	United States
1969		Mohan Sinha Mehta	Civil Service	Rajasthan
1969		Ghananand Pande	Civil Service	Uttar Pradesh
1970		Tara Chand	Literature and Education	Uttar Pradesh
1970		Suranjan Das# (Note: Suranjan Das died on 10 January 1970, at the age of 49.)	Civil Service	West Bengal
1970		Anthony Lancelot Dias	Public Affairs	Maharashtra
1970		Paramasiva Prabhakar Kumaramangalam	Civil Service	Tamil Nadu
1970		A. Ramasamy Mudaliar	Civil Service	Andhra Pradesh
1970		Binay Ranjan Sen	Civil Service	West Bengal
1970		Harbaksh Singh	Civil Service	Punjab
1971		Bimala Prasad Chaliha	Civil Service	Assam
1971		Allauddin Khan	Arts	West Bengal
1971		Sumati Morarjee	Civil Service	Maharashtra
1971		Uday Shankar	Arts	Maharashtra
1971		Vithal Nagesh Shirodkar	Medicine	Goa
1971		B. Sivaraman	Civil Service	Tamil Nadu
1972		P. B. Gajendragadkar	Civil Service	Maharashtra
1972		Aditya Nath Jha#	Civil Service	Uttar Pradesh
1972		Pratap Chandra Lal	Civil Service	Punjab
1972		Sam Manekshaw	Civil Service	Tamil Nadu
1972		Jivraj Narayan Mehta	Public Affairs	Maharashtra
1972		Sardarilal Mathradas Nanda	Civil Service	Delhi
1972		Ghulam Mohammed Sadiq# (Note: Ghulam Mohammed Sadiq died on 12 December 1971, at the age of 59.)	Public Affairs	Jammu and Kashmir
1972		Vikram Sarabhai# (Note: Vikram Sarabhai died on 30 December 1971, at the age of 52.)	Science and Engineering	Gujarat
1972		Hormasji Maneckji Seervai	Literature and Education	Maharashtra
1973		Basanti Devi	Civil Service	West Bengal
1973		U. N. Dhebar	Social Work	Gujarat
1973		Daulat Singh Kothari	Science and Engineering	Delhi
1973		Nellie Sengupta	Social Work	West Bengal
1973		Nagendra Singh	Public Affairs	Rajasthan
1973		Thirumalraya Swaminathan	Civil Service	Tamil Nadu
1974		Niren De	Public Affairs	West Bengal
1974		Benode Behari Mukherjee	Arts	West Bengal
1974		V. K. R. V. Rao	Civil Service	Karnataka
1974		Harish Chandra Sarin	Civil Service	Delhi
1975		C. D. Deshmukh	Public Affairs	Maharashtra
1975		Durgabai Deshmukh	Social Work	Andhra Pradesh
1975		Mary Clubwala Jadhav	Social Work	Tamil Nadu
1975		Basanti Dulal Nagchaudhuri	Literature and Education	West Bengal
1975		Raja Ramanna	Science and Engineering	Karnataka
1975		Homi Nusserwanji Sethna	Civil Service	Maharashtra
1975		M. S. Subbulakshmi	Arts	Tamil Nadu
1975		Premlila Vithaldas Thackersey	Literature and Education	Maharashtra
1976		Salim Ali	Science and Engineering	Uttar Pradesh
1976		Gurmukh Singh Musafir# (Note: Gurmukh Singh Musafir died on 18 January 1976, at the age of 77.)	Literature and Education	Punjab
1976		K. Shankar Pillai	Arts	Delhi
1976		K. R. Ramanathan	Science and Engineering	Kerala
1976		Satyajit Ray	Arts	West Bengal
1976		K. L. Shrimali	Literature and Education	Uttar Pradesh
1976		Bashir Hussain Zaidi	Literature and Education	Delhi
1977		T. Balasaraswati	Arts	Tamil Nadu
1977		Ali Yavar Jung# (Note: Ali Yavar Jung died on 11 December 1976, at the age of 70.)	Public Affairs	Andhra Pradesh
1977		Ajudhia Nath Khosla	Civil Service	Delhi
1977		Om Prakash Mehra	Civil Service	Punjab
1977		Ajoy Kumar Mukherjee	Public Affairs	West Bengal
1977		Chandeshwar Prasad Narayan Singh	Literature and Education	Delhi
1978	Awards suspended			
1979	Awards suspended			
1980		Bismillah Khan	Arts	Uttar Pradesh
1980		Rai Krishnadasa	Civil Service	Uttar Pradesh
1981		Satish Dhawan	Science and Engineering	Karnataka
1981		Ravi Shankar	Arts	Uttar Pradesh
1982		Mirabehn	Social Work	United Kingdom
1983	No awards			
1984	No awards			
1985		C. N. R. Rao	Science and Engineering	Karnataka
1985		M. G. K. Menon	Science and Engineering	Kerala
1986		Baba Amte	Social Work	Maharashtra
1986		Birju Maharaj	Arts	Delhi
1986		Autar Singh Paintal	Medicine	Delhi
1987		Kamaladevi Chattopadhyay	Social Work	Karnataka
1987		Benjamin Peary Pal	Science and Engineering	Punjab
1987		Manmohan Singh	Civil Service	Delhi
1987		Arun Shridhar Vaidya# (Note: Arun Shridhar Vaidya was assassinated by Sikh extremists on 10 August 1986.)	Civil Service	Maharashtra
1988		Mirza Hameedullah Beg	Public Affairs	Delhi
1988		Kuvempu	Literature and Education	Karnataka
1988		Mahadevi Varma# (Note: Mahadevi Varma died on 11 September 1987, at the age of 80.)	Literature and Education	Uttar Pradesh
1989		Uma Shankar Dikshit	Public Affairs	Uttar Pradesh
1989		Ali Akbar Khan	Arts	West Bengal
1989		M. S. Swaminathan	Science and Engineering	Tamil Nadu
1990		V. S. R. Arunachalam	Literature and Education	Delhi
1990		Triloki Nath Chaturvedi	Civil Service	Karnataka
1990		Bhabatosh Datta	Literature and Education	West Bengal
1990		Kumar Gandharva	Arts	Madhya Pradesh
1990		A. P. J. Abdul Kalam	Science and Engineering	Tamil Nadu
1991		Semmangudi Srinivasa Iyer	Arts	Tamil Nadu
1991		M. Balamuralikrishna	Arts	Tamil Nadu
1991		M. F. Husain	Arts	Maharashtra
1991		Hirendranath Mukherjee	Public Affairs	West Bengal
1991		Gulzarilal Nanda	Public Affairs	Gujarat
1991		I. G. Patel	Science and Engineering	Gujarat
1991		N. G. Ranga	Public Affairs	Andhra Pradesh
1991		Khusro Faramurz Rustamji	Civil Service	Maharashtra
1991		Rajaram Shastri	Literature and Education	Uttar Pradesh
1992		Aruna Asaf Ali	Social Work	Delhi
1992		Lakshman Shastri Joshi	Literature and Education	Maharashtra
1992		Mallikarjun Mansur	Arts	Karnataka
1992		S. I. Padmavati	Medicine	Delhi
1992		Kaloji Narayana Rao	Arts	Telangana
1992		Ravi Narayana Reddy# (Note: Ravi Narayana Reddy died on 9 September 1991, at the age of 83.)	Public Affairs	Andhra Pradesh
1992		V. Shantaram# (Note: V. Shantaram died on 30 October 1990, at the age of 88.)	Arts	Maharashtra
1992		Govindbhai Shroff	Literature and Education	Maharashtra
1992		Swaran Singh	Public Affairs	Punjab
1992		Atal Bihari Vajpayee	Public Affairs	Delhi
1993	Awards suspended			
1994	Awards suspended			
1995	Awards suspended			
1996	Awards suspended			
1997	Awards suspended			
1998		Usha Mehta	Social Work	Maharashtra
1998		Nanabhoy Palkhivala	Public Affairs	Maharashtra
1998		Lakshmi Sahgal	Public Affairs	Uttar Pradesh
1998		Walter Sisulu*	Public Affairs	South Africa
1999		Pandurang Shastri Athavale	Social Work	Maharashtra
1999		Rajagopala Chidambaram	Science and Engineering	Maharashtra
1999		Nanaji Deshmukh	Social Work	Delhi
1999		Sarvepalli Gopal	Literature and Education	Tamil Nadu
1999		Satish Gujral	Arts	Delhi
1999		V. R. Krishna Iyer	Public Affairs	Kerala
1999		Bhimsen Joshi	Arts	Maharashtra
1999		Hans Raj Khanna	Public Affairs	Delhi
1999		Verghese Kurien	Science and Engineering	Gujarat
1999		Lata Mangeshkar	Arts	Maharashtra
1999		Braj Kumar Nehru	Civil Service	Himachal Pradesh
1999		D. K. Pattammal	Arts	Tamil Nadu
1999		Lallan Prasad Singh# (Note: Lallan Prasad Singh died on 9 November 1998, at the age of 86.)	Civil Service	Delhi
1999		Dharma Vira	Civil Service	Delhi
2000		Sikander Bakht	Public Affairs	Delhi
2000		Jagdish Bhagwati*	Literature and Education	United States
2000		Hariprasad Chaurasia	Arts	Maharashtra
2000		M. S. Gill	Civil Service	Delhi
2000		Krishnaswamy Kasturirangan	Science and Engineering	Karnataka
2000		K. B. Lall	Civil Service	Delhi
2000		Kelucharan Mohapatra	Arts	Odisha
2000		Jasraj Motiram	Arts	Maharashtra
2000		M. Narasimham	Trade and Industry	Andhra Pradesh
2000		R. K. Narayan	Literature and Education	Tamil Nadu
2000		Bhairab Dutt Pande	Civil Service	Uttar Pradesh
2000		K. N. Raj	Literature and Education	Kerala
2000		Tarlok Singh	Civil Service	Delhi
2001		John Kenneth Galbraith*	Literature and Education	United States
2001		Benjamin Gilman*	Public Affairs	United States
2001		Amjad Ali Khan	Arts	Delhi
2001		Zubin Mehta*	Arts	United States
2001		Hrishikesh Mukherjee	Arts	Maharashtra
2001		K. Satchidananda Murty	Literature and Education	Andhra Pradesh
2001		Chakravarthi V. Narasimhan	Civil Service	Tamil Nadu
2001		Hosei Norota*	Public Affairs	Japan
2001		C. R. Rao*	Science and Engineering	United States
2001		Man Mohan Sharma	Science and Engineering	Maharashtra
2001		Shivkumar Sharma	Arts	Maharashtra
2002		Kishori Amonkar	Arts	Maharashtra
2002		Gangubai Hangal	Arts	Karnataka
2002		Kishan Maharaj	Arts	Uttar Pradesh
2002		C. Rangarajan	Literature and Education	Tamil Nadu
2002		Soli Sorabjee	Public Affairs	Delhi
2003		Kazi Lhendup Dorjee	Public Affairs	West Bengal
2003		Sonal Mansingh	Arts	Delhi
2003		Bal Ram Nanda	Literature and Education	Delhi
2003		Brihaspati Dev Triguna	Medicine	Delhi
2004		Jayant Narlikar	Science and Engineering	Maharashtra
2004		Amrita Pritam	Literature and Education	Delhi
2004		M. N. Venkatachaliah	Public Affairs	Karnataka
2005		Milon K. Banerji	Public Affairs	Delhi
2005		Mohan Dharia	Social Work	Maharashtra
2005		Jyotindra Nath Dixit# (Note: Jyotindra Nath Dixit died on 3 January 2005, at the age of 68.)	Civil Service	Delhi
2005		B. K. Goyal	Medicine	Maharashtra
2005		R. K. Laxman	Arts	Maharashtra
2005		Ram Narayan	Arts	Maharashtra
2005		Karan Singh	Public Affairs	Delhi
2005		M. S. Valiathan	Medicine	Delhi
2006		Norman Borlaug*	Science and Engineering	United States
2006		Charles Correa	Science and Engineering	Maharashtra
2006		Nirmala Deshpande	Social Work	Delhi
2006		Mahasweta Devi	Literature and Education	West Bengal
2006		Adoor Gopalakrishnan	Arts	Kerala
2006		V. N. Khare	Public Affairs	Uttar Pradesh
2006		C. R. Krishnaswamy Rao	Civil Service	Tamil Nadu
2006		Obaid Siddiqi	Science and Engineering	Karnataka
2006		Prakash Narain Tandon	Medicine	Delhi
2007		P. N. Bhagwati	Public Affairs	Delhi
2007		Naresh Chandra	Civil Service	Delhi
2007		Raja Chelliah	Public Affairs	Tamil Nadu
2007		V. Krishnamurthy	Civil Service	Delhi
2007		Fali Sam Nariman	Public Affairs	Delhi
2007		Raja Rao*# (Note: Raja Rao died on 8 July 2006, at the age of 97.)	Literature and Education	United States
2007		Balu Sankaran	Medicine	Delhi
2007		Khushwant Singh	Literature and Education	Delhi
2007		E. C. George Sudarshan*	Science and Engineering	United States
2007		Narinder Nath Vohra	Civil Service	Haryana
2008		Adarsh Sein Anand	Public Affairs	Uttar Pradesh
2008		Viswanathan Anand	Sports	Tamil Nadu
2008		Asha Bhosle	Arts	Maharashtra
2008		P. N. Dhar	Public Affairs	Delhi
2008		Edmund Hillary*# (Note: Edmund Hillary died on 11 January 2008, at the age of 88.)	Sports	New Zealand
2008		Lakshmi Mittal*	Trade and Industry	United Kingdom
2008		Pranab Mukherjee	Public Affairs	Delhi
2008		N. R. Narayana Murthy	Trade and Industry	Karnataka
2008		Prithvi Raj Singh Oberoi	Trade and Industry	Delhi
2008		Rajendra K. Pachauri	Science and Engineering	Delhi
2008		E. Sreedharan	Science and Engineering	Delhi
2008		Ratan Tata	Trade and Industry	Maharashtra
2008		Sachin Tendulkar	Sports	Maharashtra
2009		Sunderlal Bahuguna	Social Work	Uttarakhand
2009		Jasbir Singh Bajaj	Medicine	Punjab
2009		D. P. Chattopadhyaya	Literature and Education	West Bengal
2009		Ashok Sekhar Ganguly	Trade and Industry	Maharashtra
2009		Nirmala Joshi	Social Work	West Bengal
2009		Anil Kakodkar	Science and Engineering	Maharashtra
2009		Purshotam Lal	Medicine	Uttar Pradesh
2009		G. Madhavan Nair	Science and Engineering	Karnataka
2009		Govind Narain	Public Affairs	Uttar Pradesh
2009		Chandrika Prasad Srivastava	Civil Service	Maharashtra
2010		Ebrahim Alkazi	Arts	Delhi
2010		Venkatraman Ramakrishnan*	Science and Engineering	United Kingdom
2010		Prathap C. Reddy	Trade and Industry	Andhra Pradesh
2010		Y. Venugopal Reddy	Public Affairs	Andhra Pradesh
2010		Zohra Sehgal	Arts	Delhi
2010		Umayalpuram K. Sivaraman	Arts	Tamil Nadu
2011		Montek Singh Ahluwalia	Public Affairs	Delhi
2011		Vijay Kelkar	Public Affairs	Maharashtra
2011		Akhlaqur Rahman Kidwai	Public Affairs	Delhi
2011		O. N. V. Kurup	Literature and Education	Kerala
2011		Sitakant Mahapatra	Literature and Education	Odisha
2011		Brajesh Mishra	Civil Service	Delhi
2011		K. Parasaran	Public Affairs	Delhi
2011		Azim Premji	Trade and Industry	Karnataka
2011		Palle Rama Rao	Science and Engineering	Andhra Pradesh
2011		Akkineni Nageswara Rao	Arts	Andhra Pradesh
2011		Kapila Vatsyayan	Arts	Delhi
2011		Homai Vyarawalla	Arts	Gujarat
2012		Bhupen Hazarika# (Note: Bhupen Hazarika died on 5 November 2011, at the age of 85.)	Arts	Assam
2012		Mario Miranda# (Note: Mario Miranda died on 11 December 2011, at the age of 85.)	Arts	Goa
2012		T. V. Rajeswar	Civil Service	Delhi
2012		Kantilal Hastimal Sancheti	Medicine	Maharashtra
2012		K. G. Subramanyan	Arts	Gujarat
2013		Raghunath Mohapatra	Arts	Odisha
2013		Roddam Narasimha	Science and Engineering	Karnataka
2013		Yash Pal	Science and Engineering	Uttar Pradesh
2013		S. H. Raza	Arts	Delhi
2014		B. K. S. Iyengar	Others	Maharashtra
2014		Raghunath Anant Mashelkar	Science and Engineering	Maharashtra
2015		L. K. Advani	Public Affairs	Gujarat
2015		Amitabh Bachchan	Arts	Maharashtra
2015		Parkash Singh Badal	Public Affairs	Punjab
2015		Veerendra Heggade	Social Work	Karnataka
2015		Dilip Kumar	Arts	Maharashtra
2015		Jagadguru Swami Rambhadracharya	Literature and Education	Uttar Pradesh
2015		M. R. Srinivasan	Science and Engineering	Tamil Nadu
2015		Kottayan Katankot Venugopal	Public Affairs	Delhi
2015		Prince Karim Al Hussaini Aga Khan*	Social Work	United Kingdom/France
2016		V. K. Aatre	Science and Engineering	Karnataka
2016		Dhirubhai Ambani# (Note: Dhirubhai Ambani died on 6 July 2002, at the age of 69.)	Trade and Industry	Maharashtra
2016		Girija Devi	Arts	West Bengal
2016		Avinash Dixit*	Literature and Education	United States
2016		Jagmohan	Public Affairs	Delhi
2016		Yamini Krishnamurthy	Arts	Delhi
2016		Rajinikanth	Arts	Tamil Nadu
2016		Ramoji Rao	Literature and Education	Andhra Pradesh
2016		Sri Sri Ravi Shankar	Others	Karnataka
2016		V. Shanta	Medicine	Tamil Nadu
2017		Murli Manohar Joshi	Public Affairs	Uttar Pradesh
2017		Sunder Lal Patwa# (Note: Sunder Lal Patwa died on 28 December 2016, at the age of 92.)	Public Affairs	Madhya Pradesh
2017		Sharad Pawar	Public Affairs	Maharashtra
2017		Udupi Ramachandra Rao	Science and Engineering	Karnataka
2017		P. A. Sangma# (Note: P. A. Sangma died on 4 March 2016, at the age of 68.)	Public Affairs	Meghalaya
2017		Jaggi Vasudev	Others	Tamil Nadu
2017		K. J. Yesudas	Arts	Kerala
2018		Ilaiyaraja	Arts	Tamil Nadu
2018		Ghulam Mustafa Khan	Arts	Maharashtra
2018		P. Parameswaran	Literature and Education	Kerala
2019		Teejan Bai	Arts	Chhattisgarh
2019		Ismaïl Omar Guelleh*	Public Affairs	Djibouti
2019		Anil Manibhai Naik	Trade and Industry	Maharashtra
2019		Balwant Moreshwar Purandare	Arts	Maharashtra
2020		George Fernandes# (Note: George Fernandes died on 29 January 2019, at the age of 88.)	Public Affairs	Karnataka
2020		Arun Jaitley# (Note: Arun Jaitley died on 24 August 2019, at the age of 66.)	Public Affairs	Delhi
2020		Anerood Jugnauth*	Public Affairs	Mauritius
2020		M. C. Mary Kom	Sports	Manipur
2020		Chhannulal Mishra	Arts	Uttar Pradesh
2020		Sushma Swaraj# (Note: Sushma Swaraj died on 6 August 2019, at the age of 67.)	Public Affairs	Delhi
2020		Vishwesha Tirtha# (Note: Vishwesha Tirtha died on 29 December 2019, at the age of 88.)	Others	Karnataka
2021		Shinzo Abe*	Public Affairs	Japan
2021		S. P. Balasubrahmanyam# (Note: S. P. Balasubrahmanyam died on 25 September 2020, at the age of 74.)	Arts	Andhra Pradesh
2021		Belle Monappa Hegde	Medicine	Karnataka
2021		Narinder Singh Kapany*# (Note: Narinder Singh Kapany died on 4 December 2020, at the age of 94.)	Science and Engineering	United States
2021		Wahiduddin Khan	Others	Delhi
2021		B. B. Lal	Others	Delhi
2021		Sudarshan Sahoo	Arts	Odisha
2022		Prabha Atre	Arts	Maharashtra
2022		Radheshyam Khemka# (Note: Radheshyam Khemka died on 4 April 2021, at the age of 86.)	Literature and Education	Uttar Pradesh
2022		Bipin Rawat# (Note: General Bipin Rawat died on 8 December 2021, at the age of 63.)	Civil Service	Uttarakhand
2022		Kalyan Singh# (Note: Kalyan Singh died on 21 August 2021, at the age of 89.)	Public Affairs	Uttar Pradesh
2023		Balkrishna Vithaldas Doshi# (Note: Balakrishna Doshi died on 24 January 2023, at the age of 95.)	Science and Engineering	Gujarat
2023		Zakir Hussain	Arts	Maharashtra
2023		S. M. Krishna	Public Affairs	Karnataka
2023		Dilip Mahalanabis# (Note: Dilip Mahalanabis died on 16 October 2022, at the age of 87.)	Medicine	West Bengal
2023		S. R. Srinivasa Varadhan*	Science and Engineering	United States
2023		Mulayam Singh Yadav# (Note: Mulayam Singh Yadav died on 10 October 2022, at the age of 82.)	Public Affairs	Uttar Pradesh
2024		Vyjayanthimala	Arts	Tamil Nadu
2024		Chiranjeevi	Arts	Andhra Pradesh
2024		Venkaiah Naidu	Public Affairs	Andhra Pradesh
2024		Bindeshwar Pathak# (Note: Bindeshwar Pathak died on 15 August 2023, at the age of 80.)	Social Work	Bihar
2024		Padma Subrahmanyam	Arts	Tamil Nadu
2025		D. Nageshwar Reddy	Medicine	Telangana
2025		Jagdish Singh Khehar	Public Affairs	Chandigarh
2025		Kumudini Lakhia	Arts	Gujarat
2025		L. Subramaniam	Arts	Karnataka
2025		M. T. Vasudevan Nair# (Note: M. T. Vasudevan Nair died on 25 December 2024, at the age of 91.)	Literature and Education	Kerala
2025		Osamu Suzuki*# (Note: Osamu Suzuki died on 25 December 2024, at the age of 94.)	Trade and Industry	Japan
2025		Sharda Sinha# (Note: Sharda Sinha died on 5 November 2024, at the age of 72.)	Arts	Bihar
2026		Dharmendra# (Note: Dharmendra died on 24 November 2025, at the age of 89.)	Arts	Maharashtra
2026		K. T. Thomas	Public Affairs	Kerala
2026		N. Rajam	Art	Uttar Pradesh
2026		P. Narayanan	Literature and Education	Kerala
2026		V. S. Achuthanandan# (Note: V. S. Achuthanandan died on 21 July 2025, at the age of 101.)	Public Affairs	Kerala

== Explanatory notes ==
Posthumous recipients

== Bibliography ==
- Bhattacherje, S. B. (2009). Encyclopaedia of Indian Events & Dates. Sterling Publishers Pvt. Ltd. ISBN 978-81-207-4074-7.
- Edgar, Thorpe (2011). The Pearson General Knowledge Manual 2011. Pearson Education India. ISBN 978-81-317-5640-9.
- Hoiberg, Dale; Ramchandani, Indu (2000). Students' Britannica India. Vol. 1–5. Popular Prakashan. ISBN 978-81-7156-112-4.
