= T. G. Mohandas =

Indian writer social critic

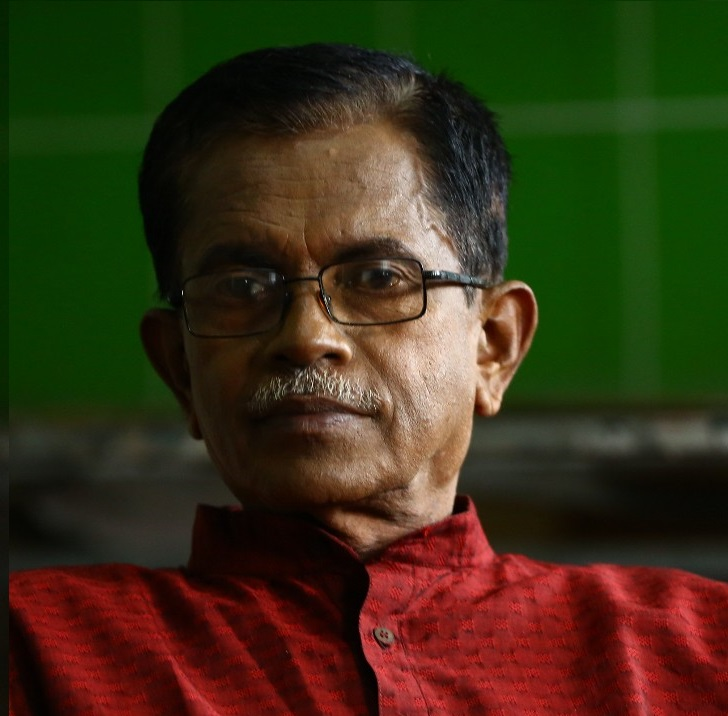
- Mohandas in May 2018
- Born: 1955 (age 70–71)
- Education: College of Engineering Trivandrum (B.Tech); Government Law College, Ernakulam (LLB)
- Known for: Public speaking, ideologue, journalism, controversies
- Website: Official Twitter

T. G. Mohandas (born 1955) is an Indian engineer, lawyer, social critic, writer, journalist and television presenter from Kerala. Mohandas was the state convener of Bharatiya Janata Party's Intellectual Cell and the General Secretary in 1997 of Bharateeya Vichara Kendram and its vice-president in 2006 and served also as General Manager of Ayodhya Printers, a company owned by the Rashtriya Swayamsevak Sangh (RSS). He has also drawn criticism for making hate speech.

== Early life ==
T.G Mohandas was born in Cherthala.

== Controversies ==
- In 2012, T. G. Mohandas wrote an article in the Sangh Parivar publication Kesari about the possibility of an alliance between bitter political rivals BJP and CPI (M). This article sparked debate and some controversy on both sides.
- In 2026 July, comments made by T. G. Mohandas on a private television channel regarding the student protest held at Jantar Mantar in New Delhi sparked widespread controversy and eventually prompted the Kerala government to order an investigation. Mohandas stated that, "If I were in charge of this situation, I would impose a curfew within a four-kilometre radius of Jantar Mantar. I would announce three times, asking the crowd to disperse. After that, I would order the police to open fire. The crowd would scatter in panic. Some people would be killed, and many others would suffer serious injuries or permanent disabilities. Within about four hours, the situation would be brought under control. The bodies would then be collected and taken to hospitals". In another part of the video, Mohandas also described the protesters as criminals and rapists, alleging that they were engaging in lawless and violent behavior. These remarks, made in a YouTube video, drew strong criticism for their derogatory character. Following a series of public complaints, the Thiruvananthapuram City Cyber Crime Police Station registered a criminal case (Crime No. 95/2026) against him. He was booked under Section 66 of the Information Technology Act, Section 120(o) of the Kerala Police Act, and Sections 79, 192, 351(3), and 353(1)(b) of the Bharatiya Nyaya Sanhita (BNS).

== Ideology ==
He came into contact with the RSS from childhood and still continues to be a strong proponent of Hindutva ideology in Kerala. Mohandas serves as the state convener of Bharatiya Janata Party's Intellectual Cell. Mohandas was the General Manager of the newspaper Janmabhumi for a brief period.

== Legal battles ==
- He has filed several public interest litigation cases in Kerala High Court, including his challenge to Government of Kerala decision to donate Rs.5 crore for flood relief in Pakistan.
- T. G. Mohandas filed a writ petition in the Kerala High Court in November 2015, demanding that the provisions of the Travancore Cochin Religious Institution Act, 1950 be declared unconstitutional.
- He filed a petition in Magistrate Court in Ernakulam in February 2017, seeking an effective probe into the case registered in 2013 on the alleged conspiracy to kill P. Parameswaran by Abdul Nazer Mahdani, an Islamic fundamentalist in Kerala. The case was registered by Ernakulam Central police station on his petition to magistrate court and the probe was handed over to Crime Branch. Because of the failure of Kerala police to conduct a proper investigation, he has approached the Kerala HC for an inquiry by CBI and the case is pending.
- He filed a petition in Kerala High Court that had sought a ban on non-Hindus entering the Sabarimala temple and the court rejected the petition by saying the petition was likely to disturb the secular fabric of society.
- On August 10, 2026, Mohandas was arrested from his residence by the Kerala Police and produced before the Court of the Additional Chief Judicial Magistrate in Thiruvananthapuram. On the same day, the court granted him regular bail (Crl.MP No. 1/2026). In the bail order, the Magistrate pulled up the police for bypassing statutory protections under Section 35(3) of the Bharatiya Nagarik Suraksha Sanhita (BNSS), noting that the rule of serving a prior notice was violated without a justifiable emergency. The court further observed that custodial interrogation was unwarranted since the primary digital devices (including a mobile phone and hard disk) had already been seized, and taking into consideration his advanced age (71) and chronic health ailments. He was released under strict conditions, which included a personal bond of ₹50,000 and an injunction prohibiting him from using digital platforms to discuss the ongoing case or intimidate witnesses. However, the court explicitly noted that as a senior journalist, he remains at liberty to use digital platforms and social media in the ordinary course of his profession and for legitimate journalistic purposes.

== Works ==
T. G. Mohandas has authored several articles on Indian philosophy, politics and society. His works continuously published in weeklies like Kesari , Kalakaumudi, Organiser and news-dailies like Mathrubhumi, Mangalam, Kerala Kaumudi, Janmabhumi etc. He actively participates in news channel debates representing Bharatiya Janata Party.

On the Malayalam news channel Janam TV, Mohandas hosts the prominent weekly prime-time program titled Polichezhuthu (transl. Deconstruction), which airs every Saturday at 8:30 PM IST. The program operates as a platform for sharp social and political criticism, tracking contemporary political developments in Kerala and across India. By mid-2025, the show had broadcast over 430 episodes, with archived broadcasts and digital extensions actively cataloged on the official Janam TV YouTube Channel and through designated digital playlists like Janam Online - Polichezhuthu. Live iterations of the broadcast are also syndicated across multi-platform networks, including regional live-streaming services on JioTV Janam TV.

== Awards ==
In 2017, his TV programme in Janam TV Polichezhuthu received Tenth Thikkurissy Foundation award in the category of Best Social Criticism Programme.

== See also ==
- David Frawley
- Koenraad Elst
- P. Parameswaran
- Kummanam Rajasekharan
