= Sreenivasan (disambiguation) =

Sreenivasan (1950-2025) was an Indian film actor, screenwriter, and director in Malayalam cinema.

Sreenivasan may also refer to:

- Sreenivasan Jain, an Indian journalist
- Gopal Sreenivasan, Canadian philosopher
- M. A. Sreenivasan, an Indian minister
- Sreenath Sreenivasan, an Indian academic

== See also ==
- Srinivasa, a form of the Hindu deity Vishnu
- Srinivas or Srinivasan, an Indian male given name
- Srinivasan (Tamil actor), an Indian actor and comedian in Tamil cinema
