= Janmabhumi =

Indian newspaper

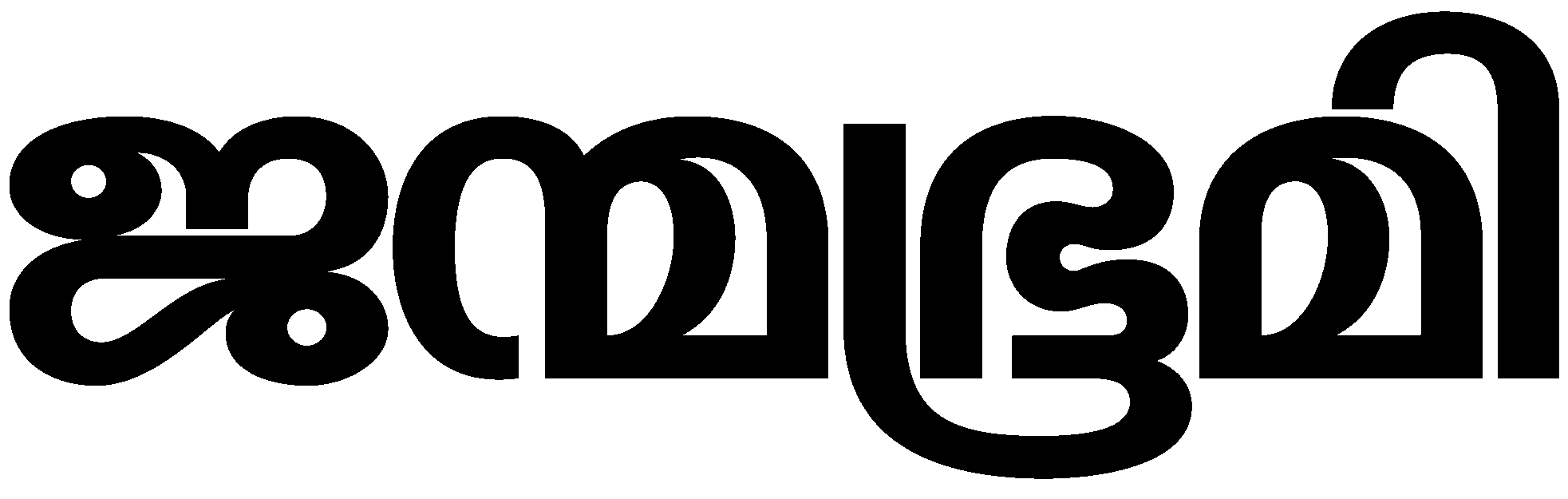

- Type: Daily newspaper
- Format: Broadsheet
- Owner: Mathruka Pracharanalayam Ltd.
- Publisher: P. C. Krishna Varma Raja
- Editor: K. N. R. Namboothiri
- Managing editor: K. R. Umakanthan
- Founded: 28 April 1975; 51 years ago
- Political alignment: Bharatiya Janata Party
- Language: Malayalam
- Headquarters: Kochi, Kerala, India
- Country: India
- OCLC number: 11387591
- Website: epaper.janmabhumi.in

Janmabhumi is an Indian Malayalam-language daily newspaper, owned by Mathruka Pracharanalayam Ltd. and headquartered in Kochi, Kerala. It was launched as an evening paper from Kozhikode on 28 April 1975. From 14 November 1977 onwards it was upgraded to a daily newspaper publishing from Ernakulam. Currently Janmabhumi has nine editions. The newspaper is politically aligned with the BJP.

== Overview ==
Janmabhumi follows the motto: "A Newspaper for Social Reformation and National Reconstruction". The newspaper publishes editions from Kochi, Kottayam, Kannur, Thrissur, Thiruvananthapuram, Kozhikode, Bengaluru, Kollam and Pathanamthitta.

- Managing Director: M. Radhakrishnan
- Managing Editor: K. R. Umakanthan
- Editor: K. N. R. Namboothiri

The 16-page multi-colour newspaper has two special issues every week. Varadyam, a Sunday supplement and Mitram, a four-page pullout on Wednesdays. Samskruthi is a regular page with articles on various Indian culture, such as history, Puranas, Upanishads, Ayurveda, Yoga, philosophy, art, ideologies and devotional subjects etc.

== History ==
In 1968, the state council of the Bharatiya Jana Sangh was held at Thalassery, Kerala and considered a proposal by K. Raman Pillai, for starting a daily newspaper in Malayalam language. With U. Dathathreya Rao as chief promoter and C. Prabhakaran, Punnath Chandran, M. Sreedharan, K. C. Sankaran, V. C. Achuthan as co promoters, Mathruka Pracharanalayam Ltd. was registered in January 1973 with the objective of publishing a Malayalam newspaper. Subsequently, the Rashtra Vartha newspaper was taken over by the company. In 1975, the name Janmabhumi was acquired and the necessary declaration was signed. P. Narayanan was the chief editor, P. V. K. Nedungadi as editor, Dathathreya Rao as printer and publisher and a few others as sub-editors and reporters took charge.

Janmabhumi was launched as an Newspaper from Kozhikode on 28 April 1975. In the first copy of editorial column it explicitly declared that "Janmabhumi is a total independent national daily. It will approach each problem on the basis of national unity, moral sense, patriotism and public welfare and think, evaluate and formulate our opinion. To err is human and we also commit mistakes, our capacity is limited. We consider this as a small step to the noble cause and great movement and appealed the co-operation of all people".

However, after two months, the state of emergency in India was declared in June 1975. Rao, Nedungadi and Narayanan were arrested by the police and kept under detention. Nedungadi was let of after few days. Even though there was no ban on the paper the administration created conditions that did not allow to continue. Rao was released only after the emergency was lifted. Narayanan was acquitted of all charges by the court and released after four months. After the restoration of democracy in March 1977, Janmabhumi resumed publication from Ernakulam. A new decoration was signed, with Narayanan as printer and publisher and M. P. Manmadhan as chief editor.

On 14 November 1977, Janmabhumi was launched from Ernakulam. M. K. Balagopal who worked in The Indian Express associated with the editorial department. Kummanam Rajasekharan trained the amateur newcomers in the paper. K. Chandran who was working during the pre-emergency period took charge of the news desk. It was a four-page newspaper with price tag of 0.25 paisa. Its financial base was not strong. The early journalists were not experienced and grew up learning. Balaram Moosad, P. Narayana Kurup and I. K. K. Menon used to write regularly during the early period. After one year Manmadhan wanted to leave the responsibility because of health problem. Nedungadi took charge as chief editor. K. G. Marar took charge as managing director when Rao retired.

The printing of Janmabhumi was in the old method of hand composing and sheet-fed printing. Under the initiative of Sundaram, a new company was formed, Ayodhya Printers Pvt Ltd. at Elamakkara, Kochi and installed latest photo composing and offset printing machinery. Janmabhumi shifted to the new location on 21 April 1987. The new press and paper was inaugurated by L. K. Advani. V. M. Korath retired from Mathrubhumi as Deputy Editor took charge as chief editor in Janmabhumi. But retired after one year due to health fail. P. Narayanan succeeded him in 1993. Kummanam Rajasekharan took charge as editor. P. E. B. Menon, P. P. Mukundan, K. Sadananda Pillai, etc formed an advisory committee to guide both the establishments. M. Mohanan was appointed general manager of both. M. Mahadevan took charge as the Manager.

When V. M. Korath finally relinquished charge as chief editor in 1993, P. Narayanan was given the charge. In 1995, K. G. Marar died and P. P. Mukundan elected as managing director. He took initiative to expand the base of Janmabhumi by starting new editions. N. S. Rammohan became the Managing Editor and T. M. V. Shenoy took charge as printer and publisher. K. Kunhikannan as Resident Editor

On 26 June 1995, former deputy prime minister of India and then BJP National President L. K. Advani inaugurated the evening edition at Thiruvananthapuram. On 13 April 2005, Bharatiya Vichara Kendram Director P. Parameswaran inaugurated edition at Kottayam and RSS Sarsangh 'Sarkaryavah,' Shri Mohan Bhagwat inaugurated Kannur Edition on 17 January 2008.

After Hari S. Kartha, Ramachandran and Leela Menon were chief editors.

The 6th edition of Janmabhumi from Thrissur was inaugurated on 20 June 2014 by Union Minister Sri. Prakash Javadekar. Janmabhumi moved outside Kerala, launching Edition in Bengaluru on 27 April 2018 by Actor and Parliament Member Sri.Suresh Gopi. The 8th edition of Janmabhumi launched from Kollam on 27 September 2018 by Union Minister Sri. Rajnath Singh. On 11 February 2020 Union Minister V. Muraleedharan launched the Pathanamthitta edition.

Janmabhumi Online, the digital media division, was launched in 2008 by spiritual leader and Art of Living founder Ravi Shankar.

== See also ==
- List of Malayalam-language newspapers
- Organiser
- List of newspapers in India
