= Kesari (magazine) =

Malayalam language Magazine

- Categories: Cultural magazine
- Publisher: Hindustan Prakashan
- First issue: November 27, 1951; 74 years ago
- Country: India
- Based in: Kozhikode
- Language: Malayalam

Kesari is a weekly Malayalam language magazine affiliated publication of the Hindu nationalist volunteer organisation Rashtriya Swayamsevak Sangh (RSS) and it is also known as the mouthpiece of the RSS Kerala.

== History ==
Kesari was started in 1951 by prominent RSS activists in Kozhikode including Shankara Shastri. Kesari was first issued on November 27, 1951, with P. Parameswaran as the editor-in-chief. In 1962, a trust called Hindustan Prakashan was formed and Kesari's ownership was vested in it. Kesari, like other newspapers, was registered under the Press Act, which came into force in 1957. Padma Vibhushan, P. Parameswaran and R Venugopal have held senior posts at Kesari.

== Controversies ==
- An article in Kesari about former Prime Minister Jawaharlal Nehru caused controversy nationally.
- An article in Kesari Weekly highlighting the relevance of the RSS-CPM friendship led to controversy in Kerala.
- An article praising Pinarayi Vijayan appeared on Kesari's website, after which Kesari disowned it and claimed its account was hacked.

== See also ==
- Organiser (magazine)
- Janmabhumi
