= Bhola Nath Jha =

Padma Vibhushan (1967) awardee for civil services

Bhola Nath Jha is the recipient of Padma Vibhushan (1967), the second highest civilian honour of India, for his contribution to the field of civil services.

== See also ==
- List of Padma Vibhushan award recipients
