= P. Narayanan (journalist) =

Indian journalist and RSS leader

- Born: 28 May 1936 (age 90); Manakkad, Thodupuzha, Travancore (now Kerala), India
- Occupations: Journalist, writer
- Known for: Co-founder and former Editor-in-Chief of Janmabhumi
- Awards: Padma Vibhushan (2026)

P. Narayanan (born 28 May 1936), also known as Narayanji, is an Indian journalist and writer associated with the Rashtriya Swayamsevak Sangh (RSS). He is the co-founder and former Editor-in-Chief of the Malayalam daily Janmabhumi.

In 2026, he was awarded the Padma Vibhushan, India's second-highest civilian honour, in the category of Literature and Education. In media interactions following the announcement, he described the award as unexpected.

== See also ==
- Padma Vibhushan
- List of Padma Vibhushan award recipients
