= Sreenivasan Jain =

Indian journalist

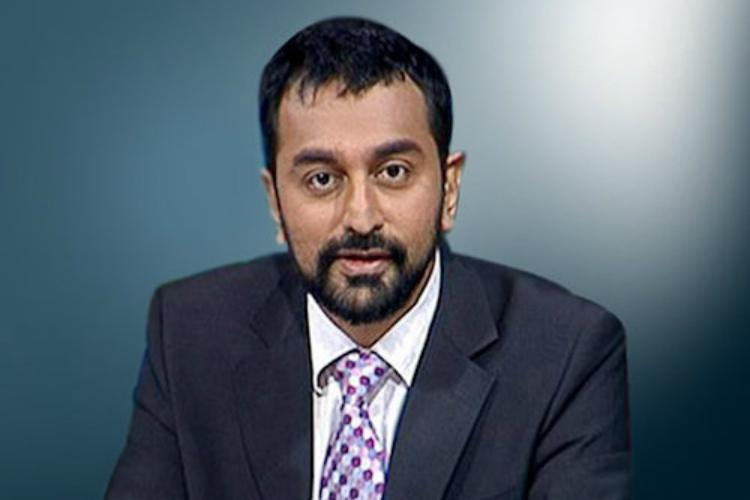
- Born: 21 November, 1969; India
- Education: Rishi Valley School; Hindu College, Delhi University of Delhi; University of Sussex
- Occupation: Journalist
- Years active: 1995–present
- Parent(s): Lakshmi Chand Jain; Devaki Jain

Sreenivasan Jain is an Indian journalist who worked for NDTV from 1995 to January 2023. He is currently a freelancer.

== Early life ==
Jain is the grandson of M. A. Sreenivasan, a minister in the Princely State of Mysore, and the son of Devaki Jain and Lakshmi Chand Jain.

== Career ==
He was a prominent face of NDTV, and during his three-decade career with the news network, served as the anchor of NDTV's popular programmes, such as Reality Check, Truth vs Hype. He was also the channel's Group Editor. He was NDTV's Mumbai bureau chief from 2003 to 2008. He was also briefly managing editor of NDTV's business channel, Profit. He is also an op-ed columnist for the Business Standard newspaper. An op-ed column in The Hoot, an independent South Asian media watchdog, praised Jain's television coverage of the 2013 Muzaffarnagar riots.

On 28 January 2023, Jain announced that he is quitting the channel after a nearly three-decade-long career.

Jain, with co-authors Mariyam Alavi and Supriya Sharma, wrote Love Jihad and Other Fictions: Simple Facts to Counter Viral Falsehoods. The book debunked viral conspiracy theories peddled by the Hindu right wing targeting India's Muslim minority. It was published by Aleph Book Company in January 2024.

Jain later began a freelance career with Newslaundry, founded by Abhinandan Sekhri, Madhu Trehan and Prashant Sareen, and Al Jazeera. He was adjunct faculty at O.P. Jindal Global University till December 2024.

== Awards ==
- Jain won the 2006 Best Anchor News/Current Affairs award instituted by the Indian Television Academy.
- In September 2014, Jain won the Ramnath Goenka award for 'Journalist of the Year'.
- In April 2015, Jain won the 'Journalist of the Year' award at the RedInk journalism awards, given by the Press Club, Mumbai.
