= D. Vijayamohan =

Indian journalist and editor (1955–2020)

- Born: 28 February 1955; Nedumangadu, Thiruvananthapuram, Kerala, India
- Died: 15 December 2020 (aged 65); New Delhi, India
- Education: Mar Ivanios College; University College Thiruvananthapuram
- Occupations: Journalist, writer
- Employer: Malayala Manorama
- Notable work: Chentharkazhal; A. Ramachandrante Varamozhikal; Ee Lokam, Athiloru Mukundan; Humour in Parliament; Swami Ranganathananda
- Spouse: S. Jayashree
- Children: One son
- Awards: 1986 Kerala Press Academy V. Karunakaran Nambiar Award; 1987 Press Club, Thiruvananthapuram M. Sivaram Award; 1995 Malayala Manorama Chief Editor's Gold Medal; 2004 Government of Kerala Developmental Journalism Award; 2005 Kerala Lalithakala Akademi Award; 2007 P. K. Parameshwaran Nair Award

D. Vijayamohan (1955–2020) was an Indian journalist, writer, and the senior coordinating editor at the Delhi bureau of the Malayala Manorama. Known for his journalistic coverage of the politics in New Delhi since 1985, he was a Harry Brittain fellow of the Commonwealth Press Union and a recipient of several honors, including the Award for Developmental Journalism of the Government of Kerala, V. Karunakaran Nambiar Award of Kerala Press Academy, and the Kerala Lalitha Kala Akademi Award.

== Biography ==
D. Vijayamohan was born on 28 February 1955 at Karingayil Karakkattukonathu house in Nedumangad, in Thiruvananthapuram district of the south Indian state of Kerala to P. K. Damodaran Nair and S. Maheswari Amma. After completing his schooling at Kairalee Nikethan School, Bengaluru and Government High School, Nedumangad, he secured a bachelor's degree in economics from Mar Ivanios College and followed it up with a master's degree from the University College Thiruvananthapuram. Subsequently, he joined Malayala Manorama in 1978 and worked at their Kozhikode, Kollam and Thiruvananthapuram bureaus before moving to the Indian capital in 1985 to join the New Delhi bureau of the newspaper. It was during this time, he obtained a Harry Brittain fellowship of the Commonwealth Press Union and completed higher studies in journalism in the UK. He was associated with Malayala Manorama ever since.

Vijayamohan was the founder president of the New Delhi unit of the Kerala Union of Working Journalists. He also served as a member of the Press Advisory Council of the Lok Sabha and sat in the Central Board of Film Certification. He has written a number of books, starting with Chentharkazhal, an anthology of poems. A. Ramachandrante Varamozhikal, a book on the life and works of the noted painter, A. Ramachandran, Ee Lokam, Athiloru Mukundan, Humour in Parliament, and Swami Ranganathananda, a biography of the Swami Ranganathananda, are his other works.

During the COVID pandemic, Vijayamohan contracted the disease and was hospitalized at St Stephen's Hospital, Delhi and it was here, he died on 15 December 2020, at the age of 65, due to post-Covid complications. He was survived by his wife, S. Jayashree, son, V. M. Vishnu, an advocate and Neenu, his daughter-in-law.

== Awards and honors ==
Vijayamohan received the V. Karunakaran Nambiar Award of Kerala Press Academy in 1986, and a year later, he received the M. Sivaram Award of the Press Club, Thiruvananthapuram. When Malayala Manorama instituted a Chief Editor's Gold Medal for excellence in journalism in 1995, he was the first recipient of the honor. He received the Award for Developmental Journalism of the Government of Kerala in 2004 and the next year, his book on A. Ramachandran fetched him the Kerala Lalithakala Akademi Award. The book on Swami Ranganathananda was selected for P. K. Parameshwaran Nair Award in 2007.

== Bibliography ==
- D. Vijayamohan (2016). Swami Ranganaathaananda (in Malayalam). Mathrubhumi Books. p. 180. ISBN 9788182666931.
- D. Vijayamohan (2015). Chentharkazhal (in Malayalam). Current Books. p. 55.
- D. Vijayamohan (2006). A. Ramachandrante Varamozhikal (in Malayalam). Rainbow Books. ISBN 8188146579.
- D. Vijayamohan (2004). Ee Lokam Athiloru Mukundan (in Malayalam). Current Books. p. 180. ISBN 9788182666931.
- D. Vijayamohan. Humour in Parliament.

== See also ==
- Ranganathananda
