= Radheshyam Khemka =

Journalist (1935–2021)

Radheshyam Khemka (12 December 1935 – 3 April 2021) was a journalist and editor who later served as the chairperson of the Gita Press. In 2014, he was appointed chairperson of Gita Press. He worked as an editor for Gita Press for 38 years.

In the year 2022, he was posthumously awarded the Padma Vibhushan in literature and education.

== Early life and education ==
Khemka was born on 12 December 1935, in Munger district, Bihar, to a Marwari family. His father, Sitaram Khemka, was Hindu and active in the cow protection movement. His mother was a homemaker.

After completing his primary education, Khemka and his family moved to Varanasi in 1956. He obtained a master's degree in Sanskrit from Banaras Hindu University. Later, he got involved in the business of papermaking.

Khemka was touched by the life of Swami Karpatriji. He thought of him as his guru. Swami Karpatriji was the one who encouraged Khemka to serve Gita Press.

In 1982, he handed over the business to his children, Rajaram and Rajeshwari, and started working for Gita Press.

== Career ==
In 1982, Khemka joined Gita Press. He first edited the November and December issues of the monthly magazine Kalyan that year. He eventually became Kalyan's full-time editor in March 1983, a position he held until April 2021.

Khemka edited 38 yearly issues and 460 monthly periodicals at Gita Press. During his tenure, he promoted technical advancements at Gita Press and equipped the press with modern equipment. This increased the efficiency and quality of the press.

He made accurate versions of rare books, like the Puranas, and put them in Kalyan magazine so that everyone could read them. He also put out special issues on current topics like health and education to make people more aware of them.

== Pious lifestyle ==
Khemka had a religious inclination since childhood. He lived a disciplined life and served sadhus and the poor. He stayed in close touch with Swami Karpatri Ji, Shankaracharya Swami Swaroopanand Saraswati, Puri's Swami Niranjan Dev Tirth, Peethadheeshwar Swami Nishchalananda, and Katha Vyas Ramchandra Dongre throughout his life.

He dedicated his life to advancing Hindu culture. He supported and practiced Hindu customs like dharma, karma, and "puja-path" worship.

During the Magh Mela, which is held in Allahabad in the month of January and February, he did a month-long Kalpwas for 60 years. In Kalpwas, a person makes a promise to sleep on the ground, fast during the day, bathe three times a day in the holy water of the Ganges, and spend the whole day doing religious activities.

During the last several years of his life, he was known to drink only the sanctified water of the Ganges, "Gangaajal".

== Social engagement ==
He was involved with a number of social and religious groups, such as Varanasi's Marwari Seva Sangh, Mumukshu Bhavan, Shriram Lakshmi Marwari Hospital Godaulia, Birla Hospital Machhodari, and Kashi Goshala Trust.

== Death ==
On 3 April 2021, at the age of 86, he died at his residence in Kedarghat, Kashi. He was cremated at Harishchandra Ghat.

== Honors ==
In 2022, Radheshyam Khemka was posthumously awarded the Padma Vibhushan, India's second-highest civilian award, for his contributions to literature and education.
