= Devaki Jain =

Indian economist (born 1933)

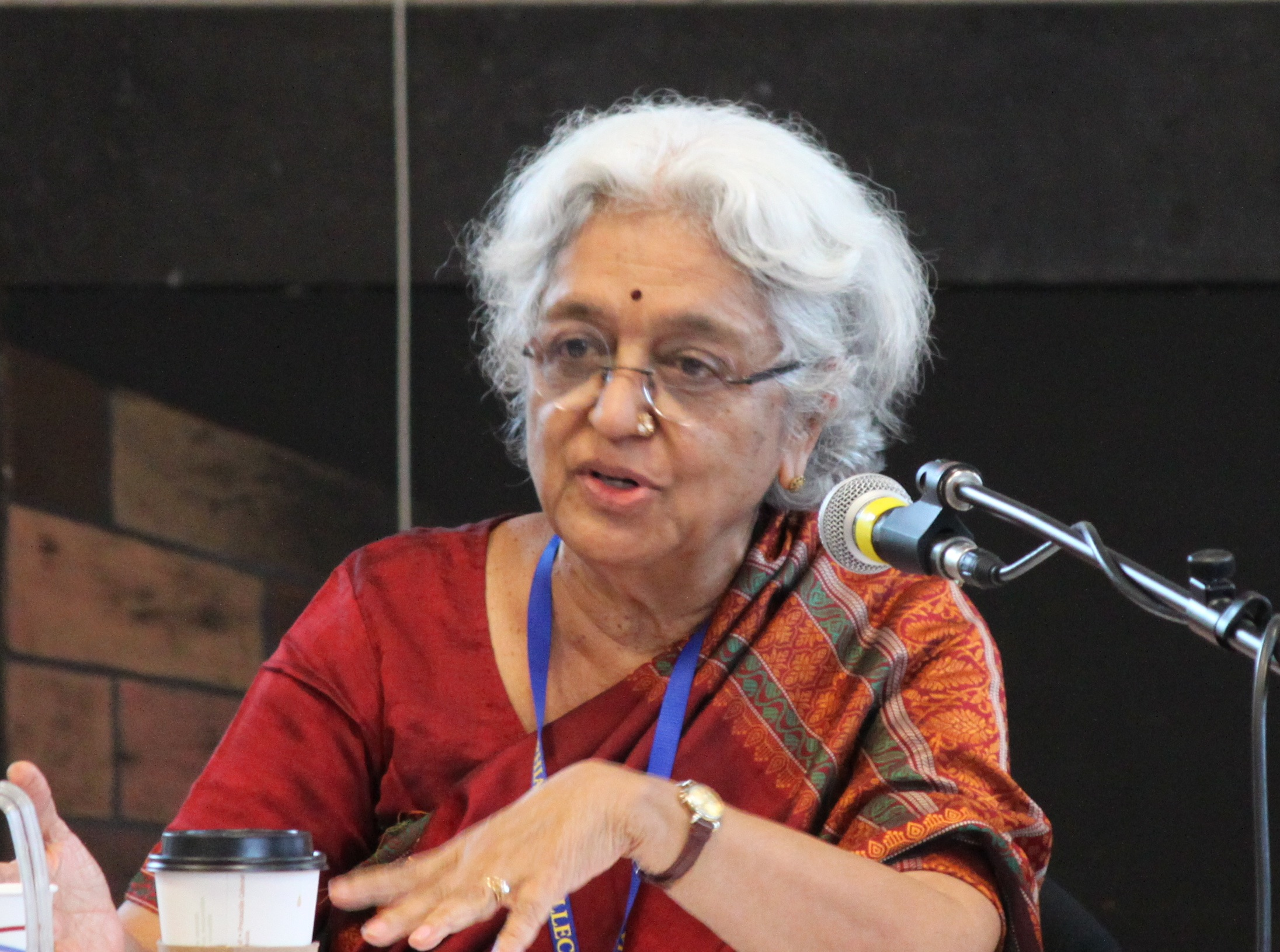
- Devaki Jain
- Born: 1933 (age 92–93); Mysore, Karnataka, India
- Awards: Padma Bhushan

Academic background
- Education: Mysore University; St Anne's College, Oxford

Academic work
- Institutions: University of Delhi
- Main interests: Feminist economics

Devaki Jain (born 1933) is an Indian economist and writer, who has worked mainly in the field of feminist economics. In 2006 she was awarded the Padma Bhushan, the third-highest civilian award from Government of India, for her contribution to social justice and the empowerment of women.

== Early life and education ==
Jain was born in Mysore, the daughter of M. A. Sreenivasan, a minister in the Princely State of Mysore and was also Dewan of Gwalior.

Jain studied at various convent schools in India. Having graduated from Mysore University in 1953 with three gold medals for the first rank in Mathematics, English, and Overall Performance she later attended St Anne's College, Oxford. Having graduated from Oxford with a degree in Philosophy, Politics, and Economics, she then taught economics at Delhi University until 1969.

== United Nations and international networking ==
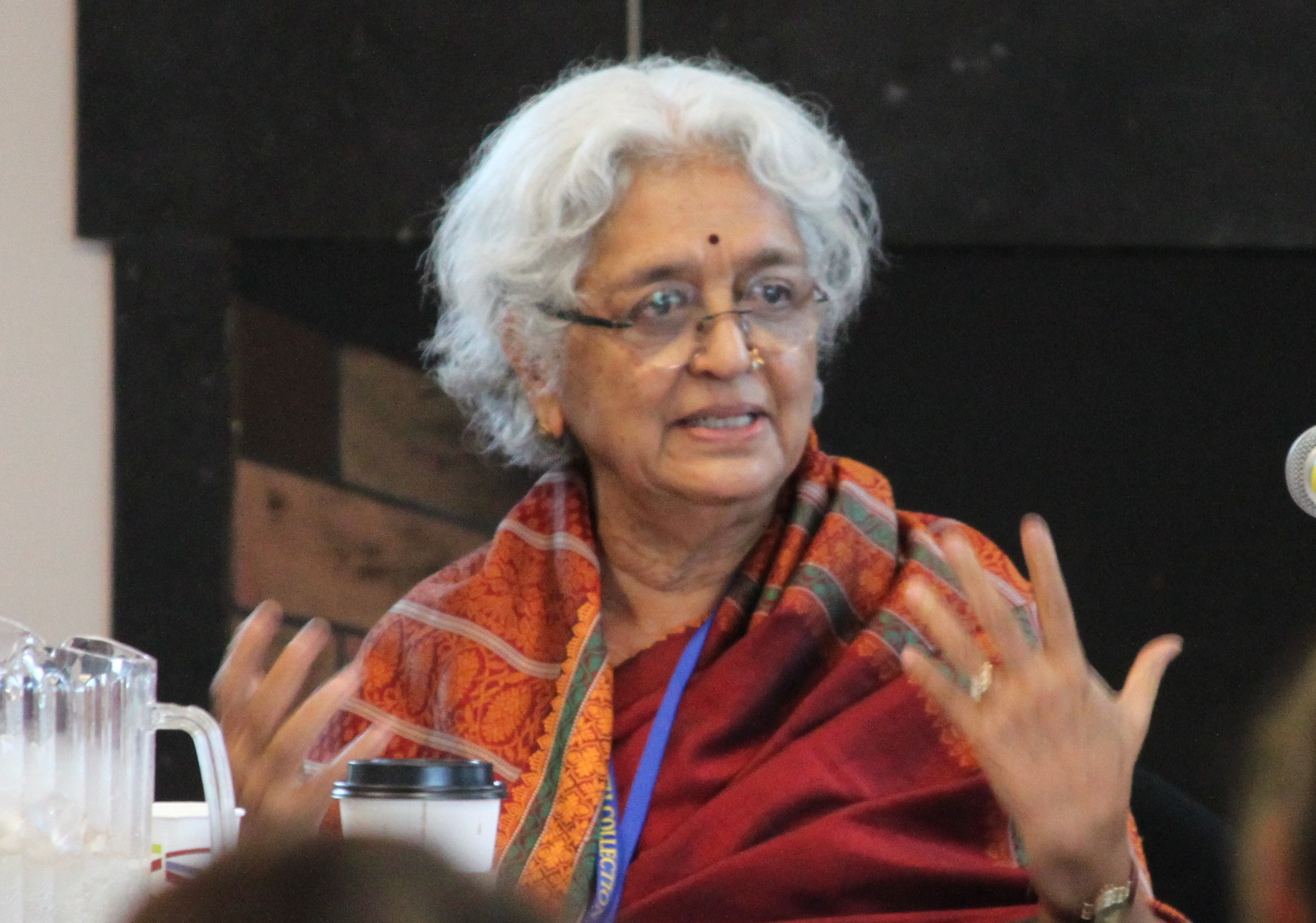
Devaki Jain in June 2011

Through working on her book, Women in India, she involved herself in feminist issues. She took an active part in writing, lecturing, networking, building, leading, and supporting women.

Jain was founder of the Institute of Social Studies Trust (ISST) in New Delhi and served as director until 1994. She has also worked in the field of women's employment and edited the book Indian Women for India's International Women's Year.

Gandhian philosophy has influenced Jain's work and life. In line with this philosophy, her academic research has focused on issues of equity, democratic decentralization, people-centered development, and women's rights. She has worked for local, national, and international women's movements. She currently lives in Bangalore, India.

Jain has traveled extensively as a participant in many networks and forums. As Chair of the Advisory Committee on Gender for the United Nations Centre in Asia-Pacific, she has visited numerous countries, including most Pacific and Caribbean Island. In Africa, she has visited Mozambique, Tanzania, Kenya, Nigeria, Benin and Senegal, Liberia, Cote D'Ivoir, South Africa and Botswana. Along with Julius Nyerere, she had the privilege of meeting with and discussing the visions and concerns of African leaders. She is also a member of the erstwhile South Commission founded by Nyerere.

She was a member of the Advisory Panel set up by the United Nations Development Programme (UNDP) to advise on the preparation of the 1997 Human Development Report on Poverty and for the 2002 Report on Governance. She was a member of the Eminent Persons Group of the Graça Machel Study Group appointed by the UN to study the Impact of Armed Conflict on Children.

In Women, Development, and the UN—A Sixty-Year Quest for Equality and Justice she shows how women's contributions have changed and shaped developments and practices at the UN. She introduces the term "feminization of poverty" from the feminist economist point of view. "'Feminization of poverty,'" Jain explains, "was used to describe three distinct elements: that women have a higher incidence of poverty than men, that women's poverty is more severe than that of men, that a trend toward greater poverty among women is associated with rising rates of female-headed households."(Jain 2005) According to her, "feminization of work" connotes low-quality, lowly-paid work. Jain argues that "feminization" devalues the increased presence of women.

== Academic life ==
Devaki Jain was awarded a fellowship to the Scandinavian Institute for Asian Studies Copenhagen, in the year 1983 to lecture in 9 Universities in the Region on Gender & Poverty. She was awarded an Honorary Doctorate (1999) from the University of Durban-Westville, Republic of South Africa. She also received the Bradford Morse Memorial Award (1995) from the UNDP at the Beijing World Conference. She was a visiting Fellow at the Institute of Development Studies, University of Sussex (1993) and a Fulbright Senior Fellow affiliated both with Harvard University and Boston University (1984). She was also a Fellow at the Government of Karnataka's State Planning Board, a member of the UGC's Standing Committee on Women's Studies, and a member of the South Commission, when chaired by Julius Nyerere. In the academic year 2013–14, she was Plumer Visiting Fellow at her alma mater, St Anne's College, Oxford.

== Personal life ==
She was married to the Gandhian economist Lakshmi Chand Jain from 1966 until his death in 2010. She has two children, including Sreenivasan Jain, the ex managing editor of NDTV.

== Selected bibliography ==
=== Books ===
- Jain, Devaki (1975). Indian women. New Delhi, India: Publications Division, Ministry of Information and Broadcasting, Government of India. OCLC 1646453.
- Jain, Devaki; Singh, Nalini; Chand, Malini (1980). Women's quest for power: five Indian case studies. Sahibabad, District. Ghaziabad, Delhi, India: Vikas Publishing. ISBN 9780706910216.
- Jain, Devaki; Banerjee, Nirmala (1985). Tyranny of the household: investigative essays on women's work. Sahibabad, District. Ghaziabad, Delhi, India: Vikas Publishing. ISBN 9780706927856.
- Jain, Devaki; Eck, Diana L. (1986). Speaking of faith: cross-cultural perspectives on women, religion, and social change. London: Women's Press. ISBN 9780704340169.
- Jain, Devaki (October 1997). For women to lead - ideas and experiences from Asia: a study on the legal and political impediments to gender equality in governance. New Delhi, India: National Commission for Women (India). OCLC 42716773.
- Jain, Devaki (2000). The vocabulary of women's politics. New Delhi: Friedrich Ebert Stiftung. ISBN 9788174400536.
- Jain, Devaki; Rajput, Pam (2003). Narratives from the women's studies family: recreating knowledge. New Delhi Thousand Oaks, California: Sage Publications. ISBN 9780761996958.
- Jain, Devaki (2005). Women, development, and the UN a sixty-year quest for equality and justice. Bloomington, Indiana: Indiana University Press. ISBN 9780253218193.
- Jain, Devaki (September 2018). Close Encounters of Another Kind . Women and Development Economics. SAGE Publisher India. ISBN 9789352807727
- Jain, Devaki (19 March 2018). The Journey of a Southern Feminist. SAGE Publisher India. ISBN 9789352806232
- Jain, Devaki (October 2020). The Brass Notebook: A Memoir. Speaking Tiger. ISBN 9789389958676

=== Book chapters ===
- Jain, Devaki (March–June 1975). "Indian women: some reflections on two sector analysis". Social Change. 5 (1–2). Sage: 17–20. doi:10.1177/0049085719750103. Archived from the original on 25 July 2014.
- Jain, Devaki (1979). "Measuring women's work: some methodological issues". In Jahan, Rounaq; Papanek, Hanna; Bangladesh Institute of Law and International Affairs (eds.). Women and development: perspectives from South and South East Asia. Columbia USA: South Asia Books. ISBN 9780836405965.
- Jain, Devaki (1989). "The culture of the poor". In Peeradina, Saleem; Braganza, Karuna M. (eds.). Cultural forces shaping India. New Delhi, India: All India Association for Christian Higher Education: S.G. Wasani for Macmillan India. ISBN 9780333909720.
- Jain, Devaki (1995). "Healing the wounds of development". In Conway, Jill K.; Bourque, Susan C. (eds.). The Politics of women's education: perspectives from Asia, Africa, and Latin America. Ann Arbor: University of Michigan Press. pp. 45–58. ISBN 9780472083282.
- Jain, Devaki (2001). "Democratising culture". In Vohra, N. N. (ed.). Culture, democracy, and development in South Asia. New Delhi: Shipra Publications. ISBN 9788175410701.
- Jain, Devaki (2004). "Feminist networks, peoples movements, and alliances: learning from the ground". In Ricciutelli, Luciana; Miles, Angela; McFadden, Margaret H. (eds.). Feminist politics, activism and vision: local and global challenges. Toronto London New York New York: Inanna Publications and Education Zed Distributed in the USA by Palgrave Macmillan. ISBN 9781842773505.
- Jain, Devaki (2004). "A view from the south: a story of intersections". In Fraser, Arvonne S.; Tinker, Irene (eds.). Developing power: how women transformed international development. New York: Feminist Press at the City University of New York. ISBN 9781558614840.
- Jain, Devaki (2004). "Quest for healing". In Menon, Sangeetha; Sinha, Anindya; Clayton, Philip; Narasimha, Roddam; Sreekantan, B.V. (eds.). Science and beyond: cosmology, consciousness, and technology in the Indic traditions. Bangalore, India: National Institute of Advanced Studies. ISBN 9788187663560.
- Jain, Devaki (2005). "A view from the south: a story of intersections". In Harrison, Faye V. (ed.). Resisting racism and xenophobia: global perspectives on race, gender, and human rights. Walnut Creek, California: AltaMira Press. ISBN 9780759104822.
- Jain, Devaki (2005). "Introduction: feminist theory and practice". In Ganesh, Kamala; Thakkar, Usha (eds.). Culture and the making of identity in contemporary India. New Delhi Thousand Oaks, California: Sage Publications. pp. 184–201. ISBN 9780761933076.

=== Journal articles ===
- Jain, Devaki (7 July 1990). "Development theory and practice: insights emerging from women's experience". Economic and Political Weekly. 25 (27): 1454–1455. JSTOR 4396465.
- Jain, Devaki; Desai, Sonalde (March 1994). "Maternal employment and changes in family dynamics: the social context of women's work in rural South India". Population and Development Review. 20 (1): 115–136. doi:10.2307/2137632. JSTOR 2137632.
- Jain, Devaki (26 October 1996). "Valuing work: time as a measure". Economic and Political Weekly. 31 (43): WS46–WS57. JSTOR 4404708.
- Jain, Devaki (2002). "For whom the bell tolls: democracy and development in South Asia". Cambridge Review of International Affairs. 15 (2): 299–310. doi:10.1080/09557570220151335a. S2CID 144930997.
- Jain, Devaki (24 February – 2 March 2007). "To be or not to be: problems in locating women in public policy". Economic and Political Weekly. 42 (8): 691–696. JSTOR 4419285.

=== Papers ===
- Jain, Devaki (1995). Women and trade liberalization - South Asia's opportunities, workshop on global trading practices and poverty alienation in South Asia. New Delhi, India: UNIFEM-SIDA (Swedish International Development Authority) Conference. Cited here: page 133, ref. 29.
- Jain, Devaki; Abzug, Bella (August 1996). Women's leadership and the ethics of development (Gender in Development Monograph Series #4). New York: UNDP United Nations Development Programme. Link.
- Jain, Devaki (September 1996). Panchayat Raj: women changing governance (Gender in Development Monograph Series #5). New York: UNDP United Nations Development Programme. Link.

=== Lectures ===
- Nuancing globalisation or Mainstreaming the downstream or Reforming Reform – Nita Barrow Memorial Lecture, University of West Indies, Barbados, November 1999
- Development as if Women Mattered - Can Women Build a new Paradigm? OECD, Paris, 1983
- Indian Women; Today and Tomorrow, Padmaja Naidu Memorial Lecture, Published by Nehru Memorial Museum and Library, New Delhi, 1982
- Gender-apartheid as a hindrance to development: Women and the Global Economy, A public conference convened by Alliance Sud and the Swiss Agency for Development and Cooperation (SDC) 15 November 2005, Berne (Switzerland)
- Women's Rights between the UN Human Rights Regime and Free Trade Agreements, Globalising Women's Rights: Confronting unequal development between the, UN rights framework and WTO-trade agreements, Bonn, 19–22 May 2004
- Are We Knowledge Proof? Development as Waste speech delivered at Lovraj Kumar Memorial Lecture, 26 September, New Delhi (Reprinted in Wastelands News, Vol. 19(1), August–October 2003, "Society for Promotion of Wastelands Development", New Delhi, pp. 19–30
- Through the looking glass of poverty, Paper presented at New Hall Cambridge, United kingdom, 19 October 2001.
- Valuing Women- Signals From The Ground (Broad Theme: Cultural Diversity And Universal Norms) Opening Session: 1 June 2001, For The University Of Maryland, USA
- The Torture of Women: Some Dimensions, paper presented at VII International Symposium on Torture, September 1999, New

=== Other ===
She contributed the piece "A condition across caste and class" to the 1984 anthology Sisterhood Is Global: The International Women's Movement Anthology, edited by Robin Morgan.

== See also ==
- Feminist economics
- List of feminist economists
