= Lakshmi Chand Jain =

Indian independence activist and businessperson

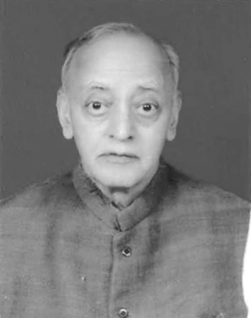
- Born: 13 December 1925; Bahadurpur, Rajasthan, India
- Died: 14 November 2010 (aged 84); New Delhi, India
- Occupation(s): Freedom fighter, cooperative leader
- Known for: Gandhian, freedom fighter, former bureaucrat and 1989 Ramon Magsaysay Award winner

Signature
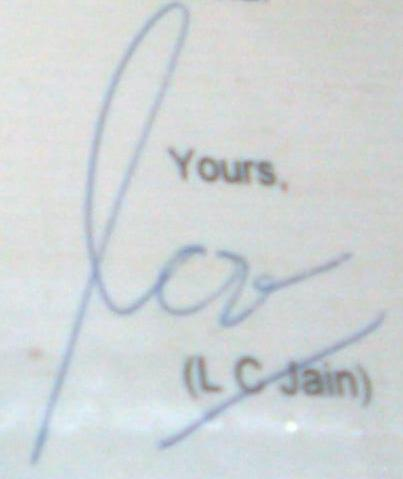

Lakshmi Chand Jain (1925–2010) was a political activist and writer. Later, he served at various times as a member of the Planning Commission, as Indian High commissioner to South Africa, as a member of the World Commission on Dams (WCD) and as secretary of the Indian Cooperative Union and the All India Handicrafts Board (AIHB). His position as the ambassador was terminated as the Vajpayee Government felt that he had not defended India's position on Nuclear tests effectively in South Africa. He eventually joined the Indian National Congress. He was posthumously awarded Padma Vibhushan, the second highest civilian award, by the UPA government. However his family declined to accept the award, saying that Jain was against accepting State Honours.

== Biography ==
While yet in his youth, Jain took part in the Quit India movement (1942). During the partition of India (1947), he was put in charge of the refugee camp at Kingsway Camp in North Delhi. He helped introduce cooperative societies for farming and cottage industries into rehabilitation camps. As a volunteer organiser with the Indian Cooperative Union (ICU), he joined the rehabilitation project for refugees from Pakistan located in Faridabad, 20 km from Delhi.

Jain later helped Kamaladevi Chattopadhyay organise the Indian Cooperative Union and applied its principles to the handicrafts industry. As secretary of the All-India Handicrafts Board, he fostered decentralised production and directed training, technical services, and loans to India's struggling self-employed spinners, weavers, carpenters, and metalsmiths. He applied modern marketing techniques to promote handicraft sales abroad and organised the Central Cottage Industries Emporium to expand the market at home. He championed artisans against mechanisation and mass production, helping millions of independent craftsmen carry on traditional livelihoods in security and pride and assured the survival of precious arts and skills.

In 1966 he led the establishment of a chain of consumer cooperative stores where those living in cities could buy food, clothing, and tools at a fair price. In 1968 he co-founded a service-oriented consulting firm.

Jain worked with and on a number of development agencies as well as government committees and boards, such as the World Commission on Dams As part of the ICU, he helped set up the Central Cottage Industries Emporium and Super Bazaar cooperative stores.

Jain's wife was the economist Devaki Jain; the couple had two sons and settled in Bangalore. His son Sreenivasan Jain is a news anchor, journalist, and currently managing editor with NDTV. In 1989, Jain received the Ramon Magsaysay Award for Public Service, for "his informed and selfless commitment to attack India's poverty at the grass-roots level".

== Awards ==
In 2011, he was chosen posthumously for the civilian award Padma Vibhushan by the Government of India, but the family declined to accept the award since he had been against the concept of state honours.

== Controversies ==
During his stint as the Indian High Commissioner to South Africa, the Indian Government headed by Atal Bihari Vajpayee conducted nuclear tests in Pokhran. LC Jain, who had been appointed by the IK Gujral government, was recalled by the PM Atal Bihari Vajpayee government in 1998. National Security Advisor Brajesh Mishra was reportedly of the opinion that Jain had not effectively defended India's decision to conduct the Pokhran II tests. Reporters like KP Nayar argued that Jain was against the idea and had communicated this to the South African government. After the Pakistani High Commissioner claimed the tests were a major threat to Pakistan, Jain was asked how he, reacted to the tests.

Jain replied that, “nobody in the world can be comfortable with a nuclear device.” According to him, it was this statement that earned the ire of Mishra, who felt he shouldn't have said this and so asked for him to be recalled.

In December 2017, Rajiv Mantri made a charge against Jain calling him a certifiable traitor in one of his articles on the basis of his support to South Africa's opposition to nuclear tests by India at the NAM summit, later that year. In response to this Jain's son, reporter Sreenivasan Jain sent a defamation notice to Mantri.

== Publications ==
- "Development of Decentralized Industries in India—Progress and Perspectives." Gandhi Marg. 2, no. 6 (September 1980): 307–29.
- "Obituary: Kamaladevi." Economic and Political Weekly, 26 November 1988, 2520–21.
- "Poverty, Environment, Development: A View from Gandhi's Window." Economic and Political Weekly, 13 February 1988, 311–20.
- Power to the People: Decentralization Is a Necessity. Policy Issue no.1. Hyderabad: Academy of Gandhian Studies, 1980.
- "A tale of Two Programmes: The Mahatma's and Mrs. Gandhi's." Times of India, 26 November 1983.
- (with B. V. Krishnamurthy and P. M. Tripathi) Grass without Roots: Rural Development under Government Auspices. New Delhi: Sage Publications, 1985.
