= M. A. Sreenivasan =

Indian politician

M. A. Sreenivasan (1897–1998) was a minister in the Princely State of Mysore and was also Dewan of Gwalior, India.

He was a Member of the Constituent Assembly representing the erstwhile Princely State of Gwalior during 1947–1948. He had an illustrious career in the Civil Service in the then State of Mysore. He served as Mysore's Trade Commissioner in London. During the Second World War, he also held offices of Controller of Supplies and Controller of Purchases in the Government of India.

Sreenivasan became a Minister in Princely State of Mysore under Dewan Sir M. Madhava Rao and handled portfolios of Industries, Agriculture and Food and Civil Supplies during 1943–1946. He then became Dewan of the Princely State of Gwalior under Maharaja Jivaji Rao Scindia during the crucial days of accession to the Indian Union.

Sreenivasan was the first Indian Chairman of the John Taylor Company which was mining gold at Kolar Gold Fields. He authored a book titled Labour in India: Socio-Economic Conditions of Workers in the Kolar Gold Mines. He also served as Chairman of Consolidated Coffee Limited and Coffee Lands and Industries. He was a Director of Air India, Buckingham and Carnatic Mills and other companies.

He founded the University of Agricultural Science, at Hebbal. His autobiography is titled 'Of the Raj, Maharajas and Me'.

Sreenivasan was the founder President of the Greater Mysore Chamber of Commerce and Industry.

He died on 15 January 1998 at Bangalore, Karnataka at the age of hundred and one years.

== Family ==
His son, the late M. A. Partha Sarathy was a former Chairman of the Bangalore Urban Arts Commission.

His daughter, Devaki Jain is an Indian economist known for her work on Development. One of his grandsons is Sreenivasan Jain, the former managing editor of NDTV, who is one of two sons of Devaki Jain.
