= Truth vs Hype =

Indian news TV series

- The title logo of the series
- Presented by: Sreenivasan Jain
- Theme music composer: Adarsh TG
- Country of origin: India
- Original language: English

Production
- Producer: Ambika Varma
- Editor: Bala
- Running time: ~25 minutes

Original release
- Network: New Delhi Television 24x7
- Release: 10 September 2011 – present

Truth vs Hype is an Indian weekly current affairs programme produced by Ambika Varma and presented by Sreenivasan Jain in the English news channel New Delhi Television 24x7 (NDTV 24x7). In most episodes, Jain travels to various parts of India to discuss a major news story of the week, with help of additional inputs from New Delhi Television correspondents. The program, launched in September 2011, was praised for breaking away from the stereotypical Indian format of "talking-heads" discussion on prime time news television.

Jain won the prestigious Ramnath Goenka Award for "Journalist of the Year (2012)" for Truth vs Hype. "In a world pre-occupied with breaking news and centred around studio rooms, Sreenivasan Jain’s show Truth vs Hype aimed at bringing stories straight from the field. From covering the aftermath of the revolution in Egypt to investigating the riots in Assam, from exposing the nexus between miners, real-estate players and politicians in Goa to a series on the coal scam, the show kept its focus on hard news", The Indian Express wrote. "From reporting from the grassroots, it evolved into an investigative show which had a combination of ground reports, investigation, and political and socio-economic issues," Jain says.

Schedule: Saturday 21.30 IST (Sunday 14.30 IST) for 20–25 minutes
