= I. K. K. Menon =

Indian Malayalam-language writer

- Born: 9 December 1919; Trichur, Kingdom of Cochin
- Died: 12 January 2011 (aged 91); New Delhi, India
- Occupation: Writer

Ittyanath Kunjikrishna Menon (9 December 1919 – 12 January 2011), better known as I. K. K. Menon or I. K. K. M., was a Malayalam language writer from Kerala, India. He also served as Secretary to the Election Commission of India (ECI).

== Life ==
Menon was born on 9 December 1919 in Thrissur was a member of Ittyanath family, Villadom, Thrissur. Menon was educated in Thrissur and erstwhile Madras. He went to Delhi in 1945 and joined government of India service as an officer at the Constituent Assembly Secretariat. He retired as Secretary to the Election Commission of India in 1977.

Menon wrote 150 articles, 175 short stories, five short story collections, novels, stories for children, and biographies in English and Malayalam. His works include Meghangalkidayil Mayil, Nigoodaniswanangal, IKKMinte Kathakal, Wild Flur, Palayanam, Kunjhalimarakkar, Folk Tales of Kerala, Story of Ayurveda, Parakkunna Raniyum Koottukarum, and biographies of Appu Nedungadi, Cartoonist Shankar and Sultana Razia.

Menon won the Kerala Sahitya Akademi Award in 2003.

I.K.K. Menon was married to Chaenkalath Leela. Their daughter Visalakshi Menon was Associate Professor of history at Jesus and Mary College Delhi University.

Menon died on 12 January 2011, at his residence in New Delhi.
