= Nedungad =

- Island
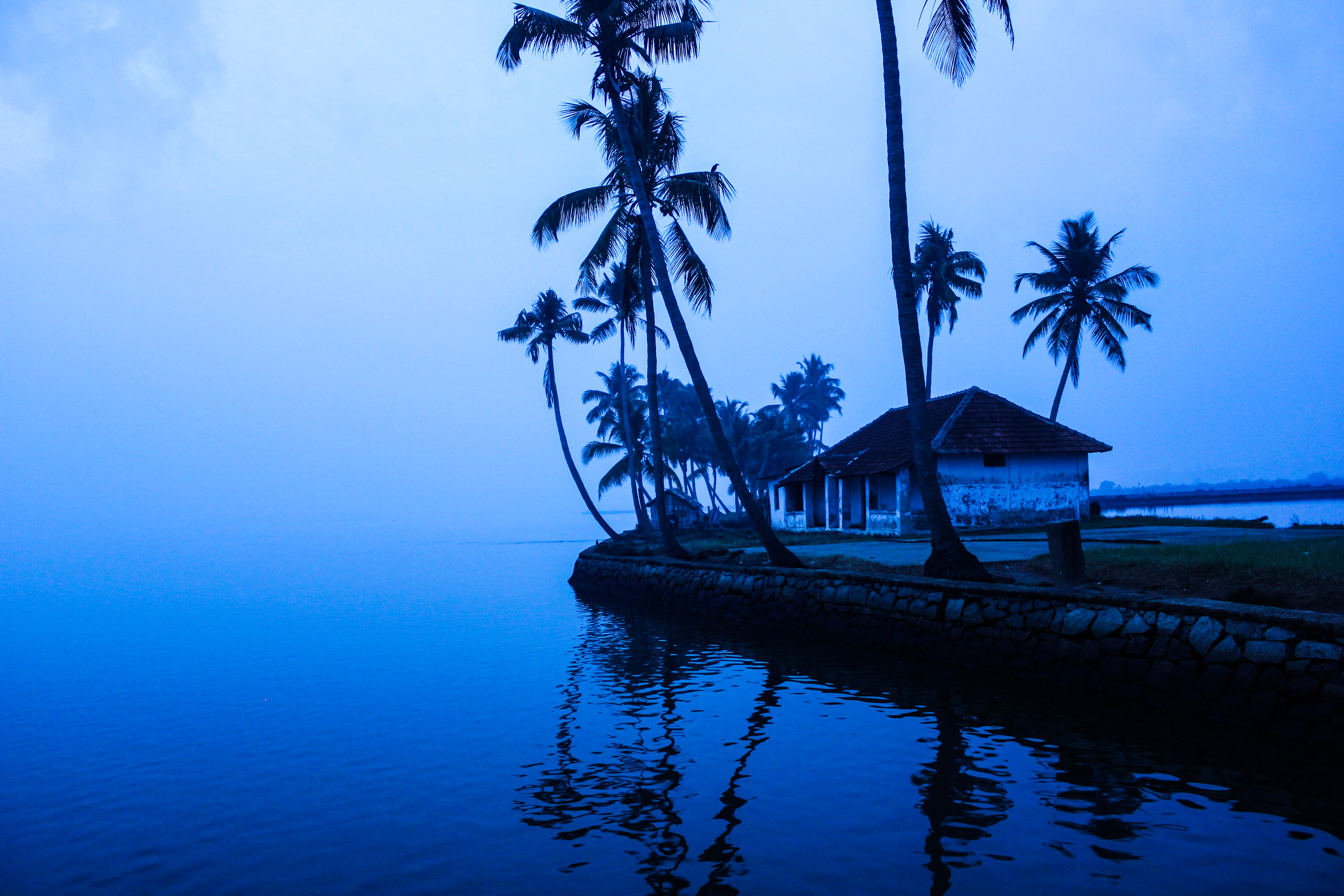

- Location in Kerala, India
- Coordinates: 10.063637°N 76.225773°E
- Country: India
- State: Kerala
- District: Ernakulam

Government
  - Body: Nayarambalam Grama panchayat.

Population
  - Total: 20,000

Languages
  - Official: Malayalam, English
- Time zone: UTC+5:30 (IST)
- PIN: 682509
- Vehicle registration: KL-
- Coastline: 10 kilometres (6.2 mi)
- Nearest city: Kochi
- Literacy: 100%
- Lok Sabha constituency: Ernakulam
- Civic agency: Cochin Corporation
- Climate: Tropical monsoon (Köppen)
- Avg. summer temperature: 35 °C (95 °F)
- Avg. winter temperature: 20 °C (68 °F)

Not to be confused with Nedungadu

Nedungad is a small island located in the Ernakulam district of Kerala state, in southern India. It is located in the east side of Nayarambalam.
