= Ranganathananda =

Hindu swami of the Ramakrishna Math order

Swami Ranganathananda
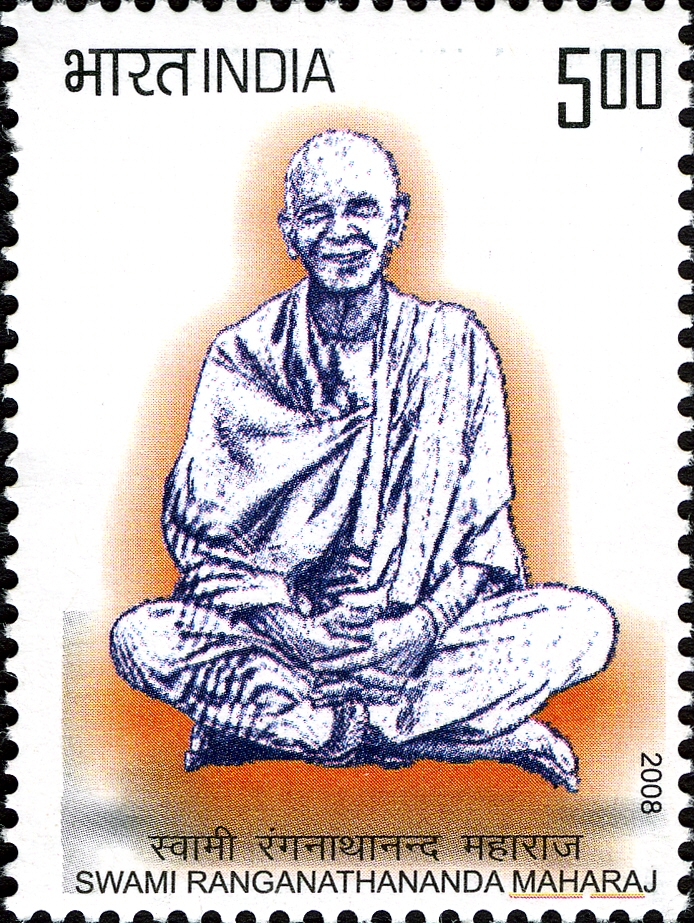
- Ranganathananda on a 2008 Indian stamp

Personal life
- Born: Shankaran Kutty; 15 December 1908 Trichur, Kerala, British India
- Died: 25 April 2005 (aged 96) Woodlands Medical Centre, Kolkata, West Bengal, India

Religious life
- Religion: Hinduism
- Philosophy: Vedanta

Religious career
- Teacher: Shivananda
- Predecessor: Swami Bhuteshananda
- Successor: Swami Gahanananda

Swami Ranganathananda (15 December 1908 – 25 April 2005) was a Hindu swami of the Ramakrishna Math order. He served as the 13th president of the Ramakrishna Math and Ramakrishna Mission.

== Biography ==
Swami Ranganathananda, (pre-monastic name Shankaran Kutty), was born on 15 December 1908 in a village called Trikkur near Trichur, in Kerala to Neelakanta Sastry and Lakshmikutty Amma. As a teenager, he was attracted by the teachings of Swami Vivekananda and Ramakrishna and joined the Mysore centre of Ramakrishna Order as a Brahmachari in 1926. He served the Mysore Centre for 9 years and was under Swami Siddheswarananda and another 3 years under him in the Bangalore centre. He was initiated as a Sannyasi (monk) in 1933, on the 70th anniversary of Vivekananda's birth by Shivananda, a direct disciple of Ramakrishna. Between 1939 and 1942, he served as the secretary and librarian at the Rangoon branch of Ramakrishna Mission. In 1942, during the Second World War, when Japan bombed Burma (Myanmar today) and the centre had to be wound up, Swami Ranganathananda came back to Dhaka preferring the land route trekking along with thousands of other refugees, although more comfortable alternatives were available.

He then served as the president of the Karachi centre of Math from 1942 to 1948 until the partition of India, after which the mission found it difficult to continue its activities at Karachi. At Karachi, L.K. Advani came in contact with him and listened to his discourses on the Bhagavad Gita. Advani said that Ranganathananda was a "great influence" during his formative years. According to Advani, at Karachi, Mohammed Ali Jinnah had once listened to Swami Ranganathananda's lecture on Islam and Prophet Mohammed and remarked, "Now I know how a true Muslim should be."

From 1949 to 1962, he served as a secretary at the Delhi centre. Then from 1962 to 1967, he served as the Secretary of the Ramakrishna Mission Institute of Culture, Kolkata, director of School of Humanistic & Cultural studies, editor of mission's monthly. The swami became president of the Hyderabad branch in 1973, where he developed the Vivekananda Vani School of Languages, a temple, and a library. He was elected to the post of vice-president of Ramakrishna Math and Mission in 1988. In 1998 he was elected as the president of the mission.

Swami Ranganathananda was chosen by the Indian government for Padma Vibhushan award in 2000. He declined the Padma Vibhushan as it was conferred on him in his individual capacity and not for the Mission. He accepted the Indira Gandhi Award for National Integration in 1987 and the Gandhi Peace Prize in February 1999 as both were conferred on the Ramakrishna Mission.

Since his residence in Bangalore in the 1930s, Swami Ranganathananda has been a popular teacher and lecturer on Indian spiritual culture. By the mid-1950s he was known within India as an authority on practical Vedanta. Since the 1960s he made nearly annual lecture tours to Western Europe, the United States, Australia, and Singapore. He also lectured in Iran and in the Soviet Union. Ranganathananda is noted for this contributions that bridges science and Vedantic spirituality.

Swami Ranganathananda was regarded a great scholar and teacher. He has authored over 50 books. The Bharatiya Vidya Bhavan has published around twenty-nine of these books. His famous book includes Eternal Values for a Changing Society and commentaries on the messages of the Bhagavad Gita and Upanishads. He was known as a good orator. His weekly classes and public lectures were popular among the followers. Ganapathy, a correspondent of The Hindu writes that "In all his lectures, Swami Ranganathananda had stressed on the philosophy of eternal religion, a practical Vedanta, which teaches universal acceptance". He conducted moral and religious classes for the prisoners in the Bangalore and Mysore jails. In Delhi, Ranganathananda organised social services at hospitals and worked for the relief of leprosy patients. Indian prime minister, Manmohan Singh described Swamis Ranganathananda and Vivekananda as "leaders with a modern mind and scientific temper."

Swami Ranganathananda lived the last days of his life in the headquarters of the Ramakrishna Mission at Belur in West Bengal. He died at the Woodlands Medical Centre, Kolkata, at 3:51 p.m. on Monday, 25 April 2005, owing to cardiac arrest. He was 96. His body was kept for darshan at Belur Math (near Kolkata) on that day, then was cremated the next day. India Post released a postage stamp in the denomination of Rs 5 to commemorate the 100th birth anniversary of Swami Ranganathananda, during December 2008 at Kolkata.

His life and work has been documented in many biographies, including the one in Malayalam by D. Vijayamohan.

== Quotations ==
- "Are you growing spiritually? Can you love others? Can you feel oneness with others? Have you peace within yourself? and do you radiate it around you? That is called spiritual growth, which is stimulated by meditation inwardly, and by work done in a spirit of service outwardly."
- "I am not alone in the world. . .We belong to a world. . .The vast world is around us. We cannot do without it. We cannot become human without a human world around us. How much we owe to the world of other human beings around us!"
- "Efficiency and energy comes from emotion, not from intellectual knowledge, which can only direct that emotional energy. But the real impulse comes from emotion. It makes you work at your best."
- "So, work hard; perform all duties; develop yourself; then come and surrender to the highest. Do a whole day's honest work, then sit and meditate; then resign yourself to God. Otherwise, that meditation has no meaning or value. Meditation at the end of a lazy day has no meaning; but the same at the end of an active day, filled with good deeds, has meaning, and is rewarding."
- "How can we find joy in work? By working for oneself? No; it is not possible to find that continuous joy in work through selfish motivations. Frustration and ennui are the end of all selfish motivations. Frustrations and nervous breakdowns are the end of a self-centred life. The first advice of modern psychiatry to such people is to get out of this prison of self-centredness, and to find a genuine interest in other people. Everyone has to learn the lesson some day that, the best way to be happy is to strive to make others happy. So wherever you find frustration, you will always discover that the person concerned had been too self-centred, and the only hope for him is through learning to take interest in other people, to find joy in the joy of other people. This is the royal path that makes for health, for strength, for efficiency. This great truth—universal and human—we should apply to the world and to our life in it."
- The great new mantra today is "Work" and 'Hard Work'; along with Hard Work, intelligent work co-operative teamwork. All great undertakings are product of teamwork. We can meet the challenge of freedom only when we have learnt this character-efficiency involved in teamwork, and intelligent hard work. This is the philosophy which we have to learn consciously, not unconsciously, somehow stumbling into it.
- Work from ego point of view is all tension. But behind ego, there is an infinite spiritual dimension. When that is realised even a little, then extra work won't make one feel that it is heavy. Even ordinary experiences will tell you: Whenever there is love in the heart, the worker doesn't feel heavy. When there is no love in the heart, even a little work makes one feel very heavy. As soon as you have love for a particular cause, you can do anything; do hard work, but have a spirit of detachment based on a larger love.
- Work is no work at all. It is a question of agency and attachment. When these two are not there, work ceases to be work, it becomes a play, it becomes spontaneous, and it becomes natural. When you become thoroughly detached, then all that tension goes away. You are working, but you don't feel that you are working. What a beautiful idea!"
- Work is drudgery; Sri Krishna will not allow that attitude. There is joy in work also. Do not abandon work; go on doing work; but, mentally renouncing all actions. It is a wonderful state of mind-working, and yet not working.
- Those who work, work with a zest and with joy and in work, learn calmness and the serenity of the human mind and heart; what a wonderful joy it is to work in such a way!
- When science insists on studying things from the point of view of the objects themselves by eliminating the personal equation, it is in effect, emphasising the sakshi-bhava or sakshi point of view (witness attitude); for, the limited and circumscribed vision of the ego gives place to the unlimited and universal vision of the sakshi, by the practice of scientific or intellectual detachment.
- The endeavours and conclusions of the sense-bound intellect can not be the last word in man’s search for truth. An intellectual approach to truth will end only in agnosticism; and often in cynicism. But the whole being of man seeks to experience truth, to realise it. … This rising above rationalism to direct experience and realisation, this growth of man from the sensate to the super-sensual dimension, is the special message of Indian spiritual tradition.
- Mysticism, studied seriously, challenges basic tenets of Western Cultures: a) the primacy of reason and intellect; b) the separate, individual nature of man; c) the linear organisation of time. Great mystics, like our own great scientists, envision the world as being larger than those tenets, as transcending our traditional views.

== Bibliography ==
- Ranganathananda; Elva Linnéa Nelson (1991). Human being in depth: a scientific approach to religion. SUNY Press. p. 159. ISBN 978-0-7914-0679-3.
- Ranganathananda, Swami (1971). Eternal Values for a Changing Society (Vol- I to IV). Bharatiya Vidya Bhavan.
- Ranganathananda, Swami (1971). The message of Upanishads. Bharatiya Vidya Bhavan. ASIN B000GSMRE8.
- Ranganathananda, Swami (1974). A pilgrim looks at the World (Vol. I & II). Bombay: Bharatiya Vidya Bhavan. ISBN 978-0-85655-463-6.
- Ranganathananda, Swami (1990). Swami Vivekananda and Human Excellence. Advaita Ashrama. ASIN B000KB3U2E.
- Ranganathananda, Swami (1991). Vivekananda : his Humanism. Advaita Ashrama. ASIN B001JJGEOM.
- Ranganathananda, Swami (1978). Science and Religion. Calcutta: Advaita Ashrama. p. 245. ISBN 978-0-7025-0062-6.
- Ranganathananda, Swami (2004). The essence of Indian Culture. Advaita Ashrama. ISBN 978-81-85301-17-4.
- Ranganathananda, Swami (1997). An introduction to the study of Gita. Advaita Ashrama. ISBN 978-81-85301-11-2.
- Ranganathananda, Swami. The charm and power of the Upanishads.
- Ranganathananda, Swami. Bhagawan Buddha and our heritage.
- Ranganathananda, Swami (1969). The Christ we adore. Ramakrishna Mission Inst. of Culture. ISBN 978-0-7025-0159-3.
- Ranganathananda, Swami (1996). Practical Vedanta and the Science of values. Advaita Ashrama. ISBN 978-81-7505-052-5.
- Ranganathananda, Swami. The Indian vision of God as Mother.
- Ranganathananda, Swami (2004). Essence of Indian Culture. Advaita Ashrama. ISBN 978-81-85301-17-4.
- Ranganathananda, Swami (1998). The approach to Truth in Vedanta. Advaita Ashrama. adin: B000CKEQHQ.
- Ranganathananda, Swami (1996). Democratic administration in the light of Practical Vedanta. Chennai: Sri Ramakrishna Math. p. 277. ISBN 978-81-7120-724-4.
- Ranganathananda, Swami (2000). Universal message of Bhagavad Gita (vol I to III). Advaita Ashrama. ISBN 978-81-7505-213-0.
- Ranganathananda, Swami (2005). Message of the Brihadaranyaka Upanishad. Advaita Ashrama. p. 740. ISBN 978-81-7505-267-3.
