= P. Parameswaran =

Indian philosopher (1927–2020)

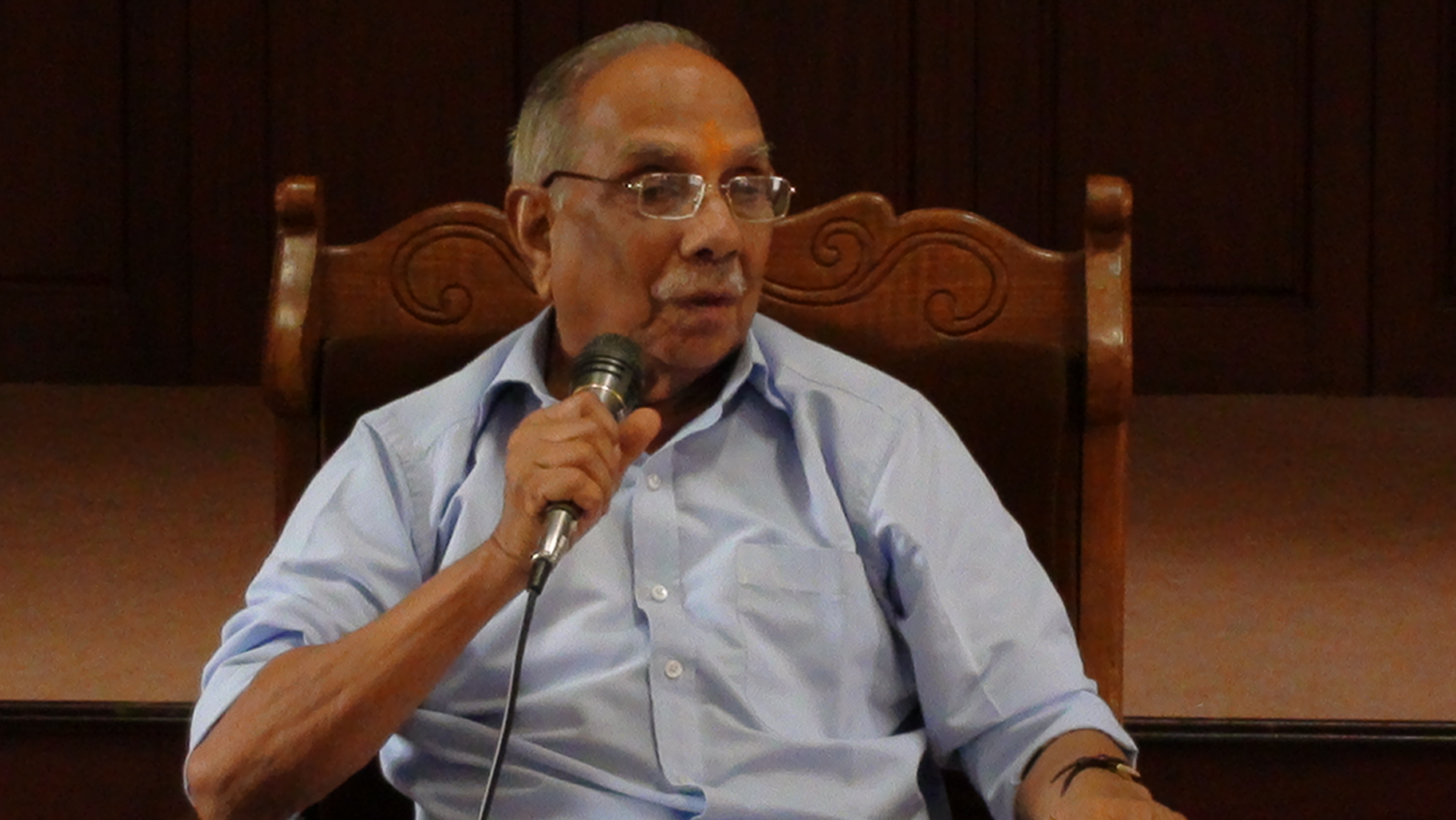
- Born: 3 October 1927; Thamarasseril Illam, Cherthala, Kerala, India
- Died: 9 February 2020 (aged 92); Mayannur, Kerala, India
- Citizenship: Indian
- Education: B.A. History, University College Trivandrum; Predegree, St. Berchmans College Changanacherry
- Known for: Hindutva thinker Rashtriya Swayamsevak Sangh Pracharak director of Bharatiya Vichara Kendra president of Vivekananda Kendra
- Awards: Padma Vibhushan 2018; Padma Shri 2004; Amritha Keerti Puraskar 2002
- Website: http://www.vicharakendram.org/index.htm

P. Parameswaran (3 October 1927 – 9 February 2020), often referred to as Parameswarji, was a Rashtriya Swayamsevak Sangh (RSS) pracharak from Kerala, India who was erstwhile Vice‑President of the Jan Sangh.

He was president of Vivekananda Kendra, (which was awarded the 2015 Gandhi Peace Prize) and has been conferred with Padma Vibhushan, India's second highest civilian award, in 2018. He died on 9 February 2020 due to age-related illnesses

== Childhood ==
Born in Thamarasseril Illam, Muhamma village in Alappuzha district in the year 1927, Parameswaran after his schooling at his birthplace, continued his studies at St. Berchmans College, Changanacherry and graduated from University College, Thiruvananthapuram with distinctions in BA (Hons.) in History. From early childhood, he had a great inclination towards the study of Hinduism. He was intimately connected with most of the Hindu social and cultural organizations.

== Ideology ==
He came into contact with the Rashtriya Swayamsevak Sangh (RSS) during his student days. He was also a disciple of Swami Agamananda. Parameswaran became an RSS pracharak (full-time organizer) in 1950, as per the direction of M. S. Golwalkar (Guruji), who was the Sarsanghchalak of RSS. He served as organizing secretary of Bharatiya Jana Sangh in 1957. In 1968, he became an All‑India General Secretary and later Vice‑President of the Jan Sangh. He was jailed during the Indian Emergency (1975-1977). In 1977, Parameswaran moved from politics to the sphere of social thought and development. He worked as director based in New Delhi for Deendayal Research Institute an organisation started by Nanaji Deshmukh for four years. P. Parameswaran, a bachelor, who didn't have a house of his own, was residing in the Vichara Kendram headquarters, Thiruvananthapuram.

In 1982, he came back to Kerala and gave shape to a new organization; Bharatheeya Vichara Kendram aimed at national reconstruction through study and research. It has its headquarters in Thiruvananthapuram and has units all over the state. He was the Director of Bharatheeya Vichara Kendram. He has also been associated with the Vivekananda Rock Memorial and Vivekananda Kendra, Kanyakumari and has served in various capacities in the governing body of the Kendra. He was the patron of Geetha Swadhyaya Samithi, which promotes the ideology of Bhagawad Geetha amongst youth.

He took initiation from Ramakrishna Mission and was a close associate and disciple of Swami Agamananda social reformer and founder of Advaita Ashrama at Kalady, the birthplace of Adi Shankara.

He has written articles and books on social, cultural and religious themes. He has delivered lectures all over the country on national issues. He participated in the Centenary celebrations of Swami Vivekananda's address at the World Parliament of Religions held at Chicago in [1893].

== Social thought ==
In 1998, as an answer to the rising crime rate, delinquency and other social evils in Kerala, Sri. Parameswaran proposed observation of a 'Gita decade'. Popularizing the Bhagavad Gita as a comprehensive life science was his solution to the social problems of Kerala and the whole of India. The recently conducted two‑day Gita Sangamam at Thrissur attracted around two thousand youths from all over Kerala. Eminent personalities like Padma Subrahmanyam, Justice Sukumaran etc. attended the function, which was formally inaugurated by Ananth Kumar, Union Minister for Culture, Youth Affairs and Sports. The programme of conducting one Gita Shibir in each panchayat of Kerala is on.

The International Seminar 'Bhagavad-Gita Gita and Modern problems' held at Thiruvananthapuram from 7 to 4 December 2000, in which 1500 youths, scholars and saints from all over India and abroad including Murli Manohar Joshi, Union HRD Minister and the Dalai Lama participated, was a high-water mark of the Gita Movement organized by the Gita Swadhaya Samithi under the guidance of P. Parameswaran.

== Awards and recognition ==
Parameswaran was awarded the Hanuman Prasad Poddar Award instituted by Bada Bazar Library of Kolkata Calcutta in 1997, in recognition of his effort in teaching the lofty principles of Hinduism to the common man.

Parameswaran has won many awards and recognitions. He was appointed as the member of the Court (Senate) of Jawaharlal Nehru University, New Delhi in 2000.

He was awarded the Amrita Keerti Puraskar by Sri Mata Amritanandamayi Math on 26 September 2002, for outstanding service to the society. In 2004, the President of India awarded him the Padma Shri in recognition of his valuable contributions to the society. He has authored many books in Malayalam and English.

P. Parameswaran has authored several books on Indian philosophy and society. He was the editor of the magazines ‑ Kesari (magazine) and 'Manthan'. He was the editor of the monthly 'Yuva Bharathi' and the quarterly 'Vivekananda Kendra Patrilka'. He has written books on Sri Aurobindo, Marx and Vivekananda, Chhatrapati Shivaji, and Swami Vivekananda's teachings. He also kept his close association with Sri Ramakrishna Math and Advaita Ashram, Kalady. He was also the recipient of Padma Vibhushan 2018.

- 2004 - Padma Shri
- 2018 - Padma Vibhushan
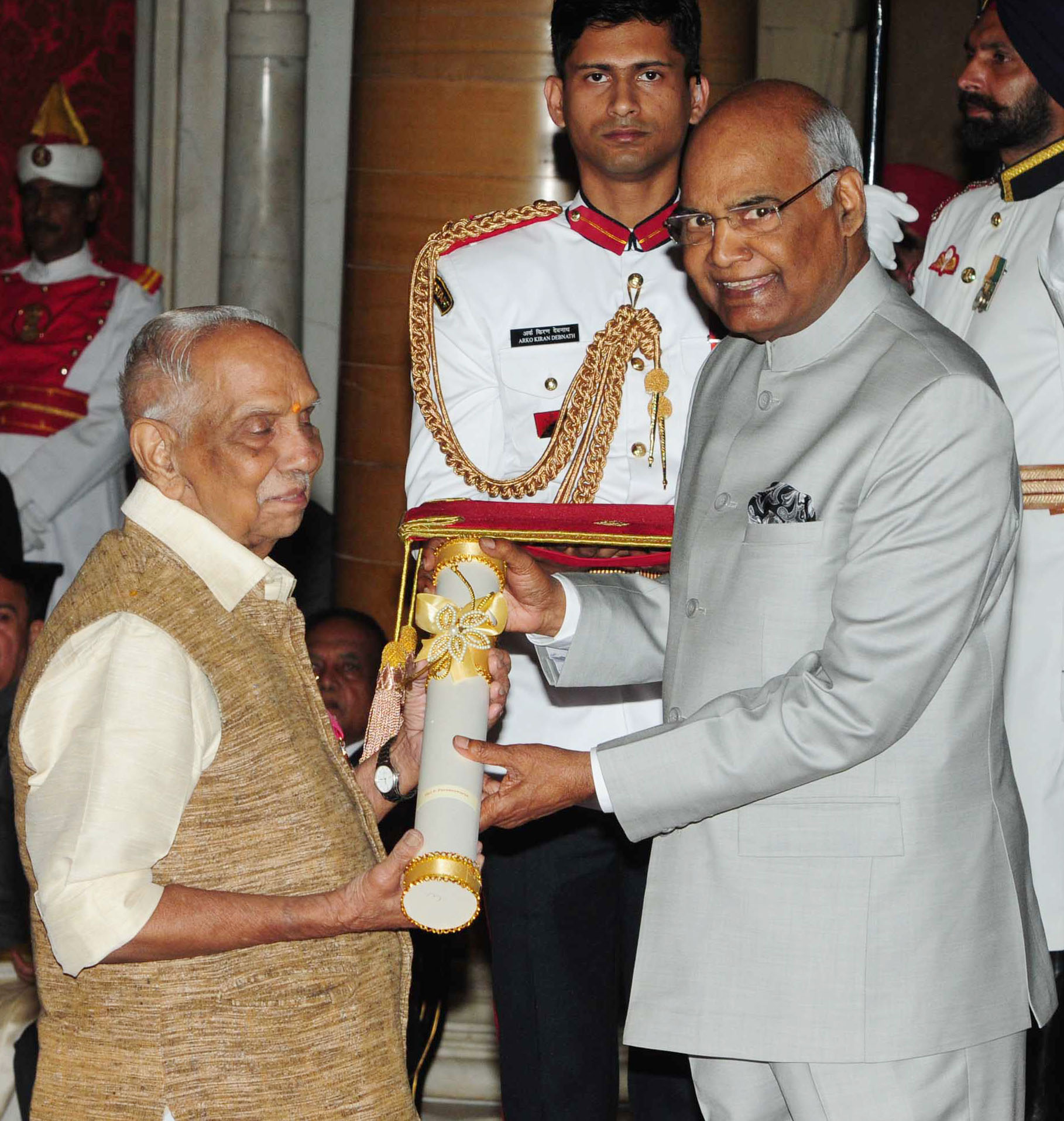
  The President of India Shri Ram Nath Kovind presenting the Padma Vibhushan Award to Shri P. Parameswaran

== Works ==
Sri. Parameswaran has authored several books on Indian philosophy and society. He was the editor of journals‑ 'Kesari (magazine)' and 'Manthan'. He was the editor of the monthly 'Yuva Bharathy' and the quarterly Vivekananda Kendra Patrilka and Chief Editor of 'Pragati' Quarterly Research Journal.

Books by him include:

1. Sri Narayana Guru the Prophet of Renaissance.
2. Sri Aravindan Bhaviyude Darsanikan.
3. Vishwa Vijayi Vivekanandan.
4. Marx and Vivekananda.
5. From Marx to Maharshi.
6. Bhagavad Gita – Vision of a New World Order.
7. Beyond All Isms to Humanism.
8. Heart Beats of a Hindu Nation (Compilation of selected editorials in Yuva Bharathy).
9. Yajna Prasadam (Selected Poems).
10. Disabodhathinate Darshanam (Selected Essays in Malayalam).
11. Bhagavad-Gita The Nectar of Immortality (Collection of Essays on Gita).
12. Marunna Samoohavum Maratha Mulyangalum.
13. Gita's Vision Of An Ideal Society
14. Udharedathmanathmanam
15. Makarajyotis(A brief study of Swami Vivekananda in Malayalam)
16. Darshanasamvadam
17. Swanthantra Bharatham-Gatiyum Niyathiyum
18. Hindudarmavum Indian communisavum
19. Vivekanandanum Prabhudha Keralavum (Edited)
20. Hindutva Ideology – Unique and Universal
21. Heart Beats of Hindu Nation (3 volumes)

== See also ==
- David Frawley
- Koenraad Elst
- Michel Danino
- Alain Danielou
- Girilal Jain
- Vivekananda Kendra
- Vivekananda Rock Memorial
