= Sharad Anantrao Joshi =

Indian politician

- Born: 3 September 1935; Satara, India
- Died: 12 December 2015 (aged 80)
- Occupations: Politician, Writer, Bureaucrat
- Known for: Shetkari Sanghatana (Farmers organisation)

Sharad Anantrao Joshi (3 September 1935 – 12 December 2015) was an Indian politician, who founded the Swatantra Bharat Paksh party and Shetkari Sanghatana (farmers' Organisation). He was also a Member of the Parliament of India representing Maharashtra in the Rajya Sabha, the upper house of the Indian Parliament from 5 July 2004 to 4 July 2010. On 9 January 2010 he was the sole MP in Rajya Sabha to vote against the bill providing 33% reservation for women in Indian parliament and assemblies.

Joshi was a member of Advisory Board of the World Agriculture Forum (WAF), the foremost global agricultural platform that initiates dialogue between those who can impact agriculture. Shetakari Sanghatana is a non-political union of Farmers formed with the aim to “Freedom of access to markets and to Technology”.

== Early life, education, and career ==
Sharad Joshi was born on 3 September 1935 at Satara, in the state of Maharashtra, India to Anant Narayan (1905–70) and Indirabai Joshi (1910–92). He obtained a master's degree in Commerce from Sydenham College, Mumbai, in 1957 and Diploma in Informatics from Lausanne in 1974. During his career he obtained many awards including Award C.E. Randle Gold Medal for Banking (1955), and Cursetjee Dady Prize for work on Computation of Irrigation Benefits. He worked as a Lecturer in Economics and Statistics, University of Poona, 1957–58. Later he worked for the Indian Postal Service (Class I) 1958–68. His international career included a long stint as Chief of Informatics Service at International Bureau, Universal Postal Union at Bern in Switzerland from 1968 to 77. He served as a United Nations officer before founding Shetakari Sanghatana.

== Farmer's issues ==
Joshi was a founder of Shetkari Sanghatana (Farmers' Organisation) in Maharashtra. He led number of mass agitations on agricultural issues in India. Most of them in the state of Maharashtra on issues of prices offered to Farmers. He was also founder Leader of the 'Kisan Coordination Committee (KCC)' composed of sister organisations from 14 states – Maharashtra, Karnataka, Gujarat, Rajasthan, Punjab, Haryana, Himachal Pradesh, Madhya Pradesh, Bihar, Uttar Pradesh, Orissa, Andhra Pradesh, Tamil Nadu, Kerala. The KCC led a number of agitations in Maharashtra, Karnataka, Gujarat, Punjab, Haryana, and other states for remunerative prices of onions, sugar cane, tobacco, milk, paddy, cotton, against hike in electricity tariffs, for liquidation of rural debts, and against State dumping in the domestic markets. He lost Maharashtra Legislative Assembly election to Ashok Shinde of Shivsena from Hinganghat constituency in 1995.

Joshi was an economic liberal who demanded reduction of state control in agriculture sector. He supported the WTO as he believed Indian farmers could benefit if they had access to the global market. Joshi is credited with coining the term Bharat v. India to highlight the neglect of rural farmers by urban elites.

In his will, Joshi left most of his estate to the Shetkari Trust, which is entrusted to take his work forward. He had been a columnist for the dailies 'The Times of India', 'Business India', and 'Lokmat' and also authored books on agricultural issues.

== Shetkari Mahila Aghadi (SMA) ==
Sharad Joshi was also a founder of the largest organisation of rural women Shetkari Mahila Aghadi (SMA) celebrated for its work for women's property rights, notably for the Lakshmi Mukti programme that has conferred land titles on lakhs of rural housewives. In 1986, Chandwad village of Nashik District in Maharashtra was witness to a gathering of over two lakh peasant women.

== Special Economic Zones for farm ==
Sharad Joshi advocated SEZs in areas of India's comparative advantage, notably organic farming, aromatic and medicinal plants, manufacturing of hybrid seeds and horticulture. Joshi also voiced on the need to establish credible certifying agencies for organic farm products. He suggested exclusive Zones for growing variety of onions popular in the Western countries, so the domestic market could be insulated from the international markets, and shortages could be averted without negative implications for foreign exchange.

== Socialism and Indian Constitution ==
In December 2005 Sharad Joshi tabled private member legislation in the Rajya Sabha, demanding deletion of the word socialism from the Representation of the People Act, 1951. As the Act was passed by the Constituent Assembly itself, it is regarded as a part of the Indian Constitution. The word "Socialism" did not exist in the Indian Constitution prior to the Forty-second Amendment of the Constitution of India by Indira Gandhi during the Emergency. The amendment changed the Preamble to the Constitution and replaced "Sovereign Democratic Republic" with "Sovereign Socialist Secular Democratic Republic".

== Publications ==
A partial list of his writings and works includes:

English

- Organisation of Peasants: Thought and Practice
- Bharat Speaks Out (1982)
- Bharat Eyeview (1986)
- The Women's Question (1986),
- Answering Before God (1994)

Marathi

- AngarMala (अंगारमळा)
- Anwayarth Part 1 (अन्वयार्थ - १)
- Anwayarth Part 2 (अन्वयार्थ – २)
- Arth To Sangato Punha (अर्थ तो सांगतो पुन्हा)]
- Khulya Vyavasthekade - Khulya Manane (खुल्या व्यवस्थेकडे खुल्या मनाने)
- Chandawadchi Shidori - Striyancha Prashn (चांदवडची शिदोरी स्त्रियांचा प्रश्न)
- Jag Badalnari Pustake (जग बदलणारी पुस्तके)
- Poshindyachi Lokshahi (पोशिंद्याची लोकशाही)
- Prachalit Arthavyvasthevar Nava Prakash (प्रचलित अर्थव्यवस्थेवर नवा प्रकाश)
- Baliche Rajya Yenar Aahe (बळीचे राज्य येणार आहे!)
- Bharatasthi ('भारता'साठी)
- Mazya Shetkari Bhavanno Aani Maybahininno
- Rakhekhalche Nikhare (राखेखालचे निखारे)
- Rashtriya Krushineetee (राष्ट्रीय कृषिनीती)
- Shetkari Sanghatana : Vichar Aani Karyapaddhatee (शेतकरी संघटना : विचार आणि कार्यपद्धती)
- Shetkaryacha Raaja Shivaji Aani Itar Lekh (शेतकऱ्यांचा राजा शिवाजी आणि इतर लेख)
- Swatantrya Ka Nasle? (स्वातंत्र्य का नासले?)

Hindi

- Samasyayen Bharat Ki (समस्याए भारत की)
- Swatantrata Kyon Naakam Hui (स्वतंत्रता क्यों नाकाम हो गई?)
