= Padma Vibhushan =

Second highest civilian award of the Republic of India

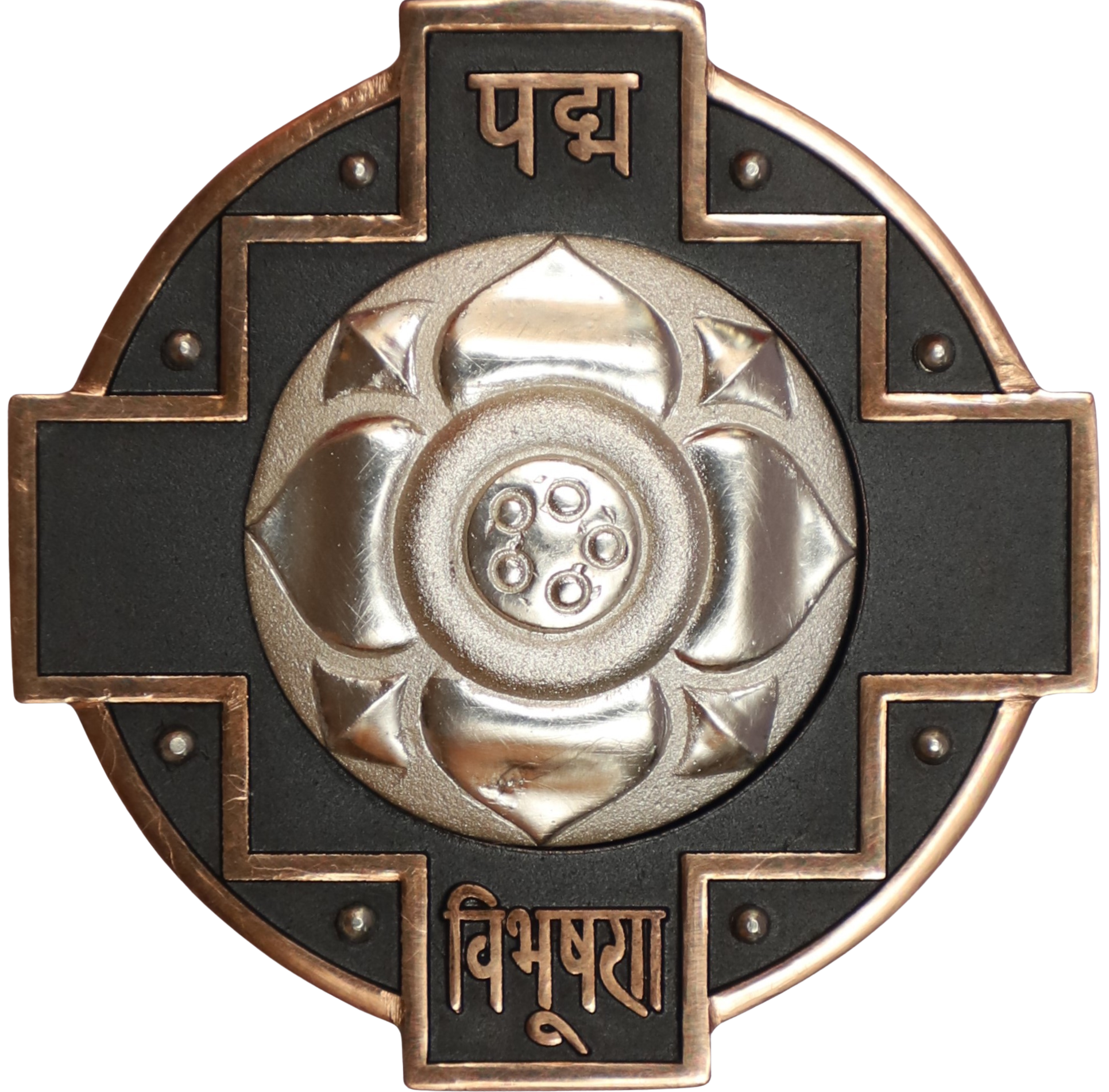
- Medallion of Padma Vibhushan
- Type: National Civilian
- Country: India
- Presented by: President of India
- Ribbon
- Obverse: A centrally located lotus flower is embossed and the text "Padma (पद्म)" written in Devanagari script is placed above and the text "Vibhushan (विभूषण)" is placed below the lotus.
- Reverse: A platinum Emblem of India placed in the centre with the national motto of India, "Satyameva Jayate" (Truth alone triumphs) in Devanagari Script
- Established: 1954; 72 years ago
- First award: 1954: Satyendra Nath Bose; Nandalal Bose; Zakir Husain; Balasaheb Gangadhar Kher; V. K. Krishna Menon; Jigme Dorji Wangchuck
- Final award: 2026: Dharmendra (posthumous); K. T. Thomas; N. Rajam; P. Narayanan; V. S. Achuthanandan (posthumous)

Highlights
- Total: 348
- Website: padmaawards.gov.in

Precedence
- Next (higher): Bharat Ratna (civilian)
- Next (lower): Padma Bhushan

The Padma Vibhushan (IAST: Padma Vibhūṣaṇa pronounced [pəd̪mə ʋɪbʱuːʂəɳə], lit. 'Lotus Grandeur') is the second-highest civilian award of the Republic of India, after the Bharat Ratna. Instituted on 2 January 1954, the award is given for "exceptional and distinguished service." All persons without distinction of race, occupation, position or sex are eligible for these awards. However, government servants including those working with public sector undertakings, except doctors and scientists, are not eligible for these Awards. As of 2024, the award has been bestowed on 336 individuals, including 31 posthumous and 21 non-citizen recipients.

During 1 May and 15 September of every year, the recommendations for the award are submitted to the Padma Awards Committee, constituted by the Prime Minister of India. The recommendations are received from all the state and union territory governments, the Ministries of the Government of India, the Bharat Ratna and previous Padma Vibhushan award recipients, the Institutes of Excellence, the Ministers, the Chief Ministers and the Governors of State, and the Members of Parliament including private individuals. The committee later submits their recommendations to the Prime Minister and the President of India for further approval. The award recipients are announced on Republic Day.

The first recipients of the award were Satyendra Nath Bose, Nand Lal Bose, Zakir Husain, Balasaheb Gangadhar Kher, Jigme Dorji Wangchuck, and V. K. Krishna Menon, who were honoured in 1954. The 1954 statutes did not allow posthumous awards, but this was subsequently modified in the January 1955 statute. The "Padma Vibhushan", along with other personal civil honours, was briefly suspended twice, from July 1977 to January 1980 and from August 1992 to December 1995. Some of the recipients have refused or returned their conferments. P. N. Haksar, Vilayat Khan, E. M. S. Namboodiripad, Swami Ranganathananda, and Manikonda Chalapathi Rau, Mata Amritanandamayi refused the award, the family members of Lakshmi Chand Jain (2011) and Sharad Anantrao Joshi (2016) declined their posthumous conferments, and Baba Amte returned his 1986 conferment in 1991.

In 2026, the award was bestowed upon five recipients – Dharmendra (posthumous), K. T. Thomas, N. Rajam, P. Narayanan, & V. S. Achuthanandan (posthumous)

== History ==
On 2 January 1954, a press release was published from the office of the secretary to the President of India announcing the creation of two civilian awards—Bharat Ratna, the highest civilian award, and the three-tier Padma Vibhushan, classified into "Pahela Varg" (Class I), "Dusra Varg" (Class II), and "Tisra Varg" (Class III), which rank below the Bharat Ratna. On 15 January 1955, the Padma Vibhushan was reclassified into three different awards: the Padma Vibhushan, the highest of the three, followed by the Padma Bhushan and the Padma Shri.

The award, along with other personal civilian honours, was briefly suspended twice in its history; for the first time in July 1977 when Morarji Desai was sworn in as the fourth Prime Minister of India, for being "worthless and politicized". The suspension was rescinded on 25 January 1980 after Indira Gandhi returned as Prime Minister.

The civilian awards were suspended again in mid-1992, when two Public-Interest Litigations were filed in the High Courts of India, one in the Kerala High Court on 13 February 1992 by Balaji Raghavan and another in the Madhya Pradesh High Court (Indore Bench) on 24 August 1992 by Satya Pal Anand. Both petitioners questioned the civilian awards being "titles" per an interpretation of Article 18 (1) of the Constitution of India. (Note: Per Article 18 (1) of the Constitution of India: Abolition of titles, "no title, not being a military or academic distinction, shall be conferred by the State".)

On 25 August 1992, the Madhya Pradesh High Court issued a notice temporarily suspending all civilian awards. A Special Division Bench of the Supreme Court of India was formed comprising five judges: A. M. Ahmadi C. J., Kuldip Singh, B. P. Jeevan Reddy, N. P. Singh, and S. Saghir Ahmad. On 15 December 1995, the Special Division Bench restored the awards and delivered a judgment that the "Bharat Ratna and Padma awards are not titles under Article 18 of the Constitution of India".

== Regulations ==
The award is conferred for "exceptional and distinguished service", without distinction of race, occupation, position, or sex. The criteria include "service in any field including service rendered by Government servants", but excludes those working with the public sector undertakings, with the exception of doctors and scientists. The 1954 statutes did not allow posthumous awards, but this was subsequently modified in the January 1955 statute; Aditya Nath Jha, Ghulam Mohammed Sadiq, and Vikram Sarabhai became the first recipients to be honoured posthumously in 1972.

The recommendations are received from all state and union territory governments, the Ministries of the Government of India, the Bharat Ratna and previous Padma Vibhushan award recipients, the Institutes of Excellence, the Ministers, the Chief Ministers, the Governors of State, and the Members of Parliament, including private individuals. The recommendations received during 1 May and 15 September of every year are submitted to the Padma Awards Committee, convened by the Prime Minister of India. The Awards Committee later submits its recommendations to the Prime Minister and the President of India for further approval.

The Padma Vibhushan award recipients are announced every year on Republic Day of India and registered in The Gazette of India—a publication released weekly by the Department of Publication, Ministry of Urban Development used for official government notices. The conferral of the award is not considered official without its publication in the Gazette. Recipients whose awards have been revoked or restored, both of which actions require the authority of the President, are also registered in the Gazette and are required to surrender their medals when their names are struck from the register.

== Specifications ==
The original 1954 specifications of the award called for a circle made of gold gilt 1 3/8 inches (35 mm) in diameter, with rims on both sides. A centrally located lotus flower was embossed on the obverse side of the medal and the text "Padma Vibhushan" written in Devanagari script was inscribed above the lotus along the upper edge of the medal. A floral wreath was embossed along the lower edge and a lotus wreath at the top along the upper edge. The Emblem of India was placed in the centre of the reverse side with the text "Desh Seva" in Devanagari Script on the lower edge. The medal was suspended by a pink riband 1 1/4 inches (32 mm) in width divided into two equal segments by a white vertical line.

A year later, the design was modified. The current decoration is a circular-shaped bronze toned medallion 1 3/4 inches (44 mm) in diameter and 1/8 inch (3.2 mm) thick. The centrally placed pattern made of outer lines of a square of 1 3/16 inches (30 mm) side is embossed with a knob carved within each of the outer angles of the pattern. A raised circular space of 1 1/16 inches (27 mm) in diameter is placed at the centre of the decoration. A centrally located lotus flower is embossed on the obverse side of the medal and the text "Padma" written in Devanagari script is placed above and the text "Vibhushan" is placed below the lotus.

The Emblem of India is placed in the centre of the reverse side with the national motto of India, "Satyameva Jayate" (Truth alone triumphs), in Devanagari Script, inscribed on the lower edge. The rim, the edges. and all embossing on either side is of white gold with the text "Padma Vibhushan" of silver gilt. The medal is suspended by a pink riband 1 1/4 inches (32 mm) in width.

The medal is ranked fourth in the order of precedence of wearing of medals and decorations. The medals are produced at Alipore Mint, Kolkata along with the other civilian and military awards like Bharat Ratna, Padma Bhushan, Padma Shri, and Param Veer Chakra.

== Refusals and controversies ==
Some of the bestowals of the Padma Vibhushan have been refused or returned by the recipients.

== Recipients ==
Award recipients by decade
Year	Number of recipients
1954–1959	17
1960–1969	27
1970–1979	53
1980–1989	20
1990–1999	42
2000–2009	86
2010–2019	62
2020–present	41

Award recipients by field
Field	Number of recipients
Arts	67
Civil Service	53
Literature & Education	43
Medicine	16
Others	8
Public Affairs	79
Science & Engineering	37
Social Work	18
Sports	4
Trade & Industry	13

The first recipients of the Padma Vibhushan were Satyendra Nath Bose, Nandalal Bose, Zakir Husain, Balasaheb Gangadhar Kher, V. K. Krishna Menon, and Jigme Dorji Wangchuck, who were honoured in 1954. As of 2020, the award has been bestowed on 314 individuals, including seventeen posthumous and twenty-one non-citizen recipients.

Some of the conferments have been refused or returned by the recipients; P. N. Haksar, (Note: P. N. Haksar was offered the award in 1973 for, among other services, his crucial diplomatic role in brokering the Indo-Soviet Treaty of Friendship and Cooperation and the Shimla Agreement, but declined as "Accepting an award for work done somehow causes an inexplicable discomfort to me.") Vilayat Khan, (Note: Vilayat Khan refused Padma Shri (1964), Padma Bhushan (1968), and Padma Vibhushan (2000) and stated that "the selection committees were incompetent to judge [his] music".) E. M. S. Namboodiripad, (Note: E. M. S. Namboodiripad, the General Secretary of the Communist Party of India (of the Communist Party of India (Marxist) from 1964) and the first Chief Minister of Kerala (1957–59, 1967–69), declined the award in 1992, as it went against his nature to accept a state honour.) Swami Ranganathananda, (Note: Swami Ranganathananda declined the award in 2000 as it was conferred to him as an individual and not to the Ramakrishna Mission.) and Manikonda Chalapathi Rau refused the award. The family members of Lakshmi Chand Jain (2011) and Sharad Anantrao Joshi (2016) declined their posthumous conferments. (Note: Lakshmi Chand Jain died on 14 November 2010, at the age of 84. His family refused to accept the posthumous honour as Jain was against accepting state honours.) (Note: Sharad Anantrao Joshi's family refused to accept the posthumous honour as Joshi's work for good of farmers is not reflected in the Government policies for them.) Baba Amte returned his 1986 conferment in 1991. (Note: In 1991, Baba Amte returned the award, along with the Padma Shri conferred in 1971, to protest against the treatment given to the tribals during the construction of Sardar Sarovar Dam.)

Droupadi Murmu, President of India, announced the recipients of the prestigious Padma Awards on 24 April 2024. The awards, including Padma Vibhushan, Padma Bhushan, and Padma Shri, honor individuals for exceptional contributions in various fields. The announcement highlights the nation's recognition of outstanding achievements and service to society.

== Bibliography ==
- Bhattacherje, S. B. (2009). Encyclopaedia of Indian Events & Dates. Sterling Publishers Pvt. Ltd. ISBN 978-81-207-4074-7.
- Edgar, Thorpe (2011). The Pearson General Knowledge Manual 2011. Pearson Education India. ISBN 978-81-317-5640-9.
- Hoiberg, Dale; Ramchandani, Indu (2000). Students' Britannica India. Vol. 1–5. Popular Prakashan. ISBN 978-81-7156-112-4.
