= B. Sivaraman =

Indian civil servant

- Born: India
- Occupation: Civil servant
- Known for: Cabinet Secretary of India
- Awards: Padma Vibhushan

Balaram Sivaraman was an Indian civil servant, writer and the tenth Cabinet Secretary of India. He assumed office on 1 January 1969 and held the position until 30 November 1970. The Government of India awarded him the Padma Vibhushan, the second highest Indian civilian award, in 1971.

== See also ==
- Dharma Vira
- B. D. Pande

Preceded by D. S. Joshi	Cabinet Secretary of India; 1969–1970	Succeeded by T. Swaminathan
