= Surendra Singh (cabinet secretary) =

Chairman of the Civil Services of India

Cabinet Secretary of India
- In office August 1994 – July 1996
- Preceded by: Zafar Saifullah
- Succeeded by: T. S. R. Subramanian

Personal details
- Education: University of Allahabad
- Awards: Padma Bhushan (2011)

Surendra Singh was Cabinet Secretary in the Indian government from August 1994 to July 1996, as well as Chairman of the Civil Services of India. Prior to that he was Secretary of the former Indian Ministry of Industry.

== Early life and education ==
Singh received his college degree in mathematics from the University of Allahabad.

== Government service ==
Singh passed the Indian Civil Service exam in 1959 and started his service with the Indian Administrative Service (IAS).

From September 1985 to January 1989, Singh served as the Principal Secretary of the Department of Industries in the government of Uttar Pradesh. From then until August 1991, Singh served as a Special Secretary to the Ministry of Commerce and in the Prime Minister's Office. From August 1991 to July 1994, he was Secretary of the former Indian Ministry of Industry. In August 1994 he was appointed Cabinet Secretary, which position he held until his retirement from full-time service in July 1996.

== Later life ==
After leaving full-time government service in 1996, Singh accepted a position as a director for the World Bank Group on the boards of the International Bank for Reconstruction and Development (IBRD) and International Finance Corporation (IFC). He chaired the World Bank Committee on Development Effectiveness. Singh also served as the representative of India, Bangladesh, Sri Lanka and Bhutan at the World Bank with the rank of ambassador. However, he continued to advise the Indian government via various consultative committees, including those on industry, international economic relations, transport and tourism.

In 2001, Singh accepted a position as an independent director at NIIT Limited, a corporate training company. From 2001 to 2013, he served as independent director on the board of Jubilant Life Sciences Ltd (also known as Jubilant Organosys Ltd.). He was an independent director on the board of AXIS Bank Limited (formerly, UTI Bank Ltd.) until 27 April 2008. In 2008 he became an advisor to the Observer Research Foundation (ORF).

== Awards ==
In 2011 Singh received the Padma Bhushan.
