= 7th Central Pay Commission and Defence Forces =

Indian commission, 2014–2015

The 7th Central Pay Commission (7CPC), constituted in February 2014 the principles and structure of emoluments of all central government civilian employees including defence forces in India, submitted its report on 19 November 2015. 7CPC's recommendations affects the organization, rank structure, pay, allowances and pension, of 13,86,171 armed forces personnel. There is a salary monitoring system that is designed to determine and suggest needed changes to the salaries of government employees.^{page 105, para 6.2.2[3]}

Following the submission of the 7CPC report, the Chiefs of Staff of the Armed Forces in a submission to the Government stated that the recommendations of 7th CPC are anomalous, discriminatory, and at variance with historical parities. The anomalies identified by the armed forces are about use of different principles, policy, and formula by the 7CPC for determining armed forces pay, allowances, level, rank equivalence, pension, and status in comparison with the civil services, including defence civilians, police and intelligence services. These anomalies they have argued affect morale, command and control, and cohesion.

On 5 September 2016 the Bharatiya Janata Party (BJP) led National Democratic Alliance (NDA) government implemented the recommendations of the 7CPC including those affecting the armed forces with minor modifications. On 7 September 2016, the Chiefs of the Army, Navy, and Air Force, wrote to Narendra Modi, the Prime Minister, and Manohar Parrikar, the Defence Minister, conveying their concern about the "unresolved anomalies". They also write and inform their respective commands that they have been "constrained to request the government to hold implementation of 7th CPC award in abeyance in view of the anomalies which need to be resolved". On 14 September 2016 the headquarters of the three services, following assurances at the highest level that anomalies affecting armed forces pay, pension, allowances, rank parity, and status would be addressed, issued instructions to their commands to implement the government decision.

On 30 January 2018, President Ram Nath Kovind gave his nod to The 7th Pay Commission's suggestion of increasing the monthly salary of Chief Justice of India (CJI) to Rs 2.80 lakh per month from the present Rs 1 lakh per month, besides recommending a salary hike of the judges of the Supreme Court and the 25 High Courts in India.

== Background ==
The 7CPC was constituted against the background of the protracted public protest by ex-servicemen, including by senior officers, that started following the 6th CPC in 2008. These protest highlighted the perceived neglect of the armed forces on matters affecting their pay, pension status, levels, especially in comparison with police officers, and defence civilians, who were granted time bound promotions to the highest ranks, Non Functional Upgrade (NFU), and One Rank, One Pension (OROP) by the UPA Government.

To address the dissatisfaction in the armed forces over pay and allowances, the government added an additional term of reference(TOR), not included 5th and 6th Pay Commission, that enjoined the 7th CPC, "to review the principles and structure of emoluments of defence service personnel having regard to the historical and traditional parities". The government did not agree to Armed Forces representation in the CPC. Since the 4th Central Pay Commission (1986), when the concept of rank pay was introduced for the armed forces, pay commission recommendations affecting armed forces pay, and status, relative to civilian government employees, including the police, which wear rank badges similar to the army, have been cause of disappointment and disaffection in the armed forces.

== Pay scale(s) ==
=== Defence Pay Matrix ===
Pay Matrix (Basic Pay) (Indian Armed Forces Personnel - except Military Nursing Service)
Pay Band	5200-20200			9300-34800					15600-59100			37400-67000				67000-79000	75500-80000	80000	90000
Grade Pay	2000	2400	2800	3400	4200	4600	4800	5400	5400	6100	6600	8000	8700	8900	10000				
Level	3	4	5	5A	6	7	8	9	10	10B	11	12A	13	13A	14	15	16	17	18
Rank Group	Other Ranks (OR)				Junior Commissioned officers (JCO)				Commissioned Officers										
1	21700	25500	29200	33200	35400	44900	47600	53100	56100	61300	69400	116700	125700	139600	144200	182200	205400	225000	250000
2	22400	26500	30100	34200	36500	46200	49000	54700	57800	63100	71500	120200	129500	143800	148500	187700	211600		
3	23100	27100	31000	35000	37600	47600	50500	56300	59500	65000	73600	123800	133400	148100	153000	193300	217900		
4	23800	27900	31900	36400	38700	49000	52000	58000	61300	67000	75800	127500	137400	152500	157600	199100	224400		
5	24500	28700	32900	37500	39900	50500	53600	59700	63100	69000	78100	131300	141500	157100	162300	205100			
6	26000	30600	33900	38600	41100	52000	55200	61500	65000	71100	80400	135200	145700	161800	172200	211300			
7	26800	30500	34900	39800	42300	53600	56900	63300	67000	73200	82800	139300	150100	166700	177400	217600			
8	26800	31400	35900	41000	43600	55200	58600	65200	69000	75400	85300	143500	154600	171700	182700	224100			
9	27600	32300	37000	42200	44900	56900	60400	67200	71100	77700	87900	148700	159200	176900	188200				
10	28400	33500	38100	43500	46200	58600	62200	69200	73200	80000	90500	152200	164000	182200	193800				
11	29300	34500	39200	44800	47600	60400	64100	71300	75400	82400	93200	156800	168900	187700	199600				
12	30200	35500	40400	46100	49000	62200	66000	73400	77700	84900	96000	161500	174000	193300	205600				
13	31100	36400	41600	47500	50500	64100	68000	75600	80000	87400	98900	166300	179200	199600	211800				
14	32000	37500	42800	48900	52000	66000	70000	77900	82400	90000	101900	171300	184600	205600	218200				
15	33600	38600	44100	50400	53600	68000	72100	80200	84900	92700	105000	176400	190100	211800					
16	34600	39800	45400	51000	55200	70000	74300	82600	87400	95000	108200	181700	195800	218200					
17	35800	41000	46800	53300	56900	72100	76500	85100	90000	98400	111400	187200	201700						
18	36100	42200	48200	55100	58600	74300	78800	87700	92700	101400	114700	192800	207800						
19	37200	43500	49600	56800	60400	76500	81200	90300	95500	104400	118100	198600	214000						
20	38300	48800	51100	58550	62200	78800	83600	93000	98400	107500	121600	204600							
21	39400	46100	52600	60300	64100	81200	86100	95800	101400	110700	125200	210700							
22	40000	47500	54200	62100	66000	83600	88700	98700	104400	114000	129000								
23	41800	48900	55800	64000	68000	86100	91400	101700	107500	117400	132900								
24	43100	50400	57500	65900	70000	88700	94100	104880	110700	120900	136900								

=== Additional Allowance(s) ===
General Pay Components & Allowances (Indian Armed Forces – 7th CPC)
Pay/Allowance	Amount (₹)	Eligibility	Remarks / Citation
Military Service Pay (MSP)	₹15,500 (Officers), ₹5,200 (JCOs/ORs)	All personnel below Brigadier or equivalent	7th CPC, MoD Order No. 1(6)/2016-D(Pay/Services)
Dearness Allowance (DA)	~50% of Basic Pay (as of July 2024)	All personnel	Revised twice a year; applicable on Basic + MSP
House Rent Allowance (HRA)	27%, 18%, or 9% of Basic Pay	Based on city category (X/Y/Z)	MoF O.M. No. 2/5/2017-E.II(B)
Transport Allowance	₹900 – ₹7,200 + DA	All; varies by level and city class	As per MoF rules; higher for PwD
Dress Allowance	₹20,000 (Officers), ₹10,000 (JCOs/ORs)	Annual, all personnel	Replaces old uniform-related allowances
Kit Maintenance Allowance	~₹20,000/year (estimated)	All	Gear upkeep; varies across services
Leave Travel Concession (LTC)	Sleeper/AC 3 travel for NCOs, AC 2 travel or airfare for JCOs and officers	All personnel	Includes dependent travel; per MoD LTC rules
Children Education Allowance	₹2,250/month/child (max 2)	All personnel	₹6,750/month for hostel subsidy
Instructional Allowance	₹2,250	Instructors in training institutes	For postings at academies, SIs
Non-Practicing Allowance (NPA)	20-25% of Basic Pay	Only for commissioned Medical Officers	MoD O.M. No. 1(7)/2016-D(Pay/Services); subject to apex pay ceiling
Special Forces Allowance	₹25,000/month	For MARCOS, Para SF, Garud SF	
Flying Allowance	₹25,000/month	For qualified aviators in Army Aviation Corps, Indian Naval Air Arm and IAF	Only applicable for commissioned officers
Risk & Hardship (R&H) Allowance	R1H2 (OF) ₹25,000; R1H2 (JCO/OR) ₹17,300; R2H2 (OF) ₹13,500; R2H2 (JCO/OR) ₹9,700; R2H1 (OF) ₹16,900; R2H1 (JCO/OR) ₹12,200	Applicable for areas like Kashmir LoC, IED- prone zones, ie R1H2. R2H2 for desert and remote areas and R2H1 for MoD designated areas.	Applicable for all personnel
Siachen Allowance	Officers (₹42,500) & JCO/OR (₹30,000)	R1H1, ie most extreme designated area.	
Parachute Pay/Parachute Jump Instructor Allowance	₹10,500	Only for qualified personnel posted in Parachute Regiment.	
High Altitude Allowance	9,000-15,000 ft (₹3400 for OF & ₹2400 for JCO/OR); 15,000-18,000 ft (₹4200 for OF & ₹2800 for JCO/OR); Above 18,000 ft (₹5300 for OF & ₹3600 for JCO/OR)		

==== Additional Indian Navy specific allowances ====
Allowance Type	Officers (₹/month)	Sailors (₹/month)	Remarks
Sea-Going Allowance (SGA)	₹10,500	₹5,300	For personnel posted onboard operational ships
Submarine Duty Allowance	₹15,750	₹10,500	For qualified submarine crew (SSK, SSBN, etc.)
Submarine Technical Allowance	₹15,750	₹10,500	For technical trades (e.g. electrical, mechanical) in subs
MARCOS (Marine Commando) Allowance	₹25,000	₹17,300	For trained MARCOS personnel only
Diving Allowance	₹10,500	₹5,300	For qualified clearance/diving personnel
Hard Area Allowance	₹6,000 – ₹16,900	₹6,000 – ₹16,900	For postings in A&N Islands, NE, remote naval bases
Technical Allowance (Group X/Y)	–	₹3,600 (X), ₹1,600 (Y)	For technical trades (engine, sonar, radar, etc.)
Instructional Allowance	₹3,600	₹2,700	For instructors at training establishments (e.g. INS Chilka)
Uniform Allowance	₹20,000/year	₹20,000/year	For uniform purchase and upkeep; annual reimbursement
Flying Allowance (Naval Aviators)	₹25,000	–	For pilots in Naval Air Arm (e.g. MiG-29K, ALH, Dornier)
Counter Insurgency Allowance	₹25,000	₹17,300	If deployed in CI/CT zones (e.g. NE, Kashmir)
High Altitude Allowance	₹3,400 – ₹5,300	₹2,400 – ₹3,600	If posted in high-altitude naval units (e.g. Leh detachment)

=== Civilian Pay Matrix ===
7th CPC Civilian Pay Matrix – Government of India
Pay Level	Starting Basic Pay (₹)	Maximum Pay (₹)
Group C
Level 1	18,000	56,900
Level 2	19,900	63,200
Level 3	21,700	69,100
Level 4	25,500	81,100
Level 5	29,200	92,300
Group B
Level 6	35,400	1,12,400
Level 7	44,900	1,42,400
Group B (Gazetted)
Level 8	47,600	1,51,100
Level 9	53,100	1,67,800
Group A (Gazetted)
Level 10	56,100	1,77,500
Level 11	67,700	2,08,700
Level 12	78,800	2,09,200
Level 13	1,23,100	2,15,900
Level 13A	1,31,100	2,16,600
Level 14	1,44,200	2,18,200
Level 15	1,82,200	2,24,100
Level 16	2,05,400	2,24,400
Level 17	2,25,000	2,25,000 (Fixed)
Level 18	2,50,000	2,50,000 (Fixed)

== Composition of 7CPC ==
The commission consisted of three members, and one member secretary. The 1st CPC (1947) had no member secretary. Since then all pay commissions have had a member secretary, usually from the IAS.

Table 1 Composition of the 7CPC
	Name	Title	Background	Remarks
1	Ashok Kumar Mathur	Chairman	Former Judge, Supreme Court of India, and Chairman, Armed Forces Tribunal	
2	Vivek Rae	Member	Indian Administrative Service (IAS), Secretary, Ministry of Petroleum and Natural Gas. Earlier in the Ministry of Defence (MOD) as Director General (Acquisition) until 2012	Rae, in a break from the past, disagreed with some of the recommendations favoured by Mr Mathur, including on his recommendation favouring police parity with IAS, and on NFU.
3	Rathin Roy	Member [part time]	Director, NIPFP	Roy, disagreed with Mr Mathur a appended a dissent note including on Non Functional Upgrade (NFU). Roy and Mr Rae, in their dissent note, the only time in the history of pay commissions members disagreed with the chairman, concluded that the Indian bureaucracy and Police have set a world record "for career progression in government bureaucracies", by recklessly de-linking "promotions from career progression"
	Ms Meena Agarwal	Secretary	Railway Accounts Service, 1981 batch. OSD, Department of Expenditure, Ministry of Finance	

=== Secretariat ===
7CPC had a secretariat of 18 government officials on deputation from their respective departments to the commission. In addition, the commission hired 16 consultants to advice it on its work. The consultants are not named in the report, and their contribution are not documented.

The secretariat was composed of members of Indian Administrative Service (IAS), Indian Postal service, Indian Railway Accounts Service, Indian Post and Telegraph Accounts and Finance Service. Senior officials involved in the preparation of the report were: Jayant Sinha, Indian Audit and Accounts Service (IA&AS), 1990 batch, (who on completion of his tenure in the 7th CPC was posted in the Department of Defence, Ministry of Defence); Ms Yashashri Shukla, Indian Post and Telegraph Accounts and Finance Service', Mudit Mittal, Indian Railway Accounts Service; Samir Kumar Sinha, IAS officer of Bihar cadre and Rajiv Mishra, 'Advisor' and 'economist'.

D.K. Rai, Indian Defence Account Service (IDSA), 2000 batch, was responsible for processing armed forces pay and allowances, including reviewing the submissions from the armed forces headquarters. Rai, according to Mr Mathur was "great help" in "determining the pay structure for the defence forces", because of his "insight into the financial intricacies of the pay structure of the defense service".

=== Armed Forces representation ===
The mandate of 1st Central Pay Commission (nine members) and the 2nd Central Pay Commission (six members) was to examine and recommend emolument structure for central government civilian employees. "The structure of emoluments and benefits of service personnel" was made by separate Departmental Committee, with proper service representation, " in the light of the recommendations made by the pay commission for civilian employees". The first committee was called "The Post War Pay Committee for the Armed Forces". The pensionary benefits were examined by separate committee called " Armed Forces Pension Revision Committee (1949–50)". A similar procedure was followed after the second pay commission by the Raghuramiah Committee(1960), which too had service representatives.

Since the 3rd Pay Commission(1500 pages, April 1973), the mandate of all pay commissions has included all central government civilian employees, including defence forces. All pay commissions, including 3CPC, 4CPC, 5CPC, and 6CPC, have had no military member. Following the protest after the government decision to implement 6CPC, Manmohan Singh, in 2008, assured the armed forces that there will be a separate commission for the armed forces with appropriate armed forces participation. Eventually, there was no separate commission, or military representation, including in the secretariat, and among consultants hired by the 7CPC. Neither did any of the 7CPC member, consultants or secretariat staff, have any background or direct knowledge of its organizational culture or work.

=== Armed forces representation in other developed democracies ===
In the UK Pay Commissions is "An independent Body which provides advice to the Review Body (AFPRB) Prime Minister and the Secretary of State for Defence on the remuneration and charges for Service personnel". AFPRB is composed of experts including always a senior retired armed forces officer, who serves in the body for number of years.

The US had a far more evolved system Military Compensation system. Military compensations, by law, is required to be reviewed every four years. According to the basic congressional mandate contained in 37 U.S.C. §1008(b) each Quadrennial Review is required to do "a complete review of the principles and concepts of the compensation system for members of the uniformed services ... in relation to national security objectives" and "in an era typified by rapid technological developments and changing battlefield tactics".

== Terms of reference ==
The terms of reference of the commission was: To examine, "the principles that should govern the emoluments structure including pay, allowances and other facilities/benefits, in cash or kind," of civilian employees of the central government (33.02 lakh); and of the Defence forces (13,86,171)

The term of reference specific to the consideration of armed forces pay, pension, and rank structure reads: "having regard to the historical and traditional parities, with due emphasis on the aspects unique to these personnel". The term historical and traditional parities is neither examined or defined by the commission in the report. It is however frequently referred to by the commission, including in justifying its recommendations affecting the armed forces. See for instance, the commissions justifications in paragraphs 5.2.11, 6.2.14, and 7.2.31 of 7CPC report.

== Definitions ==
=== Anomaly ===
According to Ministry of Personnel, Public Grievances and pensions, an anomaly (a deviation from the common rule, type, arrangement, or form; an incongruity or inconsistency)for the purposes of examining the 7CPC, includes the following two cases: "(a) where the Official Side and the Staff Side are of the opinion that any recommendation is in contravention of the principle or the policy enunciated by the Seventh Central Pay Commission itself without the Commission assigning any reason; and (b) where the maximum of the Level in the Pay Matrix corresponding to the applicable Grade Pay in the Pay Band under the pre-revised structure, as notified vide CCS (RP) Rules 2016, is less than the amount an employee is entitled to be fixed at, as per the formula for fixation of pay contained in the said Rules".

=== Grade, level, and rank ===
Grade pay, level, and rank are used interchangeably by 7CPC and government in its various implementation orders The 20 distinct pay grades or ranks in the government hierarchy, intended to 'determine the status', and the Seniority of a post. and make "Pay scales ..irrelevant for purposes of computing seniority". proposed by the 6CPC, and accepted by the Congress I government, in 2008, have been replaced by 18 "New functional levels" l which the BJP government has accepted on 25 July 2016.

The 'levels' which correlate to ranks, in civil and military hierarchy, were "arrived at by merging the grade pay with the pay in the pay band". The "Level" is, according to the 7CPC, the new "status determiner". All levels, and ranks, civilian and military are covered in the level 1 to 18 spectrum. Chiefs of the armed forces, and the cabinet secretary, are at level 18.

== Recommendation and Anomalies ==
Armed forces have identified 37 anomalies in the 7CPC recommendations that affect the armed forces. These 'anomalies' relate to armed forces pay, allowances, 'levels'(ranks), status, pensions, disability pay, civil military relations, military morale, cohesion, and other issues. These anomalies have been subject of joint letters by the Chiefs of Staff to the prime Minister and the defence minister. Some of issues are as follows:

(a) Principles, and formulas, used by the commission used to determine time scale pay and levels, of the armed forces, and specially the civilian security apparatus, which consists of defence civilians, and police led para military forces, now called Central Armed Police Force, police bureaucracy, and secret police intelligence services. The armed forces have alleged their salaries have been "artificially suppressed", which have affected armed forces time scale ranks of captain, majors, and lt colonels, and selection grade ranks of colonel, and brigadiers.

(b) The award of non-functional upgrade (NFU) by 6CPC to the civilian services and the police, while denying it to the armed forces. The armed forces demanded that it be extended to the Armed forces on for same reasons it has been granted to other government servants.

(c) Increase military service pay (MSP) for Junior Commissioned Officers (JCOs) to Rs 10,000. The 7th CPC had, recommended Rs 5,200 as MSP for JCOs and other ranks. The Military Service Pay (MSP) for officers between Lieutenant-rank and Brigadier-rank is Rs 15,500.

(d) Disability to be "percentage based", and par with civilians, rather than "slab based" system recommended by 7CPC.

=== Anomalies in pay matrix ===
MOD instructions on implementation of the recommendations of the 7CPC " relating to the structure of emoluments, allowances and conditions of service of Armed Forces personnel" was issued on 5 September 2016. The basis for determining armed forces pay, level, status, pension, recommended by 7CPC is similar to 6CPC, except for terminological changes. The 7CPC recommended replacing 'grade pay and pay bands' of 6CPC, with two "Pay Matrices": one for the civil services, police, defence civilians, and another for the armed forces. The term 'levels', is analogous to grade pay, and rank. The matrix for the civilian security sector (police and defence civilians), provides for time scale pay promotions at 4, 9, 13, 14, and 16/18 years of service. The time scale promotions for the armed forces for time scale levels at 6, 13, 21 years of service. The differentiated and asymmetries pay matrices have become a contentious issue, and are not in accord with historical parities, according to the Armed forces. The government in response made some changes to 7CPC recommendations in its implementation order.

For instance, the commanding officer of INS Vikramaditya, India's aircraft carrier, a selective rank and appointment, with some 20 years of service, is, according to the new pay levels, below an Indian police officer with 14 years' service (in 'level' (rank), pay, and protocol), and two level below police officers with 16 years of time scale service.

The comparative time scale 'levels' between police and defence civilians and the armed forces are tabulated below.

Table 2 : 7CPC Comparative Time scale 'Levels': defence Civilians Police and Armed Forces
Completed Years of service	Time scale level (rank), index, and (Pay at stage1): Defence civilians, & Police	7CPC Recommendation Level, index, & Pay (at stage 1) Armed Forces Officers	Armed forces officers Pay and levels after modification	Anomalies
4	level 11, index 2.67, ₹67,700	level 10B, 2.67, ₹61,300	No Change	Armed forces rank affected captain, and equivalents in the air force and navy.
6	-	Level 11, index 2.67, ₹69,400	No change	-
9	level 12, index 2.67, ₹78,800	Level 11, stage 4, ₹75,800	-	IDSA officers who wear majors' badges and uniforms, while serving in UN Peace Keeping mission with Indian army units are a higher level, and receive higher pay, than army officers with more years of service.
13	Level 13, Index 2.57, ₹118,500	Level 12 A, index 2.57, ₹116,700	No Change in 'level'. Pay Stage revised from 1 to 3 in level 12 A, (₹123,800)	On completion of 13 years' service police officers and defence civilians move to time scale level 13; service officers- Lt Colonel /Wing Commander/Commanders- remain at level 12 A.
14	level 13 A, index 2.67, ₹131,100	Level 12 A, 2.57	no change	Brigadiers pay modified in Defence Pay Matrix by 2 stages, and revises index from 2.57 to 2.67, but kept below 2.72, which is applicable to defence civilians and police on completion of 16 years' service.
16	Level 14, index 2.72, ₹144,200	Level 12 A, 2.57 [Lt colonel would move up to stage 7 'level 12 A' ₹139,300]	-	Police, and IDAS officer on completion of 16 years will automatically move to level 14. The IDAS has 61 post at this level, for a cadre of 553. The 7CPC has recommended that police officer on completion of 16 years' service called inspector general, a time scale level will be promoted to level 14

=== Anomalies in levels and ranks ===
Among the 37 anomalies highlighted by the armed forces headquarters to the ministry of defence (MOD) critical ones relates to asymmetries in armed and civil and police pay, rank, and allowances. The inclusion of historical and traditional relativity' in the 'term of reference' in 7CPC notification, it was hoped, would address this issue, especially against the background of public protest from 2008 to 2015, under the One Rank One Pension banner, in which a significant number of senior most retired personnel of the armed forces participated, and highlighted the growing gap between the pay, and status of armed forces and defence civilians, police, and other civilian officers. Following the decision of the BJP government to implement the levels with existing anomalies, the Chiefs of three armed forces to write to the defence minister and the prime minister conveying their dismay at the anomalies in the levels, and ranks, and status, of armed forces officer in comparison with defence civilians, and the police officers.

The main cause for the anomalies in pay and rank and allowances between the armed forces and civil servants including police officers, is because the 7CPC used different yard stick in allocation of 'levels' between the armed forces and the civilians government employees. Especially so in the progression for time scale levels, and ranks, in the civilian and police cadres and the armed forces (Table 2 above). Some of the anomalies relating to pay, status, rank, are as follows:

- Armed forces officers (army, navy, and air-force) reach level 11 (major) after 6 years, while civilian officers including defence civilians, and police, reach level 11 in 4 years including one year spent in training. Defence civilians from accounts, audit, other departments and the police move up to Level 12 on completion of 9 years' service in group A; service officer remain at level 11.
- Armed forces don't have level 12; instead they have 'level 12 A' which corresponds to old grade pay 1000, in pay band 4, tenable by armed forces officers with 13 years' service (lieutenant colonels, wing commanders, and naval commanders). Defence civilians, and police, and other civil servants, on completion of 13 years' service are promoted anomalously to 'level 13', while armed forces officers with 13 year service remain level 12 A, creating a pay, level, and status differentiation at the time scale level.
- On completion of 14 years' service police officers and defence civilians move to time scale level 13A; service officers- Lt Colonel /Wing Commander/Commanders- remain at level 12 A.
- Brigadiers [a selection grade rank] is equated with Level 13A [ time scale].
- On completion of 16 years' service police officers and defence civilians move to time scale level 14; service officers- Lt Colonel /Wing Commander/Commanders- remain at level 12 A, colonels at level 13, and brigadiers at 13A.

These and other pay, and status, anomalies have been resented by the armed forces headquarters.

=== Non Functional Upgrade (NFU) and 7CPC ===
Civilians

The government in the resolution notifying its acceptance of the 7CPC in July 2016 decides to maintain the status quo on Non Functional Upgrade (NFU) admissible to all Organised Group 'A' Services, including defence civilians, even though there was no consensus in the commission for continuing with NFU. Two Members of the commission, in their dissent note, had said that "exclusion of Defense forces from NFU" by the UPA government was "unfair", and that Organised Group 'A' Services were guilty of recklessly de-linking "promotions from career progression", and that they are far less deserving than the officers of the Defence Forces. They recommended that NFU be abolished for all services.

Armed forces

Chairperson of 7CPC in his recommendations in the 7CPC report recommended that a watered down NFU with long residencies "be extended to the officers of the Defence forces and CAPFs" to "ameliorate the difficulties faced by the officers owing to stagnation at various levels". The government however decided not to extend NFU to the armed forces. Manohar Parrikar, Defence Minister, had had the MOD in its submission to Chairman of the 7CPC, on 24 December 2014, opposed NFU for the armed forces on among other grounds that NFU is applicable only to organized Group 'A' Services.

=== Siachen Allowance ===
Siachen Allowance is an allowance given to officers and men of the armed forces posted in Siachen, a high altitude area, with extreme weather conditions. The 7CPC in its recommendation noted that "keeping in view the extremely difficult conditions in the area" and recognizing that the hardship and risk in Siachen is "maximum that any Government servant faces", created an extra 'cell' called Risk hardship Maximum (RH-Max) outside its "Risk and Hardship Matrix" of nine cells each representing low, medium and high levels of hardship and risk . Saichen allowance, 7CPC explained, is the ceiling for Risk and hardship allowance (RHA) because "no government employee faces more Risk/Hardship in his work than our Defence officers and jawans posted in Siachen Glacier. Hence, no RHA can have a value higher than this allowance" ^{:para 8.10.67}Saichen allowance is the highest in the hierarchy of allowances.^{:para 8.10.66} The 7CPC recommended that the existing allowance of Rs 21000 pm for officers be increased to Rs 31,500, and for JCOs, NCOs and other ranks increased from ₹ 14, 000 pm to 21,000^{:para 8.10.47}

The 7CPC however, anomalously recommended several allowances which have "a higher value" than the Saichen allowance, even though these allowances are lower in the hierarchy of risk and hardship matrix. Among the allowances which is higher in value than Saichen allowance is the Special Duty Allowance (SDA), which is 30 percent of pay unlike the Saichen allowance which is a fixed amount. SDA is paid to defence civilians and police officers among other group A services posted in NE India, and Ladakh, including in Gawahati, Aizawl, Shillong, Kohima and Leh.: para 4.2.14: para 8.17.115The armed forces headquarters have said that "Siachen cannot be equal or lower to Guwahati when deciding on the "hardship" factor". They have recommended a new "hardship matrix" to decide allowances for the armed forces. They have recommended 65 percent of salary as Saichen allowance.Finance and defence minister Arun Jaitley, briefing media after a meeting of the Cabinet, said the hardship allowance for officers would be increased to Rs 42,500 per month.

Table 3: Comparative scales: Saichen Allowance and Special Duty Allowance (SDA) for officers recommended by 7CPC
	Amount in Rs (13 years of service)	Amount in Rs (14 years of service)	Amount in Rs (17 years of service)	Remarks
Saichen allowance: Fixed amount^{:para 8.10.47}	42,500	42,500	42,500	The existing allowance for officers is Rs 21000. The allowance recommended by 7CPC is 42,500 for officers, and ₹ 30, 000 pm for JCOs, NCOs and other ranks.^{:para 8.10.47} Police Officers and defence civilian officers are not posted to the Siachen glacier.
SDA allowance: variable, according to pay.	35,3550	^{39,330}	43,260 ^{:table 5 Pay matrix}	Existing SDA is 37.5 percent of pay. 7CPC has recommended 30 percent of pay.: para 4.2.14: para 8.17.115All Group A services posted in NE India, and Ladakh, including Police and defence civilians officers are eligible for SDA, which is meant to "offset the security environment and the difficult working and living conditions prevailing in North Eastern Region".: para 4.2.14Armed Forces officers are not eligible for the SDA. ^{^{: chapters 18.10 and 18.17}}

== Response to 7CPC ==
=== Indian National Congress ===
Shashi Tharoor, former Under-Secretary-General of the United Nations, and INC spokesperson, Ajay Kumar, Member of Parliament, spokesperson of the All India Congress Committee (AICC) and Captain Amarinder Singh, former Chief Minister of Punjab, and current president of Congress Committee in Punjab, have called the 7CPC recommendation for the armed forces discriminatory.

Sashi Tharoor in March 2016, wrote, that the consequences of government policy of lowering "the status and compensation of our military personnel", will "inevitably be suffered by all". And that he failed to understand what could justify a policy that equates police officers [and defence civilians], designated as deputy inspector general (DIG) of the police, with Brigadiers, for pay and protocol.

Ajay Kumar, the former Indian Police Service (IPS) officer, said that some of the recommendations of the 7th Pay commission were "of the page", and that the existing promotion policy (for the IAS and IPS) was flawed, and indefensible, and even 'anti national'. The armed forces have got a bad deal mainly because, unlike the IAS and the IPS, the army has no 'association', and has very limited access to the political class compared to the phenomenal access of the police and the IAS, he said in nationally televised panel discussion. He disagreed with the policy which justifies the right of every IPS officer "to be DG of Police". It is "wrong for the country", he said.

Captain Amarinder Singh, former officer of the Sikh Regiment in September 2016 said that defence services should constitutionally be placed at higher level than the civil and police services. Lowering the status of the armed forces in the Warrant of Precedence, lowering pay scales in comparison with government cadres, and "bringing it below the police and now the central police organizations is a deliberate attempt to belittle the armed forces", he said. "Such repeated wrong steps on part of the government can only demoralise the defence forces", and that "India cannot afford a demoralised defence service with a belligerent China and mischievous Pakistan being next door neighbors".

=== Bharatiya Janata Party ===
PN Vijay, BJP spokesperson, in a nationally televised panel discussion on 7CPC and the armed forces said that the Indian Armed Forces perform far more complex task than that of police or the forest service, and that it is imperative for national security that the armed forces are treated at par with the other services. He however added that the final call on this will have to be taken by the government, more specifically the PM. He said 'joining the AF is not an easy decision'; we should not make the armed forces unattractive'. The BJP, he said, is sensitive to armed forces concerns. The time has come to have parity between the armed forces and the civil service; and defending the country has become very sophisticated and is far more complex than "handling a communal riot."

== Managing anomalies ==
To address the issue of 'anomalies' in the 7CPC report and recommendations, including those overlooked or not considered by the 'Committee of Empowered Secretaries' the BJP government constituted a committee on anomalies, and committee on anomalies in allowances. The armed forces are excluded from the anomalies committee, which has become cause of litigation.

=== Committee on anomalies ===
The mandate of the Committee on anomalies is to " a comprehensive view" of anomalies other than allowances. To consider the anomalies some 79 Departmental committees, under of respective Additional Secretary/ Joint Secretary, have been constituted. Each committee consists of Chairperson, a "Financial Adviser of the Ministry / Department", and a "Staff Side" member. These committees are expected to complete their work within one year, after which the "Government will approve or disapprove the recommendations of the Anomaly Committee". These committees will be supervised by Department of Personnel and Training.

=== Committee on anomalies in allowances ===
The committee on anomalies in allowances, consists of eight members. It is required to submit its report within four months. The allowances committee is to reconcile the anomalies in allowance recommended by the 7CPC including asymmetries between the Siachen and SDA allowances .

The anomalies committee consists of : [a] Ashok Lavasa, IAS, Finance Secretary, Chairman; [b] Rajiv Mehrishi, IAS, Home Secretary; [c] G.Mohan Kumar, IAS, Defence Secretary; [d] CK Mishra, IAS 1983, Bihar cadre, Secretary Health and Family Welfare; [e] B P Sharma, IAS 1981, Bihar cadre, Secretary, Personnel & Training; [f] Boyapati Venkat Sudhakar, Secretary, Department of Posts [g] A.K.Mittal, IRES, Chairman Railway Board. The armed forces are excluded from the anomalies committee, which has become cause of litigation.

=== Litigation ===
In response to a petition by Lt Colonel Preetpal Singh Grewal, a serving officer, the Punjab and Haryana High Court, Chandigarh, issued notice to the Ministry of Defence (MOD) to include representatives from the defence forces in the panel set up by the government on 12 September 2016 to examine anomalies in the 7CPC recommendations implemented by the government. The government had excluded armed forces representation from the 22 member committee headed by the secretary, Department of Personnel and Training (DoPT), a department under the PM. This is first time that a serving officer of the armed forces has appealed to a civil court on matter of policy affecting armed forces and civil-military relations.

Col Preetpal Singh Grewal, in his pleas to the High court, had submitted that: (a)'Anomalies Committees' constituted by government to look into the 7th CPC recommendations has excluded defence personnel and the defence headquarters from the anomalies redressal process; [b] MOD did not inform the defence services about the work of the committee; [c] defence services learnt about the commencement of hearing from press reports; [d] Supreme Court has already held that defence personnel should not be treated in a "shabby manner" or deprived of rights that are available to other citizens; [e] in view of statutory bar on defence personnel forming associations' there should be suitable alternative participation mechanism that meets at regular intervals where issues related to defence personnel could be discussed and resolved; and [f] Standing Committee on Welfare of Ex-Servicemen, has not yet held a single meeting, despite Defence Minister Manohar Parrikar instructions that it hold meetings every three months.

== Time line ==
27 December 2008

Manmohan Singh, Prime Minister, issues instructions that "In future, pay revision of the armed forces should be de-linked from that of civilians and separate board or commission should be set up for pay revision of the armed forces."

13 September 2013

India Today, cites a MOD letter leaked to it by a Joint Secretary in the MOD, titled 'Common VII Central Pay Commission' purportedly written by Air Chief Marshal NAK Browne, the Chairman Chief of Staff Committee (COSC), to AK Antony, Defence Minister. According to the 'letter' the government is in favour of a separate pay commission for the armed forces, but the armed forces would rather be part of the 7CPC instead of having a separate pay commission. Air Chief Marshal NAK Browne, according to the 'letter' opposed a separate pay commission for the armed Forces, because "a separate pay commission may not necessarily benefit the services as anomalies are invariably bound to arise in both cases"; and that the main cause dissatisfaction in the armed Forces is not a separate pay commission but the "non-resolution of anomalies or ex parte resolution of anomalies"

August 2014

Armed forces headquarters submit a joint services memorandum (JSM) to the 7CPC. The commission forwards the JSM to Ministry of Defence, Department of Ex-Servicemen Welfare, Controller General of Defence Accounts, Ministry of Home Affairs, Department of Personnel and Training, and others, "to draw .. upon the views of the key stakeholders within the government with regard to issues posed by the Defence Services".

24 December 2014

Manohar Parrikar, Defence Minister, on the advice of Defence Secretary R.K. Mathur, (25 May 2013 24- May 2015), informs Chairman of the 7CPC, that he does not favour Non Functional Upgrade (NFU) for the armed forces because Ajit Seth, Cabinet Secretary, in 2011, had not made "any recommendations on the issue".

May 2015

Armed forces headquarters send an addendum to their joint services memorandum (JSM) dated August 2014. Chairman 7CPC, forwards the addendum, to Ministry of Defence, Department of Ex-Servicemen Welfare, Controller General of Defence Accounts, Ministry of Home Affairs, Department of Personnel and Training, etc. "to draw ... upon the views of the key stakeholders within the government with regard to issues posed by the Defence Services"

19 November 2015

A K Mathur, the chairperson of 7CPC, submits 7CPC report.;

7 December 2015

Lt-Gen Harwant Singh, former Deputy Chief of Army Staff, in an article in the Hindustan Times says the 7CPC report is "misleading, and factually inaccurate" and that it represents 'perennial bias and prejudice' of bureaucrats in the MOD. He adds: "the sad state of soldiers seems to be of no one's concern: least of all the military's top brass".

15 December 2015

Prime Minister Narendra Modi, address Combined Commanders' Conference on board INS Vikramaditya. Defence Minister Manohar Parrikar says "analysing armed forces demands"

16 December 2015

Manohar Parrikar, Defence Minister, after laying wreath at Amar Jawan Jyoti at India Gate to mark Vijay Diwas (India), with the General Dalbir Singh, Chief of army Staff (COAS) Air Chief Marshal Arup Raha, Chief of Air Staff, and Admiral R.K. Dhowan, Chief of naval Staff, tells reporters "We are analyzing them (7th Pay Commission)" and that "by next week we will be able to see what can be done."

19 December 2015

General Dalbir Singh, Air Chief Marshal Arup Raha, and Admiral Robin Dhowan, send a joint memorandum to Defence Minister Manohar Parrikar. The memorandum highlights "several glaring inaccuracies and anomalies" in the 7CPC recommendations. Eight "critical issues and persisting core anomalies", are identified by armed forces headquarters. The anomalies, they say, will exacerbate disparities between the armed forces and the police and affect morale. To address these anomalies they recommend that these be examined by non partisan expert body or a parliamentary committee.

13 January 2016

Prime Minister Narendra Modi approves "Constitution of an Empowered Committee of Secretaries" under chairmanship of cabinet secretary to process the recommendations of the 7th Central Pay Commission with "regard to all relevant factors, in an expeditious detailed and holistic fashion".

27 January 2016

Finance Ministry issues instruction on the composition and work of the 7thCPC Empowered Committee. The 'Empowered Committee of Secretaries', has 13 members including the Cabinet Secretary, the chairperson. It is four times the size of the 7CPC, which had three members. Eight members are from the IAS, one from the Indian Police service, and one each from Department of Science and Technology, Railways, Audit and Account Service. The 'Empowered Committee of Secretaries' is mandated to screen the "recommendations of the Commission", and to take "in to account the views of concerned stake holders viz., Ministries, Departments, Staff Associations, and JCM". Defence civilians are represented by the defence secretary; the police, and secret police by former police officer official in the cabinet secretariat. There is no representation from the armed Forces in the empowered committee.

Members of the Empowered Committee include: [1] Pradeep Kumar Sinha, Cabinet Secretary, Chairman; [2] Ashok Lavasa, IAS, Finance Secretary (Expenditure); [3] Rajiv Mehrishi, IAS, Ministry of Home (MHA); [4] G. Mohan Kumar, IAS, Defence Secretary, MOD; [5] CK Mishra, IAS (1983, Bihar cadre), Secretary, IAS, Secretary Health and Family Welfare;[6] B P Sharma, IAS (1981, Bihar cadre), Secretary, Personnel & Training; [7] Secretary Department of Pensions; [8] Boyapati Venkat Sudhakar, Indian Postal Service, 1981 batch, Secretary, Department of Posts [9] A.K. Mittal, IRES, Chairman Railway Board [10] Secretary Security, Cabinet Secretariat; [11] Deputy Comptroller and Auditor General, IA&AS; [12] Secretary, Department of Science and Technology; [13] Dr. Hasmukh Adhia, IAS, (1981 batch Gujarat cadre), Secretary, Department of Revenue.

11 March 2016

Service chiefs brief "Empowered Committee of Secretaries"^{[1]}

22 March 2016

Manohar Parrikar, Defence Minister, according to MOD media briefing, agrees that there are flaws in the 7CPC, including flaws identified by three service chiefs. The armed forces identified 37 anomalies in the 7CPC report of which eight are considered critical. Some of the anomalies flagged by the armed forces are: [a] false equation and comparison of mandates, risks, and conditions of service of defence forces with the police paramilitary forces, Central Reserve Police Forces (CRPF), Border Security Force (BSF), Indo-Tibetan Border Police (ITBP), Central Industrial Security Force (CISF) and the Sashastra Seema Bal (SSB); [b] higher allowance (30 percent of salary) for to police officers, IAS officers, and defence civilians, posted in places like Gauhati and other towns than to armed forces officers and soldiers posted in Siachen [ 31500-20,000]. Parrikar, according to media reports, has conveyed to the empowered committee headed by the Cabinet Secretary that armed forces should be kept above all other "fighting" arms of the government .

March 2016

18 former chiefs of the armed forces, including General VP Malik, write to Narendra Modi the Prime Minister, conveying their disquiet on the impact of the recommendations of the 7CPC on the Indian Armed Forces, according to a statement by General VP Malik in a TV interview broadcast by NDTV. The Prime Minister, Malik said, has taken the retired chiefs for granted.

29 March 2016.

Manohar, Parrikar, Defence Minister, tells India Today, that "I do not think they (7CPC recommendations) will remain. I do not consider them as finalities(sic). I have flagged them and will flag them properly at the right level".

21 April 2016

Sashi Tharoor, former Under-Secretary-General of the United Nations, and spokesperson of the Congress (I), in an article averred that the present government is deliberately lowering "the status and compensation of our military personnel". It is hard, he wrote, to understand the reason for the government to equate police officers (and defence civilian officers) with 12 years of service, designated as deputy inspector general (DIG) of the police, with brigadiers, for pay and protocol. "What could possibly justify such a disparity?" He warned that the consequences of this policy "will inevitably be suffered by all". He faulted the 7CPC for recommending lesser disability pensions for a JCO and their equivalents in the air-force and the navy (Rs 12,000), while recommending receive a twice that amount (Rs 27,690) for equivalent civilian officials.

22 July 2016

In the wake of the criticism of the 7CPC recommendations on allowances, the government announces the constitution of a committee of seven bureaucrats for making "recommendations on allowances, other than Dearness Allowance". The seven members of the allowances committee are the same persons who were members of the "empowered Committee" of 13 secretaries. The committee is to submit its report within four months.

25 July 2016

The government issues resolution notifying acceptance of Commission's recommendations on "Pay Matrices and general recommendations on pay without any material alteration with the following exceptions in Defence Pay Matrix in order to maintain parity in pay with Central Armed Police Forces" : the Index of Rationalization of Level 13A (Brigadier) in Defence Pay Matrix revised upward from 2.57 to 2.67; (ii) additional three stages in Levels 12A (Lieutenant Colonel), three stages in Level 13 (Colonel) and two stages in Level 13A (Brigadier).

The resolution states that NonFunctional Upgradation (NFU), admissible to the Indian Police Service/Indian Forest Service and Organised Group 'A' Services, on which there was no consensus in the commission, is to remain. NFU not extended to the armed forces.

7 August 2016

General VP Malik, former Chief of Army Staff, in a panel discussion, says 7CPC recommendations are 'blatant discrimination' which has caused a strong sense of 'despondency' and feeling of 'resignation' in the armed forces. The decision by the government to accept the 7CPC recommendations to create two matrixes, one for the armed forces and another and another for the civil services, he says, will have several negative outcomes: it will give the civil services including the police services officers six increments in their first 13 years of service, in comparison to just one to the armed forces; the matrix and the resultant pay asymmetries will also aggravate the existing 'equations' which will adversely impact the already fraught civil-military relations. He said he was not convinced with the reasons given by the pay commission, that the armed forces task were any less complex than that of the police or the forest department which have been made at par with the IAS.

16 August 2016

Ministry of Defence (MOD) issues order to implement VII CPC. In addition to the Committee on allowances, the government sets up an anomalies committee. This committee under "Department of Personnel and Training" will "examine individual, post-specific and cadre-specific anomalies arising out of implementation of the recommendations of the commission". The Committee will submit its report within a period of four months. Anomaly, the order says will include the following two cases :"(a) where the Official Side and the Staff Side are of the opinion that any recommendation is in contravention of the principle or the policy enunciated by the Seventh Central Pay Commission itself without the Commission assigning any reason; and (b) where the maximum of the Level in the Pay Matrix corresponding to the applicable Grade Pay in the Pay Band under the pre-revised structure, as notified vide CCS (RP) Rules 2016, is less than the amount an employee is entitled to be fixed at, as per the formula for fixation of pay contained in the said Rules". The Anomaly Committees, which will be headed by Additional Secretary/ Joint Secretary, are expected to complete their work" within a period of one year from the date of its constitution, after which the government will approve or disapprove the recommendations of the Anomaly Committee. "Financial Adviser of the Ministry / Department shall be one of the Member of the Departmental Anomaly Committee". Unlike the civil departments which will have "Staff Side" integral to the consideration and resolution of anomalies, there will be no representation from the staff side from the armed forces

The anomalies committee has 79 nodal officers, including senior police bureaucrat Mahesh Kumar Singla (IPS, KL.1982) Special Secretary (Internal Security). The anomalies committee will have no armed forces representation. Issues affecting the armed forces will be dealt by MOD bureaucrat Ashok Dongre, JS(Esst/PG), 1987 batch IAS officer of Tamil Nadu cadre.

17 August 2016

Rajeev Chandrasekhar, Independent Rajya Sabha MP, member of Parliament's Standing Committee on Defence, commenting on the government to implement the flawed recommendations of the 7CPC in an interview said [a] "the issue is not about money but status of 'armed forces vis-à-vis other central government services', ... status in the hierarchy of service and command; [b] 'There is absolutely no doubt that IAS and IPS because of their proximity to the political powers have over successive pay commissions given themselves sweeter and sweeter deals and left the military out in the cold'.[c] This is because "the military has never been represented in these pay commissions"; [d] "If government has an explanation for this they should make it. If IAS or pay commission has a reason for this why are they not putting it out in public domain?"; [e] 46 anomalies from 6th Pay Commission and 36 from 7th Pay Commission remain unresolved and there is no legitimate answer given on why their requests are being turned down".

5 September 2016

Ministry of Defence (MOD) promulgates gazette notification on recommendations of 7CPC affecting armed forces notifies Implementation orders for 7CPC.

7 September 2016

Chiefs of Staff Committee (CoSC) meets and decides to withhold the implementation of 7CPC till 'anomalies' are resolved. A major anomaly is the lowering of level (rank), pay, and status of armed forces in comparison with defence civilians, police officers, and other civil servants. Parrikar, had assured the armed Forces as long back as March 2016 that "pay and allowances for the forces have to be paramount".

9 September 2016

Air Chief Marshal Arup Raha and Navy Chief Admiral Sunil Lamba, and General Dalbir Singh, write to the Prime Minister and Parrikar conveying their concern over "unresolved anomalies", and inform their formation and units that they were "constrained to request the government to hold implementation of 7th CPC award in abeyance in view of the anomalies which need to be resolved ". The signal to the units from service headquarters advised "In the interim, personnel are expected to display maturity and patience, and not be swayed by hearsay or speculative reports from any quarter." The MOD, insists "what all has been decided has to be implemented and legitimate grievances can be addressed later."

The MoD on the instructions of Parrikar, had informed the empowered committee headed by the Cabinet Secretary, in March 2016, that armed forces be kept above all other "fighting" arms of the government. It is not clear who other than the armed forces constitute 'fighting arms ' of the government. It is also not clear what action the MOD, or the Defence Minister took after the empowered committee failed to take note of the MOD advisory. Government decision to implement 7CPC escalates on the social media of armed forces personnel.

11 September 2016

Lt Gen Vijay Oberoi, former Vice Chief of Army Staff (COAS), calls decision by three Chiefs not to implement the MOD order "a very wise decision, done for the good of all ranks of their commands", and that "The three Chiefs need to be congratulated for taking a principled stand against an unjust award, and doing so in such a mature and balanced manner". "I doff my hat to you Sirs" he wrote.

The news of the action by the Chiefs of Staff, Oberoi says "reflects two important points. Firstly, it shows the government in very bad light indeed, and is actually a slur on the ability of the political leadership not to understand the extent of angst in all ranks of our military. Secondly, it shows the resolve of the Chiefs to fight a highly unjust award, planned, written and implemented by the bureaucracy by taking a nod from the political leadership". He cautions the armed forces not to fall prey to government "blandishments of all types, like more committees; ministerial interventions and even subtle threats, not to mention the usual 'how much the nation needs you' kind of words! They must desist and not fall for such ploys."

Captain Amarinder Singh, former Chief Minister of Punjab and officer in the Sikh Regiment, author, and current president of Punjab Congress Committee, on 11 September, supports the stand of the three services chiefs. He says "There is blatant discrimination with defence services in pay scales, which is condemnable(sic)" and that "Just because our soldiers are disciplined and dedicated to serving the nation, should not mean that they be discriminated against". The issues raised by the Chiefs, he said, were not about money but about status, and that defence services should be constitutionally put higher than the civil and police services.

On 7CPC recommendation to pay soldiers and officers serving in Saichen a far lesser allowance than civil servants posted in Assam, he said, "I have been seriously suggesting to the defence minister that the bureaucrats, who have habitually been creating hurdles and hindrances in providing better pay to the defence personnel, should be made to serve in Siachen for at least a day. " "Nobody among the bureaucrats knows about the hostile conditions in which our soldiers are made to work and that is the reason there is such a bias against the defence forces," he said.

He urged the Defence Minister 'to stand by the soldiers and get the anomalies sorted'.

12 September 2016

Air Chief Marshal Arup Raha, and Admiral Sunil Lanba, Navy Chief, met the Defence Minister Manohar Parrikar. The Army Chief who was away in Goa, is not present for this meeting. Parrikar, according to media reports, tells Services chiefs that the armed forces' reservations on the 7th CPC recommendations would be "looked into if found genuine". The three chiefs of the armed forces had, it seems, asked to meet with the PM much before 6 September without success. Main issue appears to be the government decision to make the armed forces subordinate to the police, in 'levels' and pay, and status.

13 September 2016

The Tribune in an editorial calls the action by the armed forces, seeking delay in implementation of the Seventh Central Pay Commission (CPC) till the anomalies are addressed, an "unusual step", which does not "auger well for the country". "It is rather strange" the editorial notes that, "the government has not satisfactorily addressed the grievances of the Armed Forces", which were explained to "13-member Empowered Committee of Secretaries at which the three Service Chiefs were present" and on which three Service Chiefs submitted a joint representation to the Prime Minister. The issues raised by the armed forces, including with the PM, which remain unaddressed, include: common pay matrix for the military and civilian employees; and resolution of anomalies in allowances, and pensions. The editorial notes that the armed forces continue to remain troubled by the governments decision to exclude Service officer from consideration of the 7CPC even though the armed forces comprise almost 30 per cent of the Central employees, same as the Railways, which had representation in the committee as did "the Indian Police Service with a strength of less than 4,700." It called on the government, "which is already on the back foot over not fully implementing One Rank, One Pension" to "accord top priority to satisfactorily resolve the issue". "Military personnel face the highest risk to their lives. Besides, the highest levels of proficiency, commitment and sense of sacrifice are demanded of them."

14 September 2016

Air Chief Marshal Arup Raha, Chairman Chief of Staff Committee (CoSC), in an official statement released by the MOD, said, "The 7th Pay Commission anomalies in respect of the Armed Forces were discussed with the Hon'ble Raksha Mantri in detail by the Service Chiefs and the members of the Armed Forces Pay Commission Cell. The Hon'ble Raksha Mantri is seized of all the issues and has assured to resolve them at the earliest. The Services are satisfied with the response."

15 September 2016

A large contingent of veterans led by Lt Gen S S Brar (retd), march to the office of Punjab Governor V P Singh Badnore and submit a memorandum, addressed to the President of India. The memorandum says "The community of veterans across the country fully endorses the stand taken by the Chiefs of Army, Navy and Air Force with regard to the recommendations of the seventh Central Pay Commission"

Capt Amarinder Singh joins the veterans march with Congress party members, including Ambika Soni, Asha Kumari and Harish Chaudhary. Later, Amrinder told reporters that the present situation was caused by "bias of the bureaucrats against the armed forces and the blind eye turned by the political parties running the government". "The brazen and blatant discrimination against the defence forces has been continuing ever since Independence." he said. "We constitute the largest share of employees and pensioners and we have no say in the decisions made by a handful of bureaucrats which are imposed on the Armed Forces." Capt Amarinder said "the lowering of our status in the Warrant of Precedence, lowering our pay scales vis-à-vis other government cadres, bringing it below the police and now the central police organisations is a deliberate attempt to belittle the armed forces". "Such repeated wrong steps on part of the government can only demoralize the defence forces", and that "India cannot afford a demoralized defence service with a belligerent China and mischievous Pakistan being next door neighbours", he said.

21 September 2016

Justice PB Bajanthri, Punjab and Haryana High Court, Chandigarh, in response to a petition by Lt Colonel Preetpal Singh Grewal, a serving officer, issued notice to the Ministry of Defence (MOD) to include representatives from the defence forces in the panel set up by the government on 12 September 2016 to examine anomalies in the 7CPC recommendations implemented by the government. The high court ordered that the anomalies committee shall take into account the views on anomalies affecting defence personnel.

18 September 2016

Four Pakistan trained terrorists infiltrate across the line of actual control (LOC) at night from bases in Pakistan-administered Kashmir and attack army brigade headquarters in Uri and kill 18 soldiers of the Dogra and Bihar regiments. The terrorist attack provokes nationwide outrage and exposes grave security and intelligence failure, at the operational, and national level.

12 October 2016

Defence Minister Manohar Parrikar said, "Yes, there are some anomalies in the 7th pay commission", and "I can assure the people of the country and our armed forces that I have personally taken up the matter with the Prime Minister". The disability pension, he said, " is just a draft now", he said. "No final order has been issued as yet, only a draft resolution has been put up on the website. We will examine and try to address all that can be addressed, and forward the same to the anomalies committee for their opinion." The resolution on the MOD website that the minister referred to, however, does not say it is a draft.

13 October 2016

The MOD in response to growing public criticism of the government's decision to implement a more favourable disability pension scheme called 'percentage based system', than the one implemented for the armed forces, called slab based system, issued a press release informing that the representation of the Service Headquarters seeking a disability pension scheme at par with the civilians, has been referred to "the Anomaly Committee of 7th CPC for consideration".

18 October 2016

Defence Minister Manohar Parrikar authorizes G.Mohan Kumar, IAS, Defence Secretary to issue of memo (No A/24577/CAO/CP Cell) tabulating rank equivalence between armed forces officers and select officers of the Armed Forces Headquarter Civil Service, a Group B service responsible for house keeping and secretarial functions in armed forces headquarters, and inter-service organizations. The memo is signed by V Anandarajan, Chief administrative Officer (CAO), Ministry Of Defence (MOD), under G.Mohan Kumar, IAS, Defence Secretary. Anandarajan, Joint Secretary, is an officer belonging to the Indian Revenue Service, income tax branch, of 1988 batch, on deputation with MOD. The memo is addressed to Staff Duties (SD) Directorate, Army headquarters, and equivalent directorates in the Air-force and Navy among others. In its last paragraph, the memo says it has the approval of the Raksha Mantri (Defence Minister Mohan Parrikar).^{[Para 5]}

Major generals, in the memo, are equated with AFHQ CS officers with 16 years' service as officers in group A, called Principal directors; Brigadiers with 24 years' service are equated with officers with 13 years' service, called Directors; Colonels with 18 years' service officers with 9 years' service at group A level, called Joint Directors. Lt colonels, though not mentioned in the memo, will, by implication, be equal to officers with 4 years' service. Majors, captains, and lieutenant by implication will be equal to group B, and clerical level posts.

In justification of memo cites' administrative orders' issued in 2003, 2005, and 2008. Navdeep Singh, an expert on armed forces pay, whom the MOD has previously consulted, says the letter are 'irrelevant'. The letter cited by The tabulation affect the status of tens of thousands of armed forces officers, specifically officers holding the ranks from lieutenant to major general. The tabulation which is opposed by armed forces headquarters, was issued 'unilaterally' and without prior consultation with Chiefs of staff, or the armed Forces headquarters.

The rank equivalence tabulation, and long opposed by the armed forces, contradicts the rank equivalence and levels in resolution dated 7 September 2016 promulgated in the Gazette. For example, lieutenant-colonel and its equivalents in the Air Force (wing commander) and Navy (commander), level 12 A, 13 years' service, according to the gazette, will become inferior in rank and status to officers of AFHQ CS, 'level 12', called joint directors (civil service time scale rank with 9 years of services) This would also undermine MOD letter issued in 2009 which placed lieutenant-colonels in Pay Band (PB) 4 with a grade pay of Rs 8000, in comparison with joint Directors who were in PB 3, with pay grade of 7600.

24 October 2016

Hindustan Times reported that the memo on rank equivalence between armed forces officers and army headquarter civil service dated 18 October authorized by Defence Minister Manohar Parrikar, has down graded armed forces ranks, and those of majors to the level of Group B section officers, and captains to the level of assistants, a group B non gazetted ministerial post in the AFHQCS, according to senior serving armed forces officer. The newspaper says it has "stoked controversy" and become a cause of growing resentment among armed forces officers, "at a time when the armed forces and the ministry have divergent views on the 7th Pay Commission report and the OROP".

"We have been stabbed in the back", a senior officer told the Hindustan Times. Serving officer in the army headquarters, complained that according to equation in the memo (No A/24577/CAO/CP) "a captain is equivalent to a civilian Group B section officer. This isn't mischief, but mischief-plus by bureaucrats.'" They alleged that memo is "an attempt to reverse clearly established protocols established by successive pay panel reports and court rulings"; is against the spirit of recommendations made by a Committee headed by Pranab Mukherjee after the 6th Pay Commission report; and that down gradation of armed forces ranks will widen the "civil-military rift" and affect morale.

25 October 2016

Defence Minister Manohar Parrikar on the sidelines of a naval commanders' conference told reporters that discrepancy in the rank equivalence caused by the MOD memo of 18 October 2016 would be corrected in a week and that "any disparity in rank structure of its officers with those in civil administration will be removed". He would, he said, "scrutinize the orders to detect anomalies that threaten to widen the civil-military divide". Retired Brigadier Gurmeet Kanwal, commenting on 18 October 2016 memo said "It is an incontrovertible fact that the status of armed forces has been progressively diluted over last few years. This creates bad blood between the civilian and military services". Brigadier Pradeep Sharma (retired) said "Rank equation has gone wonky. It's high time the government set things right and restore the status of defence officers". After the uproar in the armed forces, the MOD said the "entire issue", which was "a complicated one lingering for quite some time", would be re-examined by a committee with the aim to "resolve it once and for all".

27 October 2016

The MOD, two days after Monohar Parrikar, had said "there has been no downgrading or any change in the existing equivalence of the service ranks whatsoever", issue a press release saying that "there has been no down-gradation or any change in the existing equivalence of the Service ranks whatsoever". In the defence of the rank-equivalence the press release says "rank equivalence, is only for matters of assigning duties and functional responsibilities" and has no bearing "on civilian employees outside these offices of the Service HQrs," and that "there is no change in the rank structure or the status of the Armed Forces personnel". In justification the MOD press release says it had issued similar administrative memos in 1991 and 92, during the tenure of NN Vohra(1990–93) as defence secretary, and memos issued by Yogendra Narain in 2000, and Ajai Vikram Singh in 2004, and in 2005, when Anthony from Congress I was the defence minister. These administrative memo have been said to be 'irrelevant' to issues of rank equivalence. The press release ignores the fact that none of these memo met with armed forces approval, and that issues relating rank equivalence and status remain unresolved anomalies frequently flagged by the Chiefs of staff and retired Chiefs of the armed forces.

Armed forces officer respond to MOD denials with skepticism. Brigadier Gurmeet Kanwal said, " Such turf battle are not good for military morale". Lt General HS Panag, former Army commander Northern Command said, " these are battles that have to be fought by the three service chiefs". Brigadier Gurmeet Kanwal (Retd) tweeted, "PM exhorts nation to send Diwali 'sandesh' to soldiers. B'crats reduce disability pension n lower status vis-a-vis civilians. Happy Diwali!." It is view that is widespread in the armed forces.

Senior serving officer commenting on the issues raided by memo of 18 October 2016, told Quint, on conditions of anonymity, that "There can be no more than one parameter for 'equivalence'. How can there be separate equivalence for 'Functionality', 'Warrant of Precedence'; and based on 'Pay Scales/ Grade Pay' ? Accepting such multiple regimes is a deliberate act of causing confusion and subverting status as per convenience". The officer added that "it was important to scrutinise the mandate of AFHQ cadre" which was "meant to provide only secretarial support and had no executive authority or powers, they said comparing them to armed forces officers who have executive powers, exercise command over men in peace and war, and also have substantial judicial powers, is insane -- like comparing "chalk and cheese".

22 November 2016

Subhash Bhamre, Minister of State for Defence, in a written reply to question by Neeraj Shekhar a Rajya Sabha member informed that the BJP government had accepted the slab based system for determining disability pension for the armed forces, and different system, called 'percentage basis' for the civilians. 100 percent disability for the armed forces according to the minister was: officers (level 10- 18) Rs 27000 per-month; junior commissioned officers (JCOs) (level 6-9) 17000, and soldiers and NCOs Rs 12000. This recommendation was accepted by the BJP government, following 7CPC recommendation, and resolution issued on 30 September 2016. The disparities between the two systems the minister acknowledged has caused an "anomalous situation", and was referred to the "Anomaly Committee", following criticism that the scheme approved for the armed forces was discriminatory.

25 November 2016

Subhash Bhamre, Minister of State for Defence, in a written reply to a question by Sultan Ahmed, prompted by public concern about issue of asymmetries in the pay and rank between the armed forces and civilians, including police, informed the Lok Sabha, that 7th Central Pay Commission (CPC) had adopted the same the "principles and philosophy" it had "adopted in devising the Pay Matrix for civilian employees". And to address the issue of parity, "The Government accepted the Commission's recommendations on Minimum Pay, Fitment Factor, Index of Rationalization, Pay Matrices and general recommendations on pay with certain exceptions in Defence Pay Matrix, namely, (i)revision of Index of Rationalization of Level 13A (Brigadier) from 2.57 to 2.67; and (ii)addition of three stages in Level 12A (Lt Colonel), three stages in Level 13 (Colonel), and two stages in Level 13A (Brigadier)". The minister however, did not address, the related issue of the asymmetries in the ranks and levels, and of historical parities between the armed forces and police and defence civilians, which has not been addressed by the 7CPC or the government. The press release added that "As and when issues regarding anomalies in the pay of defence personnel are brought to notice, the same are examined by the Government, on case to case basis".

29 November 2016

Subhash Bhamre Minister of State for Defence in a written reply to a question by Rajeev Chandrasekhar about the controversial 18 October 2016 memo containing rank equivalence tabulation, in the Rajya Sabha said that the "Government has only reiterated the existing functional equivalence being followed at Service Headquarters for matters of assigning duties and responsibilities with respect to Armed Forces Headquarters Civil Service (AFHQ CS) officers posted at Service Headquarters". When asked in the Rajya sabha, whether the MOD was considering "correcting the discrepancies that have arisen as a result of this disturbance of rank equations", replied the question "does not arise". He did not comment on the fact that service headquarters are not in agreement with the imposed equivalence or that service chiefs have highlighted their dismay over the rank and level comparisons between armed forces officers and group A civil services.

2 December 2016

Voice of Ex-Serviceman an NGO representing personnel below officer rank (PBOR) moves petition in the Delhi High Court alleging that PBOR were discriminated against by the Seventh Pay Commission (7CPC). The plea seeks same rate of military service pay (MSP) for PBORs as awarded to officers; equal disability pension for all armed forces personnel irrespective of their rank; service up to 60 years' service; and time bound promotions for PBORs; three Assured Career Progressions; and participation in policy formulation on pay and allowances.

== See also ==
- One Rank One Pension
- Rank Pay
- Sixth Central Pay Commission
- Special Duty Allowance (SDA)
