= T. S. R. Subramanian v. Union of India =

Landmark decision of the Supreme Court of India

T.S.R. Subramanian v. Union of India
- Court: Supreme Court of India
- Full case name: T. S. R. Subramanian & Ors. versus Union of India & Ors.
- Decided: 31 October 2013
- Citations: W. P. (C) No. 82 of 2011; D. No. 4750-2011

Case opinions
- Decision by: K. S. Panicker Radhakrishnan

T. S. R. Subramanian & Ors. versus Union of India and Ors., was a landmark decision of the Supreme Court of India in which the Court ruled that civil servants were not bound to follow oral directives. The case began with a public interest civil writ petition filed before the Supreme Court of India and was decided in October 2013.

== Premise ==
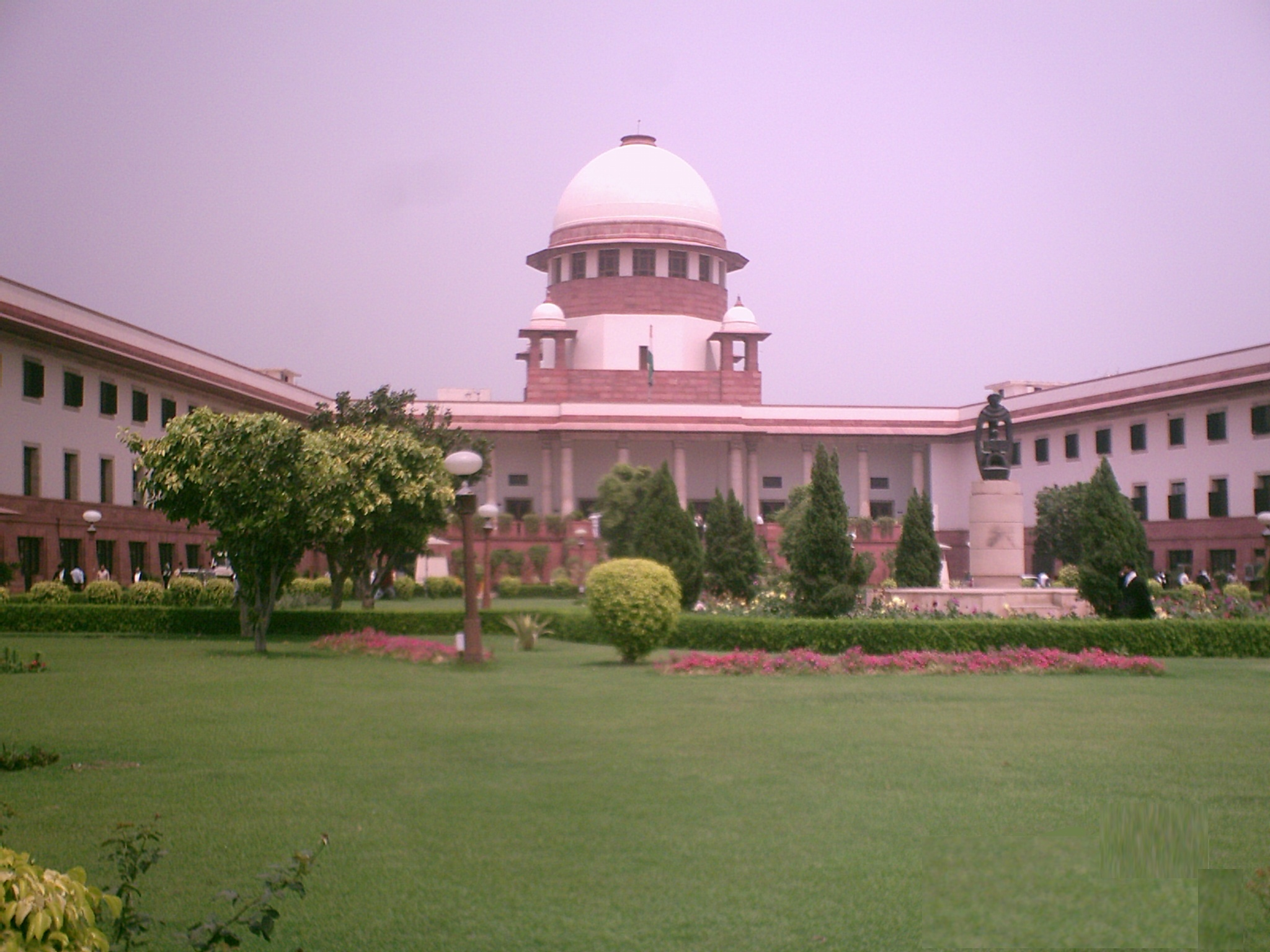
Building of the Supreme Court of India

The case was filed as a public interest civil writ petition by T. S. R. Subramanian, retired Indian Administrative Service (IAS) officer and former Cabinet Secretary; T. S. Krishnamurthy, retired IAS officer and former Chief Election Commissioner; N. Gopalaswami, retired IAS officer and former Chief Election Commissioner; Abid Hussain, retired IAS officer and former Indian ambassador to the United States; Ved Prakash Marwah, retired Indian Police Service (IPS) officer and former Manipur governor; Joginder Singh, retired IPS officer and former director of the Central Bureau of Investigation, and 77 others in 2011. It was heard by a division bench comprising justices K. S. Panicker Radhakrishnan and Pinaki Chandra Ghose from 2011 to 2013.

The petitioners were retired top civil servants from—among others—the IAS and the IPS. They sought mandatory court injunctions to support the independence of the various Indian civil services and their freedom from political interference, by requiring the Indian federal and state governments to implement the recommendations made by several commissions of review (including the Hota Commission): that oral instructions given by politicians to civil servants must be recorded in writing, that senior civil service appointments should be made for a fixed term, and that civil services boards should be established to advise on postings. In addition, politicians in state government were seen to have been transferring civil servants repeatedly.

== Judgment ==
The judgement of the Supreme Court of India

Major rulings in the case included:

- Officers of the IAS, other All India Services and other civil servants were not bound to follow oral directives, as they "undermine credibility".
- Establishment of a Civil Services Board (CSB), headed by the Cabinet Secretary at the national level and chief secretaries at the state level, to recommend transfers and postings of All India Services (the Indian Administrative Service, the Indian Forest Service and the Indian Police Service) officers.

== Reaction ==
The supreme court decision received a mostly-positive reaction and was considered a "major reform".

Indian Administrative Service Association secretary Sanjay Bhoosreddy said, "[we] support the judgement. It vindicates our stand. It will help in good governance across the country". According to Indian Forest Service Association president A. R. Chadha, the ruling would check arbitrary transfers and suspensions. A Bharatiya Janata Party secretary-general, Dharmendra Pradhan, said that it would "help bring greater transparency in [sic] the system". Pradhan added that the "decision should not hamper government functioning, especially development work being carried out by the government".

An Indian National Congress spokesperson, P. C. Chacko, disagreed: "[t]o discharge the responsibilities of the executive effectively, the power of transfer and posting of the officials should be with the government. For effective administration, the discretion should be with the political authority. Any infringement of this authority will not be good for the country,". The president of the Centre for Policy Research tweeted, "[o]n the face of it, supreme court is continuing its constitutional usurpation; and many orders are practically unworkable".
