= National Crisis Management Committee =

Indian government committee

A National Crisis Management Committee is a committee set up by the Government of India in the wake of a natural calamity for effective coordination and implementation of relief measures and operations. It is headed by Cabinet Secretary. A National Crisis Management Committee(NCMC) has been constituted in the Cabinet Secretariat. The composition of the committee is as under:- Cabinet Secretary Chairman, Secretary to Prime Minister Member, Secretary (MHA) Member, Secretary (MCD) Member, Director (IB) Member, Secretary (R&AW) Member, Secretary (Agri & Coopn.) Co-opted Member, An officer of Cabinet Secretariat. Convenor

== Sources ==
- Contingency Action Plan - National Policy
