= Special Duty Allowance =

Special Duty Allowance (SDA) is an allowance paid to officers of All India Services (AIS), including police officers, when posted in any of the seven states in Northeast India, and Ladakh, including in state capitals, and cities and towns like Guwahati, Aizawl, Shillong, Kohima, Leh and Kargil. The SDA rate is 37.5 percent of basic pay for AIS officers and 12.5 percent of basic pay for other employees. The SDA is one of the highest allowances paid to a government servant, and is higher than the Siachen allowance, a fixed amount paid to armed forces personnel posted in Siachen.

== 6 CPC ==
Following the recommendations of the Sixth Central Pay Commission (6CPC) the Congress (I) Government led by Prime Minister Manmohan Singh granted SDA to all "AIS officers and Central Government employees having all India transfer liability on their posting to any station in the North Eastern Region from outside the region". It was meant to "offset the security environment and the difficult working and living conditions prevailing in North Eastern Region".

The 6CPC reiterated that SDA would continue at the existing rates (12.5 percent). In its 'analysis' it noted that it "should be paid to all Central Government employees on their posting on transfer to any North East Region irrespective of whether the transfer is from outside the North East Region or from another area of that region. The condition that the employees have all India transfer liability should also be dispensed with". The Government linked the SDA to inflation, mandating that it " shall automatically increase by 25% whenever the Dearness Allowance payable on the revised pay bands goes up by 50percent." The Government on the recommendations of the 6CPC also granted Special (Duty) Allowance to Government employees posted in Ladakh, as they "face similar difficulties" as in the North East India.

The 6CPC did not recommend SDA for Group C and D employees on the grounds that they did not have "all India transfer liability", a criteriona for being eligible for SDA. The 6CPC in its analysis of the issue noted that "The situation has become even more complex due to a large number of court cases due to which Group C & D employees of certain Departments are in receipt of this allowance on account of orders of the Courts/Tribunals. Some modifications in the scheme of this allowance are, therefore, necessary."

== 7CPC ==
7CPC found that existing rate of Special Duty Allowance (SDA) was 37.5 percent of Basic Pay for AIS officers, in comparison with 12.5 recommended by 6CPC, and 12.5 percent of Basic Pay for other employees. The 7CPC, which submitted its report in November 2015, recommended that "SDA for AIS officers should be paid at the rate of 30 percent of Basic Pay and for other civilian employees at the rate of 10 percent of Basic Pay" It reiterated the justification given by the 6CPC noting that it "is of the view that AIS officers are allotted cadres, irrespective of their choice, and they are required to work in these cadres for considerable periods of time. As such, a higher rate of SDA for them is justified".

The Special Duty Allowance (SDA) at 30 percent of the pay, for an Indian Police Service Officer with 13 years service works out Rs 35,550, 14 years of service to Rs 39,330, for 17 years service to Rs 43260, and for 22 years service to Rs 54,660. Armed Forces are not eligible for SDA. The Siachen allowance recommended by 7CPC, for officers and soldiers serving in Siachen Glacier, in comparison, is Rs 42500 for officers, and 30,000 for JCO/NCO respectively. The Armed Forces headquarters dissatisfied with the 7CPC recommendations have said that "Siachen cannot be equal or lower to Guwahati when deciding on the “hardship” factor". They have recommended a new "hardship matrix" to decide allowances for the armed forces. They have recommended 65 percent of salary as Siachen allowance.

The Government in the face of criticism decided to hold in abeyance the implementation of the recommendation on all allowances by the 7CPC. On 29 August 2016, it constituted a separate allowances committee to review recommendations on all allowances, including SDA, made by the 7CPC.

== See also ==
- Pay Commission
- 7th Central Pay Commission (CPC) and Defence Forces
