= T. S. R. Subramanian =

Indian politician

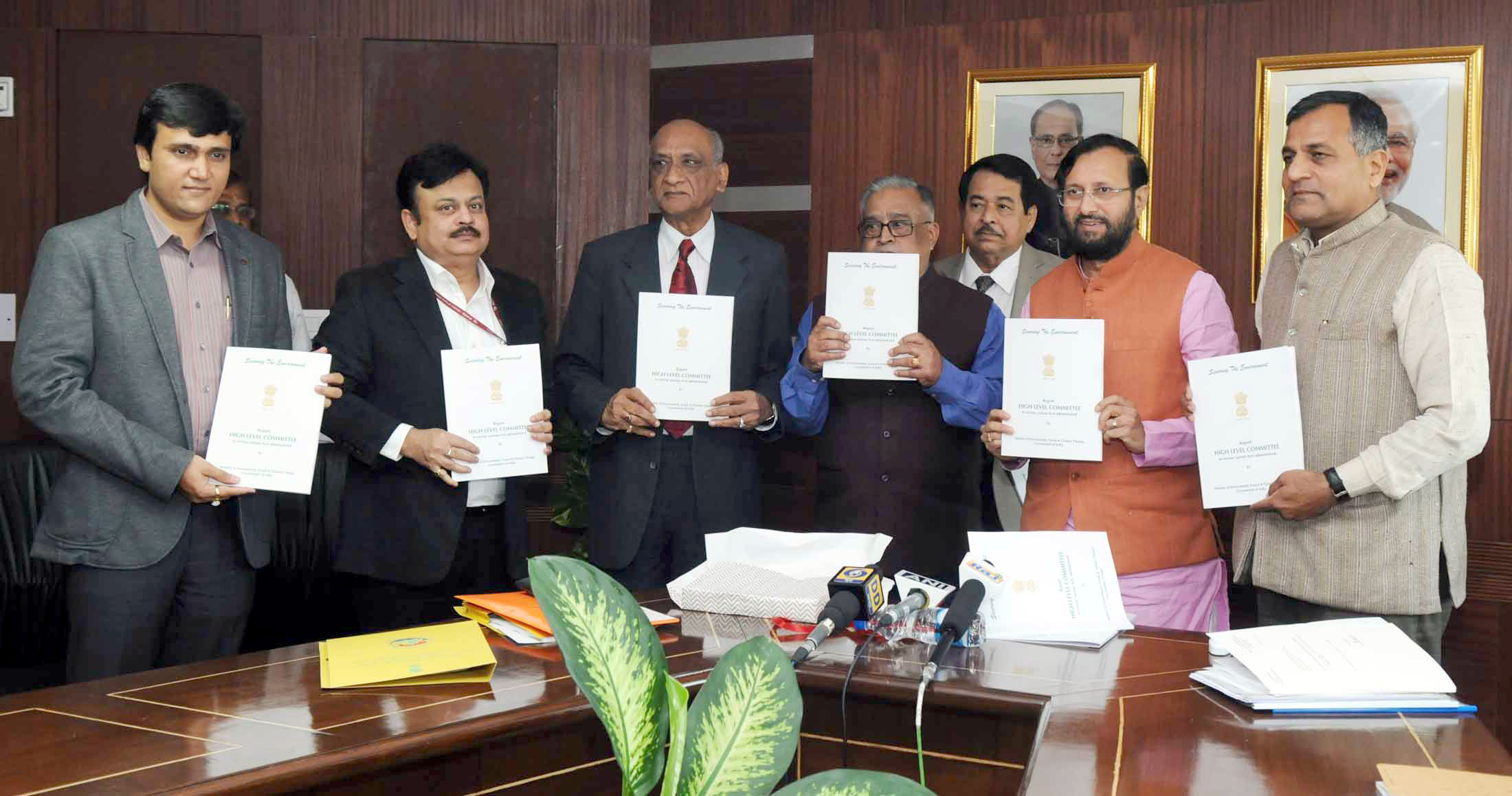
- T. S. R. Subramanian (fourth from left) in November 2014

Cabinet Secretary of India
- In office 1 August 1996 – 31 March 1998
- Preceded by: Surendra Singh
- Succeeded by: Prabhat Kumar

Personal details
- Born: Thirumanilaiyur Sitapati Ramana Subramanian; 11 December 1938 Thanjavur, Madras Presidency, India
- Died: 26 February 2018 (aged 79) New Delhi, India
- Education: Calcutta University; Harvard University; Imperial College London
- Occupation: Civil servant

Thirumanilaiyur Sitapati Ramana Subramanian (11 December 1938 – 26 February 2018) was an Indian bureaucrat who served as the cabinet secretary of India from August 1996 to March 1998. He was a 1961 batch Indian Administrative Service officer from Uttar Pradesh Cadre.

== Early life and education ==
He was born into a middle class Tamil family and had spent much of his schooling days in Thanjavur, Tamil Nadu. Subramanian has a master's degree from Calcutta University, and has studied at the Imperial College London (officially Imperial College of Science, Technology and Medicine). He also held a master's degree in Public Administration from Harvard University.

== Career ==
Subramanian served in the Indian Administrative Service, where he held various positions including that of Cabinet Secretary (1 August 1996 to 31 March 1998), the highest post in the Indian administration and the post of Secretary in the Ministry of Textiles. He was Non-Executive Director of HCL Technologies from September 1999 to November 2011. He was a founder member and former Chancellor of the Shiv Nadar University. He held directorships for a few companies like HCL and SABMiller. He was also Founder Chairperson, VidyaGyan Leadership Academy & Trustee, Shiv Nadar Foundation.

== Remarks ==
On 31 October 2013, the Supreme Court's decision in T. S. R. Subramanian v. Union of India drastically reduced political pressure on top bureaucrats by ruling that they must get an assured minimum tenure in posting. Additionally, the Court held that civil servants were not bound to follow oral directives from the Government. "Fixed tenure of bureaucrats will promote professionalism, efficiency and good governance," bench observed. "Much of the deterioration in the functioning of bureaucracy is due to political interference," the SC said. The SC also directed the centre and state governments to pass an order within three months on giving fixed tenure to civil servants. The PIL filed by 83 retired bureaucrats including former cabinet secretary T S R Subramanian seeking its directions for insulating bureaucracy from political interference. "This is a landmark judgement. Public servants are not private servants," Subramanian said.

== Works ==
- India at Turning Point: The Road to Good Governance ISBN 9788129130877
- GovernMint In India: An Inside View (2009) ISBN 9788129114822
- Journeys Through Babudom and Netaland: Governance in India (2004) ISBN 9788129105875
