= K. M. Chandrasekhar =

29th Cabinet Secretary of India

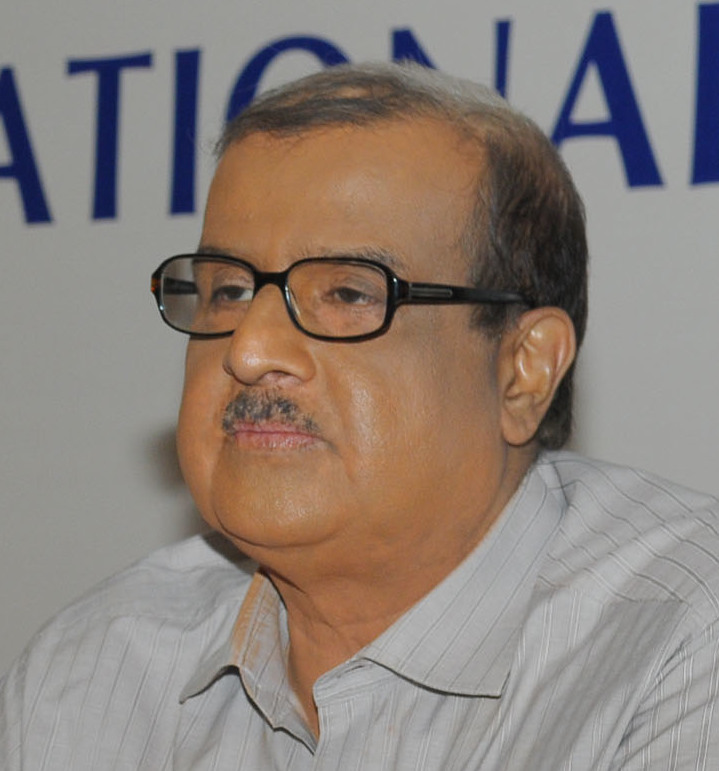

Vice Chairperson of Kerala State Planning Board
- In office 22 July 2026 – Incumbent
- Preceded by: V. K. Ramachandran

Vice Chairperson of Kerala State Planning Board
- In office 27 June 2011 – 25 May 2016
- Preceded by: Prabhat Patnaik
- Succeeded by: V. K. Ramachandran

29th Cabinet Secretary of India
- In office 14 June 2007 – 14 June 2011
- Prime Minister: Manmohan Singh
- Preceded by: B. K. Chaturvedi
- Succeeded by: Ajit Seth

Personal details
- Born: K M Chandrasekhar; 20 February 1948 (age 78) Kerala, India
- Spouse: Jaya Chandrasekhar
- Education: University of Delhi; University of Leeds

K. M. Chandrasekhar (born 20 February 1948) is a retired Indian civil servant who served as the 29th Cabinet Secretary of India from 2007 to 2011 under Prime Minister Manmohan Singh. A 1970 batch Indian Administrative Service officer of the Kerala cadre, he served as the Vice Chairperson of the Kerala State Planning Board from 2011 to 2016 during the government of Chief Minister Oommen Chandy and was reappointed to the post on 22 July 2026. In 2023, he was conferred the Kerala Sree Award, the third-highest civilian honour of the Government of Kerala.

== Early life and education ==
K. M. Chandrasekhar was born in Kerala to Ittyanath Thangamani from Ittyanath family Villadom, Thrissur and Kesava Menon, who was Chairman of the Railway Service Commission. He is the nephew of I. K. K. Menon, the eminent Malayalam writer who also served as the Secretary to the Election Commission of India (ECI). After graduating from college, he got an MA in history from the University of Delhi. He then earned his M.A. in Management Studies from the University of Leeds.

== Career ==
Chandrasekhar worked in the Indian Administrative Service from 1970 to 2011. During the last four years of his career, he held the highest position achievable in the Indian civil services, that of Union Cabinet Secretary, reporting directly to Prime Minister Manmohan Singh. After his retirement in 2011, he was offered a position equivalent to Cabinet Minister in his home State, Kerala, as Vice Chairman of the State Planning Board, which he held for the next five years until 2016. He has been Revenue Secretary in the Ministry of Finance, Government of India, and Finance Secretary in his State Government. In the Ministry of Commerce, he has worked as Chairman of the Spices Board (of which he was founder chairman), as Joint Secretary (Trade Policy Division) in the Ministry and in two diplomatic assignments abroad. He is on the Boards of ten companies, eight of them in the Tata Group and the others in the health care sector. He has been Chairman of the Federal Bank, President of a medical research institute and hospital under the Department of Science and Technology, Government of India (the Sri Chithra Institute of Medical Sciences and Technology, Trivandrum) and currently chairs, in an elected capacity, an economic think tank, teaching and research institution, the Centre for Development Studies, Trivandrum, affiliated to the Jawaharlal Nehru University, New Delhi. He is also Honorary Adviser to an Ayurvedic institution, the Arya Vaidya Sala, Kottakkal. His memoir 'As Good as My Word' is published by HarperCollins India in December 2022 and he is now working on his second book.

== Personal life ==
Chandrasekhar is married to Jaya, who taught English language and literature. They have a daughter.

Order of precedence
Preceded by B. K. Chaturvedi	Order of Precedence of India as Cabinet Secretary of India; June 2007-June 2011	Succeeded by Ajit Seth
