= B. K. Chaturvedi =

Retired Indian civil servant and 28th Cabinet Secretary of India

B. K. Chaturvedi IAS
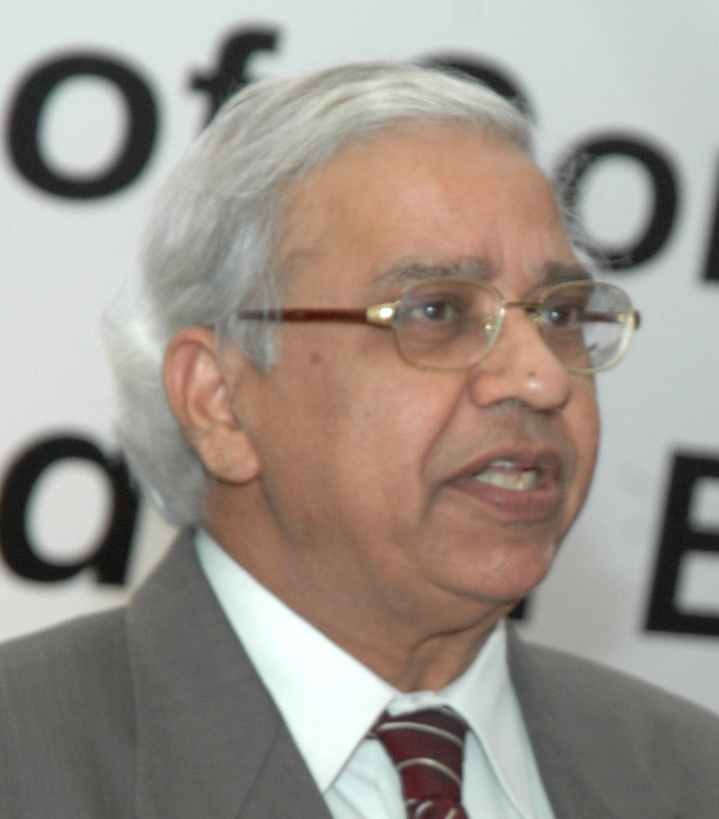
- Chaturvedi in 2007

Cabinet Secretary
- In office 14 June 2004 – 13 June 2007
- Prime Minister: Manmohan Singh
- Preceded by: Kamal Pande
- Succeeded by: K. M. Chandrasekhar

Secretary, Ministry of Petroleum and Natural Gas
- In office 2 April 2002 – 14 June 2004
- Minister: Ram Naik; Mani Shankar Aiyar
- Preceded by: V. N. Kaul
- Succeeded by: S. C. Tripathi

Secretary, Department of Secondary and Higher Education
- In office 1 December 2001 – 2 April 2002
- Minister: Murli Manohar Joshi

Secretary, Department of Elementary Education and Literacy
- In office 23 July 2001 – 1 December 2001
- Minister: Murli Manohar Joshi

Secretary, Department of Women and Child Development
- In office 1 June 2000 – 23 July 2001
- Minister: Murli Manohar Joshi

Personal details
- Born: 9 July 1944 (age 81) Uttar Pradesh
- Awards: Padma Bhushan (2010)

B. K. Chaturvedi is an Indian civil servant. He is former cabinet secretary, Government of India. He was awarded the Padma Bhushan in 2010 for his contribution to the field of civil services. He belongs to 1966 batch of the Indian Administrative Service (IAS).

== Early life ==
B. K. Chaturvedi was born in Uttar Pradesh. He holds a master's degree in Physics from Allahabad University, with specialization in Electronics. He studied Public Administration from Manchester University, U.K. (1978). He was member of Planning Commission.

== Career ==
Before joining the IAS, Chaturvedi was a professor of physics at the Motilal Nehru Regional Engineering College, Allahabad.

In 2004, the Prime Minister of India, Manmohan Singh, picked up 1966 batch IAS, Chaturvedi from Allahabad as the top bureaucrat of the country.

He was a Member, Planning Commission, Government of India. He has been a Member, Thirteenth Finance Commission since November 2007.
