= Dharma Vira =

Indian politician

Dharma Vira OBE
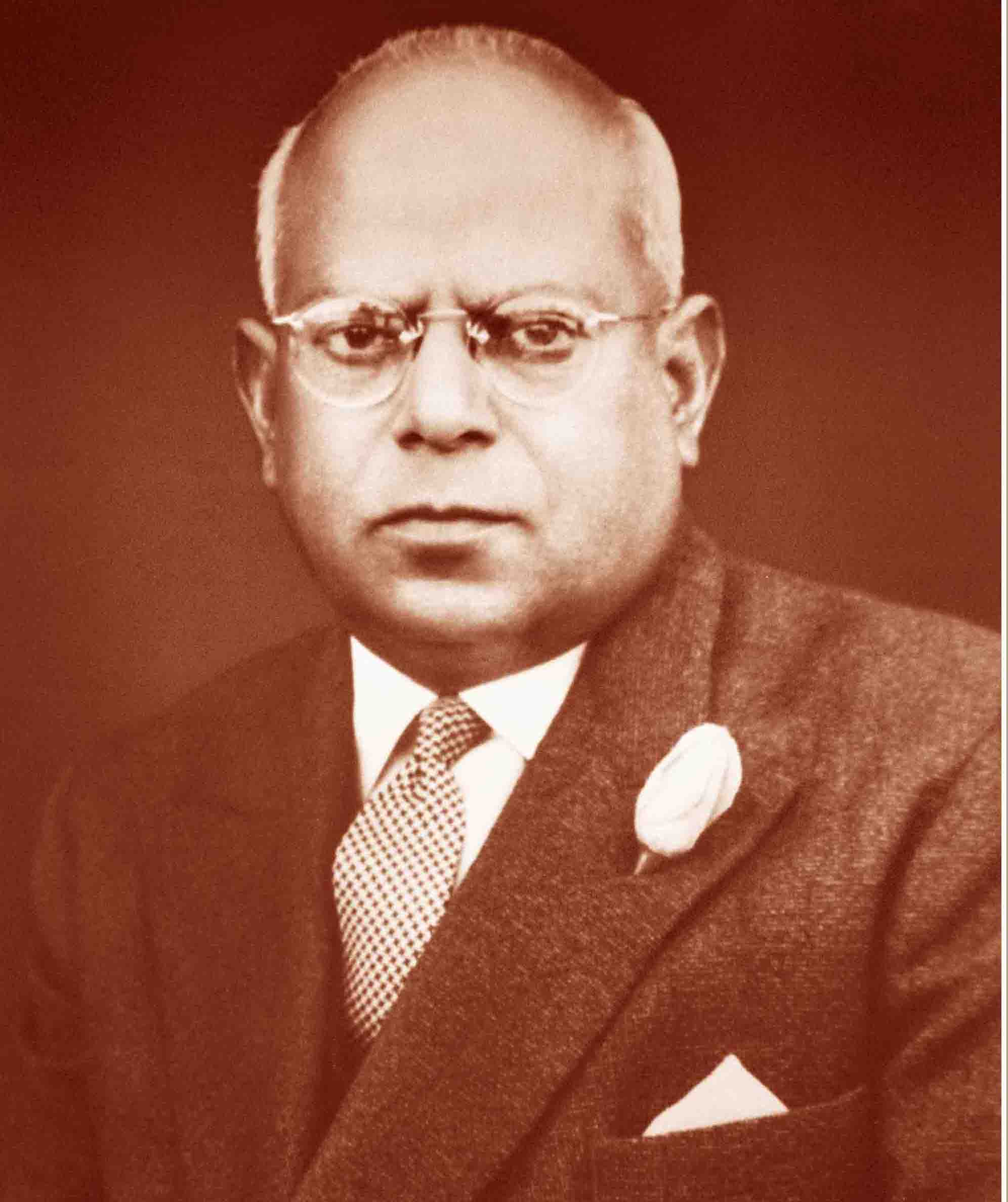
- Dharma Vira in January 1966

5th Governor of Mysore
- In office 23 October 1970 – 1 February 1972
- Chief Minister: Veerendra Patil
- Preceded by: Gopal Swarup Pathak
- Succeeded by: Mohanlal Sukhadia

5th Governor of West Bengal
- In office 1 June 1967 – 1 April 1969
- Chief Minister: Ajoy Mukherjee; Prafulla Chandra Ghosh
- Preceded by: Padmaja Naidu
- Succeeded by: Deep Narayan Sinha (acting)

1st Governor of Haryana
- In office 1 November 1966 – 14 September 1967
- Chief Minister: B. D. Sharma; Birender Singh
- Preceded by: Office Established
- Succeeded by: Birendra Narayan Chakraborty

7th Governor of Punjab
- In office 27 June 1966 – 1 June 1967
- Chief Minister: Ram Kishan; Giani Gurmukh Singh Musafir; Gurnam Singh
- Preceded by: Sardar Ujjal Singh
- Succeeded by: Mehar Singh (Acting)

8th Cabinet Secretary of India
- In office 18 November 1964 – 27 June 1966
- Prime Minister: Lal Bahadur Shastri; Gulzarilal Nanda (Interim); Indira Gandhi
- Preceded by: S. S. Khera
- Succeeded by: D. S. Joshi

Personal details
- Born: 20 January 1906 Bijnor, United Provinces, British India
- Died: 16 September 2000 (aged 94) New Delhi, India
- Spouse: Dayavati Ganga
- Relations: wrong information
- Parent(s): Raja Jwala Prasad, Bhagyati Devi
- Education: University of London; Muir Central College
- Awards: Padma Vibhushan

Dharma Vira (20 January 1906 – 16 September 2000) was an Indian civil servant and politician who served as the governor of Punjab, Haryana, West Bengal and Karnataka. Vira also served as a Cabinet Secretary of the Government of India.

== Early life ==
Dharma Vira was born in Bijnor on 20 January 1906, the son of Raja Jwala Prasad and Bhagyati Devi. He studied at Muir Central College in Allahabad, before going to London to read for the ICS examinations at the School of Oriental Studies (now the School of Oriental and African Studies) between 1929 and 1930. He passed the examinations in October 1930, and returned to India in November.

He married Dayavati Ganga Ram in 1932. He was a resident magistrate in Uttar Pradesh, but from 1941 became more involved in central Indian government affairs.

== Career ==
He became Deputy Chief Controller of Imports during the Second World War, and was Textile Commissioner for India in 1945.

After Independence, he worked closely with Jawaharlal Nehru, and was Joint Secretary to the Indian Cabinet in 1947. He then became Principal Private Secretary to Jawaharlal Nehru, 1950–51, and Commercial Adviser to the Indian High Commissioner in London, 1951–3.

In 1954, he was appointed Ambassador to Czechoslovakia, in which capacity he served until 1956. On his return to India he served as Secretary to the Ministry of Rehabilitation until 1962 and was Secretary to the Ministry of Works, Housing and Supply in 1962.

From 1963 to 1964 he was Chief Commissioner of Delhi and then from 1964 to 1966 Cabinet Secretary and Secretary to Union Council of Ministers and became Chairman of the Atomic Energy Commission.

He served as Governor of:

- Punjab and Haryana, 1966–67
- West Bengal 1967-69
- Karnataka (Mysore),1969–72

and was Chairman of the National Police Commission, 1977–83. Dharam Vira served as the President of the Bharat Scouts and Guides from November 1973 to September 1976.

== Awards ==
- He was appointed an OBE in the 1946 New Year Honours.
- He was awarded the Padma Vibhushan, the second-highest Indian civilian award, by the Government of India in 1999.

== Death ==
He died on 16 September 2000.
