= Pradeep Kumar Sinha =

Chairman of ICICI Bank and former Cabinet Secretary of India

Pradeep Kumar Sinha IAS
- Pradīpa Kumāra Sinhā
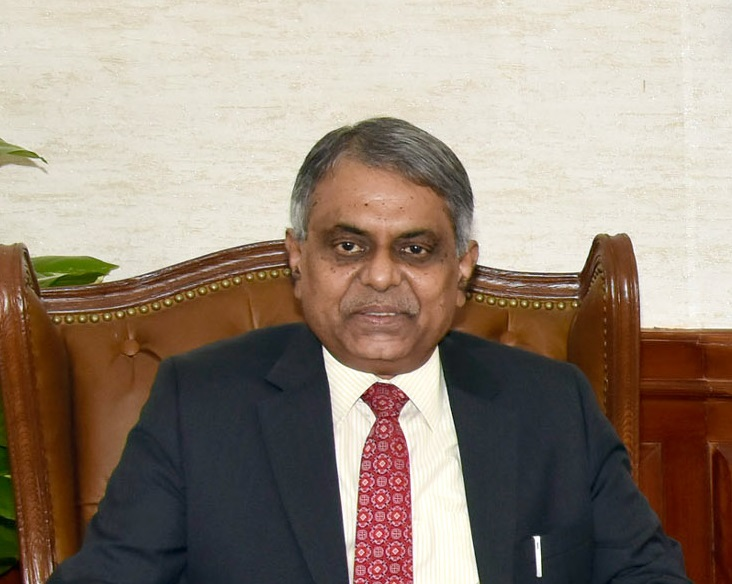
- Sinha in 2017

Chairman of ICICI Bank
- Incumbent
- Assumed office 1 July 2024
- Appointed by: ICICI Bank Board of Directors
- Prime Minister: Narendra Modi
- Preceded by: G.C. Chaturvedi

Principal Advisor to the Prime Minister
- In office 11 September 2019 – 16 March 2021
- Appointed by: Appointments Committee of the Cabinet

31st Cabinet Secretary of India
- In office 13 June 2015 – 30 August 2019
- Appointed by: Appointments Committee of the Cabinet
- Preceded by: Ajit Seth
- Succeeded by: Rajiv Gauba

Shipping Secretary of India
- In office 29 February 2012 – 31 June 2013
- Appointed by: Appointments Committee of the Cabinet

Power Secretary of India
- In office 1 July 2013 – 1 June 2015
- Appointed by: Appointments Committee of the Cabinet

Personal details
- Born: Pradeep Kumar Sinha; 18 July 1955 (age 71) Delhi, India
- Education: St. Stephen's College, Delhi; Delhi School of Economics; Delhi University
- Occupation: IAS officer
- Profession: Civil servant

Pradeep Kumar Sinha (born 18 July 1955; IAST: Pradīpa Kumāra Sinhā; Hindi: प्रदीप कुमार सिन्हा) is a retired 1977 batch Indian Administrative Service officer of the Uttar Pradesh cadre, who is currently serving as Chairman of ICICI Bank and previously served as the 31st Cabinet Secretary of India. Prior to this he also served as the Power Secretary of India, and Shipping Secretary of India.

On August 30, 2019 Sinha was appointed as Officer on Special Duty in the Prime Minister's Office. And on 11 September 2019, he was appointed as Principal Advisor to Prime Minister of India, Narendra Damodardas Modi. He resigned from the aforementioned post on 16 March 2021 citing personal reasons.

== Education ==
Sinha is an economics graduate, and holds a postgraduate degree in economics He holds an MPhil degree as well.

== Career ==
Sinha has served in various key posts in both the Government of India and the Government of Uttar Pradesh, such as Principal Secretary (Irrigation), commissioner of Varanasi division, Investment Commissioner of Uttar Pradesh, additional CEO of Greater Noida, additional resident commissioner of Uttar Pradesh, the district magistrate and collector of districts of Agra and Jaunpur, secretary of Uttaranchal Development Authority and as the vice chairman of Meerut Development Authority in the Uttar Pradesh government, and as the Cabinet Secretary of India, Union Power Secretary, Union Shipping Secretary, special secretary and financial advisor in the Ministry of Petroleum and Natural Gas, joint secretary in the Ministry of Youth Affairs and Sports in the Indian government.

=== Shipping Secretary ===
Sinha was appointed as the Union Shipping Secretary by the prime minister-headed Appointments Committee of the Cabinet (ACC) in February 2012, he assumed office on 1 February 2012, and demitted it on 31 June 2013.

=== Power Secretary ===
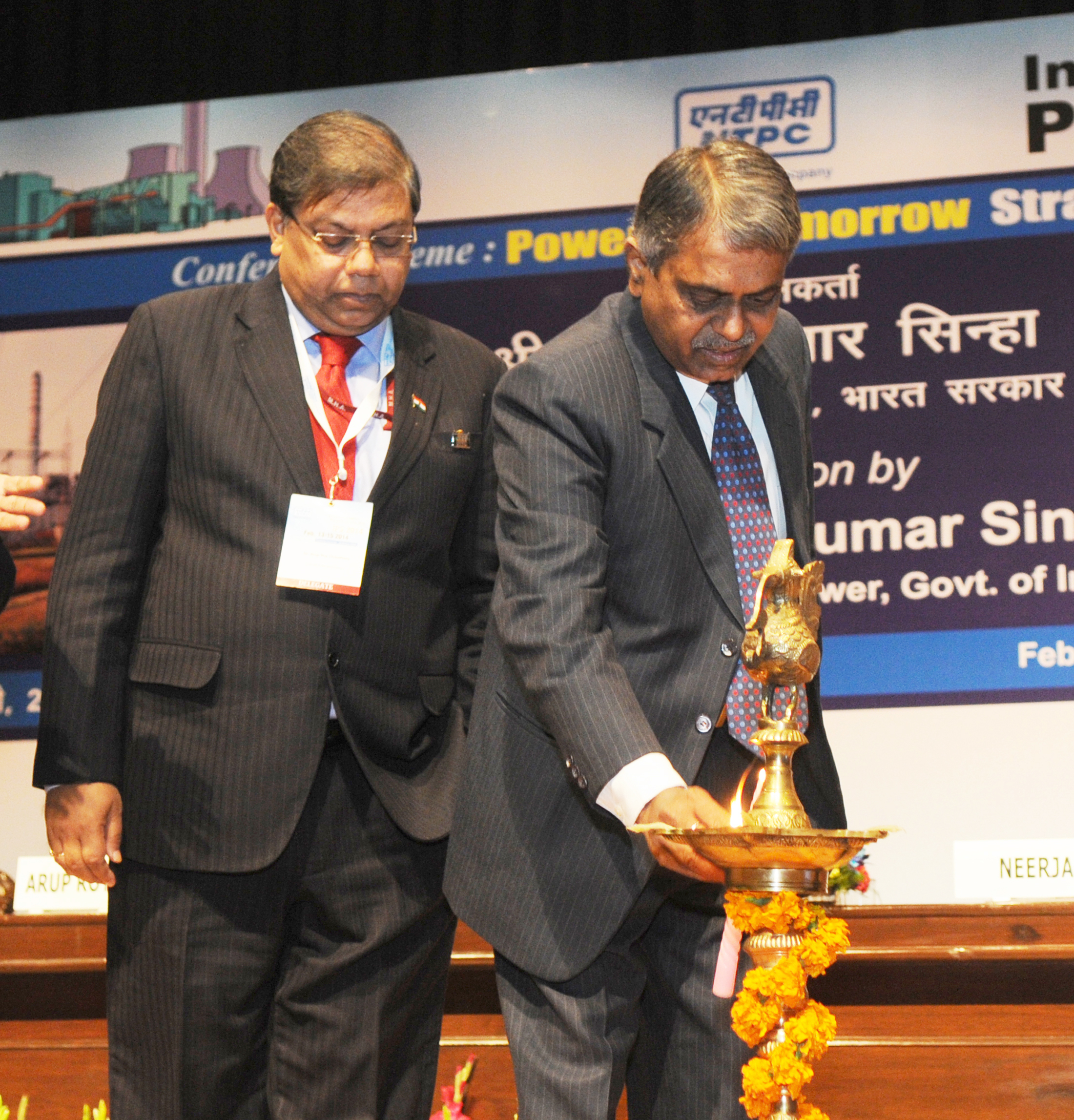
Sinha lighting the lamp to inaugurate Indian power stations in 2014

Sinha was appointed as the Union Power Secretary by the ACC in June 2013, he assumed office on 1 July 2013, and demitted it on 1 June 2015, when he was designated to become the Cabinet Secretary of India.

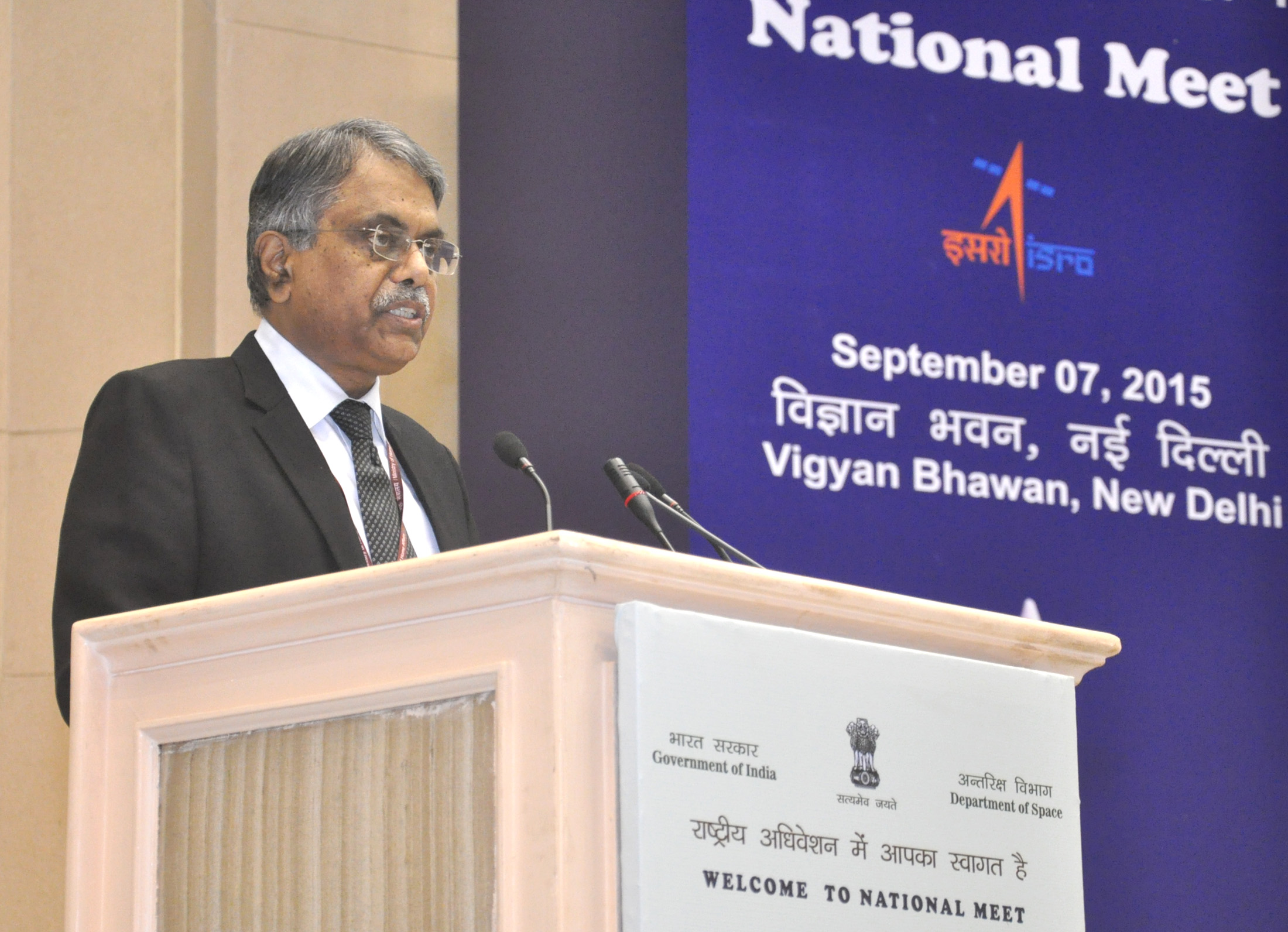
Sinha addressing a meet in New Delhi in September 2015

=== Cabinet Secretary ===
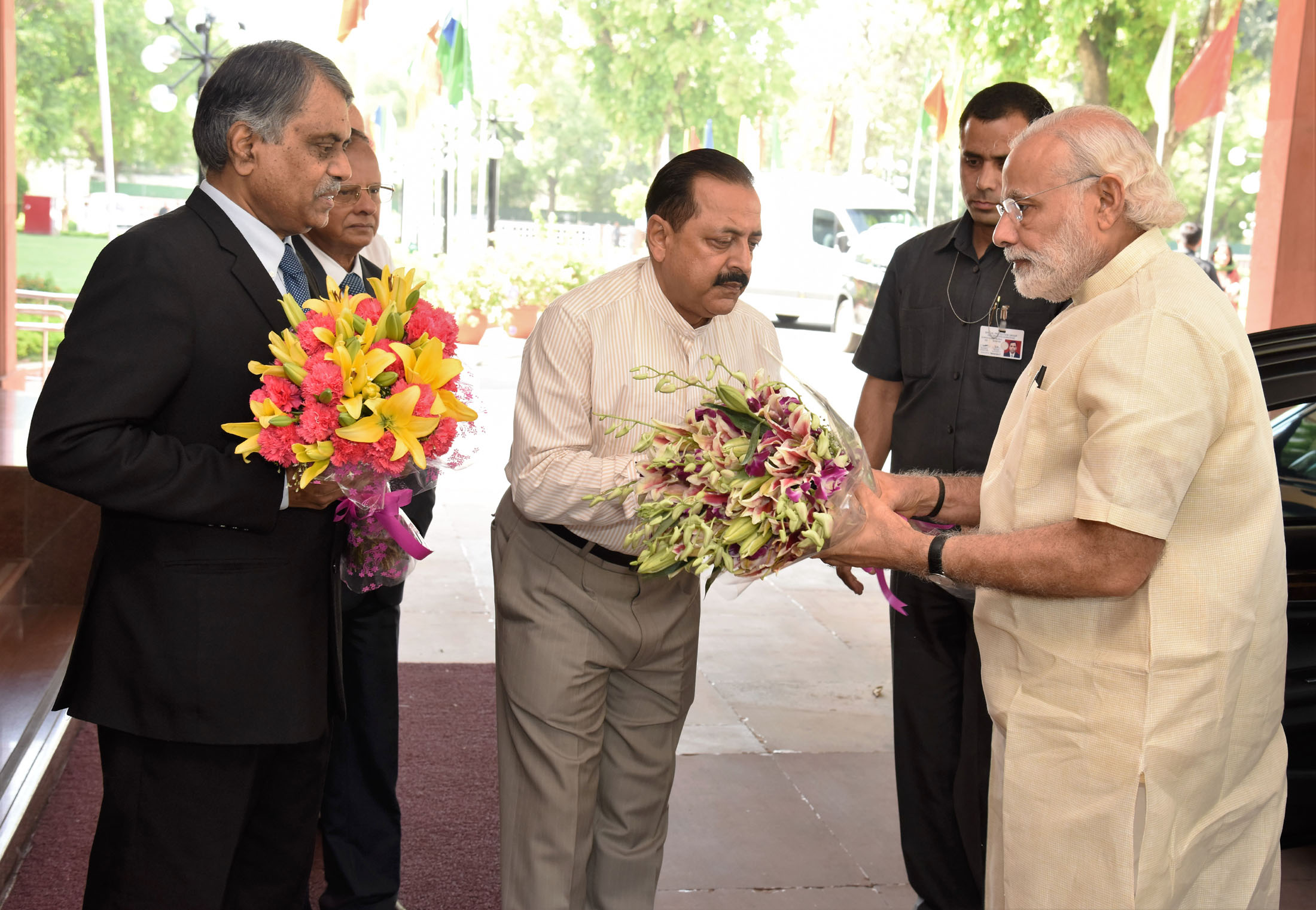
Sinha and Jitendra Singh receiving the Prime Minister of India, Narendra Modi

Sinha was appointed the Cabinet Secretary of India on 29 May 2015 by the ACC. He succeeded Ajit Seth. He served as an officer of special (OSD), in the rank of secretary, in the Cabinet Secretariat till Seth's retirement, formally taking charge as Cabinet Secretary on 13 June 2015.

The union government constituted a selection committee headed by Cabinet Secretary P.K. Sinha for the shortlisting of candidates for Reserve Bank India governorship following the end of Raghuram Rajan's term in September 2016. Urjit Patel was appointed as Governor of RBI, with effect from 4 September 2016.

On 25 April 2017, Sinha got an extension of one year as Cabinet Secretary. Sinha was granted another one year extension in May 2018 by the ACC.

During his tenure as the Cabinet Secretary, Sinha, has been widely regarded as one of the most powerful people in India.

Government offices
Preceded by Ajit Seth	Cabinet Secretary; 2015-2019	Succeeded by Rajiv Gauba
