= Raja Jwala Prasad =

Indian civil engineer, and Pro Vice Chancellor

Raja Jwala Prasad (1872 – 16 September 1944) was an Indian civil engineer, and Pro Vice Chancellor (1936–1940) of Banaras Hindu University. He was the father of Indian bureaucrat Dharma Vira and philanthropist Sumitra Charat Ram.

== Life ==
Jawala Prasad was born in Mandawar town of Bijnor district of Uttar Pradesh. He studied engineering from Thomason Civil Engineering College, Roorkee (now IIT Roorkee), graduating in 1900. He joined the Irrigation Department and retired as chief engineer in Uttar Pradesh. He was responsible for the Ganga Canal Grid Scheme constructed in 1924. The British government honored him with the title of Raja. After retiring from government service in 1930, he became the Pro Vice Chancellor of Banaras Hindu University. In 1937, he was chairman of a committee to reorganize Thomason College of Engineering Roorkee, though this reorganization was not carried out until after Independence. He died on 16 September 1944.

He planned the campus of BHU and supervised its construction. He helped Madan Mohan Malaviya considerably in collecting donations for the university.
