= C. R. Krishnaswamy Rao Sahib =

Indian civil servant and government official

C. R. Krishnaswamy Rao
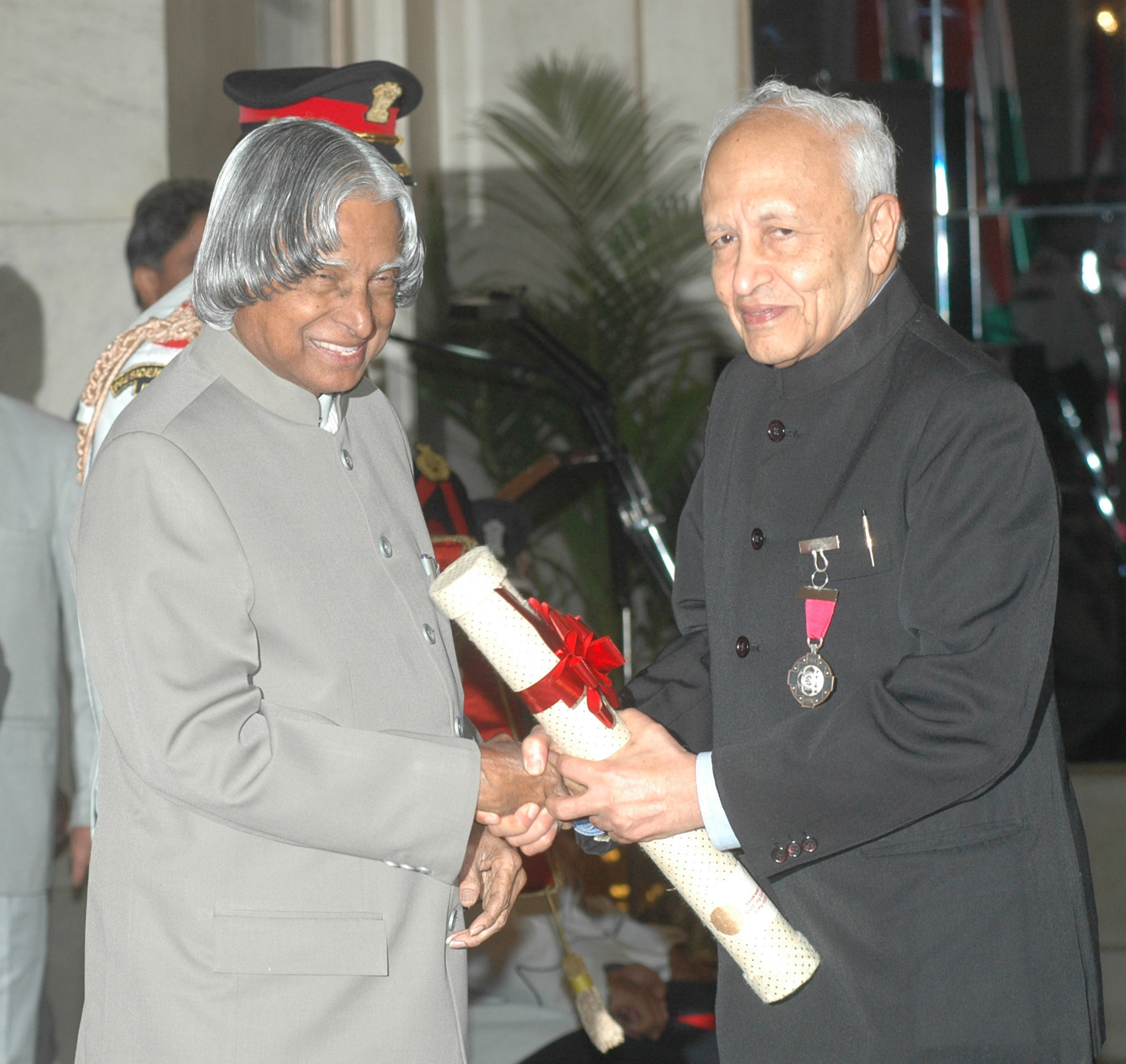
- President Dr. A.P.J. Abdul Kalam presenting the Padma Vibhushan to Krishnaswamy Rao in 2006

15th Cabinet Secretary of India
- In office 30 April 1981 – 8 February 1985
- Prime Minister: Indira Gandhi; Rajiv Gandhi
- Preceded by: S S Grewal
- Succeeded by: P. K. Kaul

Personal details
- Born: Colathur Rama Krishnaswamy Rao Sahib; 2 February 1927 Madras, British India
- Died: 12 February 2013 (aged 86) Madras, Tamil Nadu, India
- Spouse: Lalitha
- Education: Presidency College, Chennai
- Awards: Padma Vibhushan (2006), Great Maratha Award (2009)

Colathur Rama Krishnaswamy Rao Sahib (2 February 1927 – 12 February 2013) was an Indian civil servant who served as 15th Cabinet Secretary of India from 1981-1985. He also served as the Secretary to Prime Minister Charan Singh. when Indira Gandhi became the Prime Minister of India. He was awarded the second highest civilian honor of India, Padma Vibhushan in 2006, besides the Great Maratha Award in 2009. His maternal grandfather was R. Ramachandra Rao, Collector of Nellore, who helped Srinivasa Ramanujan during the latter's formative years.

== Life ==
Krishnaswamy Rao Sahib was born in a prominent Deshastha Madhva Brahmin family on 2 February 1927 in Madras, British India. The family is connected to Arni Jagir family, Rao Sahib belongs to the junior branch of the Colathur family. Rao Sahib became a family title when the Sultanate of Bijapur conferred it on his ancestor Vedaji Bhaskar Rao Pant. His maternal grandfather was R. Ramachandra Rao, Collector of Nellore, who helped Srinivasa Ramanujan during the latter's formative years. Rao Sahib attended P.S. Higher Secondary School before receiving Bachelor of Science in physics from the Presidency College, Chennai. Rao Sahib joined Indian Administrative Service on 1 February 1950.

== Accolades ==
He was also a great visionary. Dr. A P J Abdul Kalam credits him with propelling the idea of Integrated Guided Missile Programme of India during the 1980s, when there was tremendous criticism from the Armed forces that, not a single missile had been successfully developed so far.

That was the time, Shri Krishnaswamy Rao Sahib made a remark which is still ringing in my mind. He said "Hon'ble Minister sir, I heard all the discussion. But I would like to convey one thing. The time has come, we have to take a decision, exploring new path with courage. We should not be mixed-up with the past. Presently, we are seeing a committed passionate leadership for the missile programme. I consider that all the missiles should be developed, simultaneously in an integrated way." ..... The total orders to the production agency for Prithvi, Agni, Akash missiles and the BrahMos first of its kind supersonic cruise missile are valued over 93 lakh crore. Such is the power of single vision of our political and bureaucratic leadership.

— Dr. A P J Abdul Kalam
