= Zafar Saifullah =

Indian civil servant

Zafar Saifullah Sanglikar (c. 1936 – 25 July 2014) was appointed Cabinet Secretary of the Government of India from 1993 to 1994.

He belonged to the Karnataka cadre of Indian Administrative Service officers. Prior to his role as Cabinet Secretary, he held a variety of positions including that of Member Secretary of the Minorities Commission of India, Advisor to the Governor of Haryana, Secretary of Rural Development, Government of Karnataka, among others.

In 2008, Saifullah edited and published a book, Sulaimanis – Lives Less Ordinary. The book was released by the Vice-President of India Hamid Ansari.

Zafar Saifullah is first Muslim IAS officer who served as Cabinet Secretary of India.
