= Ajit Seth =

Indian civil servant (born 1951)

Ajit Seth IAS
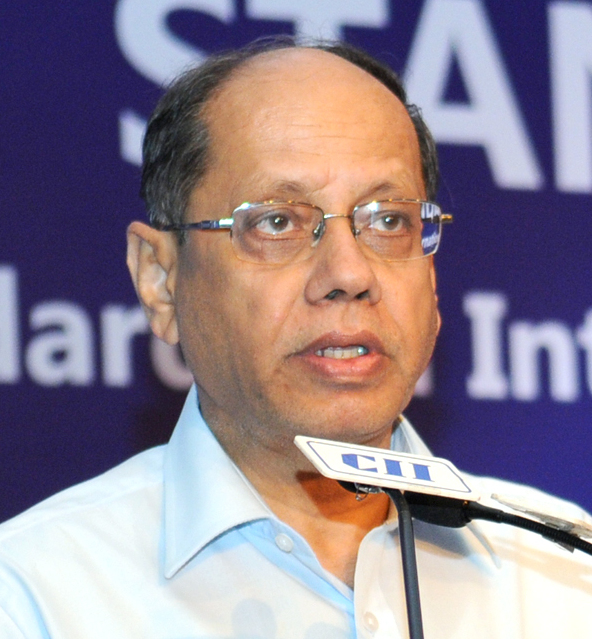

30th Cabinet Secretary of India
- In office 14 June 2011 – 13 June 2015
- Prime Minister: Manmohan Singh Narendra Modi
- Preceded by: K. M. Chandrasekhar
- Succeeded by: P. K. Sinha

Personal details
- Born: Ajit Kumar Seth; 24 November 1951 (age 74) Uttar Pradesh, India
- Education: St. Stephen's College, Delhi (BSc & MSc); Delhi University; JNU, Delhi (MPhil); University of Birmingham

Ajit Kumar Seth (born 24 November 1951) is an Indian civil servant who was the 30th Cabinet Secretary of the Republic of India. He is a 1974 batch Indian Administrative Service (IAS) officer from Uttar Pradesh Cadre. Upon retirement from the post of Cabinet Secretary, Ajit Kumar Seth was appointed as Chairman of Public Enterprises Selection Board (PESB).

== Early life and education ==
Seth was born in Uttar Pradesh. He earned Bachelor of Science and Master of Science in Chemistry from St. Stephen's College, Delhi and also MPhil in Life Sciences from the Jawaharlal Nehru University. He later earned a master's degree in Development Finance from the University of Birmingham.

== Career ==
Seth served as First Secretary in the Permanent Mission of India to the United Nations at Geneva. Earlier in the 1980s Shri Seth served in the Ministry of Commerce and he served for over 3 years as First Secretary in the Permanent Mission of India to the United Nations at Geneva, Switzerland.

While in the state in Uttar Pradesh, Shri Seth served as Principal Secretary (Rural Development), Principal Secretary (Vigilance) and Secretary (Home and Confidential) besides stints in Industries and Cooperatives Departments. He also served as Divisional Commissioner of Kumaon Division in Nainital and District Magistrate of Mainpuri and Lucknow districts.

Seth was given 6 months extension, as Cabinet Secretary, by the Appointments Committee of the Cabinet, headed by Prime Minister Narendra Modi on 5 December 2014.

Government offices
Preceded by K. M. Chandrasekhar	Cabinet Secretary of India; June 2011 - June 2015	Succeeded by Pradeep Kumar Sinha
