= Cabinet Secretary (India) =

Head of the Indian Civil Service

Cabinet Secretary of India
- मंत्रिमंडल सचिव
- Emblem of India

- Flag of India

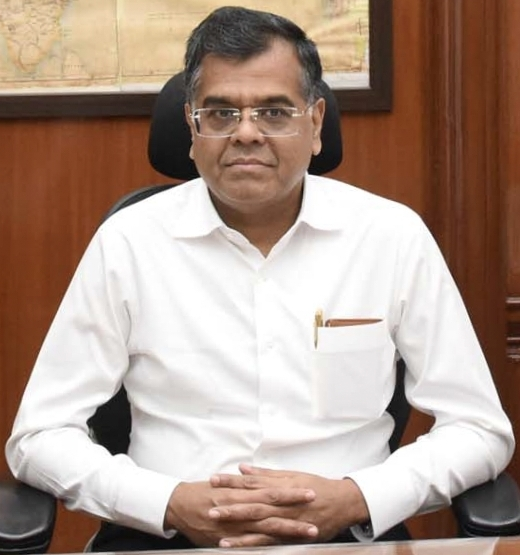
- Incumbent; T. V. Somanathan, IAS since 30 August 2024
- Cabinet Secretariat
- Status: Head of Permanent Executive
- Abbreviation: CSI
- Member of: Civil Services Board (Note: As Chairman.); NCMC; SPG; Space Commission; AEC
- Reports to: President of India; Prime Minister of India
- Residence: 12, Mother Teresa Crescent, New Delhi, 110011
- Seat: Cabinet Secretariat, New Delhi
- Appointer: ACC
- Term length: 4 years; Extension may be granted up to 1 year
- Inaugural holder: N. R. Pillai, ICS
- Formation: 6 February 1950; 76 years ago
- Succession: 11th (on the Indian order of precedence)
- Salary: ₹250,000 (US$2,600) monthly
- Website: cabsec.gov.in

The cabinet secretary (ISO:मंत्रिमंडळ सचिव) is the top-most executive official and senior-most civil servant of the Government of India. The cabinet secretary is the ex-officio head of the Civil Services Board, the Cabinet Secretariat, the Indian Administrative Service (IAS), and all Civil Services of India work under the rules of business of the government.

The cabinet secretary is the senior most cadre post of the Indian Administrative Service, ranking eleventh on the Indian order of precedence. The cabinet secretary is under the direct charge of the prime minister. Since 2010, the cabinet secretary's term length was extended to a maximum of four years. Thereafter, amended in 2019 for further extension up to 1 year. In, total up to 5 years.

== History ==
=== Origin ===
The precursor to the cabinet, the Executive Council of the viceroy, used to have a secretariat, which was headed by the private secretary of the viceroy. At first, the role of this secretariat was merely to take care of the paperwork related to the Executive Council but when the work of the individual departments under the council increased, the work of the secretariat too became more complex. The private secretary came to be known as the secretary of the secretariat. And this post became more powerful over time as the secretariat's main role became coordinating the work of the departments. In 1946, the secretariat became cabinet secretariat and the secretary became the cabinet secretary.

== Functions and power ==
The following are the functions of the cabinet secretary:

- Heads the Cabinet Secretariat.
- Acts as the chief coordinator of the central government.
- Acts as the chairman of the Civil Services Board, which among other things, recommends empanelment of officers (except officers under the Ministry of External Affairs), for the ranks of secretary, additional secretary and joint secretary.
- Act as the chairman of the Committee of Secretaries on Administration.
- Act as the chairman of the Conference of Chief Secretaries of States.
- Recommends postings of officers (except officers under the Ministry of External Affairs) of the rank of secretary and additional Secretary to the Appointments Committee of the Cabinet (ACC).
- Acts as the chairman of Senior Selection Board, which recommends postings of officers of the rank of joint secretary in the Union Government to the Appointments Committee of the Cabinet (ACC).
- Acts as a senior advisor to the prime minister.
- Provide assistance to the Council of Ministers.
- Prepares the agenda of the cabinet and minutes its meetings.
- Provide an element of continuity and stability to administration during crises.

== Role ==
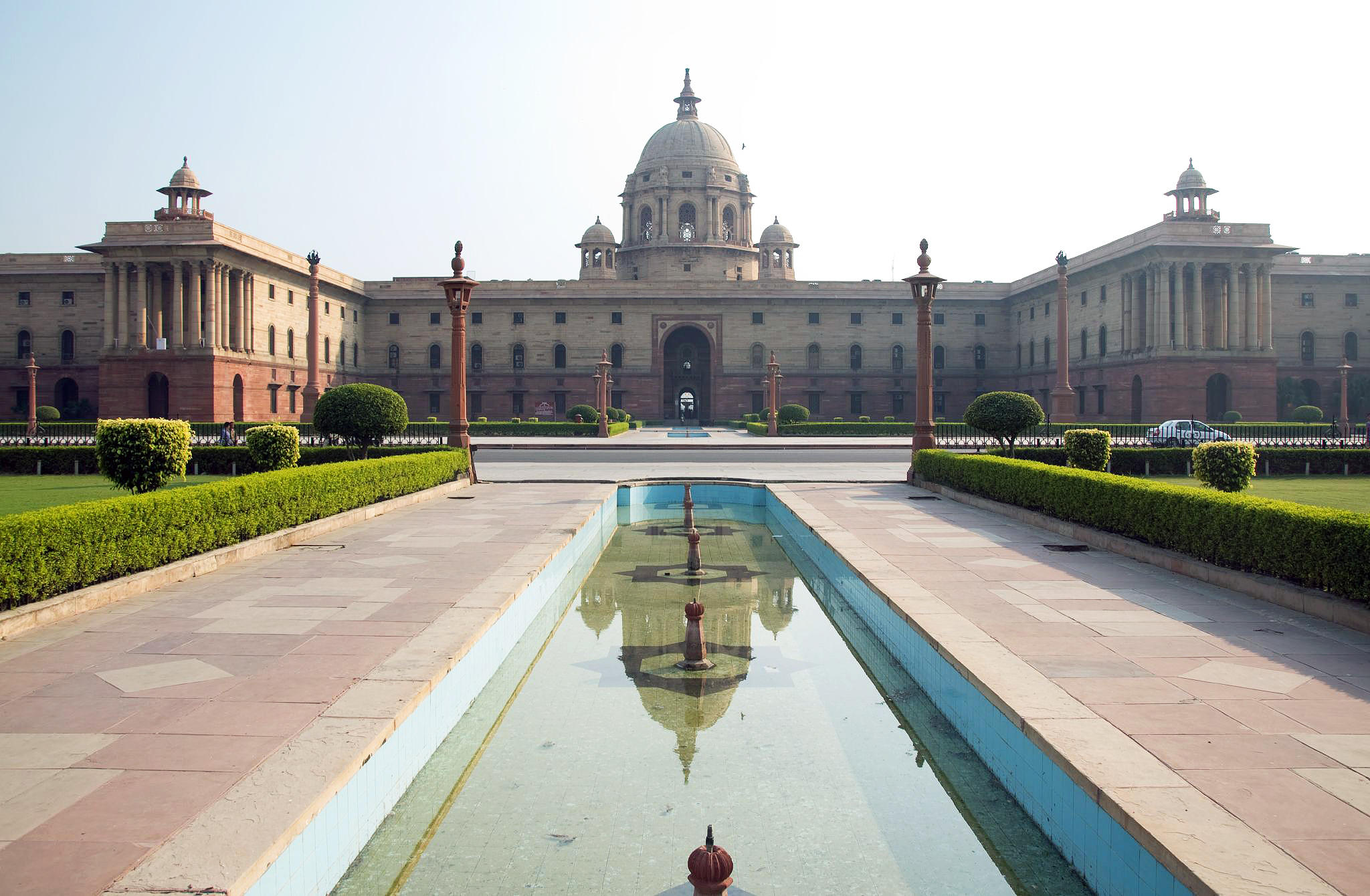
The Cabinet Secretariat is the office of Cabinet Secretary of India

In the Government of India Allocation of Business Rules, 1961, the Cabinet Secretariat finds a place in the First Schedule to the Rules. The subjects allotted to this Secretariat are, firstly, secretarial assistance to Cabinet and Cabinet Committees, and secondly, the Administration of the Rules of Business.

The Cabinet Secretariat is responsible for the administration of the Transaction of Business Rules, 1961 and the Allocation of Business Rules, 1961 of the Government of India, facilitating smooth transaction of business in ministries/departments of the Government by ensuring adherence to these rules. The Secretariat assists in decision-making in Government by ensuring Inter-Ministerial coordination, ironing out differences amongst ministries/departments and evolving consensus through the instrumentality of the standing/ad hoc Committees of Secretaries. Through this mechanism, new policy initiatives are also promoted.

The Cabinet Secretariat ensures that the President of India, the Vice-President and Ministers are kept informed of the major activities of all departments by means of a monthly summary of their activities. Management of major crisis situations in the country and coordinating activities of the various ministries in such a situation is also one of the functions of the Cabinet Secretariat.

The Cabinet Secretariat comprises three wings: Civil, Military and Intelligence. The Civil wing is considered to be the main wing and provides aid, advice and assistance to the Union Cabinet. The purpose of having the Military wing is to have better coordination in Intelligence and to provide secretarial assistance to the Defence Committee of the Cabinet and the National Defence Council. The Military wing is represented by an officer of the rank of major general, or its equivalents in the Indian Armed Forces, who is designated as a joint secretary in the Cabinet Secretariat. The Intelligence wing deals with matters pertaining to the Joint Intelligence Committee of the union cabinet. The chief of the Research and Analysis Wing (R&AW) also officially first reports to the cabinet secretary, and is designated Secretary (R) in the Cabinet Secretariat.

The First Administrative Reforms Commission (1966–70) found that the average tenure of the cabinet secretary was two years and eight months, which was considered to be inadequate. It recommended a tenure of three to four years. It also wanted that cabinet secretary to act as the principal staff officer to the prime minister, the cabinet and the cabinet committees for important matters.

=== Head of the All India Civil Services ===
As head of the Civil Services, the incumbent position holder is accountable for ensuring that the civil services are equipped with the skills and capability to meet the everyday challenges it faces and that civil servants work in a fair and decent environment. The cabinet secretary is arguably India's most powerful bureaucrat and the right hand of the Prime Minister of India.

== Emolument, accommodation and perquisites ==
The cabinet secretary to Government of India is eligible for a diplomatic passport. The official earmarked residence of the cabinet secretary is 12, Mother Teresa Crescent, New Delhi, a Type-VIII bungalow.

The salary and emolument in this rank is in pay level 18 which is equivalent to Chief of the Army Staff, but in precedence the cabinet secretary is listed above all other government officers including those from armed forces. It is however a fact, that the warrant of precedence is not an indication of functional or inter-se seniority, and is only referred to for seating at official functions, with no relevance to the day-to-day business of government.

Cabinet secretary monthly pay
Base salary as per 7th Pay Commission (Per month)	Pay matrix level	Sources
₹250,000 (US$2,600)	Pay level 18	

== List of cabinet secretaries of India ==
In 1950, N. R. Pillai, ICS was appointed as the first cabinet secretary.

Cabinet secretaries of India since 1950
S.No	Name	Portrait	Assumed office	Left office	Tenure	Cadre/ Batch	Notes
1	N. R. Pillai		6 February 1950	13 May 1953	2 years, 7 months, 8 days	ICS	Inaugural Holder. Later second Secretary General, Ministry of External Affairs and Ambassador of India to France.
2	Y. N. Sukthankar		14 May 1953	31 July 1957	4 years, 2 months, 17 days	ICS	Later 6th Governor of Orissa.
3	M. K. Vellodi		1 August 1957	4 June 1958	10 months, 3 days	ICS	Earlier served as High Commissioner of India to the United Kingdom, and as the 1st Chief Minister of Hyderabad State. Later Indian Ambassador to Switzerland.
4	Vishnu Sahay		1 July 1958	10 November 1960	2 years, 4 months, 9 days	ICS	
5	B. N. Mahto		10 November 1960	8 March 1961	3 months, 26 days	ICS	Shortest serving Cabinet Secretary
6	Vishnu Sahay		9 March 1961	15 April 1962	1 year, 1 month, 6 days	ICS	Later Governor of Assam and Governor of Nagaland.
7	S. S. Napit		15 April 1962	18 November 1964	2 years, 7 months, 3 days	ICS	
8	Dharma Vira		18 November 1964	27 June 1966	1 year, 7 months, 9 days	ICS	Later Governor of Punjab, 1st Governor of Haryana, Governor of West Bengal, and Governor of Mysore.
9	D. S. Joshi		27 June 1966	31 December 1968	2 years, 6 months, 4 days	ICS	
10	B. Sivaraman		1 January 1969	30 November 1970	1 year, 10 months, 29 days	ICS	
11	T. Swaminathan		1 December 1970	2 November 1972	1 year, 11 months, 1 day	ICS	Later Chief Election Commissioner of India.
12	B. D. Pande		2 November 1972	31 March 1977	4 years, 4 months, 29 days	ICS	Later Governor of West Bengal, Governor of Punjab, and Administrator of Chandigarh.
13	N. K. Mukarji		31 March 1977	31 March 1980	3 years	ICS	Later Governor of Punjab.
14	S. S. Grewal		2 April 1980	30 April 1981	1 year, 28 days	PB:1947	Later Governor of Madhya Pradesh.
15	C. R. Krishnaswamy Rao		30 April 1981	8 February 1985	3 years, 9 months, 9 days	AP:1949	
16	P. K. Kaul		8 February 1985	22 August 1986	1 year, 6 months, 14 days	UP:1951	Later Ambassador of India to the United States.
17	B. G. Deshmukh		23 August 1986	27 March 1989	2 years, 7 months, 4 days	MH:1951	
18	T. N. Seshan		27 March 1989	23 December 1989	8 months, 26 days	TN:1955	Later Chief Election Commissioner of India.
19	V. C. Pande		23 December 1989	11 December 1990	11 months, 18 days	RJ:1955	Later Governor of Bihar and Governor of Arunachal Pradesh.
20	Naresh Chandra		11 December 1990	31 July 1992	1 year, 7 months, 20 days	RJ:1956	Later Governor of Gujarat and Ambassador of India to the United States.
21	S. Rajgond		1 August 1992	31 July 1993	11 months, 30 days	MH:1957	
22	Zafar Saifullah		31 July 1993	31 July 1994	1 year	KA:1958	
23	Surendra Singh		1 August 1994	31 July 1996	1 year, 11 months, 30 days	UP:1959	
24	T. S. R. Subramanian		1 August 1996	31 March 1998	1 year, 7 months, 30 days	UP:1961	
25	Prabhat Kumar		1 April 1998	31 October 2000	2 years, 6 months, 30 days	UP:1963	Later First Governor of Jharkhand.
26	T. R. Prasad		1 November 2000	31 October 2002	1 year, 11 months, 30 days	AP:1963	Earlier served as Defence Secretary.
27	Kamal Pandey		1 November 2002	14 June 2004	1 year, 7 months, 13 days	UK:1965	
28	B. K. Chaturvedi		14 June 2004	14 June 2007	3 years	UP:1966	
29	K. M. Chandrasekhar		14 June 2007	14 June 2011	4 years	KL:1970	
30	Ajit Seth		14 June 2011	14 June 2015	4 years	UP:1974	
31	P. K. Sinha		14 June 2015	30 August 2019	4 years 2 months 16 days	UP:1977	
32	Rajiv Gauba		30 August 2019	30 August 2024	5 years	JH:1982	Longest-serving Cabinet Secretary. Earlier served as Home Secretary.
33	T. V. Somanathan		30 August 2024	Incumbent	2 years, 62 days	TN:1987	Earlier served as Finance Secretary.

== See also ==
- Secretary of the Research and Analysis Wing
- Defence Secretary (India)
- Foreign Secretary (India)
- Home Secretary (India)
- Chief secretary (India)
- Principal Secretary to the Prime Minister of India
- National Security Advisor (India)
