= D. S. Joshi =

Indian civil servant

Dattatraya Shridhar Joshi (born 11 October 1908, date of death unknown) was an Indian Civil Service of 1933 batch. He served as the 9th Cabinet Secretary of India from 27 June 1966 to 31 December 1968. Joshi belongs to Deshastha Rigvedi Brahmin community.

He was awarded Padma Vibhushan, second highest civilian honour of India by the President of India, in 1969.
