= One Rank, One Pension =

Demand of the Indian armed forces

One Rank One Pension (OROP), or "same pension, for same rank, for same length of service, irrespective of the date of retirement", is a longstanding demand of the Indian armed forces and veterans. The demand for pay-pension equity, which underlies the OROP concept, was provoked by the exparte decision by the Indira Gandhi-led Indian National Congress (INC) government, in 1973, two years after the historic victory in the 1971 Bangladesh war.

In 1986, the sense of unease and distrust prompted by the Third Central Pay Commission (CPC) was exacerbated by the Rajiv Gandhi-led Indian National Congress (I) Government's decision to implement Rank Pay, which reduced basic pay of captain, majors, lt-colonel, colonels, and brigadiers, and their equivalent in the air-force, and the navy, relative to basic pay scales of civilian and police officers. The decision to reduce the basic pay of these ranks, implemented without consulting the armed forces, created radically asymmetries between police-military ranks, affected the pay and pension of tens of thousands of officers and veterans, and spawned two decades of contentious litigation by veterans. It became a lingering cause of distrust between the armed forces veterans and the Ministry of Defense (MOD).

In 2008, the Manmohan Singh led United Progressive Alliance (UPA) Government in the wake of the Sixth Central Pay Commission (6CPC), discarded the concept of rank-pay. Instead it introduced Grade pay, and Pay bands, which instead of addressing the rank, pay, and pension asymmetries caused by 'rank pay' dispensation, reinforced existing asymmetries. The debasing of armed forces ranks was accompanied by decision in 2008 to create hundreds of new posts of secretaries, special Secretaries, director general of police (DGP) at the apex grade pay level to ensure that all civilian and police officers, including defence civilian officers, retire at the highest pay grade with the apex pay grade pensions with One Rank One Pay (OROP).

== Background ==
Between 2008–14, during the tenure of the United Progressive Alliance (UPA) Government led by Prime Minister Manmohan Singh, Armed Forces grievances prompted by perceived inequities subsumed with the OROP issue to made OROP a rallying call that resonated with veterans of all ranks. In the latter half of 2008, against the background of perceived discrimination and slights, armed forces veterans started a campaign of nationwide public protests and hunger strikes. In response to the OROP protests, which underscored the growing pay-pension-status asymmetries, the UPA Government appointed a parliamentary committee in 2011 which found merit in the veterans demands for OROP.

== Issues ==
The primary motivating grievance for the dispute was a string of decisions by the UPA Government in 2008–9 in the wake of the 6CPC, that sharply degraded Armed Forces pay grades and ranks. The failure to address issue of pay-pension equity, and the underlying issue of honor, led to escalation of the dispute.

=== Reduction of armed forces pensions ===
In 1973, the Indira Gandhi led Congress (I) terminated ‘One Rank One Pension’, the basis for deciding pension of Indian Armed Forces Personnel ‘which had been in vogue for 26 years since independence’ through an ex parte administrative order. In addition, the Government, on the basis of the report of third Pay commission, increased the pension of civilians, who retired at 58, from 30 to 50 percent, and reduced the pension of soldiers, Non Commissioned Officers (NCOs) and Junior commissioned Officers (JCOs) from 70 to 50 percent of basic pay, with the caveat that for full pension the minimum service was 33 years. But as soldiers in 1973 retired after 15 years service, at the age of 33–36, they got less than 30 percent of the pay as pension. In addition to downgrading military pensions, the government downgraded the status of soldiers by equating an "infantry soldier with less than three years' service" with "semi-skilled/unskilled labour". The decision was announced two months after Field Marshal Sam Manekshaw, who led the army in the victorious 1971 India-Pakistan war, retired from service. The reason for depressing the armed Forces pensions given by the Congress I government was that it wanted to ensure ‘equivalence’ of Armed Forces pensions with civilians.

=== Rank Pay ===
The concept of rank-pay introduced in 1986, affected tens of thousand of serving and retired officers of the three armed forces. Its provisions reinforced the growing sense of distrust between the MOD and the veterans. It debased the military ranks of captain, majors, lt-colonel, colonels, and brigadiers, and their equivalent in the air-force and the Indian Navy.

The implementation of Bharatiya Janata Party Government in 2016 of a separate pay matrix for the police and the armed forces, accentuated the anomalies in time scale pay grades between armed forces officers and the IPS, which had remain unresolved since 1986, when the congress government had reduced the basic pay of armed forces officers relative to police officers by deducting 'rank-pay' from the basic-pay. The 7CPC decision on pay grades for the armed forces were called blatantly 'discriminatory' by former Chief of Indian Army General Ved Prakash Malik, who said the intent was to degrade armed forces ranks in comparison with police time scale ranks.

=== Non Functional Upgradation (NFU) for police officers and others ===
Sanction of OROP at apex scale to all civil services and police officers was accompanied by grant of "Non Functional Upgrade" (NFU) also called "non-functional financial up-gradation" (NFFU) to all civil services including the Indian Police Service by the Congress (I) the UPA Government, in 2008, to reward civil servants of 49 'Organized Central Group A Services', with automatic time bound pay promotions till the Higher Administrative Grade(HAG), a grade equated by Government with Lt Generals, Vice Admirals, and Air Marshals of Armed Forces.

The exclusion of Armed Forces officers corps from the NFU, despite representation by the Chief of Staff, adversely impacted the pay and pension structures of colonels, brigadier and generals, and their equivalents in the navy and the air-force; like OROP it become an emotive 'honor' issue; and, according to former senior military commanders, has had a corrosive impact on the Armed Forces morale, status, cohesion, and national security,

=== Up Graduation of heads of Central and State Police Forces ===
In addition to NFU, Apex OROP for police and civil servants, the UPA Government, in 2008, in recognition of the growing influence of Indian Police service in Ministry of Home Affairs (MHA), India's Interior Ministry, promoted the heads of the Central Reserve Police Force (CRPF), Border Security Force (BSF), and even of the smaller MHA Forces, like the Indo-Tibetan Border Police (ITBP), Central Industrial Security Force (CISF) (CISF) and Sashastra Seema Bal (SSB), The Railway Police, an IG level post, to the highest grade pay, or the apex scale, with pay scale of Rs.80,000 (fixed). In addition, the Government upgraded heads of Police in all states, small or large, to Director General level to the highest grade pay, or the apex scale of Rs 80,000(fixed). This increased the number of IPS officers with several dozen, and made the Director Generals (DG) of these Central and state Forces at par in rank, pay, and status with Armed Forces senior most Lieutenant Generals, Air Marshals and Vice Admirals. The only MHA Armed Forces left out from up gradation to the higher grades was the Assam rifles, which is headed by an army Lt General, and the National Security Guard (NSG), which has a sizable army component.

The immediate effect of these changes was that many IPS officers were immediately made senior in pay grade. 'Non-functional financial up-gradation'(NFU) was not extended to Armed Forces.

=== Asymmetries in time scale pay, pension, and allowances ===
The United Progressive Alliance (UPA) Government headed by Manmohan Singh, following the recommendations of the sixth pay commission, mandated with effect from 01.09.2008 six time scale pay grade promotions on completion of 4, 9, 13, 14, 16/18 years of service for all officers in civil services including defense civilian officers in the MOD responsible for providing secretarial, and logistic support to the armed forces, and police officers including custom, revenue, railway, and industrial police. In comparison with six time-scale pay upgrades-promotions for the police, and defence civilian officers, the government approved three time scale pay upgrade-promotions for armed forces officers on completion of 2, 6, and 13 years of service, and at a far lower scale.

Civil -Police- Military Officers Timescale promotions-pay grades (2008–16)

Asymmetries in time scale pay-grades for civil-police-and the armed forces officers as result of government decision in 2008 are tabulated below:

Number of years of service	Time scale(TS) Civil services promotion-pay grade	Time scale(TS) Police promotion-pay grade (including revenue, custom, railway, and industrial police)	Time scale(TS) Armed Forces promotion-pay grades (Army, Navy, and Air force)	Difference in grade pay	Comments
0	5400	5400	5400	-	
2	-	-	-	-	
4	6600	6600	6100	500	
6	-	-	6600	-	-
9	7600	7600	6600	1000	
13	8700	8700	8000	700	The UPA Government, without assigning any reason, fixed the grade-pay of Armed Forces officers with 13 years service at Rs 7600, the same as police officers and defence civilian officers with 9 years service, even though armed forces officers had in the past enjoyed a two-year edge at this service level. Following forceful intervention by Adm Sureesh Mehta, Chief of the Naval Staff, the government agreed to increase the grade pay of officers with 13 years service to Rs 8000, Rs 700 less than that for similarly placed officers from Audit and Account, Police, and customs services. The armed forces however remained disappointed with the grudging concession because it came with demeaning caveats.
14	8900	8900	8000	900	
16	10000	-	8000	2000	
18	-	10000	8000	2000	
21	10000	10000	8700	1300	

=== Ministry of Defence (MOD) ===
The higher bureaucracy in Indian Ministry of Defence (MOD) is drawn from the IAS and from other civil services, including from civilian services responsible for providing support services to the Armed Forces such as from the Indian Defence Estates Service(IDES), the Indian Defence Accounts Service (IDAS), and Indian Ordnance Factories Service. The entire MOD bureaucracy is covered by Apex OROP. MOD higher bureaucracy, despite being granted apex-OROP coverage and NFU has been opposed to OROP and NFU for the Armed Forces.

In 2011, during the tenure AK Antony, as Defence Minister, Neelam Nath, Secretary of Department of Ex-servicemen Welfare (Poorva Senani Kalyan Vibhag) from 1 June 2009 to 30 September 2011, on instructions of Shashi Kant Sharma, Defence Secretary, opposed OROP for the Armed Force, in her deposition to the Parliamentary Panel. The Koshyari Committee however, disagreed with submissions by the Ministry of Defence and found "merit in the demand for One Rank One Pension by Armed Forces Personnel", and urged the Government to implement OROP at the earliest.

Four former heads of the Armed Forces in August 2015, in an open letter addressed to the President of India flagged "The hostile approach of MoD bureaucracy" and its "antagonistic handling of problems related to pensions and allowances of aging veterans, war widows and battle-casualties".

== Koshyari Committee, 2011 ==
In 2011 the Government set up a ten-member all-party Parliamentary Panel, known as the Koshyari Committee after its chairman, Bhagat Singh Koshyari, a veteran Bharatiya Janata Party (BJP) Member of Parliament (MP), to examine the OROP issue. The Koshyari Committee after considering the evidence, and hearing oral depositions for eight months, submitted its report in December of that year. The committee unanimously found merit in OROP and strongly recommended its implementation. The Koshyari Committee (Petitions Committee of the Rajya Sabha), after examining the evidence, and taking into account the written and oral submissions by top officials from the Ministry of Defence (MOD) and Finance, veterans, and senior serving armed forces officers, over a six-month period (May–December 2011), defined the concept of OROP as follows:

OROP "implies that uniform pension be paid to the Armed Forces Personnel retiring in the same rank with the same length of service irrespective of their date of retirement and any future enhancement in the rates of pension to be automatically passed on to the past pensioners."

The Koshyari Committee definition of OROP was accepted by the Government, endorsed by Parliament, and by ex-servicemen and ex-servicemen organizations. It has since become basis for the ex-servicemen's demand for implementation of OROP. It is in sync with the ex-servicemen definition of OROP, according to which OROP "implies the grant of equal pension to soldiers of a particular rank, who have rendered the same length of service, irrespective of the date of their retirement".

On 27 February 2014, the MOD, in a meeting to discuss implementation of OROP attended by AK Antony, Defence Minister, Jitendra Singh, Minister of State, RK Mathur, Defence Secretary, Sangita Gairola, Secretary Department of Ex-Servicemen's Welfare, Arunava Dutt, Secretary Defence Finance, Vice Chiefs of the three Service, and Adjutant General of the Army, endorsed the Koshyari Committee's definition of OROP.

== BJP Government's Response (2014-2016) ==
In May 2014, the UPA Government was replaced by the National Democratic Alliance (NDA) Government led by the Bharatiya Janata Party (BJP), which like the Congress Party, had included implementation of OROP in its election manifesto.

=== Narendra Modi ===
The BJP Prime Ministerial candidate, at a large election rally, in Rewari, Haryana, with General VK Singh, former Chief of Army Staff standing by his side, in the presence of tens of thousands Ex-Servicemen, declared that he will implement OROP, if elected. After Narendra Modi became Prime Minister there were more promises and public affirmations by him, and Manohar Parrikar, the Defence Minister, on the merits of OROP, and their intent to implement OROP. Most memorably on Diwali, at Siachen Glacier, in 2014, he told soldiers "It was in my destiny that One rank One pension has been fulfilled". On 30 May 2015, Prime Minister Narendra Modi, after more than a year of pledges and promises to implement OROP, controversially declared that the term OROP still needed to be defined. On 31 May 2015, Modi in Mann Ki Baat asked Ex-Servicemen to remain patient, as he gets rid of the bureaucratic hassles. Modi's statement was widely perceived as a disingenuous attempt to delay, dilute, and deny OROP.

=== Arun Jaitley ===
Arun Jaitley, the former Finance Minister and former Defence Minister, opposed the Koshyari Committee definition of OROP. On 31 August 2015 Arun Jaitley, without defining OROP, says, "I have my own formula on what OROP means. Somebody else may have their own formula on OROP but it has to be within reasonable and rational criteria. You can't have an OROP where pensions are revised every month or every year".

FAST-UNTO-DEATH
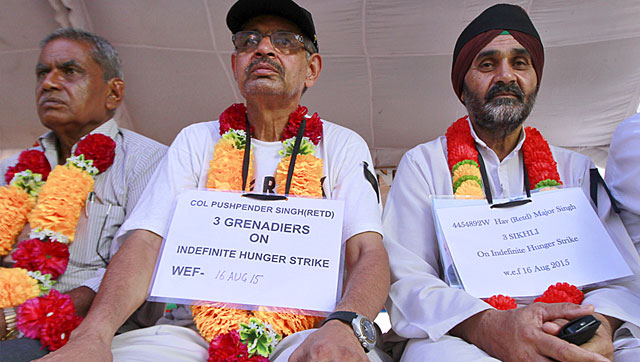
- Col Pushpender Singh and Hav Major Singh on fast-unto-death at Jantar Mantar OROP protest site.

== Protests by Veterans ==
On 15 June ex-servicemen commenced nationwide protests, and hunger strikes.

=== Support ===
Four former chiefs of the Armed Forces of India, namely General S F Rodrigues, former COAS, and Admirals L Ramdas, Arun Prakash and Sureesh Mehta, former Chiefs of Naval Staff, in an open letter to President Pranab Mukherjee, Supreme Commander of the Armed Forces, on 13 August 2015, warned that the denigration and humiliation of veterans, and the Government handling of veterans and armed Forces issues, posed grave "implication for national security"

=== Police Assault in Delhi, 2015 ===
On the morning of 14 August 2015, the eve India's 68 Independence day, and the day after General Ved P Mulik, former Army Chief, the government designated interlocutor informed Nripendra Misra in the Prime Minister Office (PMO) that the government offer on OROP for Ex-Servicemen was unacceptable, a contingent of police, drawn from the Delhi Police force, and the Central Reserve Police Force (CRPF), a paramilitary force for internal security and counterinsurgency, under Ministry of Home Affairs, on orders from Rajnath Singh, the Home Minister of India, and under the command of BS Bassi, Director General of Delhi Police, assaulted a peaceful gathering of Armed Forces veterans, families, and war widows, at Jantar Mantar, New Delhi.

Senior Delhi Police officers claiming that they acted "following a request by civic agency New Delhi Municipal Council". Senior officer of Delhi police also said that the veterans were viewed as security risk and security threat.

The orders to the Delhi Police to evict the veterans, which had their origins in the MHA and the PMO, were revoked on 14 August afternoon by Kiren Rijiju, Minister of State for Home, who said, "I have asked the Commissioner of Police not to remove the ex-servicemen from Jantar Mantar and let them continue the protest".

==== Former Chiefs of the Armed Forces protest attack on veterans ====
On 17 August, 10 former Chiefs of the Armed Forces of India addressed a joint open letter to Narendra Modi condemning the police action, and urged the PM to order an inquiry into the action by the Delhi Police. The Signatories to the letter included retired Generals Vishwa Nath Sharma, Shankar Roy Choudhary, Sundararajan Padmanabhan, Joginder Jaswant Singh, Deepak Kapoor and Bikram Singh; retired Air Chief Marshals Nirmal Chandra Suri and Shashindra Pal Tyagi, and retired Admiral Madhvendera Singh.

Rajnath Singh, Home Minister, instead of ordering inquiry into the police excesses as demanded by the former Chiefs of Staff, asked Bhim Sain Bassi, DG Delhi Police, to send an officer to meet veterans and apologize for the police action on 14 August. MK Meena, Delhi Police officer met the veterans and made a public apology.

==== Ex-Serviceman commits suicide over OROP ====
An Ex-Serviceman Ram Kishan Grewal committed suicide over delay in One Rank One Pension issue on 1 November 2016. Grewal reportedly left a suicide note stating that he was taking this extreme step for soldiers.

==== Veterans response to police attack ====
Ex-servicemen outraged by police assertion that they were considered a security threat to the Independence day celebrations retorted "We served the country in protecting it and now we have become security threat." Two days after the police assault, Colonel (Retd) Pushpender Singh (Ex-3 Grenadiers) and Havaldar (Retd) Major Singh (Ex-3 Sikh Light Infantry), same Regiment as Retired General Ved Malik, began hunger strike-unto-death at Jantar Mantar, to protest police brutality, and delay in government implementation of OROP. A day later on 18 August 2015 Havildar Ashok Chauhan, Corps of signals, joined in the hunger strike.

One Rank One Pension (OROP)
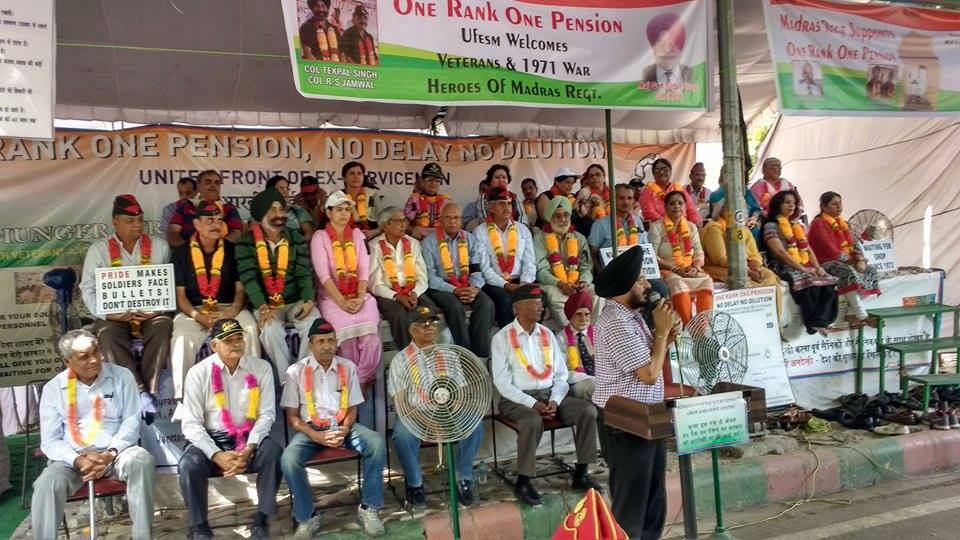
- Indian ex-servicemen(veterans) on Protest at Jantar Mantar, New Delhi for Equalization of Pension of all veterans retired in same rank with same years of service.

== OROP Scheme ==
In September 2015 the Government announced that it would implement the One rank One Pension pension scheme. Five months later in February 2016, it issued orders to implement the scheme. The scheme announced by the Government failed to satisfy the leaders of the protest movement, who vowed to take the government to court.

== Potential beneficiaries of OROP ==
Potential beneficiaries of OROP include about 2.6 million ex-servicemen, and 60,000 widows, a combined total of 3.2 million, of whom about 86 percent are widows, JCOs, NCOs, and other ranks, and about 14 percent are officers. Out of the estimated outlay on OROP of Rs ₹8,400 crore (equivalent to ₹140 billion or US$1.4 billion in 2026); about ₹6,200 crore (equivalent to ₹100 billion or US$1.1 billion in 2026) will be on account of Widows, JCOs, NCOs, and other ranks, and about ₹2,200 crore (equivalent to ₹36 billion or US$380 million in 2026) for Officers.

Subhash Bhamre, Minister of State for Defence, in November 2016, informed the Rajya Sabha that there are 20,63,529 pensioner beneficiaries of OROP, of whom 1429 have submitted complaints regarding OROP benefits.

== Defence pensions ==
As a result of the protracted OROP protest, expenditure on pensions for the armed forces gained salience. India defence pensions, i.e., pensions paid from defence services estimate, also includes pension bill for about 400,000 defence civilians, and Ministry of Finance personnel attached to MOD. In the 2015–16 Defence pension bill was ₹54,500 crore (equivalent to ₹900 billion or US$9.3 billion in 2026) of which about 36 percent was on account of defence civilians. According to Brig Deepak Sinha, a respected commentator on military affairs, "civilian pensions, despite catering to one-fifth the number of military pensioners, utilizes approximately 36 percent of defence pensions, and given our difficulties in ensuring employment, even populism suggests it is better to reduce civilians who cost five times more than to reduce the military".

== Chronology ==
=== 2014 ===
17 February 2014

In the interim budget speech on 17 Feb 14 the Finance Minister announced that Government accepted the 'principle' of OROP for Defense Forces. The demand note was however never raised by the Ministry Of Defence.

26 February 14

Government issue Order to Implementation OROP.

27 February 2014

A K Antony, Defence Minister says that UPA will implement OROP by 1 April 2014.

24 April 2014

A K Antony constituted a Joint Working Group (JWG), with CGDA, as chairperson (later promoted to Secretary & Financial Adviser in the MoD). Members included representatives from Department of Ex-Servicemen Welfare, Defence/Finance, and Service HQ (Chairmen of the Army, Navy and Air Force Pay Commission Cells and a few officers). The first meeting of the JWG was convened on 2 May 2014 in the office of the CGDA.

9 June 2014

The President in a Statement to the joint session of parliament said Government had drafted National Commission for Ex-Servicemen Bill, 2015 in order to set up the National Commission for Ex-Servicemen. However, no funds were allocated for setting up of the commission during the year 2014–15.

10 July 2014

Arun Jaitley, Finance Minister and Defence Minister, in his maiden Budget Speech in the parliament, said "We reaffirm our commitment to our brave soldiers. A policy of 'One Rank One Pension' has been adopted by the Government to address the pension disparities. We propose to set aside a further sum of ₹ 1,000 crore to meet this year's requirement"

14 August 2014

Maj Gen (Retd) Satbir Singh, SM, Chairman IESM, wrote to Narendra Modi, Prime Minister, in response to his statement in Leh on 12 Aug 2014 stating that budget caters for the demand of OROP. The letter says the statement is "erroneous", and not in sync with Draft Govt Letter (DGL) prepared by Service HQs in the meetings in Feb and March, 2014, in which the forecast for OROP was ₹ 5000 crore, and not ₹ 1500 crore earmarked in the budget. The letter recalls that in a meeting chaired by Mr. AK Antony, former Defence Minister on 26 Feb 2014, OROP definition was approved and OROP was to be implemented with effect from 1 Apr 2014. The letter reminds the PM that "It has been six months since the OROP was approved".

20 August 2014

Air Chief Marshal Arup Raha, Admiral Robin Dhowan and General Dalbir Singh Suhag, briefed A K Mathur, Justice (retd), the chairman 7th Central Pay Commission (CPC), on the pay and pension "anomalies" caused by the 6 CPC.

23 October 2014

Narendra Modi, on Diwali Day, during a well publicized visit to army formation in Siachen Glacier, told soldiers "It was in my destiny that One rank One pension has been fulfilled". Modi's "Mann Ki Baat", radio address on 31 May 2015, in which he asked Ex-Servicemen to remain patient, as he gets rid of the bureaucratic hassles.

24 December 2014

Manohar Parrikar, Defence Minister, on the advice of R.K. Mathur, Defence Secretary (25.05.2013 -24.05.2015), informed Chairman of the 7CPC, that he did not favor NFU for the Armed Forces. The justification for not recommending NFU for the armed forces is that the Cabinet Secretary, in 2011, had not made "any recommendations on the issue".

=== 2015 ===
17 February 2015

Manohar Parrikar, Defence Minister, approved proposal for implementation of OROP, estimated to cost ₹ 8600 crores. The proposal was forwarded by the MOD to Ministry of Finance on 17 Mar 2015, where it is still lying.

5 May 2015

Lt Gen SK Bahri, Chairman, Alliance of Ex-Servicemen Organizations, who had attended Modi's Rally at Riwari in 2013, wrote to Narendra Modi, Prime Minister, to say that "ESM community is a very disillusioned lot". He reminded the PM of his promise at Riwari, and the repeated promises to implement OROP by the Defence Minister, including the COAS, since then. The letter blamed the "intransigent bureaucracy" and Arun Jaitley the Finance Minister (FM) for the delay.

12 May 2015

Bidyadhar Nayak, Petty Officer Radio(Special), Indian Navy, general secretary of the Odisha unit, issued a press release on behalf of Indian Ex-Services League (IESL), Odisha unit. The press release blamed the bureaucracy for non-implementation of the grant of One Rank One Pension (OROP).

16 May 2015

Manohar Parrikar, in Goa, said "OROP proposal is in final stage. The defence ministry has approved it and the finance ministry will clear it in a few days, adding, "it is the first time that a clear proposal has been sent to finance ministry on OROP."

28 May 2015

Wing Commander Suresh Damodar Karnik, 80, winner of the Vir Chakra for combat action in the eastern and western theatres, in 1971 War, and former flight commander No 16 Bomber Squadron (Black Cobras), Indian Air Force (IAF), refused to meet with Manohar Parrikar, Defence Minister, and Devendra Fadnavis, Chief Minister, Maharashtra, to protest BJP's failure to honour its commitment to implement OROP. The wing commander, on 28 May 2015, in Pune, said that he and his colleagues are unable to 'accept the invite' from the present Government because of its policy of NATO or ‘NO ACTION TALK ONLY’.

4 June 2015

Lt General Vijay Oberoi, former Vice Chief of Army Staff, and widely respected war hero of the 1965 war in which he lost his right leg while serving with Maratha Light Infantry, dismissed Narendra Modi's comments on OROP as disingenuous, especially his comment that there were multiple definitions of OROP.

6 June 2015

Ex-Servicemen delegation led by Major General (Retired) Satbir Singh met Manohar Parrikar, Defence Minister. The meeting was arranged on the initiative of General Dalbir Singh Suhag, Chief of Army Staff. The meeting was inconclusive, and the two sides agreed to meet again.

11 June 2015

Brig (Retired) Harwant Singh, state convener of the Indian Ex-Servicemen Movement (IESM), announced that about 5,000 ex-servicemen from Punjab, which has about 6,00,000 Ex-servicemen, were planning to go to Delhi to participate in the protest rally on the grant of OROP scheduled to begin 14 June. Brig KS Kahlon (retd), President, chapter of the All India Defence Brotherhood, said the protest would also include return of war medals to the President by some ex-servicemen.

14–15 June 2015

Veteran held "Maha Sangram Rally" at Jantar Mantar, New Delhi, and 50 other locations nationwide. On 15 June, they commenced a relay hunger strike.–

15 Jun 2015

On 15 Jun 2015 several hundred of ex-servicemen, widows and Veer Narees of All Assam Ex-servicemen Welfare Association (South Zone) Patharkandi, Assam held a rally under Ex Sub Maj Nirmal Sinha, President of the Association with 12 hours hunger strike. The rally was started from AMAR JAWAN & WAR MEMORIAL point (Constructed by ExSub Maj Nirmal Sinha (Sigs)), marched through the town along the NH 8. A memorandum to His Excellency The President of India was sent through JR Lal Seim the Circular Officer of Patharkandi requesting immediate implementation of OROP.

On 15 June, several hundred ex-servicemen, staged a dharna, at Lower PMG Square, Bhubaneshwar, Odisa. Bidyadhar Nayak, general secretary, Indian Ex-Services League(IESL), Odisa unit, referring to the PM's statement that OROP was complex issue said, "Does this imply that OROP has got entangled in bureaucratic malaise for another four years? We have every reason to believe that the Prime Minister is being fed with falsities by sections who are against OROP and lobbies are working hard against the armed forces personnel." IESL officials Group Captain Jagadananda Brahma, President IESL, Arun Mohanty, and Bidyadhar Nayak submitted a memorandum on implementation of OROP to Governor SC Jamir

GIVE US RIGHT NOW WHAT IS LAWFULLY OURS
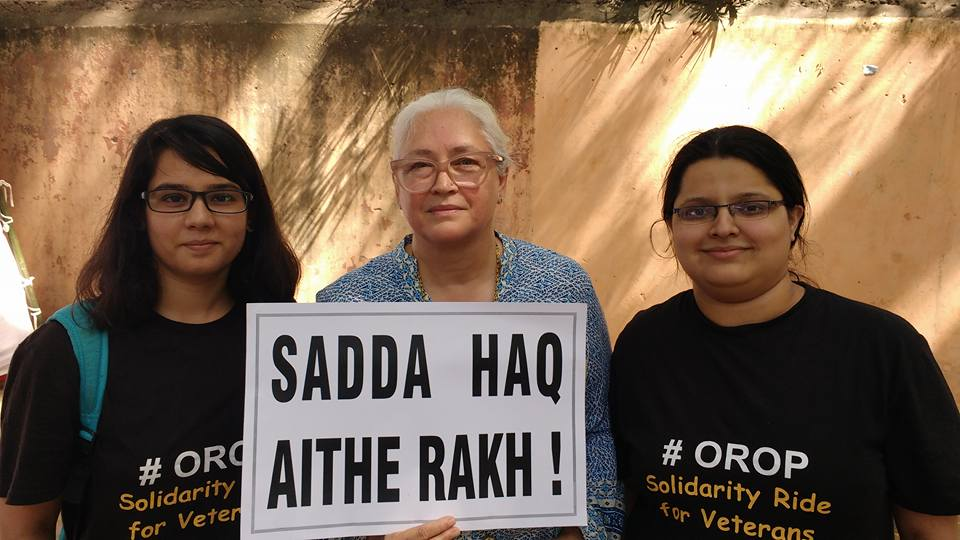
- Nafisa Ali (actress & veteran's wife) expressing solidarity with OROP protest along with OROP activists Richa and Janhvi.

22 June 2015

Ex-servicemen announced their intent to boycott golden jubilee events to mark the 1965 war with Pakistan, including "felicitation of 1965 War Veterans" to be hosted by President Pranab Mukherjee at the Rashtrapati Bhavan in September. Ex-Servicemen also announced their intent to boycott all government functions including at-home by president on Independence day (August 15), and the Ex-Servicemen contingent at the Republic Day Parade on 26 January 2016. Brigadier Harwant Singh, Regiment of Artillery, veteran of the battle of Chhamb-Akhnoor, 1965 war, said "We don't wish to be treated as showpieces, to be rolled out for ceremonies and discarded thereafter."

25 June 2015

Mizoram Ex-Service League, which has membership of 6,200 ex-servicemen [and about 25000 dependents], held a protest rally in Aizawl, demanding implementation of OROP.

27 June 2015

On the 13th Day of the Relay Hunger Strike Maj Gen Satbir Singh, SM (Retd), Chairman IESM, issued a circular claiming that hunger strike protest had spread to 50 locations, all over the country.

28 June 2015

500 veterans, demanding implementation of OROP, protested in Chennai, at Kamarajapuram Bus Stop, near Tambaram.

1 July 2015

United Front of Ex-servicemen, an ex-service organisation, revealed that ex-service men are reconsidering their protest tactics: new tactics would include continuation of relay hunger strike; protests outside homes of parliamentarians; mobilising electoral support against BJP in state election; and submitting letters and petitions to the President signed by war widows in their blood. In the meanwhile eight farmers organisations have joined the ex-servicemen protest under the banner 'Jai Jawan Jai Kisan'. A 1965 war veteran from Rajasthan, Krishan Kumar, in Delhi said, "We will stop fighting only when implementation of OROP takes place."

2 July 2015

On 19th day of nationwide hunger protest by ex-servicemen on 'One Rank One Pension' (OROP), Manohar Parrikar, Defence Minister and General Dalbir Singh Suhag, Army Chief of Staff, met a six-member delegation of United Front of Ex-Servicemen (UFESM).

7 July 2015

Brig Inder Mohan Singh (Retd), President, Indian Ex-Services League (IESL), Punjab, announced a plan to hold a protest rally by ex-servicemen on 8 July on a 3-km stretch on the Barnala-Bathinda Highway, from Sub-Area HQ gate to the headquarters X Corps gate. Protest placards read "Soldiers become veterans, veterans become beggars. This is Make in India"; "Once a soldier, now a humiliated veteran"; "In no other country veterans protest as in India"; and "Indian soldiers' enemies- some across borders some in Delhi". Bhatinda type protest on OROP, according to Brig (Retired) Inder Mohan Singh, will be also conducted in front of other military stations. There are 14 Army stations and 5 Air Force stations in Punjab.

Justice T S Thakur, Supreme Court Judge, in a hearing on a contempt petition by retired Major General S P S Vains, gave Additional Solicitor General Pinky Anand, six more weeks to implement OROP. The next hearing is on 24 August. The Supreme Court Judgment on 9 September 2008 in the case of Union of India and Maj Gen Vains and Others had ruled: (a) No Defence Personnel Senior in rank can get lesser pension than his junior irrespective of the date of retirement (b) Similarly placed Officers of the same rank are to be given the same pension irrespective of the date of retirement.

8 July 2015

Ex-Servicemen protesting against Government failure to implement OROP blocked traffic on Bathinda-Chandigarh highway from 10 am to 1 pm, and sat in dharna in front of the police post in Bhatinda cantonment. Brigadier Inder Mohan Singh (retired), IESL, submitted a petition to a representative of headquarter X Corps (Chetak Corps) South Western Command.

The police arrested six ex-servicemen and charged them under Indian Penal Code sections 283 (danger or obstruction in public way or line of navigation) and 188 (disobedience to order duly promulgated by public servant). The arrested include: Bhinder Singh, Ramji Das and Sukhdev Singh, from Sangrur; Baldev Singh from Tarn Taran; and Kartar Singh, and Baldev Raj Joshi, from Bathinda. The police also registered cases against over 150 others who have not been named.

10 July 2015

Bhagat Singh Koshyari, the sitting BJP MP from Nainital-Udhamsingh Nagar, claimed that the Koshyari committee Report on OROP, 2011, prepared by the panel headed by him, was fool-proof. He blamed the United Progressive Alliance government headed by Manmohan Singh, PM, for not implementing OROP.

11 July 2015

Five retired Lieutenant Generals, four Major Generals and one Air Marshall of the Indian Air Force, joined the protest at jantar mantar, in New Delhi. Many of these general officers belong to the famous June 1971 Indian Military Academy (IMA) course, the "Born to battle" course, that was sent into the 1971 war as Second Lieutenants (2/Lt). One of the 2/Lt from 'born to battle course' who went to war in 1971 was Arun Khetrapal, troop leader, Poona Horse, who was awarded posthoumously the Param Vir Chakra, the nations highest award for valour in the famous tank battle of Basantar. Another 2/Lt who joined the protest was Lieutenant General (Retired) Rajinder Singh Sujlana AVSM, VSM, former Colonel Commandant of the Sikh Regiment, and X Corps Commander.

17 July 2015

Defence Minister set up a five-member committee consisting Lt Gen Richard Khare, (Retd), former Military Secretary; Lt Gen Mukesh Sabharwal,(Retd), former Adjutant General; Major Navdeep Singh, Territorial Army, Chandigarh-based High Court lawyer, and commentator of service conditions; and Major DP Singh, Kargil war wounded. The committee is expected submit its findings and recommendations within 60 days. No official announcement on the committee has been made by MOD, or the Defence Minister's office, but media reports suggests that the term of reference of the committee include making recommendations on measures to reduce litigation by Armed Forces members and Ex-servicemen, including the MOD which is a frequent litigator. There are over 10,000 cases by military personnel before the Armed Forces Tribunal, the High Courts and the Supreme Court, most of them against the Ministry of Defence, or prompted by its decisions, on service matters relating to pay fixation, promotions, policy interpretation, pensions and military justice.

26 July 2015

To coincide with Vijay Diwas (Victory Day) events to mark the Kargil War, UK based Non Resident Indians (NRIs) held a one-day hunger strike to protest BJP Government failure to implement One rank One pension (OROP), outside the High Commission of India, London. A spokesperson for the protesters said similar protest are planned in other international cities, including in the US and Middle East.

31 July 2015

Admiral Ram Das Former Chief of Naval Staff visited Jantar Mantar to meet with and show solidarity with the Ex-servicemen and widows of veterans on hunger strike protesting the BJP Government failure to implement OROP and honour its election pledge. Admiral Ram Das made a donation to the ex-servicemen movement and said that he would write to all former Chiefs of the Army, Navy, and Airforce to overcome their inhibitions and visit Jantar mantar to show solidarity with the protesting ex-servicemen.

11 August

Gen V P Malik met Nripendra Misra in the Prime Minister Office (PMO) where he was briefed by Mishra, and a joint secretary (JS) dealing with OROP in PMO, on the governments stand. In the evening the JS in the PMO briefs Malik, Gen Satbir Singh of the Indian Ex-Servicemen Movement (IESM) and General Balbir Singh of the Indian Ex-Servicemen League (IESL).

12 August

General Malik meets Gen Satbir Singh of the Indian Ex-Servicemen Movement (IESM) and General Balbir Singh of the Indian Ex-Servicemen League (IESL), to discuss the 'government stand' which remains unchanged. The sticking point remains the new definition of OROP, and the date of implementation of OROP.

13 August 2015

Malik met Misra and briefed him on his discussions with the representatives of the Indian Ex Servicemen Movement (IESM). At this meeting, according to Gen Malik, Misra gave the ‘final stand of the Govt’ after speaking with Prime Minister and Arun Jaitley, the Finance Minister. The attempt at last minute mediation to enable the PM to make the OROP announcement on Independence day broke down on the issues of the government's new definition of OROP and date of implementation of OROP.

General S F Rodrigues, former COAS, and Admirals L Ramdas, Arun Prakash and Sureesh Mehta, former Chiefs of Naval Staff, wrote an open letter to President Pranab Mukherjee, Supreme Commander of the Armed Forces.

14 August 2015

Rajnath Singh, the Home Minister of India authorized Delhi Police, a police force under the Ministry of Home Affairs, to evict by force ex-servicemen, families of ex-servicemen, and war widows, from Jantar Mantar, the site of ex servicemen protests. The Police Contingent, consisting of personnel drawn from the Delhi Police, and Central Reserve Police Force, a counterinsurgency and internal security force under the Ministry of Home Affairs, in camouflage dress, unsupervised by senior officers, without advance warning, swooped down on the protesters. The protesting Ex servicemen, many in their eighties, were manhandled, 'pushed around', dragged, humiliated, and lathi-charged. Their tents were forcibly removed, placards and other equipment damaged.

The Delhi Police officers justified action against the peaceful gathering at Jantar Mantar claiming they acted "following a request by New Delhi Municipal Council", civic agency and because of security risk and threats. "As Delhi is on a high alert ahead of Independence Day so", a senior police officer said. " we are removing the protesters to ensure security."

The orders to Delhi police to remove the Ex servicemen, were rescinded on 14 August afternoon. The Home Minister's orders to stop the police action against the ex-servicemen were conveyed to Delhi Police Commissioner BS Bassi by Kiren Rijiju, Minister of State for Home.

15 August 2015

Prime Minister Narendra Modi referred to "One Rank One Pension" as a problem "pending to be resolved" in his Independence Day address from Red Fort, New Delhi.

17 August 2015

Ten former Chiefs of the Armed Forces of India (7 former chief of Indian Army staff, 2 Chiefs of Air Staff, and 1 Chief of Naval Staff), in a joint open letter urged Narendra Modi, the Prime Minister, to order an inquiry into the brutal police action by Delhi Police against the peaceful gathering of veterans in Jantar Mantar, on Independence Day eve and to resolve the OROP issue expeditious. The Signatories to the letter include retired Generals Vishwa Nath Sharma, Shankar Roy Choudhary, Sundararajan Padmanabhan, Joginder Jaswant Singh, Deepak Kapoor and Bikram Singh; retired Air Chief Marshals Nirmal Chandra Suri and Shashindra Pal Tyagi, and retired Admiral Madhvendera Singh. Colonel (Retd) Pushpender Singh (ex-3 Grenadiers) and Havaldar (Retd) Major Singh (Ex-3 Sikh Light Infantry), began hunger strike-unto-death at Jantar Mantar. Havildar Major Singh belongs to the same Regiment as Retired General Ved Malik, former Chief of army Staff. They were joined by Havildar Ashok Chauhan, Corps of signals, on 18 August. 18 August 2015

General Dalbir Singh Suhag, Chief of Army Staff, late in the night on 17 August, called Major General Satbir Singh, and urged him to meet with Nripendra Misra, Principal Secretary to the PM, on 18 August 2015. Major General Satbir Singh and Lt General Balbir Singh, representatives of the ex servicemen, after initial hesitation, met Nripendra Misra, Principal Secretary to the PM, at 1000h on 18 August 2015, to discuss resolution of the OROP. This was first overture from the government to the Ex servicemen since the protest started in June 2015. Mr Misra urged the Ex Servicemen representatives to end the protest. The ex-servicemen representatives informed Mr Misra that ex servicemen will end their protest only after the Government gives an assurance that it will not alter the accepted definition of OROP, implement OROP for all pensioners with effect from 1 April 2014, and ensure that all future enhancements will be automatically passed on to past pensioners. Mr Misra failed to give an assurance on the issues raised by the Ex servicemen. During the meeting Mr Misra was reminded of BJP's commitment, made in its manifesto, to build a martyrs memorial and set up veterans’ commission, to be manned by veterans. Mr Misra seemed unaware of these commitments by the BJP. In the presence of the ex-servicemen representatives, Mr Misra called the Defense Secretary and asked him to brief him on these subjects.

21 August 2015

Vijay Singh, (IPS- 2005), Deputy Commissioner Police,(DCP)-1 New Delhi, who led the police contingent to evict Armed Forces veterans from the Jantar Mantar was transferred as Deputy Commissioner of Police(DCP) North West District. Delhi Police PRO Rajan Bhagat called it a routine transfer, and denied media reports that this was because of police action against veterans on 14 August 2015.

22 August 2015

Rallies by Ex servicemen in support of the OROP movement were held in Udham Singhn Nagar, Mohali, and Mysore.

23 August 2015

On 70 day of the Relay Hunger Strike (RHS), called Satyagraha by some ex-servicemen, 25 Ex-servicemen, from 14 Indian States, were on RHS at Jantar Mantar. The fast unto death by Col Pushpender Singh(Grenadiers), and Havaldar Major Singh (Sikh Light Infantry) entered the eighth day, and by Hav Ashok Kumar Chauhan (Signals) the sixth day.

United Front of Ex-Servicemen (UFESM) organized a candle light march, and vigil, to honor, and remember, armed forces members killed in the 1965 war. Over 4000 ex-servicemen, and civilians, participated in the event. Participants lit candles, and laid bouquets at Amar Jawan Jyoti, at India Gate. "Sainik parliament" had passed a resolution to boycott all government functions, including by the armed forces, till implementation of OROP.

Veterans and their wives, including and war widows, protested police action on 14 August, against the veterans in Delhi, and delay in implementing OROP, in Dehradun, the State capital of Uttarakhand. Participants included Lt Gen TPS Rawat, (4 Gorkha Rifles), a former minister, Lt General Gambhir Singh Negi (former Colonel of 3 Gorkha Rifles), Maj Gen Lalji D Singh (Corps of Engineers, Bombay Sappers), Maj Gen Chander Nandwani, Brig KG Behl, Brig RS Rawat, Brig Vijay Kumar, Col PL Prashar, Col GS Cheema Col AK Khullar, Brig CB Thapa, Col SC Tyagi, Maj SS Chowdhury, and Col Kukreti, first JSW course

A joint Kisan rally- ex-servicemen was held at Satara. the rally was attended amongst others by Anna Hazare. An estimated 10,000 people attended the rally.

Large number of ex-servicemen, and civilian supporters, visited Jantar Mantar, to show solidarity with ESM cause. These included: officers from Short Service Courses (SS) 2, and 31; National Defence Academy (NDA) course 46 and 75; 55 and 85 Indian Military Academy; and officers from the 14 Army Education Course; and twenty five officers and their families came from Jaipur. Old veterans supporting the movement included Sep Ram Kishan, 93 years, Armoured Corp veteran of World War II; Sep Ram Bharose Yadav, 85 years, a blind veteran of 72 Medium Artillery; and Mrs Savita Rai Singh wife of Brig Rai Singh(90 Year old) Maha Vir Chakra.

24 August 2015

Colonel Pushpendra Singh, one of three veterans on hunger strike at Jantar Mantar, was evacuated to Army Research and Referral Hospital, Delhi, in a private car, due to deteriorating condition.

25 August 2015

On 72 day of the Relay Hunger Strike (RHS), 37 Ex-servicemen were on RHS at Jantar Mantar. Col Pushpender Singh(Grenadiers), was in the Intensive Care Unit (ICU), Army Research and Referral Hospital ( R&R), Havaldar ( Hav) Major Singh (Sikh Light Infantry), on 10th day of his fast unto death refused to be evacuated; and Hav Ashok Kumar Chauhan (Signals) on the 8th day, was vacuated to R&R due to muscle atrophy. The other hunger strikers, who were all fit, were: Major Piar Chand, 2 Grenadiers; Hav Sahib Singh, 2 Rajputana Rifles; and Naik Uday Singh Rawat of 12 Garhwal Rifles.

Visitors included Rajeev Chandrasekhar Indep MP Rajya Sabha; and Ms Nalini Singh, Journalist. The meals for the day were provided by Gurdwara Bangla Sahib, and Col Gurdeep Singh.

General Satbir Singh met Ajit Doval, National Security Adviser and Former head of Intelligence Bureau. This is the first report of NSA's interest and concern in OROP. The outcome of this meeting and issues discussed is not known. According to Media reports Doval is expected to take an "overall view of the situation" and be involved in the "final negotiations".

26 August 2015

Major General Satbir Singh (Retd), head of the Indian Ex-Servicemen Movement, met Nripendra Misra, Principal Secretary to PM. General Dalbir Singh, COAS, was present at the meeting.

27 August 2015

Capt Amarinder Singh, Congress MP and former Punjab chief minister, a 1965 war veteran, declared his support for OROP.

On 74 day of the Relay Hunger Strike (RHS), at Jantar Mantar, 39 Ex-servicemen and four war widows (Veer Narees) were on RHS. In Ambala and Pathankot, RHS entered the 70th day and 74th day respectively.

There were 8 person on indefinite fast, 4 at Janatr Mantar, and 4 in Research and Referrals Army Hospital (RR): Col Pushpender Singh(Grenadiers), in RR, twelfth day. Hav Ashok Kumar Chauhan(Signals), in RR, 10th day. Major Piar Chand and Hav Sahib Singh were evacuated to Research and Referrals on advice of the doctors.

Havildar Major Singh (Sikh Light Infantry), at Jantar Mantar, on the 12th day of his fast was joined by his brother. In addition there are four more soldiers, and a father of a martyred soldier Sunil Kumar Yadav, on indefinite fast, at Jantar Mantar.

Visitors to Jantar Mantar included: Mrs. Charu Sheela(95 yrs) mother of Col. Pushpender; representative of Rashtra Sewak Trust; Air Marshal J S Bawa and Lt Gen Suri; and Officers from 10th NDA and 19th IMA courses. Breakfast and Lunch was provided by SSC NT-27 & Technical-18 and Gurudwara Bangla Sahib.

28 August 2015

Ex Servicemen representatives including Major General (retd) Satbir Singh, Chairman of the Indian Ex-Servicemen Movement, and Group Captain VK Gandhi, meet Rajnath Singh, Home Minister, in his office in the Ministry of Home Affairs, in Delhi, at his invitation. This is the first meeting between officials of the MHA and ex servicemen since 14 August Police action against ex servicemen in Jantar Mantar.

Pranab Mukherjee, President of India, laid a wreath at the Amar Jawan Jyoti, at India Gate. Military veterans boycott official function at India Gate to mark the start of month-long golden jubilee celebrations of the 1965 war.

A "parallel commemoration" of 1965 war coinciding with the capture of Hajipir Pass by Major Ranjit Singh Dyal, MVC, 1 Parachute Regiment, is attended by several veterans of the 1965 war, including Brigadier (retd) D P Nayar, a veteran of the attack on Hajipir, and Wing Commander (retd) Vinod Nebb. Wing Commander Vinod Nebb who was 22, in 1965, on 6 September, on an alert from air defense commander, Ambala, while on a combat air patrol sortie over Ludhiana, Punjab, brought down a Pakistani Sabre jet fighter for which he was awarded Vir Chakra, India's third highest gallantry award. The Times of India, in an editorial comment wrote that Ex Servicemen demands of OROP are "not a sustainable proposition" and taxpayer money "will be recklessly splurged if the demand is accepted."

31 August 2015

On the 78th day of the Relay Hunger Strike (RHS), Havildar Major Singh (Sikh Light Infantry), who had been on fast since 16 August, was joined by Naik Udai Singh Rawat, Sawal Ram Yadav, father of martyr Lance Naik Sunil Kumar Yadav, navy Commander A.K. Sharma, Subedar Vijay Singh Yadav and Subedar Keshaw Singh.

Ram Jethmalani, former BJP member, visited Jantar Mantar, declared support for OROP, and blamed the finance minister for delay in implementing OROP.

1 September 2015

On 79th day of the Relay Hunger Strike (RHS), there were 28 Ex-servicemen, and wives of three Ex servicemen on Relay Hunger Strike at Jantar Mantar. In Ambala and Pathankot, the RHS entered the 75th and 79th day respectively. There were 4 ex servicemen on hunger strike in the army Hospital, and 8 at Jantar Mantar. Hav Major Singh, who had been on fast since 16 August, had lost 10 kilo of weight. He continued to refuse to end his 17 days old fast, take medicine, or be evacuated to a hospital.

3 September 2015

Ex servicemen Representative Maj General Satbir Singh while acknowledging that he had met with Nripendra Misra, Principal Secretary to PM, made clear there were no ongoing negotiations with the government. Referring to questions raised on the financial implications of OROP he said that when the government sanctioned Non Functional Upgrades to the All India Services after the 6th Pay Commission no question on the financial implications was raised.

5 September 2015

The government unilaterally announced the implementation the 'OROP Scheme' for the Armed Forces.

17 October 2015

Rajyavardhan Singh Rathore, former colonel, MP from Rajasthan, and Minister of State for Information and Broadcasting in the BJP Government, in an interview to a TV news-channel, denounced the Ex servicemen for continuing with their protest.

7 November 2015

The department of Ex-Servicemen Welfare, Ministry of Defence, as a follow up to the 5 September announcement, issued a order on "One Rank One Pension (OROP) to the Defence Forces Personnel ".

The OROP order excluded all future Armed Forces retirees who take premature retirement from OROP entitlement.

9 November 2015

The ex servicemen announced that they would start returning their medals on 10–11 November, across the country, to District Magistrates, who have been informed to collect the medals, Group Captain VK Gandhi (retd), the general secretary of Indian Ex-servicemen Movement (IESM), said. The protesting ex-servicemen also met Delhi Chief Minister Arvind Kejriwal to brief him about the government notification on OROP. Kejriwal informed Group Captain VK Gandhi (retd).

10 November 2015

Manohar Parrikar, denounces Ex-servicemen decision to return medals; and calls protesting ex-servicemen emotional and disgruntled.

11 November 2015

On Diwali military veterans called for a ‘Black Diwali’ and marched to Rashtrapati Bhavan to meet with the President. The marchers were intercepted by Delhi Police near Rail Bhavan.

13 November 2015

Arvind Kejriwal, Delhi Chief Minister, visited ex-servicemen protesting at Jantar Mantar. He urged the government "to immediately accept the demands of the veterans".

16 November 2015

Brig Harwant Singh (retd), representative of United Front of Ex-servicemen, said the OROP movement is not about money, but about self-respect and izzat.

19 November 2015

7th Pay Commission, headed by Justice A K Mathur, in its 900-page report, recommended OROP, without calling it one-rank-one-pension (OROP), for all central government employees, including para-military personnel as well as defence civilians who have retired before 1 January 2016.

Seventh Central Pay Commission (7CPC), in its consideration of one rank one pay, noted that France, China, and Germany have pension schemes for the armed forces, much like India. The US and UK have a similar scheme, called a "defined benefit scheme".

On the contentious issue of Non - Functional Upgradation, there was disagreement between the chairman of 7CPC and the members of the commission. Chairman "felt that NFU should be allowed to continue since it has existed for the last 10 years and is being availed by all the Organised Group ‘A’ Services", and that it "should be extended to the officers of the Defence forces and CAPFs". Vivek Rae, IAS, and Dr. Rathin Roy, Members, Seventh CPC, disagreed. They felt that NFU till SAG and HAG level, granted to Organised Group ‘A’ Services, should be withdrawn, and did not support extension of "NFU to Defence Forces and CAPFs, including ICG".

4 December 2015

Rao Inderjit Singh, by Minister of State for Defence, confirmed that Government will appoint a "Judicial Committee to look into anomalies" including issues concerning "methodology for fixation of pension, periodicity of its revision, coverage of future PMR cases" raised by veterans.

Deepender Hooda, Congress MP, criticizing BJP Government failure to implement full OROP, said that Congress supports the demands of the veterans, including annual review of OROP instead of 5 year review as notified by the BJP Government; and OROP for those who take premature retirement. The Congress Party, he said, will take the OROP issue forward in parliament by seeking funds for the implementation of OROP.

7 December 2015

The United Front of Ex-Servicemen (UFESM) suggested Justice R M Lodha for the chair of the one-man judicial commission to look into the concerns of the veterans.

14 December 2015

The Department of Ex Servicemen issued a notification on the appointment of Justice L. Narasimha Reddy, former Chief Justice of the Patna High Court, as the one-man judicial commission to look into the implementation of the one rank one pension scheme. The terms of reference for the committee included measures for the removal of anomalies that may arise in the implementation of the OROP as notified by the government on 7 November 2015; measures for the removal of anomalies that may arise out of inter-services issues of the three forces due to its implementation; and implications on service matters.

16 December 2015

UFESM, to mark victory on the Indian Armed Forces in the 1971 war, and pay Homage to 'Martyrs of Independent India', held a flag raising ceremony at India Gate. The event was attended by large number of veterans. Wreaths were laid by several veterans, at Amar Jawan Jyoti, including Lt Col Inderjit Singh, Chairman All India Ex-Services Welfare Association, Maj Gen Satbir Singh, SM, Vice Chairman IESM, and Col Anil Kaul VrC. After the event UFESM issued a press release in which it deplored the delay in establishing a war memorial, the failure of the government to commemorate the victory in the 1971 War, and that of all the civilians gathered at India gate none new of the historic significance of 16 December or the 1971 war. To commemorate the historic victory, and the martyrs who scarified their lives, UFESM urged the government to declare 16 December a national holiday.

23 December 2015

General Dalbir Suhag, Chief of the Army Staff (COAS); Admiral Robin Dhowan, Chief of the Naval Staff (CNS); and Air Chief Marshal Arup Raha, Chief of the Air Staff (CAS), in a joint memorandum to the Manohar Parrikar, defence minister, have urged the defence Minister to appoint an expert committee, with members from the armed forces, to examine and reconcile the pay, pension, allowances, and status anomalies exacerbated by 7CPC report, which had no representation from the armed Forces.

=== 2016 ===
15 January 2016

Veterans participating in an Army Day event in Dehradun reiterated their demands for implementation of full and agreed to "one rank, one post" (OROP). "It is sad for everyone that even now when Parliament has approved OROP, some unnecessary spokes have been put in its implementation," said Brig (retd) K G Behl, president of Dehradun Ex-servicemen League.

17 January 2016

About 200 veterans including Major General Satbir Singh, protested outside 2, Krishna Menon, Marg, New Delhi, the official residence of Finance Minister Arun Jaitley. The protesters highlight Jaitley's failure to take heed of their concerns, and breaking his promise given to them on 3 January that he would speak with Manohar Parrikar, Defence Minister, and 'get back' within a week on status of OROP issues that need to be resolved. Group Captain (retd) VK Gandhi. The protest ended late in the evening, after a meeting with Jayant Sinha, Minister of State for Finance. Disappointed veterans returned to Jantar Mantar, where they have been protesting since 14 June 2015.

18 January 2016

Jayant Sinha, Minister of State for Finance, met veterans briefly. Sinha, according to Col. Anil Kaul (retd), a spokesperson for the Indian Ex-Servicemen's Movement, will meet with Ex servicemen again on 20 January.

21 January 2016

As a follow up on the meeting with Jayant Sinha, Minister of State for Finance, on 16 January, and on his prompting, Lt Gen Balbir Singh, President IESL, Lt Col Inderjit Singh, Chairman AIEWA and Maj Gen Satbir Singh, Chairman IESM & Adviser UFESM (JM), sent a joint letter to 'people who matter' urging them to address the anomalies in 7 November 15 notification on implementation of OROP. The letter titled 'Urgent Need to Rectify Anomalies in OROP in Govt notification dated 7 Nov 15", which has the 'approval of 200 veteran organization', is addressed to Manohar Parrikar, Raksha Mantri, Mr Arun Jaitley, Finance Minister, Jayant Sinha, Minister of State, Finance, General Dalbir Singh, Chief of Army Staff, Air Chief Marshal Arup Raha, Chief of the Air Staff & Chairman Chiefs of Staffs Committee (CoSC), and Admiral RK Dhowan, Chief of Naval Staff.

3 February 2016

A Ministry of Defence press release claimed that it had fulfilled OROP, a 'demand of the Defence Forces personnel' that had been pending for '42 years'. The detailed letter on the implementation of OROP, including table for calculation of pension was issued by Department of Ex Servicemen.

4 February 2016

Colonel Anil Kaul (Retd), spokesperson for the Indian Ex servicemen, denounced the BJP Governments claims on OROP implementation, saying "OROP tables short-change widows, reservists, battle casualties, havildars, subedars and subedar majors. The Jantar Mantar protest will continue and legal options will be exercised".

Former Army Chief General Ved Prakash Malik, and Secretary, Ministry of Defence, Ajay Prasad, in a panel discussion on TV, argued in favor of OROP even for those who opt to take that 'pre-mature retirement (PMR) for what ever reason, to keep the armed forces young.

10 March

On 10 March, late in the evening, a squad of five plain-clothes men from the Haryana Police forced their way into the house of Wing Commander Sharma, 75, former IAF officer and fighter pilot and veteran of the 1965 war and the 1971 War, and arrested him. The raid and the arrest was made following an old complaint alleging financial wrongdoing by IESM leadership by Lt Gen Raj Kadyan, formerly Rajputana Rifles, former Chairman of the IESM, considered close to the present government. The complaint also named Maj General Satbir Singh, the present head of the IESM, and Group Captain VK Gandhi, both of whom secured anticipatory bail from the Chandigarh high court.

25 March

Maj Gen Satbir Singh,(Retd), Chairman Indian Ex-Servicemen Movement (IESM), wrote to L.Narasimha Reddy, Retired Chief Justice of Patna High Court and head of the commission on OROP scheme, and the Defence Minister, on "Urgent Need to Rectify Anomalies in OROP". The letter drew attention to the Government's executive order dated 26 Feb 14 for the implementation of OROP, and the notification issued on 7 November 2015. The letter examined five salient anomalies in the OROP scheme 2015 as follows: (1) Fixation of pension as per calendar year 2013 would result in past retirees getting less pension of one increment than the soldier retiring today. This will completely destroy definition of OROP approved by two Parliaments and will also result in loss of one increment across the board for past pensioners in perpetuity. (2) Fixing pension as mean of Min and Max pension of 2013 would result in more anomalies wherein same ranks with same length of service will draw two or more different pensions thus violating the very principle of OROP. (3) OROP has been approved in budget of 2014-15 by two parliaments. As per norms of Government, all proposals approved in budget are applicable from 1st April of that FY. In the case of OROP, the Govt had issued specific orders to its applicability wef 1st April 14. Hence implementation date for OROP from 1st July will be against the Parliament approval. Changing the date would result in loss of 3 months emoluments for OROP across the board. However, if OROP implementation date is to be kept as 1st July, then the base pension should also be accepted as per the PPOs of July 2014. (4) Pension equalisation every five year will result in a senior rank soldier drawing lesser pension than a junior rank soldier for five years thus OROP definition will be violated for five years. This will also result in permanent violation of definition as fresh cases will come up every year. (5) There are numerous errors in the constitution of Tables. How this Table have been made is not known. The fact is that no senior rank defence personnel should ever draw less pension their junior persons. There are numerous instances in the Tables where in the senior rank and senior in service have been shown to draw less pension then his junior. The tables need to be worked out afresh after all anomalies have been removed. The most appropriate method to construct Tables would be to base these tables on live data. The PPOs of defence personnel who retired in 2013 would removal that a Sepoy with 15 years of service should get pension of approx Rs 7200 per month where as in the Tables, pension has been mentioned as Rs 6665/-. This does not satisfy the approved OROP definition. There are minimum such examples. Nb Subedar of ‘Y’ group has been shown to get less than X Gp Havildar this making a senior rank defence, personal gets less than junior rank. Nb Sub TA is shown getting more pension then Regular Nb Sub. The three Service HQs pay cells must be involved in making this Table afresh. These anomalies will result in lesser pensions to widows, soldiers, NCOs and JCOs than what will be due to them on approval of OROP. This will result in veterans not getting OROP as per approved definition and will create much discontent across all ranks. There is a need to have a relook at the pensions of Hon Nb Subedars, Majors and Lt Cols. a) Some Havildars are granted rank of Hon Naib Subedar in view of their exemplary service. These soldiers are not granted pension of Naib Subedar thus making the Hon rank just ceremonial. Hon Naib Subedars should get pension of a Naib Subedar rather than that of a Havildar. Similarly, this must be accepted as a principle and it should be applicable to all Hon ranks in case of NCOs and JCOs. b) Moreover no officer is retiring in Major rank now. In the past, officers were promoted to Major rank after completing 13 yrs of service whereas present officers are getting promotion of Lt Col in 13 yrs. It will be justified to grant all pensioners of the rank of Major, minimum pension of Lt Col as they cannot be compared to present retirees as officers are not retiring as Majors any more. Number of such affected officers is not more than 800 and will not cause heavy burden to Govt. c) Similarly, all pre-2004 retiree Lt Cols should get the minimum pension of full Col. Presently all officers retire in the rank of Colonel hence all Lt Col equivalents should be granted min pension of Colonels. The above anomalies/discrepancies are being brought before you for resolution please. The Finance Minister in the interim budget speech on 17 Feb 14 announced that Government had accepted the 'principle' of OROP for Defence forces. This was followed by the issue of an Implementation order on 26 Feb 14. The demand note was however never raised by the Ministry Of Defence.

28 March

A delegation of Civil Service officers representing the "Confederation of Civil Service Associations" submitted a memorandum on "their long standing grievance of discrimination vis-a-vis certain other All-India Services" to Jitendra Singh, Union Minister of State MoS, in Prime Ministers Office (PMO), and minister in-charge of Personnel, Public Grievances, Pensions. The "Confederation of Civil Service Associations" in their memorandum, claiming "that the majority view in the 7th CPC was in favour of changing the status-quo on the issue of pay disparity" demanded "parity" with "other services". The memorandum noted that the "main cause of resentment among the non-IAS Civil Service Officers was that all the senior level posts covering majority of Departments, be it technical or administrative, are today manned by IAS Officers. The Civil service Association which includes Defence Civilian services, demanded : [a] "equitable treatment ...so that the gap between the IAS and other Services does not widen and lead to.. chaotic situation; [b] Pay- disparity be removed altogether; and [c] the "Committee of Secretaries" to examine the report of the 7th CPC, be reconstituted to "represent all different sections of stakeholders" so that it may function with "neutrality"

29 March

Parrikar told India Today that "The Seventh Pay Commission are in the form of recommendations. I do not think they (recommendations) will remain. I do not consider them as finalities. I have flagged them and will flag them properly at the right level".

6 April

The Cabinet gave its ex-post facto approval for implementation order dated OROP order of 7 November 2015 on One Rank One Pension (OROP). The cabinet decision reiterates that "Personnel who opt to get discharged henceforth on their own request under Rule 13(3) 1(i)(b), 13(3) 1(iv) or Rule 16B of the Army Rule. 1954 or equivalent Navy or Air Force Rules will not be entitled to the benefits of OROP. ", and that "In future, the pension would be re-fixed every 5 year".

"Financial implications on account of grant of OROP including Pre-Matured Retirees (PMR) cases" according to press Information note " would be Rs. 10925.11 crore for payment of arrears and the recurring annual financial implication would be Rs. 7488.7 crore. Till 31st March, 2015. 91 lakh pensioners have been given the first instalment of OROP, which amounts to Rs. 2,861 crore. Information is being gathered for processing on priority basis, the cases of 1.15 lakh pensioners after filling in the gaps of information such as the length of service being assessed, etc."

21 April 2016

Sashi Tharoor, former Under-Secretary-General of the United Nations, and former minister in UPA Government, in an article in The quint, commenting on the policy of the government on the declining pay, pensions, and protocol status, of the armed forces, affirmed that the dignity of the Indian armed forces has been eroded by "Petty slights, ranging from deliberately downgrading the military in protocol terms, to persistent actions to lower the status and compensation of our military personnel", and that the consequences of this policy of demeaning the armed forces " will inevitably be suffered by all". Blaming the Pay Commission and Government for being "blind" to the "enduring sacrifice" of the Armed Forces, he concludes that "We have short-changed the remuneration of our armed servicemen". He found it hard to understand the reason for the Government and pay commission to equate police officers[ and defence civilians] with 12 years of service, designated as deputy inspector general (DIG) of the police, with Brigadiers, for pay and protocol. He wonders, in disbelief, "What could possibly justify such a disparity?" Commenting on disability pensions recommended by the 7 Pay Commission, he notes that whereas a JCO and their equivalents in the air-force and the navy, will be given Rs 12,000 as pension, while his civilian counterpart, for the same level of disability, will receive a pension twice that amount (Rs 27,690).

28 April 2016

Ram Jethmalani, Senior Supreme Court lawyer, while addressing armed forces veterans, on 320th day of their protest at Jantar Mantar, said, "he will lead their legal battle in the apex court" on a Pro bono basis. Major General (retd) Satbir Singh, who was present on the occasion said, "case will be filed in Supreme Court in the next 3-4 days". He added that four more cases have been filed in the armed forces tribunal, on " rulings for Jawans, war widows, arrears since 2006, payments for honorary ranks, rounding off of disability pension, and payments of reservists".

15 June 2016

The six-month tenure of the one man judicial commission on One Rank One Pension (OROP) which ended on 15 June, was given an extension of six months, by the Government. In the wake of the extension to the commission headed Justice L. Narasimha Reddy, former Chief Justice of Patna High Court, veterans Maj Gen Satbir Singh, Chairman of the Indian Ex-Servicemen Movement, Hon Lt K Pande Member and Wing Commander CK Sharma, met Manohar Parrikar, Defence Minister, to urge him to ensure that the 'four deviations in the implementation order' on OROP are addressed. Mr Parrikar, according to media reports, assured the veteran delegation that their concerns will be addressed; and that the recommendations of seventh pay commission would be applicable to all ex-servicemen

3 August 2016

Maj. Gen. Satbir Singh (retd), Chairman of the Indian Ex-Servicemen Movement wrote to Mr. Parrikar and Justice L. Narasimha Reddy, former Chief Justice of the Patna High Court, and head of the one-man judicial commission of constituted in December last year, conveying the "anguish and concern" of ex-servicemen on the "neglect of defence personnel" and "betrayal" by the government. He told the Hindu newspaper that the Defence Ministry did not forward representation by exservicemen to the one-man Committee despite "assurances given by Mr. Parrikar on March 14, 2016 during a meeting of representatives of ex-servicemen". Maj. Gen. Satbir Singh in the letter to the Defence Minister noted that "The mandate given to One-Man Committee is to consider those questions/issues which have been referred to it by the Defence Ministry. This is a serious breach of trust reposed in the system".

12 August 2016

A committee of Jammu and Kashmir Ex Services League (JKESL) presided over by Maj Gen Goverdhan Singh Jamwal, ex-MLC, decided, in Jammu, on submitting a memorandum to Justice Reddy Commission on 19 Aug 2016 stating that OROP should be implemented without dilution, i.e., "All retirees in the same rank and with same length of service should get the same pension irrespective of the date of retirement; and the benefits of future increases should automatically pass on to all such retirees". Other who participated in the committee's deliberations were: Brig Harcharan Singh, Director Rajya Sainik Board; Brig RL Sharma former Station Commander Jammu; Brig Anil Gupta Former Director J&K NCC; Col K S Jamwal, Jt Chairman JKESL; Col Virendra K Sahi, VrC Director War Decorated India for J&K, Col Rajinder Singh, Gen Secy; Lt Col DS Salaria Treasurer JKESL, Lt Col KS Samyal OIC Pension Cell, Lt Col MS Jamwal and Maj JS Baloria Finance Secretary JKESL.

26 October 2016

Justice L. Narasimha Reddy, retired Chief Justice of Patna High Court, submits his report on the anomalies in the implementation of OROP to the MOD.

11 November 2016

Subhash Bhamre, Minister of State for Defence, in a written reply to question by Alok Sanjar informed Lokha Sabha that Financial year 2016–17, a sum of Rs. 12456 crore has been provided for expected expenditure on account of One Rank One Pension (OROP)

and that out 20,63,529 pensioner beneficiaries, 1,27,561 Defence Pensioners/Family Pensioners are yet to get the benefits of OROP.

19 November 2016

Maj Gen (retd) Satbir Singh, while attending a workshop organised by the Uttarakhand Ex-Servicemen League in Dehradun said that the BJP Government had dishonored ex-servicemen by denying them OROP. He called the OROP implemented by the BJP Government "disabled OROP". Maj Gen Satbir called on ex-servicemen to participate in the elections in Uttarkhand and Punjab and " tilt the scale". Group Captain PK Gandhi (retd), another OROP leader, said "ex-servicemen were instrumental in the BJP coming to power at the Centre and they also have the power to dislodge it". Ex-servicemen rallies are planned in Uttar Pradesh, Uttarakhand and Punjab to appeal to ex servicemen to "vote for candidates who work in their favour". The workshop was attended among others by Lt Gen GS Negi (retd) and Lt Col SC Sharma (retd).

22 November 2016

Arjun Ram Meghwal, Minister of State in the Ministry of Finance, in written reply to a question in Rajya Sabha stated that Rs. 82,332.66 crore was provided in BE 2016-17 towards payment of Defence Pensions. This included an amount of Rs. 12,456 crore towards implementation of One Rank One Pension Scheme, which takes effect from 1 July 2014.

Subhash Bhamre, Minister of State for Defence, in response to question by PL Punia and Pramod Tiwari informed the Rajya Sabha that Justice L. Narasimha Reddy, retired Chief Justice of Patna High Court, who was to look into anomalies in the implementation of OROP submitted his report on 26 October 2016. This report is under examination. There are 20,63,529 pensioner beneficiaries of OROP. 1429 Ex-Servicemen have submitted complaints with regard to OROP benefits.

25 November 2016

Manohar Parrikar, Defence Minister, to a question by Dr. Satyapal Singh, in a written reply informed the Lok Sabha that Ex-Servicemen are being paid enhanced pension after the implementation of One Rank One Pension (OROP) scheme. Details of the allocation and utilization of funds under OROP are as under:

Financial Year	Allocation under OROP	Utilization on account of arrears of OROP
2015-16	No separate allocation made under OROP	Rs.3000 crores (approx.)
2016-17	Rs.12456 crores	Rs.3020.97 crores (as on 12.11.2016)

Referring to Subedar Ram Kishan Grewal, retired, who committed suicide at Delhi on 1 November 2016, over the delay in getting his pension dues, the minister informed that he was drawing pension of Rs.22,608 per month. He was however entitled to revised pension under OROP of Rs.25,634 per month. The arrears amounting to Rs.53,978, he confirmed, was credited to Bank Account- Subedar Ram Kishan Grewal on 8 November 2016.

29 November 2016

Subhash Bhamre, Minister of State for Defence, in a written reply to D Raja informed the Rajya Sabha that the "United Front Movement of Ex-Servicemen is continuing their 'protest action' since 14th June 2015 for their demands on OROP." The reply says that Government has accepted the demands of Ex-Servicemen associations to implement OROP, and pay arrears starting from 1 July 2014, and provide coverage to Premature Retirees (PMR) cases up to 7 November 2015. The reply acknowledges that "Some Ex-Servicemen Associations have been demanding changes in methodology for fixation of pension, periodicity of its revision, coverage of future PMR cases".

Subhash Bhamre Minister of State for Defence, informed in the Rajya Sabha that the MOD will not alter the rank equivalence tabulations between armed forces officers and Armed Forces Headquarters Civil Service (AFHQ CS) circulated by MOD on 18 October 2016. When asked in the Rajya sabha, whether the MOD was considering "correcting the discrepancies that have arisen as a result of this disturbance of rank equations", he replied the question "does not arise".

== See also ==
- One Rank One Pension Scheme
- Rank Pay
- Sixth Central Pay Commission
- 7th Central Pay Commission (CPC) and Defence Forces
- Defence pensions, India
- Indian Ex Servicemen Movement
- Department of Ex-servicemen Welfare
