= The Regional Provident Fund Commissioner, West Bengal (II) v. Vivekananda Vidyamandir and Others =

2019 Supreme Court of India case

The Regional Provident Fund Commissioner (II) West Bengal vs. Vivekananda Vidyamandir and Others
- Court: Supreme Court of India
- Full case name: The Regional Provident Fund Commissioner (II) West Bengal vs. Vivekananda Vidyamandir and Others.
- Decided: 28 February 2019
- Citation: AIR 2019 SUPREME COURT 1240, AIRONLINE 2019 SC 133, 2019 LAB IC 1528, (2019) 161 FACLR 139, (2019) 1 SERVLJ 39

Court membership
- Judges sitting: Navin Sinha, Arun Mishra and M.R. Shah

Case opinions
- Wage components paid across the board universally to all the employees must be considered for computation of contributions under the EPF & MP Act, 1952.
- Concurrence: Navin Sinha, Arun Mishra and M.R. Shah

The Regional Provident Fund Commissioner (II) West Bengal vs. Vivekananda Vidyamandir and Others or simply Vivekananda Vidyamandir case, (AIR 2019 SC 1240) was a 2019 Indian Supreme Court decision which laid down the principles on how contributions to Employees' Provident Fund Organisation have to be computed by the employers.

== Facts ==
The Employees' Provident Fund and Miscellaneous Provisions (EPF&MP) Act, 1952, mandates employers to pay 12% of an employee's salary (consisting of basic wages, Dearness allowance, retaining allowance and value of food contribution) as a contribution on behalf of employer and employee each towards employees provident fund and employees pension fund every month.

This case pertains to a number of appeals filed with the Supreme Court of India to determine whether special allowances such as canteen allowances, conveyance allowances, management allowances, medical allowances, night shift differential payments, rent allowances, special allowances, and travel allowances would be considered as "basic wages" under the Act.

The main employer respondent, Vivekananda Vidyamandir, is an unaided school giving special allowance by way of incentive to teaching and nonteaching staff pursuant to an agreement between the staff and the management. The incentive was reviewed from time to time upon enhancement of the tuition fees of the students. The authority under the EPF Act held that the special allowance was to be included in basic wage for deduction of provident fund. The Single Judge of Calcutta High Court set aside the order. The Division Bench initially after examining the salary structure allowed the appeal on 13.01.2005 holding that the special allowance was a part of dearness allowance liable to deduction. The order was recalled on 16.01.2007 at the behest of the respondent employer as none had appeared on its behalf. The subsequent Division Bench dismissed the appeal holding that the special allowance was not linked to the consumer price index, and therefore did not fall within the definition of basic wage, thus not liable to deduction.

== Decision ==
The Supreme Court noted that for a wage component to be excluded from the provident fund calculation, the employers need to demonstrate that the component paid to employees was either variable or an incentive payment.

In this decision, the court determined that wage components routinely paid to all employees are basic wages, and special payments that are only paid under specific conditions are not basic wages.

The Supreme Court accordingly upheld the factual conclusions arrived at by the respective appellant PF authorities and held that allowances which are universally and ordinarily paid were part of basic wages under the EPF & MP Act, 1952.
