= Rank Pay =

Pay scheme of the Indian government

Rank Pay is a scheme implemented by the Rajiv Gandhi led Indian National Congress (I) Government in 1986, in the wake of 4th Central Pay Commission (4CPC), that reduced the basic-pay, or grade pay, of seven armed officers ranks of 2nd Lieutenant, Lieutenant, captain, majors, lt-colonel, colonels, and brigadiers, and their equivalent in the Air Force and the Navy by fixed amounts designated as 'rank-pay'. The reduction in the basic-pay, the established basis of determining rank equivalences between armed forces officers and civilian and police counterparts, altered long established historical grade-pay equivalences or parities between armed forces officers and police officer, which was an accepted principle since 1947 for determination of armed forces grade pay, and which was 'further cemented' in 1973, by the 3 Central Pay Commission (3CPC). The reduction in grade-pay apart from causing asymmetries in rank equivalence between the officers from the Indian Police Service and armed forces affected the basic pay, allowances, entitlements, promotion prospects, status, and pension of thousands of officers in the service in January 1986, and the decades after that. In 2012, reduction in armed forces grade-pay, which was a subject of litigation since 1994, was declared illegal by the Supreme Court of India, which in a landmark judgement ordered the government to pay arrears to the more than 20,000 affected officers of the armed forces.

The 'rank-pay' scheme apart from provoking contentious litigation, was one of the causes that fueled protracted protest by veterans over One Rank, One Pension (OROP); and, in the estimate of former chiefs of the armed forces, the degradation of armed forces ranks which rank-pay deductions from basic pay caused, affected armed forces morale and national security, about which they wrote letters to the Prime minister, including Narendra Modi. The legacy of reduction of grade-pay of armed forces lingers, and has variously affected the outcomes of the 5th, 6th and 7th Central Pay Commission.

== Measures ==
Rank-Pay implemented in 1986, was initiated and conceived during the tenure of S K Bhatnagar, Defence Secretary (July 1984 – May 1988). It was implemented by the Government led by Rajeev Gandhi who was both Prime Minister, and Defence Minister (1985–1987), and R. N. Kao, the PM's, police, security and intelligence adviser. Rank-Pay measures include [a] Implementation of a new pay system termed 'integrated running pay scale' ( Rs. 2300-100-3900-150-4200-EB-150-5100, covering a span of 28 years) for all ranks from Second Lieutenant till Brigadier( while retaining the existing system for civil services, including the Police); [b] the new basic-pay for captains till brigadier is depressed to the extent it excludes the rank pay component, which has been deducted; (c) rank-pay( which varies from Rs 200 to 1200 depending on rank) is explained by the 4CPC as well as the MOD as 'additional element', and not some thing that was deducted from the basic-pay; (d) in the MOD, and police led security apparatus, functional relationships between armed forces officers and police officers are reconfigured on the basis of the existence of new armed forces 'basic-pays'( i.e., basic-pay minus rank pay); [d] the new parities, are, however, not defined. The new reduced basic-pay distorts long established historical basic-pay parities between the armed forces officers, and defence civilians officers, and the police led security and intelligence bureaucracy.

== Impact ==
The impact of the implementation of rank-pay on serving officers and veterans are diverse, lingering, and many of which are still unresolved. Rank-pay moderated basic-pay, the impact of which was neither properly examined or explained, affects armed forces organizational structure, functions, morale, and civil-military relations, especially military-police relations. Some of the major affects are of 'Rank pay', implementation are: [a] It degrades armed forces ranks including the highly selective ranks of lieutenant colonels, colonels, and brigadier; [b] Rank Pay deductions roils the Armed Forces, and distorts 'historical parities', and established pay based-status and protocol equations. [c] 'Rank-pay', affects the over all morale of the young officers, as its impacts most directly officers in crucial first 20 years of service; [e] Armed forces officers who had had an edge of two years over the police at the 13 year of service were 'demoted' and made equal in basic-pay to those with 4 years of service;[f] Colonel of the army, Group captain of the airforce, and captains of the navy, who had, since the inception of the police rank of Deputy Inspector General (DIG) (as the second senior most rank in the police), had had a higher pay grade, were placed in lower grade than DIGs, which had been made into a time scale appointment to which every one was automatically entitled on completion of 14 years of service; [g] armed officers, find it difficult to understand why the government has chosen to fix the basic pay of police officers and defence civilians, including auditors, with 13 years of service, at a higher level than of army, navy, and airforce officers with similar number of years of service; [h] It promotes bureaucracy rivalries, and unsustainable false equations and parities; [i] The new debased basic-pay for the armed forces with all its potential for distortions spawns resentment and protracted litigation, starting in 1996, which goes on desultorily for almost two decades. (j) In 2006, following the 6 CPC, the Government lends support to the false equation sought to be imposed by the Rajeev Gandhi Government in 1986, as Major Navdeep, a specialist on military pays, explains. In 1973, after the 3rd CPC, Lt Colonels were in the scale Rs 1750–1950, about the same as Civil Selection Grade Scale of 1650–1800 (3rd CPC). In 2006, following the 6CPC, and on the promptings of MOD, lieutenant colonels were demoted to Pay-band 3 with Grade pay of 7600, in comparison with civil and police counterparts who were placed in Pay Band-4 with Grade Pay of Rs 8700. This demotion was partially corrected after an unseemly stand off, and lieutenant colonels, wing commanders of the airforce, commanders of the navy, were reluctantly moved up to Pay Band-4 with Grade Pay Rs 8000, still Rs 700 below similarly placed officers with same length of service from civil services like the Indian Defence Accounts Service, and police service.

== Litigation ==
Rank-pay deductions from basic-pay, apart from being a cause of dismay, distress, and confusion in the armed forces, provoke decades of rancorous litigation between armed forces veterans, including widows, and the Ministry of Defence (MOD), exposing, very publicly, the distrust which the armed forces harbors against the MOD. Maj AK Dhanapalan, who first 'discovered' the flaws in rank-pay, and 4CPC, in 1996, went to court to seek legal redress. In 1997, after he retired, he spent the next ten years litigating 'rank pay' in the face of relentless opposition by the MOD. He wins his first case in 1998, but that is to no avail, as the Ministry of Defence appeals against the court decision. After protracted legal struggle, despite remorseless appeals by the MOD, the high court, in a landmark decision, declares 'rank-pay' deductions from basic-pay illegal. The Supreme Court concurs with high court decision that the 'rank pay' was wrongly deducted from basic pay.

== Legacy ==
The legacy of 4CPC and rank-pay lingers according to Navdeep Singh, a lawyer and expert on military pays, who closely follows issues affecting armed forces pay and pensions, lingers. Even after the 'rank-pay' deductions from basic-pay are held to be illegal by the highest court, the MOD continues its efforts to reconfigure military ranks: in 2006, after 6CPC, the new 'grade pay' is configured to achieve the intent of the rank-pay, triggering a storm of protest; and again, in 2016, after 7CPC, the BJP Government, implements differentiated pay matrix-es for the defence-civilians, police, and others, and the armed forces, the underling intent of which is the same as the introduction 'rank-pay' by the congress government, in 1986. Former Chief of Indian Army Ved Malik, and others, recognizing the intent of the BJP government decision, calls the decision blatantly 'discriminatory' and intended to degrade armed forces ranks in comparison with police time scale ranks. The BJP, despite its public protestations, has lent support to embedded legacy of the Rank-Pay, by deciding in favor of what have been called biased and discriminatory pay scales by the armed forces headquarters, and the Chiefs of the three services. It has yet to explain its stand or examine the larger issues represented by the continuing sense of unease in the armed forces.

== Timeline ==
February 1996

Major (retd) Dhanapalan, who took premature retirement in 1997, files petition in the High Court of Kerala, challenging his "re-fixation of pay' following the implementation of 4CPC by MoD."

19 December 1997

MoD issues Special Army Instructions (SAI) No. 2/S/1998 (and corresponding special instructions for the Navy and Air Force) on incorporating the impugned formula of 4CPC for re-fixation, recommended by the 5th CPC, which had submitted its report in September 1997.

5 October 1998

Single Judge issued a judgment in favor of Maj Dhanapalan. MoD files Writ Appeal before the High Court’s Division Bench against the order of the Single Judge.

4 July 2003

The Division Bench confirms the judgment of the Single Judge.

2006

MOD agrees to pay Major Dhanapalan his arrears. While conceding that it acted wrongly in the case of Major Dhanapalan, opposes extending the benefits to other similarly affected officers, compelling them, and the many widows, to go to court at their own cost, to seek their dues.

8 March 2010

Supreme Court of India rules in favour of all the Armed Forces officers eligible to be paid Rank Pay. It agrees with "the High Court of Kerala that the amount equivalent to Rank Pay should not have been deducted and the MoD should pay arrears with an interest of 6 percent per annum from 1.1.1986 i.e. the date from which Rank Pay was authorised by the Govt of India. Instead of implementing the Supreme court ruling, MoD files an "Interlocutory Application" praying to the Supreme Court to "recall, re-hear, modify," its order of 8 March 2010, "utilising recommendations of a High Powered Committee (HPC) comprising Pradeep Kumar (IAS), then Defence Secretary, Secretary Defence (Finance), and Secretary Expenditure to impress upon the Court that it would entail an expenditure of Rs 1623.71 crores if the order was implemented as it would lead to re-fixation of emoluments of Armed Forces officers for the periods of 4th, 5th and 6th CPC. What was left unsaid was that it was the faulty interpretation and delays in implementation by MoD that led to the situation".

4 September 2012

A Bench of three Judges of the Supreme Court of India upholds the Court’s order dated 8 March 2010 with the proviso that interest to be paid from 1 January 2006, the date when the first of several writ petitions were filed by affected Armed Forces officers, instead of 1 January 1986, the date on which rank-pay was implemented. The Court also directed the Government to complete payment of arrears and interest within 12 weeks from 4 September 2012.

17 October 2012

Rohinton F Nariman, Solicitor General of India, advises the MOD to implement the Court’s order dated 4 September 2012 in letter and spirit.

27 December 2012

MoD, agrees to pay part of the arrears from 1 January 1986 to 31 December 1995 but objects to paying arrears from 1 January 1996 to 31 December 2005 on the ground that Supreme Court orders lacked clarity for payment and re-fixation from 1 January 2006

== See also ==
- One Rank, One Pension
- One Rank One Pension Scheme
- Sixth Central Pay Commission
- 7th Central Pay Commission (CPC) and Defence Forces
- Defence pensions, India
