= Defence pensions in India =

Defence pensions are pensions paid from the Defence Services Estimates. Approximately 36 percent of amount budgeted for defence pensions is on account of defence civilians. The Defence pension bill for 2015–2016 was ₹ 54,500 crores, including pension outlay for about 400,000 defence civilians, and about Rs1000 Crores on account of allowances and establishment of Ministry of Finance personnel attached to MOD. On an average a defence civilian pensioner cost four times higher than military pensioner. The per capita expenditure on defence civilians is approximately Rs. 5.38 Lakhs annually, in comparison with ₹ 1.38 Lakhs a year for defence pensioners paid from the defence services estimates. The per capita bill on account of defence civilian pensioners is higher mainly because they serve longer, reach the highest grades in the pay scales, are eligible for Non Functional Upgradation, and a host of special increments and promotions]. As of August 2021, SPARSH(Raksha) Pension Administration has been established under DBT(Direct Benefit Transfer) to reduce the Grievances of the Pensioners & to increase transparency Payment to Pensioners.

== Table: Defence pensions ==
No	Year	Defence Pensions in ₹ Crores	Remarks
1	1981 – 82	1,670	
2	2013 – 14	53,582. 15	Defence allocation₹ 2, 24, 000 crore (US$37. 15 billion prevailing average exchange rate). 2013-14 defence budget is exclusive of Rs 53, 582. 15 crore for defence pension, including for defence civilians. It also includes Rs 500 crore on account of the government's One Rank One Pension (OROP).
3	2015 – 16	54,500 Includes Rs22, 500 crore (45%) for civilian pensions	Defence allocation Rs. 2, 46, 727 crore (US$40. 4 billion). The pension allocation includes Rs. 62, 852. 6 crore provided to MoD under the heads of Defence Pensions (Rs. 54, 500 crore) and Civil Expenditure of MoD (Rs. 8, 852. 6 crore), both of which do not form part of India's official defence budget. Total Pensioners 24. 62 lakh, including 5. 62 lakh (22. 83%) defence civilian pensioners.

== Ratio military pensioners to serving personnel ==
The current ratio of military pensioners to serving military personnel is 1.7 to 1. In comparison, the ratio of civil pensioners to civil work force is 0.56 to 1. Reducing the ratio of pensioner to serving in the military will, it is argued, greatly reduce the defence pension bill. To reduce the military pension bill, the 6 CPC and Koshyari Committee, had urged the Government to absorb Armed Forces personnel after their military engagement in Civil Government organization including Police Organization as is the custom in many countries, including in China, and in advanced economies like S Korea, Singapore, Israel, Switzerland, and the United States.

The transfer and absorption of Armed Forces personnel after the end of their military service into government organizations and departments where their unique skills, training, discipline and strengths can be optimally used, despite recommendations of the Parliament and Pay Commission, has been mostly ignored by successive Governments, mainly on account of want bureaucratic commitment in MOD, and sustained obstruction by IPS bureaucrats in MHA.

== Measures to reduce Armed Forces pension bill ==
Lateral move to civil organisations

Fifth Central Pay Commission (5 CPC) The 5 CPC, in its report submitted in January 1997, recommended increase in posts for Armed Forces personnel in Group C and D in Central Armed Police Forces (CAPFs) from 10 percent to 25 percent. For Short Service Commissioned Officers, on completion of their military service, 5 CPC recommended earmarking 25 percent officer's post in the CAPFs. The intent of these recommendations was to reduce the defence pension bill, save on training and recruitment costs, provide trained manpower to government departments, and provide soldiers a second career after their term of military engagement. The Pay Commission recommendations were, however, mostly ignored by the Janata Dal (United Front), and BJP Government of Atal Bihari Vajpayee that followed. Mulayam Singh Yadav, Defence Minister (1 June 1996 – 19 March 1998), Indrajit Gupta (Communist Party of India-United Front), Home Minister (29 June 1996 – 19 March 1998), and L K Advani (BJP), Home Minister (19 March 1998 – 22 May 2004) did little to implement these recommendations. The problem festered, and the pension bill ballooned.

Sixth Central Pay Commission (6 CPC)

The 6 CPC found that Indian Para Military Forces, called Central Armed Police Forces—CAPFs, which has a total strength of about 9,00,000 (2014), and defence civilians in Ministry of Defence, which had a strength of 4,00,000 [2014], have a combined annual intake of around 35,000 personnel; in comparison Armed Forces personnel (Army, Air Force, and Navy) pensioned off every year (in 1996) was approximately 40,000. The 6 CPC on the basis of its analysis concluded that "potential to allow lateral shift of nearly all Defence Forces personnel to CPOs and various cadres of defence civilians exists".

The 6 CPC recommended that in future posts in the "CPOs/defence civilian organisations" should be filled by lateral transfer of Armed Forces personnel, including Short Service Commissioned Officers, after they complete their term of military service. Improving the post military service prospects of Short Service Commissioned Officers finds a prominent place in the BJP manifesto 2014, a pledge on which the BJP has till to act.

The recommendation of 6 CPC on lateral movement, however, were mostly ignored by the Indian National Congress-(UPA) Government. A K Antony, the Defence Minister (24 October 2006 – 26 May 2014), at the time did little to follow up on these recommendations. P Chidambaram, Home Minister (30 November 2008 – 31 July 2012), the minister responsible for implementing the recommendations on lateral movement, according to the 6 CPC, resisted implementing these reforms which would result in savings of tens of thousands of crores. In the Ministry of Home Affairs (MHA) the resistance to these imminently sensible measures was from the civil and police bureaucracy, especially from the heads of Indian Para Military Forces, also called Central Armed Police Forces (CAPFs). The seven CAPFs are headed by officers from Indian Police Service. They have direct access to the Minister of Home Affairs, and were elevated by the UPA Government to apex pay grades, a grade higher than that of most Lt Generals, including those in command of Corps of the Indian Army.

Savings from lateral movement of Armed Forces personnel

The 6 CPC estimated that the "at the end of 13 years the annual savings" from transfer- absorption of Armed Forces personnel to civil departments, including police, "will be to the tune of ₹ 7,800 crore at constant price index". Lateral transfer- absorption, in the longer term result in savings in the overall pension bill, and would more than off set projected expenditure on OROP.

== OROP Scheme ==
The, BJP Government, coming in power in mid 2014, after years of protracted protests by veterans, announced in September 2015 that it would implement One Rank One Pension or OROP. In February 2016, it issued orders to implement the scheme. However, the announced scheme failed to satisfy the leaders of the protest movement.

== See also ==
- One Rank One Pension Scheme
- Rank Pay
- Sixth Central Pay Commission
