= Department of Ex-servicemen Welfare =

Indian government department

Department of Ex-Servicemen Welfare (Poorva Sainik Kalyan Vibhag) is a department in the Ministry of Defence, India. It was set up in 2004. The head of Department of Ex-servicemen Welfare since its inception has been a bureaucrat from the IAS. Veteran have for long demanded that DEWS be headed by a serving officers or a retired officer, like in other countries, including the United States, in which the Department of Veterans, is invariably headed by veteran with active duty military experience, with a cabinet rank. For instance the current head of the department is graduate of West Point, and has served in the army.

But many experts view having a former/serving officer from the uniformed services hazardous to the functioning of DESW as it will further attenuate the efficiency of DEWS. This view is largely shared by veterans(non-officers including ORs and JCOs) who accuse the retired coterie of defense officers only working in the favour of officers. Maj Navdeep Singh, who is renowned lawyer and legal expert in matters relating to defence services and veterans, strongly suggest against having a head of DESW from the uniformed services due to the regimented hierarchy and inter-service or inter-regiment rivalries. Studies have shown that pension benefits for injury/medical issues associated with the service are more often gulped by the senior officers of the armed forces and many genuine beneficiaries, who are mostly retired JCOs or ORs, are left to fend for themselves in bureaucratic silos and courts.

== Functions and Organization ==
The functions of DESW according to the official website are: "Matters relating to Armed Forces Veterans (Ex- Servicemen) including pensioners;Armed Forces Veterans (ExServicemen); Contributory Health Scheme; Matters relating to Directorate General of Resettlement and Kendriya Sainik Board (transl. Central Military Welfare Board); Administration of (a) the Pension Regulations for the Army, 1961 (Parts I and II); (b)the Pension Regulations for the Air Force, 1961 (Parts I and II);(c)the Navy (Pension) Regulations, 1964; and(d) The Entitlement Rules to Casualty Pensionary Awards to the Armed Forces Personnel, 1982".

The department has two Divisions, the Resettlement Division and the Pension Division and 3 attached offices namely (a) Secretariat of Kendriya Sainik Board (KSB) (transl. Secretariat of Central Military Welfare Board), (b) Directorate General (Resettlement) (DGR) and (c) Ex-servicemen Contributory Health Scheme (ECHS) Organisation.

== Veterans in India ==
There are about 2.6 million ex-servicemen, and 60,000 widows, including war widows, i.e., a combined total of 3.2 million, of whom about 86 percent are widows, Junior Commissioned Officers, Non Commissioned Officers, and other ranks, and about 14 percent are officers.

Approximately 60,000 armed forces personnel retire or are released from active service every year. Most are in age bracket of 35 to 45 years. Directorate General Resettlement (DGR) is responsible for preparing retiring/ retired service personnel for a second career. Veterans in India in the last decade have resorted to public protest under the OROP banner to highlight that they are uncared for and treated far worse than civilian counterparts.

== DEWS and Veterans ==
=== DEWS Response to Veteran Issues ===
The Ministry of Defence (MOD), including the DEWS, which is a component of the ministry, is considered by most ex-servicemen, including former head of the Armed Forces, as permanent impediment for the welfare of Ex Serviceman (ESM). Four former heads of the Armed Forces in August 2015, in an open letter addressed to the President of India flagged "The hostile approach of MoD bureaucracy" and its "antagonistic handling of problems related to pensions and allowances of aging veterans, war widows and battle-casualties'.

=== DEWS opposes One Rank One Pension (OROP) ===
The Department of Ex-servicemen Welfare has opposed One Rank One Pension OROP. In 2011, Neelam Nath, Secretary of Department of Ex-Servicemen Welfare from June 1, 2009 to September 30, 2011, in her deposition in front of the Parliamentary Panel that examined the grant of OROP to the Armed Forces, opposed the grant and implementation of OROP for the Armed Forces.

On February 17, 2014, despite protest of DESW, the Government announced in the interim budget acceptance of the principle of ‘One Rank One Pension (OROP), and Ministry of Defence Report 2013-14, noted that "Government has taken steps to implement the OROP from the financial year 2014-15" and that the implementation will improve pensions of past pensioners . Despite the announcement in the MOD Report, OROP was not implemented. The failure to implement OROP by the BJP Government which had in its election manifesto pledged to do so provoked nationwide protest by ex servicemen.

Failure of the BJP Government to implement OROP after several promises provoked Ex-servicemen to undertake unprecedented nationwide protests, and hunger strikes from 15 June 2015. Veteran protest have had the support of former heads of armed Forces. Four former chiefs of the Armed Forces of India, namely General S F Rodrigues, former COAS, and Admirals L Ramdas, Arun Prakash and Sureesh Mehta, former Chiefs of Naval Staff, in an open letter to President Pranab Mukherjee, Supreme Commander of the Armed Forces, on 13 August 2015, warned that the denigration and humiliation of veterans, and the Government handling of veterans and armed Forces issues, pose grave "implication for national security"

== National Commission for Ex-Servicemen ==
Following persistent demand by Ex servicemen, the Government on 9 June 2014 announces that it will set up a National Commission for Ex-Servicemen. However, no funds are earmarked for setting up of the commission during the year 2014–15.

== See also ==
- One Rank, One Pension
- Indian Ex Servicemen Movement
- Koshyari Committee Report On Grant Of One Rank One Pension
