= Dearness allowance =

Cost-of-living Adjustment in India

Dearness Allowance (DA) is a cost-of-living adjustment, an increase made to the basic pay of government officials and public sector workers’ employees. Public sector companies employees are also counted as public sector workers, but not civil servants. Some private sector employees, specially in large legacy companies also receive dearness allowance.

Dearness Allowance is calculated as a percentage of an Indian citizen's basic salary to mitigate the impact of inflation on people. Indian citizens may receive a basic salary or pension that is then supplemented by a housing or a dearness allowance, or both. The guidelines that govern the Dearness Allowance vary according to where one lives. Dearness Allowance is a fully taxable allowance.

The two types of Dearness Allowance are:

- Dearness Allowance given under terms of employment.
- Dearness Allowance not given under the terms of employment.

== History ==
The Dearness Allowance was introduced following the second World War, and was then known as the "Dear Food Allowance". The "Old Textile Allowance" was also introduced in 1947, though this was revised and reintroduced in 1953 as the "Revised Textile Allowance". Initially DA was given in response to demand of employees for wage revision. Later it was linked to Consumer Price Index. In the past various committees have been constituted to look into the issue of payment of DA to Central Government employees.
The 3rd Central Pay Commission recommended payment of DA whenever the CPI rose by 8 points over the index of 200 (with base 1960 = 100). The extent of neutralization granted with effect from 1 January 1973 ranged from 100% to 35%.
The 4th Central Pay Commission recommended the grant of DA on a 'percentage system' of the basic pay (1986). It also recommended payment of DA twice a year; 1 January and 1 July. Each installment of DA was to be calculated with reference to the percentage increase in the 12 monthly average of All India Consumer Price Index (base 1960). The extent of neutralization now ranged from 100% to 65%.
The 5th Central Pay Commission looked into the issue of differential neutralization and found it to be injustice to senior officers and recommended uniform neutralization of 100% to employees at all levels. The Commission had suggested that dearness allowance should be converted into dearness pay every time the cost of living rises by 50% over the base level.
The 6th Central Pay Commission recommended revision of base year of the Consumer Price Index (CPI) as frequently as feasible.It also changed base year for DA calculation to 2001 (base year 2001=100)

== Calculation sheet ==
Formula for calculating Dearness Allowance for Central government employees from 1 January 2006 is :

Dearness Allowance %= {(Average of AICPI(Base year 2001=100) for the past 12 months – 115.77)/115.77}*100

In October 2021, the government revised the Consumer Price Index for Industrial Workers (CPI-IW) base year from 2001 to 2016. A linking factor of 2.88 was defined for converting the new series with the base 2016=100 to the previous series on base 2001=100. Based on this, the DA is currently calculated with the following formula

DA = (A – 261.4)*100/(261.4) Where A = Avg of CPI-IW (base 2016=100) for the past 12 months x linking factor of 2.88

Formula for calculating Dearness Allowance for Central public sector employees from 1 January 2007 is :

Dearness Allowance %= {(Average of AICPI(Base year 2001=100) for the past 3 months - 126.33)/126.33}*100

Dearness allowance with effect from January or July of a particular year in the future, once the AICPI(IW) for a particular month is published by the Government, whereas for PSU employees it is declared quarterly by DPE (Department of Public Enterprise).

Beginning 1 January 1996, the Dearness Allowance is granted to compensate for price increases to which the revised pay scales relate. This will be reviewed twice a year, on 1 January and 1 July.

The following table shows All India Consumer Price Index since 1 January 2006 with Base year 2001=100

Year	Jan	Feb	March	April	May	June	July	Aug	Sept	Oct	Nov	Dec	Average
2006	119	119	119	120	121	123	124	124	125	127	127	127	123
2007	127	128	127	128	129	130	132	133	133	134	134	134	131
2008	134	135	137	138	139	140	143	145	146	148	148	147	141.66
2009	148	148	148	150	151	153	160	162	163	165	168	169	157
2010	172	170	170	170	172	174	178	178	179	181	182	185	175.9
2011	188	185	185	186	187	189	193	194	197	198	199	197	191.5
2012	198	199	201	205	206	208	212	214	215	217	218	219	209.33
2013	221	223	224	226	228	231	235	237	238	241	243	239	232.16
2014	237	238	239	242	244	246	252	253	253	253	253	253	246.91
2015	254	253	254	256	258	261	263	264	266	269	270	269	261.42
2016	269	267	268	271	275	277	280	278	277	278	277	275	274.33
2017	274	274	275	277	278	280	285	285	285	287	288	286	281.167
2018	288	287	287	288	289	291	301	301	301	302	302	301	294.33
2019		307			314			320	322	325	328		

The DA Rate for Industrial Workers (since 1 January 2007 with Base year 2001=100) for 3rd Quarter (Oct-Dec), 2015 has been declared as 107.9% and that of 4th Quarter (Jan-Mar), 2016 is 112.40%.

The 5th Pay Commission recommendations were implemented since 1 January 1996 and consequently DA rate with effective from 1 January 1996 became 0. Further in 1994 Central Government merged 50% of the Dearness Allowance (DA) with the basic pay with effective from 1 April 2004 and the Dearness Allowance continued to be calculated with reference to the All IndiaConsumer Price Index for Industrial Workers (AICPI-IW) average as on 1 January 1996 of 306.33 without changing the index base consequent to the merger. Accordingly, Dearness Allowance (DA) as mentioned in table below were sanctioned from 1 July 2004 till 1 July 2007.

Year	1996	1996	1997	1997	1998	1998	1999	1999	2000	2000	2001	2001	2002	2002	2003	2003	2004	2004	2005	2005	2006	2006	2007	2007
Month	Jan	July	Jan	July	Jan	July	Jan	July	Jan	July	Jan	July	Jan	July	Jan	July	Jan	July	Jan	July	Jan	July	Jan	July
DA %	0	4	8	13	16	22	32	37	38	41	43	45	49	52	55	59	61	64	67	71	74	79	85	91
DA% after 50% merger in 1.3.2004	-	-	-	-	-	-	-	-	-	-	-	-	-	-	-	-	-	14	17	21	24	29	35	41

DA rate as applicable after implementation of 6th Pay Commission recommendations with effective from 1 January 2006 is shown in table below :-

Year	2006	2006	'07	'07	'08	'08	'09	'09	2010	2010	'11	'11	'12	'12	'13	'13	'14	'14	'15	'15	'16	'16	'17	'17	'18	'18	'19	'19
Month	Jan	July	Jan	Jul	Jan	Jul	Jan	Jul	Jan	Jul	Jan	Jul	Jan	Jul	Jan	Jul	Jan	Jul	Jan	Jul	Jan	Jul	Jan	Jul	Jan	Jul	Jan	Jul
DA %	0	2	6	9	12	16	22	27	35	45	51	58	65	72	80	90	100	107	113	119	125	132	136	139	142	148	154	164

DA rate as applicable after implementation of 7th Pay Commission recommendations with effective from 1 January 2016 is shown in table below :-

Print media workers

For print media workers the Government of India has notified a DA Formula in the Gazette No 2532(E) of 11 November 2011, as recommended by the Majithia Wage Board for Journalists and Non-Journalists. The said Gazette notified formula was subsequently upheld by the Supreme Court of India by its judgment made on 7 February 2014. The Supreme Court of India upheld the recommendations as 'revised and determined' by Justice (retd) Majithia. While 115.76 is the Base and Divisor for Central Government staff, for employees coming under Majithia Wage Board 167 had been recommended as Base and Divisor. The said 167 is the 12-month average of 1 July 2009 to 30 June 2010.

The average for the current DA period January to December 2017 is 274, which is the 12-month average AICPI-IW of 1 January 2016 to 31 December 2016. The DA calculation for Jan 2017 to June 2017 is 274 minus 167 * Basic Pay and the result divided by 167. Total points 107.

== 7th Pay Commission ==
Dearness allowance rate applicable after implementation of 7th Pay Commission recommendations with effective from 1 January 2016 as shown in table below. Accordingly the Nodal Authority Department of Expenditure, Ministry of Finance has issued the Office Memoranda as cited below:-

Year	2016	2016	2017	2017	2018	2018	2019	2019	2020	2020	2021	2021	2022	2022	2023	2023	2024	2024	2025	2025	2026	2026
Month	Jan	July	Jan	July	Jan	July	Jan	July	Jan	July	Jan	July	Jan	July	Jan	July	Jan	July	Jan	July	Jan	July
DA %	0	2	4	5	7	9	12	17	17	17	17	28 31	34	38	42	46	50	53	55	58	60	63

== Pensioners ==
Both pensioners and their families are granted DA and this continues following reemployment with the Government of India or State Governments, a public sector undertaking, autonomous bodies or a local body; that is, DA is allowed in addition to a recipient's fixed pay or "time scale". In other cases of reemployment, access to DA is subject to the limit of emoluments last drawn.

DA is not allowed during a pensioner's time overseas if employment is undertaken. It remains accessible to overseas pensioners whilst the recipient is not employed.

Since 1 October 1984, pensioners are paid DA at a certain percentage of basic pension. This is calculated on the original pension without commutation. Since 1 July 1986 the percentage has been revised every six months based on the cost of living index.
