= Sixth Central Pay Commission =

2006–08 Indian government agency

Agency overview
- Formed: 5 October 2006
- Dissolved: 24 March 2008
- Jurisdiction: Government of India
- Headquarters: New Delhi
- Agency executives: B. N. Srikrishna, Chairman; Prof. Ravindra Dholakia, Member; J. S. Mathur, Member; Sushama Nath, Member-Secretary
- Parent agency: Ministry of Finance, Government of India
- Website: http://finmin.nic.in/6cpc/index.asp

The Sixth Central Pay Commission was convened by the Union Cabinet of India on 5 October 2006. The Pay Commission was headed by B. N. Srikrishna. The other members of the Commission were Ravindra Dholakia, J. S. Mathur, and Member-Secretary Sushama Nath.

The Sixth Central Pay Commission submitted its report to the Finance Minister, P. Chidambaram on 24 March 2008. On 29 August 2008, the government announced its decision to implement the report on "structure of emoluments, allowances, conditions of service and retirement benefits of Central Government employees including ... the Defence Forces", "subject to some modifications".

The Sixth Central Pay Commission, unlike the earlier Central Pay Commissions, was given a wide remit. It included making recommendations to rationalize the governmental organization and structure to make them more "modern, professional and citizen friendly entities that are dedicated to the service of the people".

== Report ==
On 14 August 2008, the United Progressive Alliance (UPA) government, headed by Manmohan Singh, approved the Sixth Central Pay Commission recommendations with some modifications. Back pay was given from 1 January 2006 and allowances with effect from 1 September 2008. The report led to a six percent increase in the cost of living allowance for central government employees from 16 percent to 22 percent.

The Sixth Central Pay Commission estimated that the financial implication of its recommendations would be "Rs.7975 crore for the year 2008 – 2009, and an additional, one time burden of Rs.18060 crore on payment of arrears".

== Ranks ==
The Sixth Central Pay Commission created twenty distinct ranks (pay grades) in the Government hierarchy. It was intended that an employee's status and seniority of post would be determined. The pay grades were intended to make "pay scales ... irrelevant for purposes of computing seniority". The highest ranks such as the Secretary, and the Cabinet Secretary (or equivalent), were placed on an "Apex Scale" outside the grades with a fixed scale of pay.

The Sixth Central Pay Commission recommended four running pay bands (excluding -1S). They would contain twenty grades. The commission explained that the pay band would ease stagnation by opening "promotional avenues ... even though no functional justification for higher posts may exist"; ease problems of "pay fixation"; and remove "many of the pay scale related anomalies".

Another recommendation was the creation of an "additional separate running pay band ... the scale of Rs.18400 – 22400 in higher administrative grades".

== Anomalies ==
The Sixth Central Pay Commission report contained anomalies which were examined by an "Anomalies Committee". The committee looked at "individual, post-specific and cadre-specific anomalies". Anomalies concerning the Armed Forces members were not addressed and the "One Rank One Pension" (OROP) was not implemented leading to public anger with the commission and the government.

In November 2015, Satbir Singh, chairman of the Indian Ex Servicemen Movement (IESM), said there were forty anomalies yet to be addressed.

== Running pay bands and the armed forces ==
The Sixth Central Pay Commission recommended four selection grade military ranks be linked. Lieutenant Colonel would be linked to Major General as would their equivalents in the navy and air force. This would be similar to civilian ranks based on time served between four and sixteen years. Major generals, rear admirals, and air marshals (a highly selective rank) were made at par with civilian employees with sixteen years of service. The government accepted this recommendation.

Some members of the armed forces and veterans disagreed with the change.

== Time scale civil police promotions ==
Following the Sixth Central Pay Commission, the UPA Government made promotions in the Indian Police Service and other civil services dependent on time served. In 2007, Indian Police Service officers were promoted on a fixed time table, independent of functional requirements or span of responsibility, up to the level of Inspector General. Promotions were mandated on completion of 4, 9, 13, 14, and 18 years of service. Most Inspector General functions and responsibilities were no different from that of earlier era Deputy Inspector Generals and Superintendents of Police.

Civilian designation of post	Police Ranks	Years of service for promotion	Pay band	Grade Pay ₹	Police badges of rank.
Junior Scale	Assistant Commissioner of Police	1-4	Pay-Band - 3 ₹15600-39100	₹5400	Corresponds to army Lieutenant or Captain.
Senior Scale (Under Secretary)	Superintendent Police (SP) / Additional Deputy Commissioner of Police	4	Pay-Band - 3 ₹15600-39100	₹6600	Time scale corresponds to army captains. Wear army Major badges of rank.
Senior Scale: Junior Administrative Grade (Deputy Secretary)	SP/ Deputy Commissioner of Police	9	Pay band - 3: ₹15600-39100	₹7600	7600 grade pay created an anomaly. Army Majors, and their equivalents with 9 years and more service, remained in 6600 grade pay till 13 years of service, while officers from all other services in the time scale jumped to 7600 grade pay after 9 years including in the defence accounts, and the Indian Police. The IPS, which wears army style badges, instead of wearing equivalent badges of rank, started to wear Lt Colonel badges of rank.
Senior Scale: Selection Grade (Director)	SP/ Senior SP	13	Pay-Band - 4 ₹37400-67000	₹8700	8700 grade pay also created an anomaly. Army Lt Colonels, and their equivalent with 13 years and more service, remained at RS 8000 grade pay till they were promoted to Colonel, a highly selective selection grade rank, tenable after 16 – 18 years of service. In comparison, all officers from the civil services jumped to 8700 grade pay, a time scale position, after 13 years including in defence accounts, and the Indian Police. The IPS, with army style badges, instead of wearing Major or Lt Colonel type badges of rank as they use to, started to wear Colonel type badges of rank.
Super Time Scale (Director)	Deputy Inspector General of Police (DIG)/Additional Commissioner of Police	14	Pay-Band - 4 ₹37400-67000	₹ 8900	Time scale, on completion of 14 years service of service all Police Officers wear army Brigadier badges of rank, and receive the same grade pay as Brigade Commanders, Air commodores, and Navy Commodores, with 24 – 28 years of service.
Super Time Scale (Joint Secretary)	Inspector General of Police	16 for IAS – 18 for IPS	Pay-Band - 4 ₹37400-67000	₹10000	Time scale, all police officers on completion of 18 years wear Major General's badges of rank, and receive same grade pay as General Officers commanding Infantry and Armoured Divisions, who on an average have 32 years of service. In comparison with 100 percent promotion to this rank in police, army, airforce and navy, have an approval rating of about 2 percent, to the rank of Major General, Rear Admiral, and Air Vice Marshals.
Above super Time scale (Additional Secretary)	Additional Director General of Police [This is a new police rank created after the 3 CPC]	25	₹67000(annual increment @3%) -79000	-	All IAS/IPS assured promotion to this level because of significant increase in post at this and above this level. Additional Director General of Police (ADGP) wear Lieutenant General badges of rank, and are in same pay grade as corps commanders. Less than 0.13 percent of officers in the army, air force and navy promoted as Lt. Generals.
Above Super Time Scale : HAG plus (Special Secretary)	Additional/Special Director General of Police [This also is a new police rank created after the 4 CPC]	26-30	₹75500- (annual increment@ 3%)-80000	nil	Significant number of IAS / IPS officers are promoted to Special DG especially after the large upwards gradation of police ranks. They wear Lieutenant Generals badges of rank.
Secretary/ special secretary	Director General of Police (A new police rank: initially there were few, now there are scores)	30	₹80000 (fixed)	nil	Age permitting, most IPS officers expect to reach the DG / equivalent pay grade, (apex grade). DGs wear Lieutenant General badges of rank, and are in same pay grade as Army Corps commanders. Following the UPA Governments creation of approximately 30 new post for police officers in the apex grade, in 2008, most police officers retire at the highest pension.

=== Up graduation of heads of Central and State Police Forces ===
Following the Sixth Central Pay Commission report, the UPA Government, in recognition of the growing role and influence of the Ministry of Home (MHA), India's Interior Ministry, promoted the heads of the five police led Central Para Military Forces to the highest pay grade, or the Apex Scale, with a fixed pay of Rs. 80,000. The promotions to the Apex Scale included not only the heads of the bigger forces like the Central Reserve Police Force (CRPF), and Border Security Force (BSF), but also the smaller MHA Forces, like the Indo-Tibetan Border Police (ITBP), Central Industrial Security Force (CISF) (CISF) and Sashastra Seema Bal (SSB). In addition to these promotions, the government also promoted the Director General of the Railway Police, and the Director General of Police of States to the Apex Scale. This made the Director Generals of these central and state forces at par in rank, pay, and status with Secretaries to the Government of India, Armed Forces senior most Lieutenant Generals, Air Marshals, and Vice Admirals.

=== Non functional promotions ===
After the Sixth Central Pay Commission, the government implemented "Non Functional" ranks. Avay Shukla, who retired in 2010, said, "Whenever any Indian Administrative Service officer ... in pay band 3 or pay band 4, is promoted, members of the Indian Police service and other All India Services (AIS), senior to such officers will be automatically be eligible to be appointed to the same grade on non-functional basis from the date of posting of the Indian Administrative Service officer in that particular grade".

== See also ==
- Pay Commission
- One Rank, One Pension
- Defence pensions, India
- 7th Central Pay Commission (CPC) and Defence Forces
