= Indian Ex Servicemen Movement =

Indian military advocacy organisation

- Abbreviation: IESM
- Formation: August 2008
- Founder: Lt Colonel Inderjit Singh, former Commanding Officer 14 Grenadiers
- Type: Military veterans organization
- Headquarters: Gurgaon, Haryana, India
- Region served: India
- Members: 20455 (Veterans of the Army, Airforce, Navy, and civilians supporters of veteran causes)
- Chairman: Major General Satbir Singh, (Retired), Indian army
- Vice Chairman: Maj Gen PK Renjen, AVSM,
- Staff: Executive Committee
- Website: www.iesm.org

Indian Ex Servicemen Movement (IESM) is a "All India Federation of Ex Servicemen's organizations" and individual veterans of the Indian Army, Navy and Air Force. IESM was established in August 2008, in the wake of the UPA Government decision to implement Sixth Central Pay Commission, which depressed military pays and pensions, and ranks, relative to civilian Government employees, especially in the Ministry of Defence and Police led security services. The IESM has been at the forefront in identifying, and advocating veteran causes, principally issues affecting veteran honor and izzat, and the implementation of One Rank One pension for the armed forces of India. Its founder member is Lt Colonel Inderjit Singh, former Commanding Officer 14 Grenadiers, who retired from the army in 1978.

== Goals ==
The stated aims of the IESM are: to serve as an umbrella organization for all Ex Servicemen of India; provide a unified veteran voice on issues of national interest; serve as a forum for raising and discussing challenges faced by veterans; play 'constructive role in nation building activities; promote and support IESM causes, including those affecting ESM Widows, war wounded, and injured; and render assistance and advice to veterans on matters of pension, health coverage and benefits, and legal issues.

== Organisation ==
=== Governing Body (GB) ===
IESM has a federal structure with units at national, state and district levels. The highest decision making body is called the governing body, for which elections are held every three years. The last election were held on 16 November 2014 in Pune, Maharashtra. The Election were conducted by election unit headed by Brig HSN Sastri. Soon after the election of the Governing body, it elected an ecommittee for the day-to-day running of the organisation. The current composition of the GB is as follows:

Name and designation	District, City	State	Remarks
Maj Gen Satbir Singh	Gurgaon	Haryana	
Gp Capt VK Gandhi	Noida	UP	
Commander SS Ahuja, IN	Noida	UP	
Wg Cdr CK Sharma	Delhi	Delhi	
Cdr Ravi Pathak	Pune	Maharashtra	
Col Pronoy Sengupta	Pune	Maharashtra	
Maj Gen PK Renjen	Gurgaon	Haryana	
Col Anil Koul	Gurgaon	Haryana	
Brig CS Vidyasagar / COP (Indian Navy) Miryala Guru Swamy Naidu	Secunderabad	Andhra Pradesh	
Maj Gen AJB Jaini	Ghaziabad	UP	
Hony Lt Kameshwar Pandey		Bihar	
Col Kirit Joshipura		Gujarat	
Hony Capt Jai Singh Rathee	Jhajjhar	Haryana	
Sub Maj Markandey Singh	Ghazipur	UP	
Hav Dina Nath	Varanasi	UP	
Col RP Chaturvedi	Noida	UP	
Mrs Anuradha Deo w/o Maj SM Deo	Nagpur	Maharashra	
Sgt Prakash Narain Pandey	Kanpur	UP	
Brig Harwant Singh	Mohali	Punjab	
Col Vijay Gaekwad	Kolhapur	Maharashtra	

=== Executive committee ===
No	Rank and name	appointment	remarks
1	Maj Gen Satbir Singh, SM	Offg Chairman	
2	Maj Gen PK Renjen, AVSM	Vice Chairman	
3	Wg Cdr CK Sharma	Treasurer	
4	Gp Capt VK Gandhi VSM	General Secretary	Flat no 801, Tower N5 Narmada Apartments Pocket D6 Vasant Kunj Nelson Mandela Marg New Delhi.
5	Brig CS Vidyasagar	Joint General Secretary	

=== Divisions ===
Indian Ex Servicemen Movement to render assistance to veterans, and its members, is organised into three units. These are the Pension Division, Ex-servicemen Contributory Health scheme, and Legal Division, which includes Veterans Anil Bakhshi, Col Ramath, and Maj Navdeep Singh

=== Membership ===
IESM has a full-time member ship of 20455, including army 15820, airforce 3032, navy 1527, and civilians 52. Its active members belong to all Indian states including Delhi, Haryana, Rajasthan, Uttar Pradesh, Karnataka, Punjab, Himachal Pradesh, Maharashtra, Jammu and Kashmir, Kerala, Chandigarh, Mizoram, Chennai, Tamil Nadu, Odisha. The headquarters of IESM is located at 543, Sector 23, Gurgaon, Haryana, Pin 122017. Vice President of Committee Southern Region Andhra Pradesh and Tamilnadu Shri Miryala Guru Swamy Naidu Senior Officer Sena welfare committee and board advisor rural defence development.

=== Funding ===
IESM operates with a limited budget, and members of the governing body serve on a pro bono basis. For its operating expenses it is dependent on membership fees, and donations. The year after it was formed, for the period 1 April-30 Nov, 2009, its total receipts from Membership Fee (5,72,100.00) and Donations (Rs 4,23,869.00) was Rs 9,95,969.00. In addition it had Fixed Deposits of Rs 19,00,000.00.

== Advocacy of OROP ==
In June 2015, IESM, as major component of the umbrella organization United Front of Ex-Servicemen (UFESM), participated in nationwide protests, spread over 80 towns and cities of India, demanding implementation of OROP. On 5 September 2015, after 84 days of protest, which included relay hunger strikes and 24 days fast to death, by the IESM members and their supporters, the government announced unilaterally, a scheme which it called OROP, which IESM dismissed, saying it was not OROP, but "One Rank, Five Pensions".

IESM advocacy of OROP and other ESM causes has wide popular support. 14 Former Chief of Indian Defence Forces have endorsed its stand on OROP. Shekhar Gupta, editor Indian Express, in September 2015, criticized IESM for resorting to public protest and dharnas. He called the ex servicemen's protest an unedifying spectacle.

On 15 June 2015 in New Delhi (India):Angry over the delay in implementation of 'One Rank One Pension', ex-servicemen on Sunday launched a protest at Jantar Mantar. Signing a petition with blood they prepared to return gallantry medals to the president. Ex-servicemen was gone on an indefinite relay hunger strike to put pressure on the government to implement One-Rank, One-Pension (OROP) scheme. The hunger strike was led by Lt Colonel MBS Ahluwalia (retd) and many others joined while hundreds were set to participate in the protest. Day before 15 June, the retired servicemen took out a massive rally in the national capital and across the country to express their displeasure in the delay of OROP implementation.

== Returning of medals ==
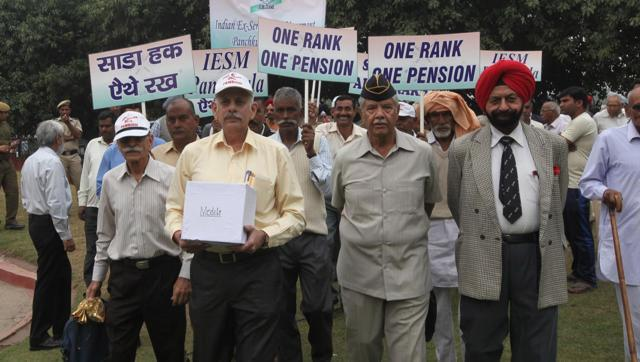
The veterans, under the banner of Indian Ex-Servicemen Movement (IESM), gathered at Shankla Chowk in Sector 2 and marched to the deputy commissioner's office to submit their medals, to be further sent to Prime Minister (PM) Narendra Modi.

Military veterans returned their war and other medals at various places in Haryana and Punjab on Tuesday to register their protest against the "diluted" notification of the One Rank One Pension scheme. In Panchkula near Chandigarh, the veterans along with the founder of Hunger Strike Lt Colonel MBS Ahluwalia (retd) returned their medals to the Panchkula deputy commissioner to protest against the OROP notification issued by the central government. There were reports of veterans returning their medals in Jalandhar, Amritsar, Patiala in Punjab and Rohtak, Hisar and Ambala in Haryana. The veterans said that they had rejected the OROP notified by the Narendra Modi government. The defence veterans said that they will observe a ‘Black Diwali’ this time to protest against the Modi government going back on its assurances.

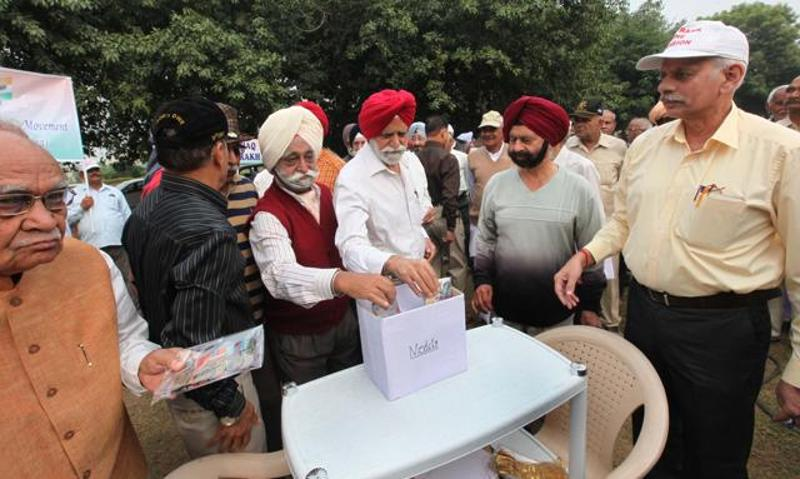
"Unfortunately, the recently issued notification on the OROP gives nothing but a truncated deal and cannot be called OROP either in letter or spirit," the memorandum to the PM read. (HT Photo)

== See also ==
- One Rank, One Pension
- Koshyari Committee Report On Grant Of One Rank One Pension
- Sixth Central Pay Commission
- Department of Ex-servicemen Welfare
