= Kamarajapuram =

Indian village in Tamil Nadu

Coordinates: 13.053553°N 80.23945°E

Kamarajapuram (Tamil: காமராஜபுரம்) is a small and popular area of Nagercoil, near Vadeserry Bustand, Kanyakumari District in Tamil Nadu, India. Its post code is 629 001.

The name "Kamarajapuram" is derived from The Honorable Former Chief Minister Mr. K. Kamraj. Kamarajapuram C.S.I. Pastorate Church serves the area. Christ Primary School under the supervision of C.S.I. Kanyakumari Diocese provides education to the people and surroundings.
