= Central Pay Commission =

Indian government commission

The Central Pay Commission is a committee constituted by the Government of India decennially, responsible for tabling recommendations regarding changes in the salary structure of federal employees, both civilian and defence. Established in 1946, seven pay commissions have been set up each decade since India's independence to review and provide recommendations on the work and pay structure of all the civil and military divisions comprising the Government of India. Headquartered in New Delhi, the commission is tasked with making its recommendations within 18 months from the date of its constitution. In January 2025, the formation of the Eighth Pay Commission received approval from the Union Cabinet.

== First Pay Commission ==
The first pay commission, established in January 1946, submitted its report in May 1947 to the Interim Government of India. It was under the chairmanship of Srinivasa Varadachariar and comprised nine members. The mandate of the First Pay Commission was to examine and recommend emolument structure of the government's civilian employees.

=== Post War Pay Committee for the Indian Armed Forces ===
The emoluments structure of the Indian Armed Forces was determined not by the First Central Pay Commission but by a Departmental Committee consisting of service members. The task of this committee was to make recommendations "in the structure of emoluments and benefits of service personnel in the light of the recommendations made by the pay commission for civilian employees". The First Pay Committee, set up after the First Pay Commission, was called The Post War Pay Committee for the Armed Forces. The New Pay Code—effective from 1 July 1947—was based on the recommendations of this committee. The pensionary benefits were examined by a separate committee called the Armed Forces Pension Revision Committee (1949–50).

== Second Pay Commission ==
The Second Pay Commission was set up in August 1957, 10 years after India's independence; it furnished its report after two years. The recommendations of the Second Pay Commission had a financial impact of ₹39.6 crores. The chairman of the Second Pay Commission was Jagannath Das.

=== Raghuramiah Committee ===
The Departmental Pay Committee, set up after the Second Pay Commission, was called, the Raghuramiah Committee (1960), which had representation from the armed forces too. It examined the emoluments of the armed forces and provided the necessary recommendations.

== Third Pay Commission ==
The Third Pay Commission was constituted in April 1970 and presented its findings in March 1973. The Commission was chaired by Raghubar Dayal, a former justice of the Supreme Court of India, with Niharranjan Ray, A.K. Das Gupta, and V.R. Pillai as its members.

== Fourth Pay Commission ==
Constituted in June 1983, its report was presented in three phases within four years and the financial burden to the government totalled ₹1282 crore. The chairman of the Fourth Pay Commission was P.N. Singhal, a former judge of the Supreme Court of India.

=== Fourth Pay Commission and the Armed Forces ===
The Congress (I) government, led by Rajiv Gandhi, introduced the concept of Rank Pay for armed forces officers following the recommendations of the Fourth Pay Commission. The Rank Pay, which ranged from ₹200 to ₹1,200, applied to officers from the rank of Second Lieutenant to Brigadier in the Indian Army, and equivalent ranks in the Indian Air Force and Indian Navy. Unlike an additional allowance, the Rank Pay was deducted from the officer's pay grade. This adjustment disrupted the established pay parity between military and police services. Police officers and officers from other All India Services with 14 years of service, who were previously in the same pay grade as Majors, were reclassified to Brigadier-equivalent grades under the new pay structure.

== Fifth Pay Commission ==
The notification for the establishment of the Fifth Pay Commission was issued on 9 April 1994, but it became operational only on 2 May 1994, with the assumption of charge by the Member Secretary. The Chairman of the Fifth Pay Commission was S. Ratnavel Pandian, a former justice of the Supreme Court of India. The Commission's members included Suresh Tendulkar, a professor at the Delhi School of Economics, and M.K. Kaw, an officer of the Indian Administrative Service. The Fifth Pay Commission consisted of three members, with no military representation. The First Pay Commission had a secretary but no member secretary. Since the First Pay Commission, all subsequent pay commissions have had a member secretary, typically selected from the Indian Administrative Service. The final report of the Fifth Pay Commission was submitted for consideration before the Government of India in April 1997.

The Fifth Pay Commission report, spanning a massive tome, had nine parts in 172 chapters. Composition of the report took three years with a staff of 107, which eventually ballooned to 141. On the contrary, the Fourth Pay Commission involved the participation of 209 officials from various bureaucratic services, including the Indian Accounts Service, Indian Revenue Service, Indian Economic Service, Central Secretariat Service, Border Security Force, Geological Survey of India, Central Public Works Department, and the National Informatics Centre. The financial implications stemming from accepting the recommendations of the Fifth Pay Commission amounted to ₹17,000 crores.

=== Other recommendations ===
One of its recommendations was to slash government workforce by about 30%. It also recommended the reduction of the number of pay scales from 51 to 34 and to not initiate recruitment of personnel for around 350,000 vacant positions in the Central Government. None of these recommendations were implemented.

=== Fifth Pay Commission and the Armed Forces ===
In its report submitted in January 1997, the Fifth Pay Commission recommended increasing the proportion of Armed Forces personnel in Group C and D posts within the Central Armed Police Forces (CAPFs) from 10% to 25%. For Short Service Commissioned Officers, the Commission also suggested reserving 25% of officer posts in the CAPFs upon completion of their military service. These recommendations aimed to reduce the defence pension bill, cut training and recruitment costs, provide trained manpower to government departments, and offer soldiers a second career after their military service.

However, the foregoing recommendations of the Fifth Pay Commission were largely ignored by the subsequent Janata Dal (United Front) and BJP government led by Atal Bihari Vajpayee. As a result, the issue remained unresolved, and the defence pension bill ballooned.

== Sixth Pay Commission ==
In July 2006, the Cabinet approved the constitution of the Sixth Pay Commission. This commission—helmed by B.N. Srikrishna—was granted 18 months to table its recommendations. Journalistic reports had speculated that the additional cost of salary hikes under the Sixth Pay Commission would be around ₹20,000 crore for 5.5 million government employees. The Commission tabled its findings and recommendations in March 2008, which were subsequently approved by the Union Cabinet in August 2008.

Federal employees had threatened to go on a nationwide strike if the government failed to increase their salaries. The demand for hikes was driven by factors such as rising inflation and the growing wages in the private sector due to the forces of globalisation. Class 1 officers, particularly those in the Indian Administrative Service, were seen as grossly underpaid, with an administrative service officer amassing 25 years of experience earning only ₹55,000 as take-home pay. Pay arrears had been due from January 2006 to September 2008.

In 2008, nearly all government employees received 40% of the pay arrears, and the remaining 60%, as promised by the government, was credited to their accounts in 2009. The Sixth Pay Commission primarily aimed to eliminate ambiguities regarding various pay scales and focused on consolidating them into pay bands. It also recommended the abolition of the Group-D cadre.

== Seventh Pay Commission ==
On 25 September 2013, the Government of India approved the constitution of the Seventh Pay Commission. Its recommendations were expected to be implemented with effect from 1 January 2016. A.K Mathur—a former justice of the Supreme Court of India—spearheaded the Seventh Pay Commission.

On 19 November 2015, the 7th Central Pay Commission recommended a 23.55% increase in pay and allowances, effective from 1 January 2016. On 29 June 2016, the Union Cabinet approved the Seventh Pay Commission’s recommendations, which were to be implemented from 1 January 2016. This, however, entailed a meagre 14% increase in salary after six months of intense evaluation and deliberation. Unlike previous pay commissions, the arrears were to be paid within the same financial year (2016–17). This was a significant departure from earlier practices, where arrears were paid in the following financial year. Additionally, employees had to wait only six months for the implementation of the Seventh Pay Commission recommendations, compared to 19 months for the Fifth Pay Commission and 32 months for the Sixth Pay Commission. However, the new pay structure did not apply to autonomous organisations such as CSIR, ICAR, and ICMR, which are under various ministries.

In 2017, the maximum amount that a Central Government employee could borrow for the construction or purchase of a new house or apartment unit increased to ₹25 lakh, up from the previous limit of ₹7.50 lakh. Employees can borrow up to 34 months of their basic pay, with a cap of ₹25 lakh, the cost of the house or flat, or an amount based on their repayment capacity—whichever is the lowest. If both spouses are central government employees, they can apply for the Housing Building Advance (HBA) either jointly or separately. Additionally, the interest rate on the HBA will be set at a simple interest rate of 8.50%.

=== Composition ===
Name	Designation	Role in Commission
Ashok Kumar Mathur	Former judge of the Supreme Court of India and former chairman of the Armed Forces Tribunal	Chairman
Vivek Rae	Retired Secretary of the Ministry of Petroleum and Natural Gas	Member (Full Time)
Dr. Rathin Roy	Director of the NIPFP	Member (Part Time)
Meena Agarwal	Officer on Special Duty at the Department of Expenditure, Ministry of Finance	Secretary

In May 2014, a group of retired government officials challenged the inclusion of a senior IAS officer in the three-member Seventh Pay Commission in the Delhi High Court. They argued that this could result in an inherent bias in the commission's recommendations, favouring IAS officers over other government employees.

=== Seventh Pay Commission and the Armed Forces ===
The Seventh Pay Commission's recommendations caused concerns in the Armed Forces, particularly regarding the separate pay scales and allowances for the Armed Forces, Defence civilians, police, and other civil servants. While the Seventh Pay Commission provides for time-scale promotions at regular intervals (4, 9, 13, 14, and 16 years of service) for defence civilians, police officers, and others, no such provision exists for Armed Forces officers.

In March 2016, eighteen former heads of the Armed Forces, including General Ved Prakash Malik (former Chief of Army Staff) and Admiral Arun Prakash (former Chief of Naval Staff), sent a joint letter to the Prime Minister, expressing their concerns over the recommendations of the Seventh Pay Commission. However, the government issued instructions in July 2016, implementing the Seventh Pay Commission's recommendations on pay, including separate pay matrices for civilians and the Armed Forces, without any significant changes.

== Eighth Pay Commission ==
On 16 January 2025, the Minister of Railways Ashwini Vaishnav announced the constitution of the Eighth Pay Commission. During the Monsoon Session of Parliament held on 21 July 2025, the Minister of State for Finance, while replying to a question related to the Eighth Pay Commission, stated that inputs have been sought from major stakeholders, including the Ministry of Defence, Ministry of Home Affairs, Department of Personnel & Training and from the states of India. He claimed that the chairperson and members of the Eighth Pay Commission would be appointed once the Commission is notified by the Government.

On 29 July 2025, Sagarika Ghose, the Member of Parliament from West Bengal, enquired about the status of the Eighth Pay Commission in the Rajya Sabha. Pankaj Chaudhary, in his capacity as the Minister of State for Finance, responded that while the government has decided to constitute the Commission, the official notification has not been issued yet. The exact timeline for recommendations will only be known after the Terms of Reference are finalised.

Nearly ten months after the Eighth Pay Commission was approved, the government was yet to issue the official gazette notification, prompting growing frustration among central government employees. The prolonged silence has drawn sharp criticism, especially from the Railway Employees’ Union (AIRF), which announced a nationwide protest on 19 September 2025.

Following almost ten months of delay and deviation from norms, the Union Government finally announced the approval of the Terms of Reference for the Eighth Pay Commission on October 28, 2025. The Commission is expected to submit its report on the Eighth Pay Commission within 18 months of its constitution.

It launched its official website at 8cpc.gov.in, developed and hosted by the National Informatics Centre, which serves as the central hub for official notifications, consultation documents, and memorandum submissions.

Following the website launch, the Commission released an 18-question structured questionnaire on the MyGov portal, inviting feedback from central government employees, pensioners, defence personnel, judicial officers, and the general public on matters including pay structure, allowances, and service conditions. The deadline for the MyGov questionnaire was 16 March 2026, and only online submissions were accepted; paper-based responses and emails were not considered.

Subsequently, the Commission opened a separate online portal for formal memorandum submissions from employee associations, unions, and individual stakeholders, with a deadline of 30 April 2026. The Commission also invited applications for consultants on a contract basis in the fields of finance, human resources, and law to assist in its analytical work.

As part of its nationwide stakeholder consultation process, the Commission issued official notices scheduling interaction meetings across multiple cities. A visit to Dehradun, Uttarakhand was held on 24 April 2026, followed by interaction meetings in New Delhi on 28, 29, and 30 April 2026, and a visit to Pune, Maharashtra on 4 and 5 May 2026, with further meetings planned in Mumbai and other states.

In April 2026, the Staff Side of the National Council–Joint Consultative Machinery (NC-JCM), the apex body representing central government employees, submitted a 51-page memorandum to the Commission. The memorandum proposed a fitment factor of 3.833, which would raise the minimum basic pay from ₹18,000 under the Seventh Pay Commission to ₹69,000, an annual increment of 6 per cent, House Rent Allowance revision to 40, 35, and 30 per cent for X, Y, and Z category cities respectively, and restoration of the Old Pension Scheme at 67 per cent of the last drawn pay, among other demands.

The commission was constituted on 3 November 2025. It is expected to submit its report by May 2027, and the government has indicated the recommendations would normally take effect from 1 January 2026, though revised pay is likely to reach employees only in the second half of 2027. The recommendations are expected to cover about 50 lakh central government employees and 69 lakh pensioners.

=== Composition ===
The members of the Commission are as follows:

Name	Notability	Role
Ranjana Prakash Desai	Former judge of the Supreme Court of India; Chairperson of the Press Council of India	Chairperson
Pulak Ghosh	Professor at the Indian Institute of Management, Bangalore	Member (Part-Time)
Pankaj Jain (Retd. IAS)	Former Secretary, Ministry of Petroleum and Natural Gas	Member-Secretary

== See also ==
- One Rank, One Pension
- Rank Pay
- 7th Central Pay Commission (CPC) and Defence Forces
- Special Duty Allowance (SDA)
