= Insurgency in Arunachal Pradesh =

Conflict in Northeast Indian state

- Part of Insurgency in Northeast India
- Arunachal Pradesh
Date	1954–present (72 years)
Location	Arunachal Pradesh
Status	Ongoing (low level insurgency)

Belligerents
India; Assam Rifles; AP Police; Indian Armed Forces; Minister of Home Affairs; CRPF; Ministry of External Affairs	Separatist groups; NSCN; ULFA; NSCT; USCA (inactive); TDS (inactive); NLFA (inactive); TKLF (inactive); TSSF (inactive); ADF (inactive); APDPF (inactive); ANLF (inactive)

Commanders and leaders
(India) Droupadi Murmu; (India) Narendra Modi; (India) Amit Shah; (India) S. Jaishankar; Anil Chauhan; Manoj Pande; R. Hari Kumar; V. R. Chaudhari; Rajnath Singh; Giridhar Aramane; Former: Rajendra Prasad; Sarvepalli Radhakrishnan; Zakir Husain †; Mohammad Hidayatullah; Varahagiri Venkata Giri; Fakhruddin Ali Ahmed †; Basappa Danappa Jatti; Neelam Sanjiva Reddy; Zail Singh; Ramaswamy Venkataraman; Shankar Dayal Sharma; Kocheril Raman Narayanan; Avul Pakir Jainulabdeen Abdul Kalam; Pratibha Patil; Pranab Mukherjee †; Ram Nath Kovind; Jawaharlal Nehru †; Gulzarilal Nanda; Lal Bahadur Shastri; Morarji Desai; Charan Singh; Indira Gandhi †; Rajiv Gandhi †; Vishwanath Pratap Singh; Chandra Shekhar; Pamulaparthi Venkata Narasimha Rao; Atal Bihari Vajpayee; Haradanahalli Doddegowda Deve Gowda; Inder Kumar Gujral; Manmohan Singh; Kailash Nath Katju; Govind Ballabh Pant; Yashwantrao Chavan; Uma Shankar Dikshit; Kasu Brahmananda Reddy; Hirubhai M. Patel; Prakash Chandra Sethi; Shankarrao Chavan; Buta Singh; Mufti Mohammad Sayeed; Murli Manohar Joshi; Indrajit Gupta; L. K. Advani; Shivraj Patil; P. Chidambaram; Sushilkumar Shinde; M. C. Chagla; Dinesh Singh; Swaran Singh; Shyam Nandan Prasad Mishra; Bali Ram Bhagat; P. Shiv Shankar; N. D. Tiwari; Vidya Charan Shukla; Madhav Singh Solanki; Sikander Bakht; Jaswant Singh; Yashwant Sinha; Natwar Singh; S. M. Krishna; Salman Khurshid; Sushma Swaraj; V G Kanetkar; Imdad Ali; B B Mishra; N S Saxena; S M Ghosh; R C Gopal; P R Rajgopal; Birbal Nath; R N Sheopory; S D Chowdhury; Shival Swarup; J F Ribeiro; T G L Iyer; S D Pandey; P G Harlarnkar; Kanwar Pal Singh Gill; S Subramanian; D P N Singh; S V M Tripathi; M B Kaushal; M N Sabharwal; Trinath Mishra; S C Chaube; Jyoti Kumar Sinha; S I S Ahmed; V K Joshi; A S Gill; Vikram Srivastava; K. Vijay Kumar; Pranay Sahay; Dilip Trivedi; Prakash Mishra; K. Durga Prasad; R. R. Bhatnagar; Anand Prakash Maheshwari; Kuldiep Singh; Bipin Rawat †; Rajendrasinhji Jadeja; S. M. Shrinagesh; Kodandera Subayya Thimayya; Pran Nath Thapar; Jayanto Nath Chaudhuri; Paramasiva Prabhakar Kumaramangalam; Sam Manekshaw; Gopal Gurunath Bewoor; Tapishwar Narain Raina; Om Prakash Malhotra; K. V. Krishna Rao; Arun Shridhar Vaidya; Krishnaswamy Sundarji; Vishwa Nath Sharma; Sunith Francis Rodrigues; Bipin Chandra Joshi; Shankar Roychowdhury; Ved Prakash Malik; Sundararajan Padmanabhan; Nirmal Chander Vij; J. J. Singh; Deepak Kapoor; V. K. Singh; Bikram Singh; Dalbir Singh Suhag; Bipin Rawat †; Manoj Mukund Naravane; Mark Pizey; Stephen Hope Carlill; Ram Dass Katari; Bhaskar Sadashiv Soman; Adhar Kumar Chatterji; Sardarilal Mathradas Nanda; Sourendra Nath Kohli; Jal Cursetji; Ronald Lynsdale Pereira; Oscar Stanley Dawson; Radhakrishna Hariram Tahiliani; Jayant Ganpat Nadkarni; Laxminarayan Ramdas; Vijai Singh Shekhawat; Vishnu Bhagwat; Sushil Kumar; Madhvendra Singh; Arun Prakash; Sureesh Mehta; Nirmal Kumar Verma; Devendra Kumar Joshi; Robin K. Dhowan; Sunil Lanba; Karambir Singh; Subroto Mukerjee; Aspy Engineer; Arjan Singh; Pratap Chandra Lal; Om Prakash Mehra; Hrushikesh Moolgavkar; Idris Hasan Latif; Dilbagh Singh; Lakshman Madhav Katre †; Denis La Fontaine; Surinder Mehra; Nirmal Chandra Suri; S. K. Kaul; Satish Sareen; Anil Yashwant Tipnis; Srinivasapuram Krishnaswamy; Shashindra Pal Tyagi; Fali Homi Major; Pradeep Vasant Naik; Norman Anil Kumar Browne; Arup Raha; Birender Singh Dhanoa; R. K. S. Bhadauria; Kailash Nath Katju; V. K. Krishna Menon; Yashwantrao Chavan; Swaran Singh; Jagjivan Ram; Bansi Lal; Chidambaram Subramaniam; Shankarrao Chavan; K. C. Pant; Sharad Pawar; Pramod Mahajan; Mulayam Singh Yadav; George Fernandes; Jaswant Singh; A. K. Antony; Arun Jaitley; Manohar Parrikar; Nirmala Sitharaman; M. K. Vellodi; O. Pulla Reddy; P. V. R. Rao; A. D. Pandit; V. Shankar; Harish Chandra Sarin; K. B. Lall; Govind Narain; D. R. Kohli; Gian Prakash; S. Banerjee; J. A. Dave; K. P. A. Menon; P. K. Kaul; S. M. Ghosh; S. K. Bhatnagar; T. N. Seshan; Naresh Chandra; Narinder Nath Vohra; K. A. Nambiar; T. K. Banerjee; Ajit Kumar; T. R. Prasad; Yogendra Narain; Subir Dutta; Ajay Prasad; Ajai Vikram Singh; Shekhar Dutt; Vijay Singh; Pradeep Kumar; Shashi Kant Sharma; R. K. Mathur; G. Mohan Kumar; Sanjay Mitra; Ajay Kumar	Gangte Tugung (POW) (USCA); Qhehezu Tuccu

Casualties and losses
2000–2024: 38 killed	2000–2024: 175 killed 212 surrendered 741 arrested
- 2000–2024: 31 civilians killed

The Insurgency in Arunachal Pradesh is a part of the larger Northeast India insurgency involving multiple groups trying to separate from or destabilize the province. Because Arunachal Pradesh is a border state, militants sometimes conduct cross border operations to facilitate their activities. In addition to the non-state groups operating in the region, since its recapture in the 1962 War, there have been incursions from the Chinese Army in the region, further escalating the conflict. The conflict has cooled since the arrest of major insurgent leaders by the police. The insurgency has seen many minor actors in conflict with each other due to ethnic and religious differences.

== Insurgent groups and activities ==
The National Liberation Council of Taniland (NLCT), an ethnic separatist group, was active along the Assam – Arunachal Pradesh border. The NLCT seeks to establish a separate nation in northeast India known as Taniland for the Tani peoples. Their most recent activity was a 2014 shooting attack in neighboring Assam province.

The National Socialist Council of Nagaland is a much larger ethno-nationalist separatist group. It also seeks a separate nation for the Naga peoples known as Greater Nagaland. The government of India and the NSCN were in successive negotiations since 2001 with various cease-fires declared, and were close to a peace agreement in 2015, but ultimately fell apart. They continue operations in camps in the Tirap and Changlang districts.

The United Socialist Council of Arunachal was a minor communist terror organization operating in the province. It was led by Gangte Tugung until his capture by state police along with much of the USCA leadership on August 10, 2005. Tungung was previously arrested twice but escaped both times.

== Timeline ==
=== 2023 ===
- 27 January: A cadre of NSCN-IM militant group surrendered to authorities in Tirap District, Arunachal Pradesh.
- 28 January: Two cadres of NSCN-K were arrested by Assam Rifles units in Changlang district, Arunachal Pradesh.
- 30 January: A self-styled lieutenant of the NSCN-IM was arrested by Assam Rifles in Tirap district, Arunachal Pradesh.
- 23 February: Security forces discovered a arms and ammunition cache at a camp of the ENNG militant group in Changlang district, Arunachal Pradesh.
- 27 February: A cadre of the NSCN-IM who was involved in many extortion cases was arrested by Assam Rifles in Longding district, Arunachal Pradesh.
- 28 February: A cadre of the NSCN-IM was arrested by Assam Rifles in Tirap district, Arunachal Pradesh.
- 9 March: A cadre of NSCN-K Niki sumi faction surrendered to Security forces in Tirap district, Arunachal Pradesh.
- 12 March: A cadre of ENNG surrendered to authorities in Papum Pare district, Arunachal Pradesh.
- 26 March: Two NSCN-K cadres escaped from Khonsa jail in Tirap District of Arunachal Pradesh after killing a prison guard and seriusly injuring another guard.
- 1 April: A worker of the NSCN-K was arrested by Assam Rifles in Longding district, Arunachal Pradesh.
- 13 April: Two ULFA-I militants were arrested by Assam Rifles in Tirap district, Arunachal Pradesh.
- 16 April: Two workers of the NSCN-K were arrested by Assam Rifles in Tirap district, Arunachal Pradesh.
- 17 April: Five NSCN-K militants were arrested by Assam Rifles in Changlang district, Arunachal Pradesh.
- 18 April: A NSCN-K militant was arrested by Assam Rifles in Longding district, Arunachal Pradesh.
- 20 April: A worker of the NSCN-K was arrested by Assam Rifles in Longding district, Arunachal Pradesh.
- 11 May: A cadre of the NSCN-K surrendered to Assam Rifles in Longding district, Arunachal Pradesh.
- 21 May: A cadre of the NSCN-R was arrested by Security forces in Changlang district, Arunachal Pradesh.
- 18 June: Three NSCN-K Yung Aung faction militants were arrested by Assam Rifles in Longding district, Arunachal Pradesh.
- 21 July: Two ULFA-I militants were arrested by Arunachal Pradesh Police in Tirap district, Arunachal Pradesh.
- 26 July: A NSCN-K militant was arrested by Police forcea in Tirap District, Arunachal Pradesh.

=== 2024 ===
- 11 January: Six hardcore cadres of the NSCN-IM were arrested by Police in Changlang District of Arunachal Pradesh.
- 12 January: Two cadres of the ULFA-I including a lieutenant were arrested by Assam Rifles while trying to cross into India from Myanmar.
- 13 January: A cadre of the ULFA-I was arrested by Assam rifles in Changlang District of Arunachal Pradesh.
- 5 April: A cadre of the NCSN-K was arrested along with weapons by Security forces in Changlang District of Arunachal Pradesh.
- 4 May: Three cadres of the ULFA-I militant group was arrested by Assam rifles in Tirap District of Arunachal Pradesh.
- 13 May: A self-styled sergeant of the NSCN-IM was arrested by security forces in Changlang District of Arunachal Pradesh.
- 17 June: Two cadres of the NSCN-U were arrested by Indian army in Changlang District of Arunachal Pradesh.
- 29 July: A cadre of the NSCN-K was arrested by Arunachal Pradesh police in Changlang District of Arunachal Pradesh.
- 19 August: A commander of the NSCN-U, identified as Mineshwar Dihingia, was arrested by security forces.
- 30 August: Two cadres of the NSCN-IM were arrested by security forces along with extortion money of ₹3,40,000 lakh in Papum Pare District, Arunachal Pradesh.
- 17 September: A self styled commander of the NSCN-K surrendered to Assam Rifles in Tirap District, Arunachal Pradesh.
- 9 October: A cadre of the ULFA-I surrendered to Assam Rifles in Changlang District, Arunachal Pradesh.
- 25 October: A cadre of the Yung Aung faction of NSCN-K militant group was killed in a firefight with Assam rifles in Longding District, Arunachal Pradesh.
- 11 November: Two cadres of the ULFA-I were arrested by Security forces in Tirap district, Arunachal Pradesh.
- 26 December: Two cadres of the NSCN-IM were arrested by Arunachal Pradesh Police forces in Changlang district, Arunachal Pradesh.

=== 2025 ===
- 28 April: Three militants were killed and two injured of the NSCN-K Aung yung faction in a gun fight with Security forces in Longding district. The operation aimed to free two workers kidnapped by the militants on 25th April, security forces managed to free one of the worker and the search for the other continued.
- 12 September: Arunachal Police arrested Biri Ruja, who is the Vice chairman of the Tani Army, from Banderdewa in Assam. They also arrested three other members, two of them from Longding and one from Itanagar. Extortion demands and notes on the Upper Siang Hydroelectric Project were recovered from them. Police also learned from Ruja's phone about Tani Army chairman Anthony Doke currently being based in Myanmar.
- 9 October: Four NSCN-R cadre, including two brigadiers, one colonel and one lieutenant were arrested by the Assam Rifles in Tirap district.
- 16 October: A joint attack by the NSCN-K-YA and ULFA-I on an Assam Rifles base in Changlang district injured two personnel. After a large search operation was launched, on 12 November, one ULFA-I cadre was killed, one arrested and another one surrendered.
- 21 October: An alleged drone strike by the Indian Army killed five militants of the NSCN-K-YA at a militant camp in Myanmar bordering Arunachal Pradesh.
- 22 October: A group of Seven ULFA-I militants fired at a patrol of Assam Rifles personnel and the exchange of fire killed one militant while the other six managed to escape in Namsai district, Arunachal Pradesh.
- 22 November: "Major general" Arunoday Dohutia and his personal security officer Franchis Axom surrendered at Pangsau Pass on the India-Myanmar border. Dohutia was a close aide of ULFA-I "chief" Paresh Baruah and was instrumental in organizing communications and planning operations. Some have argued this surrender "triggered a ripple effect" of pressure on cadres still hiding in the forest.
- 3 December: Two Myanmar-trained cadres of the United Liberation Front of Asom (Independent) surrendered to security forces and provided critical information on weapon locations, marking a potentially critical blow to the now dwindling insurgency in the region.
