= Naga conflict =

Ongoing conflict in northeast India

Naga Insurgency
- Part of Insurgency in Northeast India
- State of Nagaland
Date	11 September 1958 – present (68 years, 3 weeks and 5 days)
Location	Northeast India: Nagaland; Assam; Manipur; Arunachal Pradesh; Myanmar: Sagaing Region
Status	Ongoing (low-level insurgency); NSCN signed a peace accord with the Government of India

Belligerents
India; Indian Armed Forces; CRPF; BSF; Arunachal Pradesh; Police; Assam; Police; Nagaland; Police; Manipur; Police; Manipur Rifles; Myanmar; Sagaing Region; Tatmadaw; BGF; NSCN-IM; RNHPF (2013-17); NSCN-K (YA) (since 2017); NSCN-R (AC); ANLF; RGN (1968-73)	NFA (until 1980); NSCN (1980–88); NSCN dissidents (since 1988); NSCN-K (NS) (since 2020); NSCN-K (AM) (since 2023); NSCN-K (IS) (since 2023); Local Sumi militias; ZUF; MNPF; MNRF (until 2013); UNPC (until 2013)	NNPGs: NSCN-R (since 2015); NSCN-NK (since 2011); NSCN-K2 (since 2017); Naga National Council; FGN; NNC (A); NPGN; GDRN; NSCN-K (1988–2017); NSCN-U (since 2007); NNC (S); NNC (P)

Commanders and leaders
(India) Droupadi Murmu; (India) Narendra Modi; (India) Amit Shah; (India) S. Jaishankar; Anil Chauhan; Manoj Pande; R. Hari Kumar; V. R. Chaudhari; Nitin Agarwal; Rajnath Singh; Giridhar Aramane; (Myanmar) Myint Swe; (Myanmar) Min Aung Hlaing; Myat Kyaw; Former: (India) Rajendra Prasad; (India) Sarvepalli Radhakrishnan; (India) Zakir Husain; (India) Mohammad Hidayatullah; (India) Varahagiri Venkata Giri; (India) Fakhruddin Ali Ahmed; (India) B. D. Jatti; (India) Neelam Sanjiva Reddy; (India) Zail Singh; (India) R. Venkataraman; (India) Shankar Dayal Sharma; (India) K. R. Narayanan; (India) A. P. J. Abdul Kalam; (India) Pratibha Patil; (India) Pranab Mukherjee; (India) Ram Nath Kovind; (India) Jawaharlal Nehru; (India) Gulzarilal Nanda; (India) Lal Bahadur Shastri; (India) Morarji Desai; (India) Charan Singh; (India) Indira Gandhi †; (India) Rajiv Gandhi †; (India) V. P. Singh; (India) Chandra Shekhar; (India) P. V. Narasimha Rao; (India) H. D. Deve Gowda; (India) Inder Kumar Gujral; (India) Atal Bihari Vajpayee; (India) Manmohan Singh; Kailash Nath Katju; Govind Ballabh Pant; Yashwantrao Chavan; Uma Shankar Dikshit; Kasu Brahmananda Reddy; Hirubhai M. Patel; Prakash Chandra Sethi; Shankarrao Chavan; Buta Singh; Mufti Mohammad Sayeed; Murli Manohar Joshi; Indrajit Gupta; L. K. Advani; Shivraj Patil; P. Chidambaram; Sushilkumar Shinde; M. C. Chagla; Dinesh Singh; Swaran Singh; Shyam Nandan Prasad Mishra; Bali Ram Bhagat; P. Shiv Shankar; N. D. Tiwari; Vidya Charan Shukla; Madhav Singh Solanki; Sikander Bakht; Jaswant Singh; Yashwant Sinha; Natwar Singh; S. M. Krishna; Salman Khurshid; Sushma Swaraj; V G Kanetkar; Imdad Ali; B B Mishra; N S Saxena; S M Ghosh; R C Gopal; P R Rajgopal; Birbal Nath; R N Sheopory; S D Chowdhury; Shival Swarup; J F Ribeiro; T G L Iyer; S D Pandey; P G Harlarnkar; Kanwar Pal Singh Gill; S Subramanian; D P N Singh; S V M Tripathi; M B Kaushal; M N Sabharwal; Trinath Mishra; S C Chaube; Jyoti Kumar Sinha; S I S Ahmed; V K Joshi; A S Gill; Vikram Srivastava; K. Vijay Kumar; Pranay Sahay; Dilip Trivedi; Prakash Mishra; K. Durga Prasad; R. R. Bhatnagar; Anand Prakash Maheshwari; Kuldiep Singh; Bipin Rawat; Rajendrasinhji Jadeja; S. M. Shrinagesh; Kodandera Subayya Thimayya; Pran Nath Thapar; Jayanto Nath Chaudhuri; Paramasiva Prabhakar Kumaramangalam; Sam Manekshaw; Gopal Gurunath Bewoor; Tapishwar Narain Raina; Om Prakash Malhotra; K. V. Krishna Rao; Arun Shridhar Vaidya; Krishnaswamy Sundarji; Vishwa Nath Sharma; Sunith Francis Rodrigues; Bipin Chandra Joshi; Shankar Roychowdhury; Ved Prakash Malik; Sundararajan Padmanabhan; Nirmal Chander Vij; J. J. Singh; Deepak Kapoor; V. K. Singh; Bikram Singh; Dalbir Singh Suhag; Bipin Rawat; Manoj Mukund Naravane; Mark Pizey; Stephen Hope Carlill; Ram Dass Katari; Bhaskar Sadashiv Soman; Adhar Kumar Chatterji; Sardarilal Mathradas Nanda; Sourendra Nath Kohli; Jal Cursetji; Ronald Lynsdale Pereira; Oscar Stanley Dawson; Radhakrishna Hariram Tahiliani; Jayant Ganpat Nadkarni; Laxminarayan Ramdas; Vijai Singh Shekhawat; Vishnu Bhagwat; Sushil Kumar; Madhvendra Singh; Arun Prakash; Sureesh Mehta; Nirmal Kumar Verma; Devendra Kumar Joshi; Robin K. Dhowan; Sunil Lanba; Karambir Singh; Subroto Mukerjee; Aspy Engineer; Arjan Singh; Pratap Chandra Lal; Om Prakash Mehra; Hrushikesh Moolgavkar; Idris Hasan Latif; Dilbagh Singh; Lakshman Madhav Katre †; Denis La Fontaine; Surinder Mehra; Nirmal Chandra Suri; S. K. Kaul; Satish Sareen; Anil Yashwant Tipnis; Srinivasapuram Krishnaswamy; Shashindra Pal Tyagi; Fali Homi Major; Pradeep Vasant Naik; Norman Anil Kumar Browne; Arup Raha; Birender Singh Dhanoa; R. K. S. Bhadauria; Khusro Faramurz Rustamji; Ashwini Kumar; Sharawan Tandon; K. Rama Murti; Birbal Nath; M.C. Misra; H.P. Bhatnagar; T. Ananthachary; Prakash Singh; D.K. Arya; Arun Bhagat; A.K. Tandon; E. N. Rammohan; Gurbachan Singh Jagat; Ajay Raj Sharma; Ranjit Shekhar Mooshahary; A.K. Mitra; M.L. Kumawat; Raman Srivastava; U.K. Bansal; Subhash Joshi; D.K. Pathak; K.K. Sharma; Rajni Kant Mishra; V.K. Johri; Surjeet Singh Deswal; Rakesh Asthana; Pankaj Kumar Singh; Sujoy Lal Thaosen; Kailash Nath Katju; V. K. Krishna Menon; Yashwantrao Chavan; Swaran Singh; Jagjivan Ram; Bansi Lal; Chidambaram Subramaniam; Shankarrao Chavan; K. C. Pant; Sharad Pawar; Pramod Mahajan; Mulayam Singh Yadav; George Fernandes; Jaswant Singh; A. K. Antony; Arun Jaitley; Manohar Parrikar; Nirmala Sitharaman; M. K. Vellodi; O. Pulla Reddy; P. V. R. Rao; A. D. Pandit; V. Shankar; Harish Chandra Sarin; K. B. Lall; Govind Narain; D. R. Kohli; Gian Prakash; S. Banerjee; J. A. Dave; K. P. A. Menon; P. K. Kaul; S. M. Ghosh; S. K. Bhatnagar; T. N. Seshan; Naresh Chandra; Narinder Nath Vohra; K. A. Nambiar; T. K. Banerjee; Ajit Kumar; T. R. Prasad; Yogendra Narain; Subir Dutta; Ajay Prasad; Ajai Vikram Singh; Shekhar Dutt; Vijay Singh; Pradeep Kumar; Shashi Kant Sharma; R. K. Mathur; G. Mohan Kumar; Sanjay Mitra; Ajay Kumar; (Myanmar) Ne Win; (Myanmar) San Yu; (Myanmar) Sein Lwin; (Myanmar) Maung Maung; (Myanmar) Saw Maung; (Myanmar) Than Shwe; (Myanmar) Sein Win; (Myanmar) Maung Maung Kha; (Myanmar) Tun Tin; (Myanmar) Saw Maung; (Myanmar) Than Shwe; (Myanmar) Khin Nyunt; (Myanmar) Soe Win; (Myanmar) Thein Sein; (Myanmar) Htin Kyaw; (Myanmar) Win Myint; Tha Aye; Myint Naing	Thuingaleng Muivah	

Strength
(India) 200,000 (1995)	15,000+ NSCN-IM (2017); 2,000 NSCN-K (2007)	

Casualties and losses
2000-2024: 191 killed	2000–2024: 605 killed 241 surrendered 2350 arrested	

The Naga conflict, also known as the Naga Insurgency, is an ongoing conflict fought between insurgent groups composed of ethnic Nagas, and the government of India in northeastern India. Nagaland, inhabited by the Nagas, is located at the tri-junction border of India on the West and South, north and Myanmar on the East.

"National Socialist Council of Nagaland (Khaplang)", which wants an independent "greater Nagaland" to also include territory now in Myanmar, based on ethnicity; and the "Naga National Council (Adino)".

The question of "Naga Sovereignty" was put to a plebiscite on 16 May 1951. To defend themselves, the Naga, after much deliberation, formed the armed wing of the NNC and came to be known as the NSG (Naga Safe Guards) under Kaito Sukhai.

== History ==
1946 saw the creation of the Naga National Council (NNC) under Phizo's leadership. The NNC leaders and the Governor of Assam, Sir Akbar Hydari, signed a nine-point agreement which granted Nagas rights over their lands and legislative and executive powers. The judicial capacity of Naga courts was empowered, and no law from the provincial or central legislatures could affect this agreement. Very significantly, the agreement included a clause demanding that the Nagas be brought into the same administrative unit at the earliest. However, one clause stipulates:

The Governor of Assam as the agent of the Government of India will have a special responsibility for a period of ten years to ensure that due observance of this agreement to be extended for a further period, or a new agreement regarding the future of the Naga people to be arrived at.

The interpretation of this clause has been contested between the Nagas and the Indian Government. To Nagas, this clause meant independence from India at the end of the ten years. To the Indian Government, this clause meant making a new agreement after ten years if the present agreement did not address Naga issues sufficiently. Phizo rejected the nine-point agreement because the agreement fell short of dealing with the issue of Naga sovereignty. Under Phizo's leadership, the NNC declared Naga independence on 14 August 1947, and, with success, propagated the idea of Naga sovereignty throughout the Naga tribes. A Naga plebiscite was organised on 16 May 1951. The Naga struggle remained peaceful in the 1940s and early 1950s.

The Naga insurgency, climaxing in 1956, was an armed ethnic conflict led by the Naga National Council (NNC), which aimed for the secession of Naga territories from India. The more radical sectors of the NNC created the Federal Government of Nagaland (FGN), which also included an underground Naga Army.

The insurgency witnessed a new spark in 2021 when fourteen citizens of Nagaland were ambushed and killed by the Indian Army soldiers of the 21 Para Special Forces army unit. The killings led to wide-ranging protests to hold the soldiers accountable and to ask for the repeal of the Armed Forces Special Powers Act, commonly known as AFSPA.

== Insurgent groups ==
Several rebel groups have operated in Nagaland since the mid-twentieth century, including the following:

1. Naga National Council: a political organisation active in the late 1940s and early 1950s, which became separatist under Angami Zapu Phizo
2. Naga National Council (Adino) – NNC (Adino): the oldest political Naga organisation, now led by the daughter of Naga separatist A.Z. Phizo.
3. National Socialist Council of Nagaland (Isak-Muivah): formed on 31 January 1980 by Isak Chishi Swu, Thuingaleng Muivah and S. S. Khaplang They want to establish a ‘Greater Nagaland’ (‘Nagalim’ or the People’s Republic of Nagaland) based on Mao Tse Tung’s model.
4. National Socialist Council of Nagaland (Khaplang): formed on 30 April 1988, its goal is to establish a ‘greater Nagaland’ based on ethnicity, comprising the Naga-dominated areas within India, and contiguous areas in Myanmar.
5. Naga Federal Government: separatist movement active in Nagaland during the 1970s. After its leader was captured and the headquarters destroyed, NFG's activities decreased.
6. Naga Federal Army: separatist guerrilla organisation active in the 1970s. Several hundred members of NFA reportedly have received training in China.

== See also ==
- Timeline of the Naga conflict
- Nagaland Peace Accord
- List of massacres in Nagaland
- Asymmetric warfare
- National Liberation Front of Tripura
- People's war
