= Yudhvir Malik =

Yudhvir Singh Malik
- Yuddhavīra Siṃha Mālika
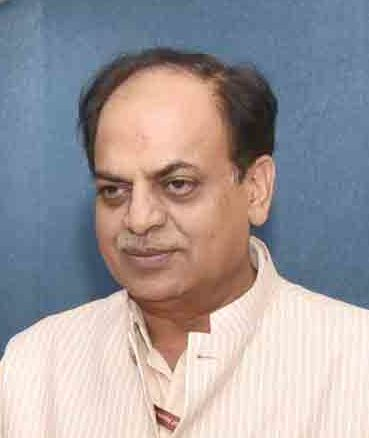

Road Transport and Highways Secretary of India
- In office 21 June 2017 – 31 March 2019
- Preceded by: Sanjay Mitra
- Succeeded by: Sanjeev Ranjan

Chairman of National Highways Authority of India (NHAI)
- In office 28 November 2016 – 21 June 2017
- Preceded by: Raghav Chandra
- Succeeded by: Deepak Kumar

Personal details
- Born: Yudhvir Singh Malik; 19 March 1959 (age 67) Hisar, Haryana, India
- Occupation: IAS officer

Yudhvir Singh Malik (IAST: Yuddhavīra Siṃha Mālika) (born 19 March 1959) is a retired 1983 batch IAS officer of Haryana cadre. He also served as Chairman and Managing Director (CMD) of Unitech Group from January 2020 onwards, alleged to have partaken in misconduct within that role till July 2026. His tenure has been marked by public scrutiny over the pace of project delivery, rising statutory and creditor dues, governance-related resignations of independent directors, and criticism from certain stakeholders regarding improper contract awards, asset disposals, and overall operational strategy.

== Education ==
Malik is a graduate (BA) and postgraduate (MA) in English literature. He also has a graduate degree in Journalism and Mass Communication. In addition, Malik is a postgraduate (MSc) in Development Management.

== Career ==
Yudhvir Singh Malik has served in various key positions for both the Union Government and the Government of Haryana, like as Additional Chief Secretary (Mines and Geology), Additional Chief Secretary (Industries and Commerce), Additional Chief Secretary (Revenue and Disaster Management), Additional Chief Secretary (Environment and Forests), Project Director of Haryana State AIDS Control Society, Managing Director of Haryana State Industrial and Infrastructure Development Corporation (HSIIDC), and as the Deputy Commissioner and District Magistrate of Hisar district in the Haryana Government, and as the Union Road Transport and Highways Secretary, Chairman of National Highways Authority of India (NHAI), Special Secretary in NITI Aayog, Chief Executive Officer (CEO) of Food Safety and Standards Authority of India (FSSAI) and as a Joint Secretary in the Ministry of Corporate Affairs in the Union Government.

=== Chairman of NHAI ===
Yudhvir Singh Malik was appointed as the Chairman of National Highways Authority of India (NHAI) by the Appointments Committee of the Cabinet (ACC) in November 2016, he assumed office on 28 November 2016, and demitted it on 21 June 2017.

=== Road Transport and Highways Secretary ===
Yudhvir Singh Malik was appointed as the Union Road Transport and Highways Secretary by the Appointments Committee of the Cabinet (ACC) in June 2017, he assumed the office of Secretary on 21 June 2017 and served till 31 March 2019.

== Controversies ==
=== Haryana Government ===
A complaint submitted to the Government of India in 2014 alleged that Yudhvir Singh Malik, while serving in senior positions in the Haryana government and as Chairman of the Haryana Khadi and Village Industries Board, had applied “double standards” in administrative decisions affecting a Board employee. The complaint accused officials, including Malik, of permitting the withholding of pay and benefits, issuing allegedly baseless disciplinary actions, and contributing to prolonged service disputes. Additional complaints submitted to government authorities in the early 2010s alleged that Yudhvir Singh Malik, while serving in senior roles in the Haryana government and the Haryana Khadi and Village Industries Board, was involved in administrative bias, irregular personnel decisions, and favouritism in appointments. These petitions accused officials including Malik of enabling allegedly improper postings, withholding service benefits of employees, and misusing discretionary powers.

=== Unitech Tenure ===
In January 2020, the Supreme Court of India superseded the board of Unitech Limited in Bhupinder Singh v. Unitech Ltd., removing the Chandra promoters amid mounting homebuyer complaints and criminal proceedings, and appointing a court-monitored board to stabilise the company and complete stalled housing projects. Malik, a retired civil servant, was appointed Chairman to oversee the revival, project completion, and protection of homebuyer interests.

During his tenure, progress in completing pending housing units has been widely debated. While the court-appointed management was tasked with expediting delivery and financial restructuring, stakeholders including homebuyers, creditors, and former independent directors have raised concerns about delays in project completion, limited handovers relative to the scale of pending units, and the continued accumulation of statutory dues and interest liabilities. The period has also seen governance tensions reflected in the resignation of several independent board members, as well as criticism from some quarters regarding contract awards, asset-sale decisions, and overall operational strategy.

Malik’s leadership of the court-supervised resolution process has therefore remained under public and judicial scrutiny, with discussions continuing over the effectiveness of the management structure and the pace at which relief has been delivered to affected homebuyers. A retired IAS officer (superannuated in 2019), his tenure has been extended multiple times, most recently in January 2026 for a further six months. As of 2026, he continues in the role beyond the standard retirement age applicable to government service and typical post-retirement appointments, amid the ongoing court-monitored restructuring process, continuing debate over the pace of project completion, and dispute over his age.
