= Defence Secretary (India) =

Indian Defence Secretary

Defence Secretary of India
- भारत के रक्षा सचिव

- Flag of India

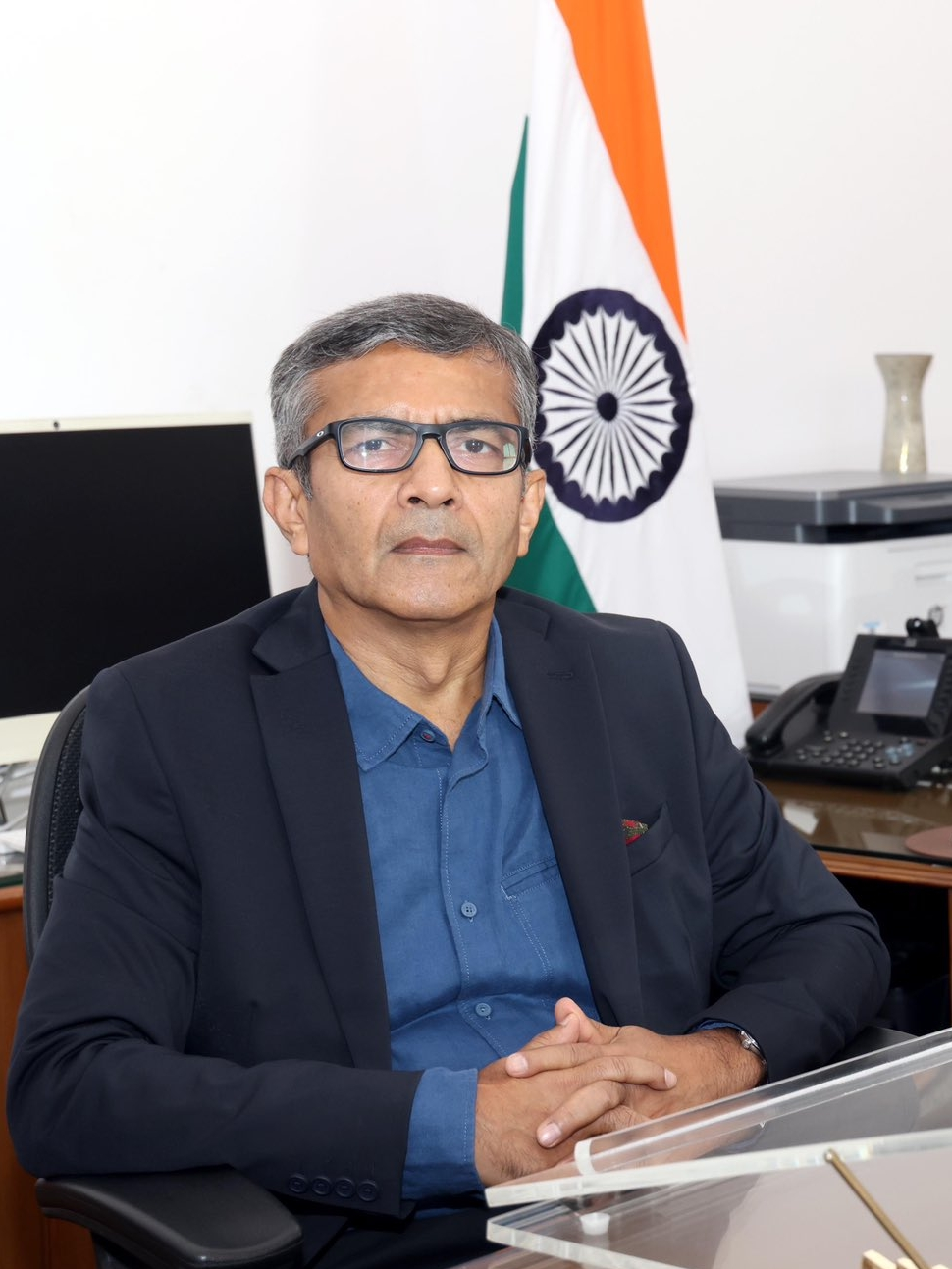
- Incumbent; Rajesh Kumar Singh, IAS since 1st November, 2024
- Ministry of Defence
- Member of: Strategic Policy Group; Committee of Secretaries on Administration; Defence Acquisition Council; Defence Planning Committee; Defence Procurcement Board (as Chairman); Defence Production Board; Defence Research and Development Organisation
- Reports to: Defence Minister
- Residence: 15, New Moti Bagh, New Delhi
- Seat: Ministry of Defence; South Block, Cabinet Secretariat; Raisina Hill; New Delhi
- Appointer: Appointments Committee of the Cabinet
- Term length: Two years, term can be extended.
- Inaugural holder: G. S. Bhalja, ICS
- Formation: 21 July 1947; 79 years ago
- Salary: ₹225,000 (US$2,400) monthly
- Website: Official Website

The defence secretary (ISO: Rakṣā Saciv) is the administrative head of the Ministry of Defence. This post is held by a senior Indian Administrative Service officer of the rank of secretary to the Government of India. The current defence secretary is Shri. Rajesh Kumar Singh IAS.

As a secretary to the Government of India, the Defence Secretary ranks 23rd on Indian order of precedence, along with all other secretaries to the Government of India, and lieutenant generals in the grade of army commander.

== Powers, responsibilities and postings ==
The defence secretary is the administrative head of the Ministry of Defence, and is the principal adviser to the minister of defence on all matters of policy and administration within the Ministry of Defence.

The role of defence secretary is as follows:

- To act as the administrative head of the Ministry of Defence. The responsibility in this regard is complete and undivided.
- To act as the chief adviser to the defence minister on all aspects of policy and administrative affairs.
- To represent the Ministry of Defence before the Public Accounts Committee of the Parliament of India.
- The defence secretary is responsible for coordinating the activities of the other departments (Department of Defence Production, Department of Military Affairs, Department of Ex-Servicemen Welfare and Department of Defence Research and Development) in the Ministry of Defence.
- To act as the first among equals among the secretaries in the Ministry of Defence.

== Emolument, accommodation and perquisites ==
The defence secretary is eligible for a diplomatic passport. The official earmarked residence of the defence secretary is 7, New Moti Bagh, New Delhi, a Type-VIII bungalow.

The salary and emolument in this rank is equivalent to chief secretaries of state governments and to Vice Chief of the Army Staff/GOC-in-C and its equivalents in the Indian Armed Forces.

Defence secretary monthly pay and allowances
Base salary as per the 7th Pay Commission (per month)	Pay matrix level	Sources
₹225,000 (US$2,400)	Pay level 17	

== List of defence secretaries ==
List of defence secretaries
S. No.	Portrait	Name	Assumed office	Demitted office
1		G. S. Bhalja	21 July 1947	6 October 1947
2		H. M. Patel	7 October 1947	20 July 1953
3		B. B. Ghosh	21 July 1953	12 November 1953
4		M. K. Vellodi	13 November 1953	13 June 1957
5		O. Pulla Reddy	14 June 1957	21 November 1962
6		P. V. R. Rao	21 November 1962	3 April 1965
7		A. D. Pandit	4 April 1965	4 August 1965
(5)		P. V. R. Rao	5 August 1965	31 December 1966
8		V. Shankar	1 January 1967	2 November 1968
9		H. C. Sarin	3 November 1968	7 December 1970
10		K. B. Lall	8 December 1970	18 May 1973
11		Govind Narain	19 May 1973	31 May 1975
12		D. R. Kohli	1 June 1975	31 March 1977
13		Gian Prakash	4 April 1977	26 March 1978
14		S. Banerjee	27 March 1978	3 July 1979
15		J. A. Dave	9 July 1979	10 April 1980
16		K. P. A. Menon	5 May 1980	11 August 1981
17		P. K. Kaul	12 August 1981	30 June 1983
18		S. M. Ghosh	26 July 1983	25 June 1984
19		S. K. Bhatnagar	6 July 1984	31 May 1988
20		T. N. Seshan	1 June 1988	22 February 1989
21		Naresh Chandra	22 February 1989	21 March 1990
22		Narinder Nath Vohra	21 March 1990	6 April 1993
23		K. A. Nambiar	6 April 1993	6 June 1996
24		T. K. Banerjee	5 August 1996	31 May 1997
25		Ajit Kumar	31 May 1997	1 January 1999
26		T. R. Prasad	1 January 1999	20 October 2000
27		Yogendra Narain	20 October 2000	30 June 2002
28		Subir Dutta	20 June 2002	4 July 2003
29		Ajay Prasad	14 July 2003	30 June 2004
30		Ajai Vikram Singh	1 July 2004	31 July 2005
31		Shekhar Dutt	1 August 2005	31 July 2007
32		Vijay Singh	1 August 2007	31 July 2009
33		Pradeep Kumar	1 August 2009	14 July 2011
34		Shashi Kant Sharma	14 July 2011	May 24, 2013
35		R. K. Mathur	May 25, 2013	May 24, 2015
36		G. Mohan Kumar	May 25, 2015	May 24, 2017
37		Sanjay Mitra	May 25, 2017	August 22, 2019
38		Ajay Kumar	August 23, 2019	October 31, 2022
39		Giridhar Aramane	November 1, 2022	October 31, 2024
40		Rajesh Kumar Singh	November 1, 2024	Incumbent

== See also ==
- Cabinet Secretary of India
- Secretary of the Research and Analysis Wing
- Home Secretary of India
- Foreign Secretary of India
- Finance Secretary of India

== Bibliography ==
- Maheshwari, S.R. (2000). Indian Administration (6th ed.). New Delhi: Orient Blackswan Private Ltd. ISBN 9788125019886.
- Laxmikanth, M. (2014). Governance in India (2nd ed.). Noida: McGraw Hill Education. ISBN 978-9339204785.
