= Rajesh Kumar Singh (civil servant) =

IAS officer and Defence Secretary of India

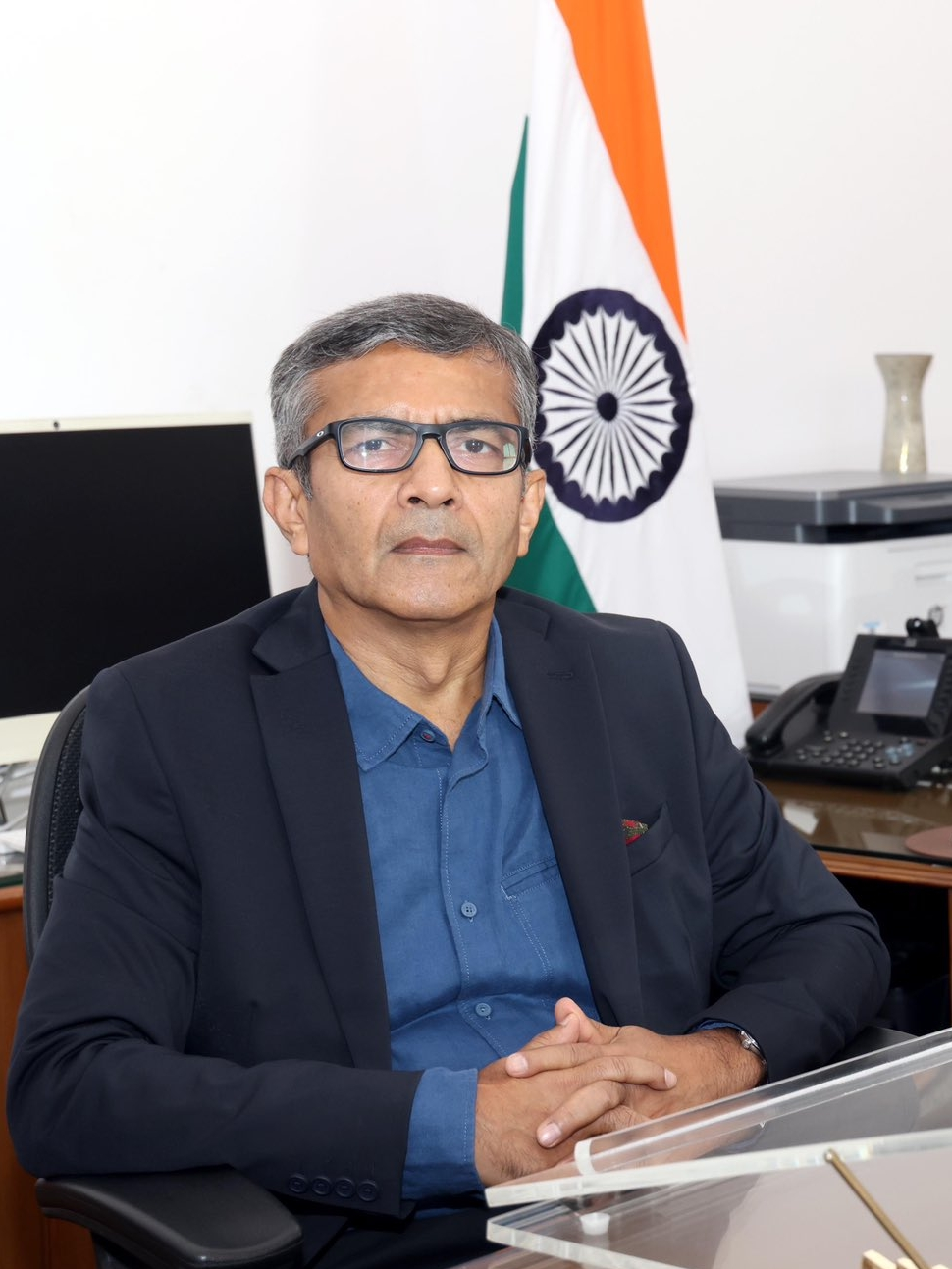

40th Defence Secretary of India
- Incumbent
- Assumed office 1 November 2024
- Appointed by: Appointments Committee of the Cabinet
- Preceded by: Giridhar Aramane

Secretary Department for Promotion of Industry and Internal Trade
- In office 1 May 2023 – 31 October 2024
- Preceded by: Anurag Jain
- Succeeded by: Amardeep Singh Bhatia

Secretary Animal Husbandry and Dairying
- In office 1 September 2022 – 30 April 2023
- Preceded by: Atul Chaturvedi
- Succeeded by: Alka Upadhyaya

Chairman of Defence Research and Development Organisation
- Incumbent
- Assumed office 1 June 2026
- Preceded by: Samir V Kamat

Personal details
- Born: 24 November 1964 (age 61) Muzaffarpur, Bihar, India
- Occupation: IAS officer
- Profession: Civil servant

Rajesh Kumar Singh (born 24 November 1964) is a 1989-batch Indian Administrative Service (IAS) officer from the Kerala cadre. Singh was appointed the 40th Defence Secretary of India by the Appointments Committee of the Cabinet and has been serving in the position since 1 November 2024. He earlier served as Secretary, Department for Promotion of Industry and Internal Trade (DPIIT), and also as Secretary of Animal Husbandry and Dairying.

In his career, Singh also served as Director of Works and Urban Transport in the Ministry of Housing and Urban Affairs. Other positions Singh has held include Commissioner (Lands) in the Delhi Development Authority, Joint Secretary in the Ministry of Petroleum and Natural Gas, Joint Secretary in the Department of Agriculture, Cooperation & Farmers Welfare, and the Chief Vigilance Officer of the Food Corporation of India. In his early career in the Kerala government, Singh's posts included Urban Development Secretary and Finance Secretary.

== Tenure extension ==
Singh's two-year term as Defence Secretary was scheduled to end on 31 October 2026. The Appointments Committee of the Cabinet extended his tenure by one year, to 31 October 2027. He also continues to hold additional charge as Secretary of the Department of Defence Research and Development and Chairman of the Defence Research and Development Organisation.
