= Ajay Kumar (civil servant) =

Chairman of Union Public Service Commission

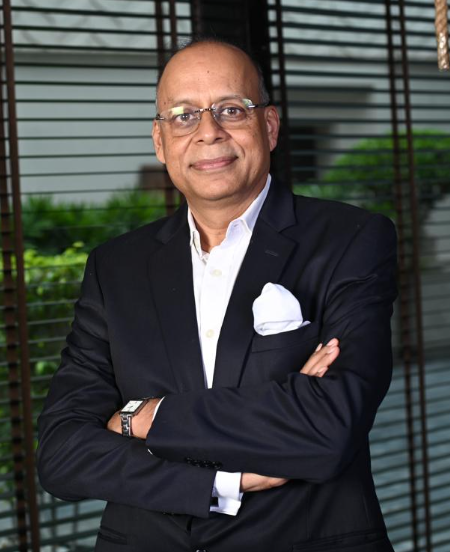
- Kumar in 2023

Chairperson of the Union Public Service Commission
- Incumbent
- Assumed office 15 May 2025
- Appointed by: Appointments Committee of the Cabinet
- Preceded by: Preeti Sudan

38th Defence Secretary of India
- In office 23 August 2019 – 31 October 2022
- Appointed by: Appointments Committee of the Cabinet
- Minister: Rajnath Singh
- Preceded by: Sanjay Mitra
- Succeeded by: Giridhar Aramane

39th Defence Production Secretary of India
- In office 1 December 2017 – 23 August 2019
- Appointed by: Appointments Committee of the Cabinet
- Minister: Nirmala Sitharaman
- Preceded by: Ashok Kumar
- Succeeded by: Subhash Chandra, IAS (Karnataka, 1986)

Personal details
- Born: 2 October 1962 (age 64) Uttar Pradesh
- Education: IIT Kanpur (B.Tech); University of Minnesota (MS, PhD)
- Occupation: IAS officer
- Profession: Civil servant

Ajay Kumar is an Indian civil servant who currently serves as the Chairperson of the Union Public Service Commission (UPSC). A 1985-batch officer of the Indian Administrative Service, he earlier served as the 38th Defence Secretary of India. (2019–2022), Defence Production Secretary (2017–2019), and held senior roles in the Ministry of Electronics and Information Technology, where he contributed to the Digital India programme including Unified Payments Interface, Aadhaar, MyGov.in, Government e Marketplace and Jeevan Pramaan.. He is an alumnus of the IIT Kanpur and the University of Minnesota.

Kumar has been associated with significant national reforms, including defence production indigenization, the establishment of the post of Chief of Defence Staff (CDS), corporatization of the Ordnance Factories Board, and the launch of the Agniveer recruitment scheme. Beyond government service, he has engaged with academia, policy think-tanks, and startup ecosystems.

== Early life and education ==
Ajay Kumar was born in Jalandhar, Punjab. He earned his Bachelor of Technology in Electrical Engineering from the Indian Institute of Technology Kanpur. He pursued postgraduate studies in development economics and later obtained a PhD in business administration from the Carlson School of Management at the University of Minnesota. He was awarded two fellowships by the University of Minnesota and has been recognized as a distinguished alumnus by IIT Kanpur. In 2019, he was also conferred an honorary doctorate by Amity University.

== Chairperson of the Union Public Service Commission (2025–present) ==
On 13 May 2025, Kumar was appointed Chairperson of the UPSC by the President of India under Article 316(1) of the Constitution. He assumed office on 15 May 2025, with the oath administered by Lt. Gen. Raj Shukla (Retd.), the senior-most member of the Commission. As Chairperson, Kumar has been associated with efforts to modernize examination processes and incorporate technology-driven reforms.

Since assuming office, Ajay Kumar has introduced forward-leaning reforms aimed at enhancing outreach, institutional coordination, and procedural modernization at UPSC. Under his Chairperson, UPSC launched a new service in to deliver domain-specific recruitment notifications directly to universities, professional bodies, and recognized institutions.

He also spearheaded to establish a Centre of Excellence as a national repository for standard operating procedures, innovations, and best practices from UPSC and State PSCs, particularly as part of the commission's centenary celebration in 2025–26.

== Early postings ==
Kumar joined the Indian Administrative Service in 1985. He served in various capacities in the state of Kerala before being deputed to central government positions. His state assignments includes as Principal Secretary (Information Technology), managing director of the Kerala State Electronics Development Corporation, Secretary (Industries), managing director of the Kerala State Co-operative Agricultural and Rural Development Bank, general manager in the Kerala State Industrial Development Corporation and as the district magistrate and collector of the Palghat (now Palakkad) district among others.

== Ministry of Electronics and Information Technology ==
Kumar served as Additional Secretary in the Ministry of Electronics and IT and as Director General of the National Informatics Centre. He was closely associated with the implementation of the Digital India programme, including initiatives such as Unified Payments Interface, Aadhaar, MyGov.in, Government e-Marketplace, and Jeevan Pramaan. He also oversaw the creation of the Electronics Development Fund.

== Defence Production Secretary (2017–2019) ==
In December 2017, Kumar was appointed Defence Production Secretary. He advanced policies to encourage indigenization of defence manufacturing and promoted startups in defence technologies. Kumar's work involved setting up the defence startup ecosystem through the Innovations for Defence Excellence (iDEX).

== Defence Secretary of India (2019–2022) ==
Appointed as Defence Secretary in August 2019, Kumar became the longest-serving officer in that role in recent years. Key reforms during his tenure included:

- Corporatization of the 200-year-old Ordnance Factories Board into seven defence public sector undertakings.
- Establishment of the office of the Chief of Defence Staff in 2020.
- Introduction of the Agniveer scheme in 2022.
- Commissioning of Indian Coast Guard Ship Saksham and launch of INS Vagsheer, the sixth Scorpène-class submarine under Project-75.
- Policy initiatives supporting AI, drones, space technologies, and enhanced R&D in defence.

== iDEX, Indigenization, and Defence Tech Reforms (2017–2022) ==
During his tenure as Defence Production Secretary and later as Defence Secretary, Kumar played a central role in shaping India's defence innovation and indigenization ecosystem. He was instrumental in establishing the Innovations for Defence Excellence (iDEX) framework, which created a formal mechanism for startups, MSMEs, and academic institutions to collaborate with the armed forces on problem statements identified by the services. By 2022, iDEX had facilitated over 100 innovation contracts across domains such as unmanned aerial systems, secure communications, and advanced materials.

Kumar’s policy direction was closely aligned with the Atmanirbhar Bharat initiative, focusing on reducing defence import dependency and enhancing the competitiveness of domestic industry. He introduced reforms to increase private sector participation, streamline procurement procedures, and revise offset guidelines. His efforts also included improving the efficiency of Defence Public Sector Undertakings (DPSUs), linking them with research-driven projects and performance monitoring frameworks.

As Defence Secretary, he oversaw the corporatization of the 200-year-old Ordnance Factories Board into seven new DPSUs. He also supported capability development in cyber, space, and underwater warfare, while promoting increased R&D allocations to strengthen long-term technological self-reliance. Key milestones during his tenure included the commissioning of the Indian Coast Guard Ship Saksham and the launch of INS Vagsheer, the sixth Scorpène-class submarine under Project-75.

== Digital India and Innovation Initiatives ==
In his assignments with the Ministry of Electronics and Information Technology, Kumar contributed significantly to the implementation and scaling of the Digital India programme. He was closely associated with the launch and expansion of citizen-centric platforms such as MyGov, Government e-Marketplace (GeM), Jeevan Pramaan, and the integration of Aadhaar authentication into multiple service delivery frameworks.

He also initiated the Electronics Development Fund (EDF), a policy-driven venture capital support mechanism designed to strengthen India's technology startup ecosystem. The fund provided risk capital to early-stage companies and helped catalyze domestic innovation in electronics and IT hardware.

Beyond programme delivery, Kumar worked on policy frameworks for emerging technologies including artificial intelligence, drones, and space applications. His initiatives supported the creation of a more innovation-friendly ecosystem, bridging government priorities with private sector capacity and academic expertise.

== Startups, advisory and academic roles ==
Following his tenure in the Ministry of Defence, Kumar founded MGF-Kavachh, a SEBI-approved ₹250 crore venture capital fund supporting startups in defence, aerospace, and deep tech. He serves as an advisor to the board of the US-India Strategic Partnership Forum (USISPF) and sits on the board of Sify. He is also a Distinguished Visiting Professor at IIT Kanpur and a non-resident Senior Fellow at Carnegie India.

== Writing and thought leadership ==
Kumar is a regular columnist for national dailies and contributes a monthly column titled 'Off the Grid' in Business Standard, writing on governance, technology, and policy issues.

Kumar is the author of AI Nation: Bharat's Path to AI Power, a book on India's approach to artificial intelligence, computational infrastructure, cybersecurity, and information warfare. In the book, he advocates a resource-efficient "Bharat Compute Strategy" and highlights the role of AI in addressing emerging cybersecurity and misinformation challenges.

== Honours and awards ==
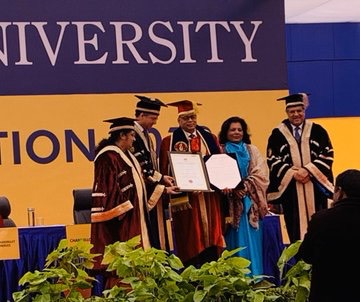
Kumar in convocation ceremony

He received distinguished Alumni award from Indian Institute of Technology Kanpur in 2019 for the entrepreneurship excellence work. Kumar oversaw the creation of an Electronics Development Fund, which focuses on developing technology start-ups in defence sector.

Ajay Kumar was named one of the top-50 effective bureaucrats in the year 2019 in a survey conducted by Asia Post for adhering to the cardinal principles of civil service that is professionalism, anonymity, integrity and neutrality.

- 1994 – Awarded the Silver Elephant medallion by the Bharat Scouts and Guides, the highest national award of the organization, in recognition of service to the scouting movement.
- 2012 – Conferred the Electronics Leader of the Year award for his contribution to the development and promotion of the electronics industry in India
- 2015 – The Technovation Sarabhai Award from the India Electronics and Semiconductor Association (IESA) for excellence in driving innovation and indigenous technology development in the electronics sector.
- 2017 – Champion of Change by the Consumer Electronics and Appliances Manufacturers Association (CEAMA) for his policy leadership and support for the Indian electronics manufacturing ecosystem.
- 2019 - Awarded Honorary Doctorate by Amity University, Noida
- 2019 - Top 50 effective bureaucrats by Asia Post
- 2019 - Distinguished Alumni, IIT Kanpur
- 2021 - Fellow of Indian National Academy of Engineering in 2021
