= G. Mohan Kumar =

Indian public official (born 1955)

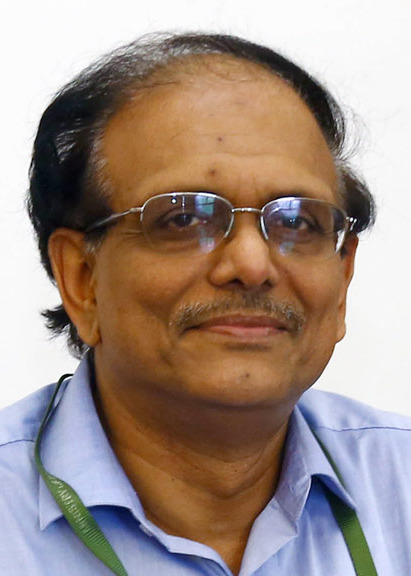
- Kumar in 2015

37th Defence Secretary of India
- In office 25 May 2015 – 24 May 2017
- Preceded by: Radha Krishna Mathur
- Succeeded by: Sanjay Mitra

37th Defence Production Secretary of India
- In office 1 September 2014 – 25 May 2015
- Preceded by: G. C. Pati
- Succeeded by: Ashok Kumar Gupta

Steel Secretary of India
- In office 3 September 2013 – 29 August 2014

Personal details
- Born: Gopinathan Nair Mohan Kumar; 27 May 1955 (age 71) Thiruvananthapuram, Kerala, India
- Spouse: Geetha
- Relations: G. Suresh Kumar (brother), Menaka (sister-in-law), Keerthy Suresh (niece)
- Children: 2
- Parent(s): M. Gopinathan Nair; Sarada
- Education: University College Thiruvananthapuram
- Occupation: Retired IAS officer

G. Mohan Kumar (IAST: Ji Mohan Kumār; born 27 May 1955) is a retired 1979 batch IAS officer of Odisha cadre. He was the Defence Secretary of India from 2015 to 2017. He also served as the Defence Production Secretary as well as the Steel Secretary of the country.

== Biography ==
Kumar was born on 27 May 1955, to M. Gopinathan Nair, retired professor of NSS College Trivandrum, and Saradamma, Mohan Kumar studied at Government Model School Trivandrum during the 1960s, did his pre-degree at Arts College Trivandrum and BSc in Chemistry at University College Trivandrum. He was selected in the civil services while doing his MSc. Initially, he was selected in the IPS and in his next attempt, he was selected in the IAS cadre in 1979 and was allotted Odisha cadre.

Kumar is married to Geetha, a gynecologist in Sree Uthradam Thirunal Hospital, Pattom, Thiruvananthapuram. The couple have two daughters. He is the elder brother of noted film actor and producer G. Suresh Kumar, brother-in-law of erstwhile actress Menaka Suresh Kumar and paternal uncle of the popular film actress Keerthy Suresh.

== Education ==
G. Mohan Kumar is a graduate (BSc) and a postgraduate (MSc) in Chemistry from University College. Kumar also has an MBA degree from the United Kingdom.

== Career ==
During the course of his career, Kumar served in various key positions for both the Union Government and the Government of Odisha, such as Principal Secretary (Fisheries and Animal Resources Development), Commissioner of Commercial Taxes, Chairman and Managing Director of Odisha State Road Transport Corporation (OSRTC), Inspector General of Registrations, Managing Director of Odisha Small Industries Corporation (OSIC), Secretary to the Governor of Odisha, Chief Executive of Odisha Renewable Energy Development Authority, Managing Director of Odisha State Seeds Corporation (OSSC), and as the District Magistrate and Collector of Sambalpur district in the Odisha Government, and as the Union Defence Secretary, Union Defence Production Secretary, Union Steel Secretary, Special Secretary in the Ministry of Water Resources and as the Chairman of the Marine Products Export Development Authority in the Government of India.

=== Steel Secretary ===
Kumar was appointed the Union Steel Secretary by the Appointments Committee of the Cabinet (ACC), he assumed office on 3 September 2013, and demitted it on 29 August 2014.

=== Defence Production Secretary ===
Kumar was appointed the Union Defence Production Secretary by the Appointments Committee of the Cabinet (ACC), he assumed office on 1 September 2014, and demitted on 25 May 2015, when he was appointed the Union Defence Secretary.

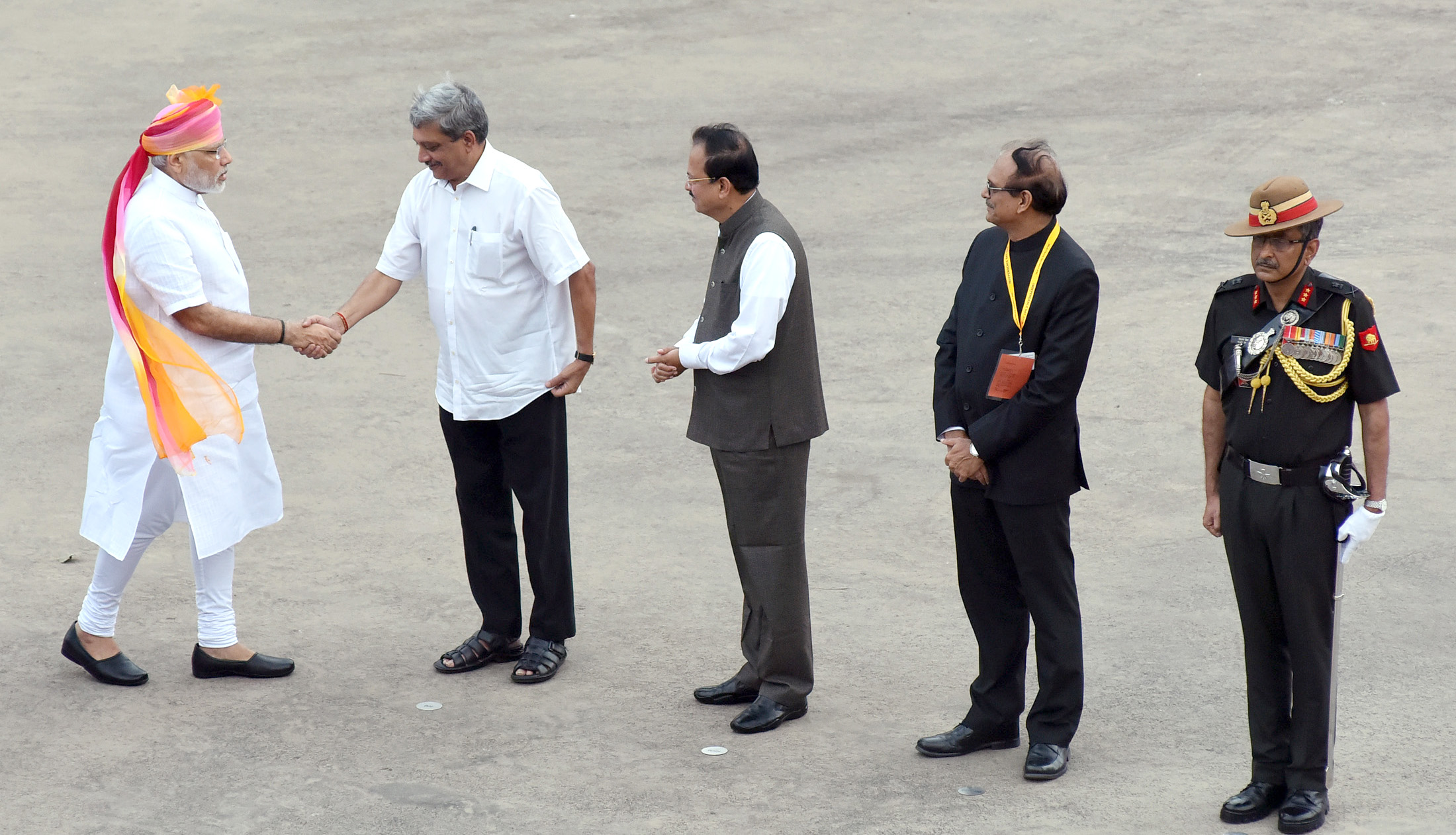
G. Mohan Kumar, Minister of Defence Manohar Parrikar and Minister of State for Defence Dr. Subhash Bhamre receiving Prime Minister of India Narendra Modi.

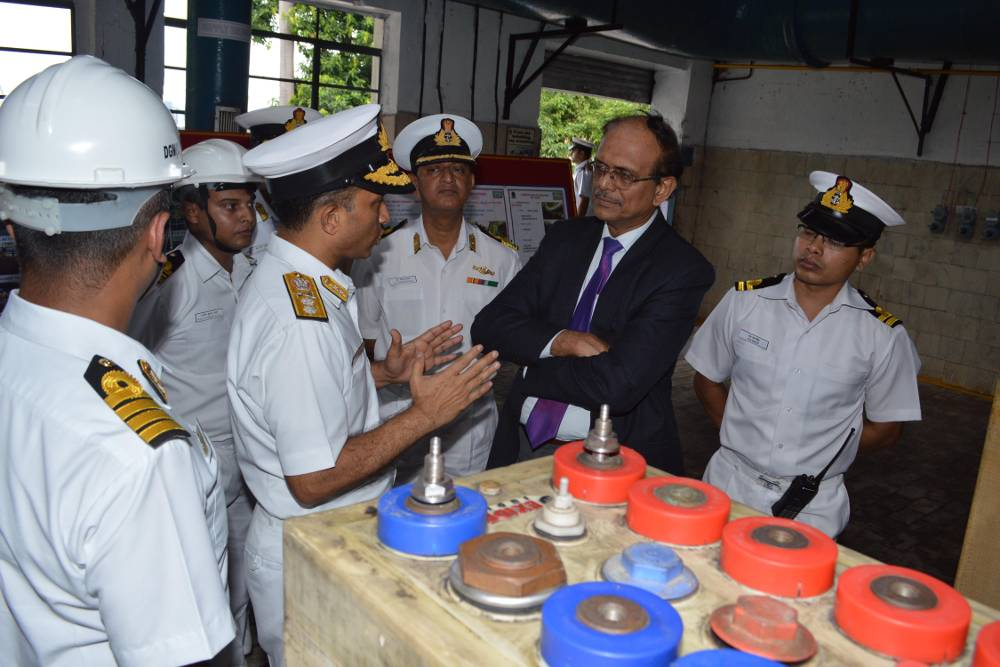
G. Mohan Kumar (second-from-right), as Defence Secretary, being briefed by the officers of Indian Navy, on his visit to INS Jalashwa.

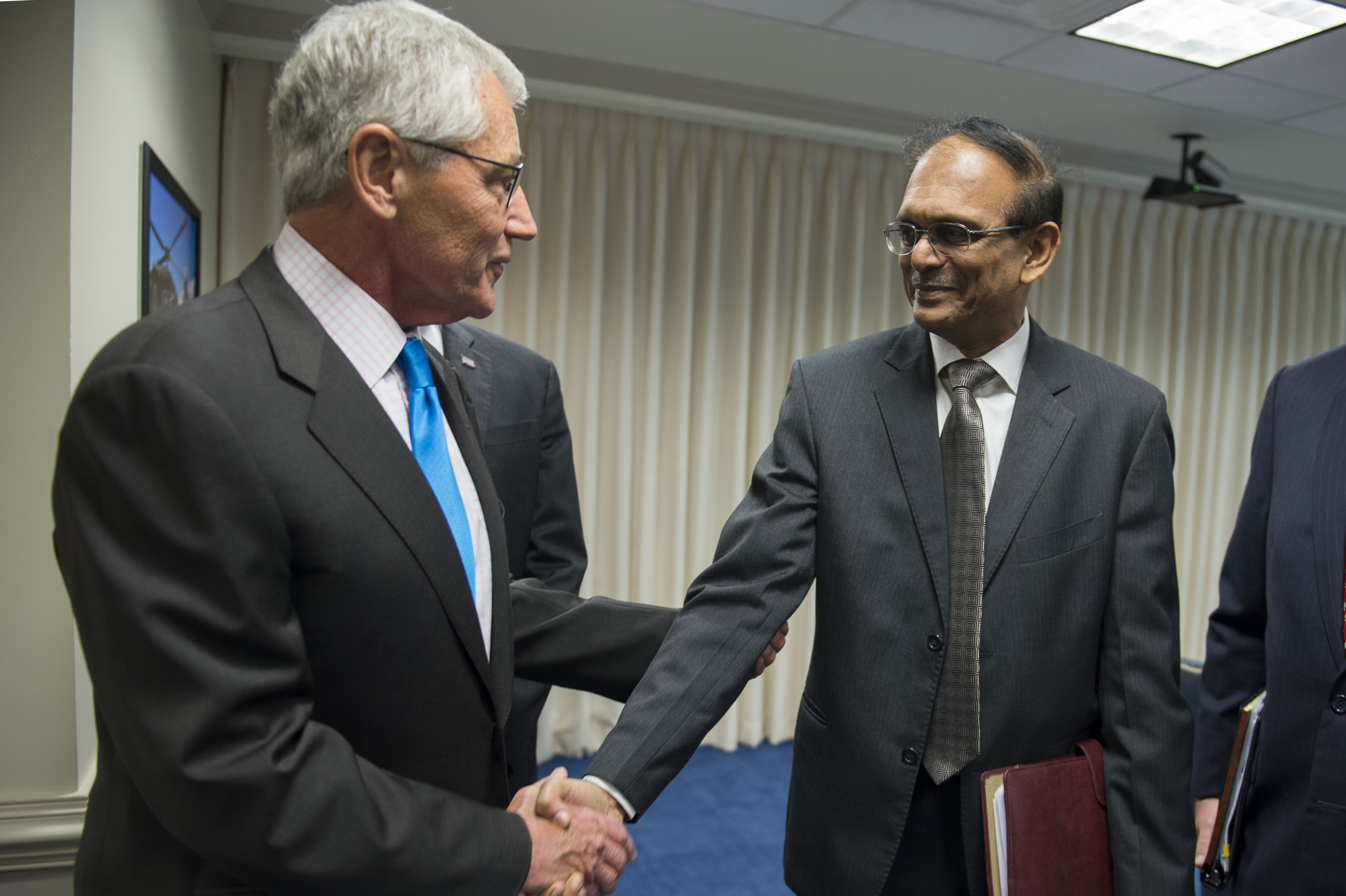
G. Mohan Kumar with the then United States Secretary of Defense Chuck Hagel in September 2014.

=== Defence Secretary ===
Kumar was appointed the Union Defence Secretary by the Appointments Committee of the Cabinet (ACC) in May 2015, he assumed the office of Defence Secretary on 25 May 2015, and demitted it and simultaneously superannuated from service on 24 May 2017.
