= Harish Chandra Sarin =

Indian civil servant (1914–1997)

- Born: 27 May 1914; Deoria, United Provinces of Agra and Oudh, British India
- Died: 27 January 1997 (aged 82); New Delhi, India
- Education: Emmanuel College, University of Cambridge
- Occupations: Civil servant, writer
- Known for: Defence Secretary (India)
- Spouse: Pushpa Sarin
- Awards: 1974 Padma Vibhushan; 1993 IMF Award

Harish Chandra Sarin (1914–1997) was an Indian civil servant, writer and the defence secretary of India. He assumed office on 3 November 1968 and held the position until 7 December 1970. He was the author of the book, Defence and Development.

Sarin was born on 27 May 1914 at Deoria in the Indian state of Uttar Pradesh and was an alumnus of Cambridge University. He held the position of the Defence Secretary past his retirement age. The Government of India awarded him the Padma Vibhushan, the second highest Indian civilian award, in 1967. He was also a recipient of the First Special IMF Award of the Indian Mountaineering Foundation in 1993. Sarin, who was married to Pushpa Rathore, died on 27 January 1997.

== See also ==
- K.B. Lall
- P. V. R. Rao

Preceded by V. Shankar	Defence Secretary (India); 1968–1970	Succeeded by K.B. Lall
