= Naresh Chandra =

Indian civil servant

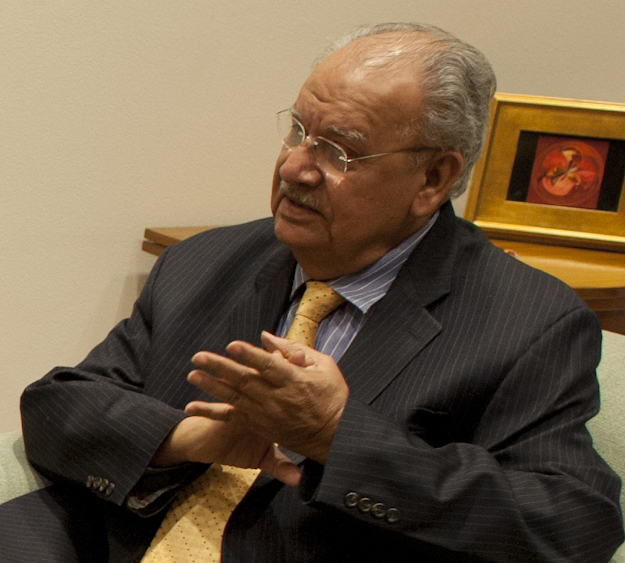

Indian Ambassador to the United States
- In office 1996–2001
- President: Shankar Dayal Sharma; K. R. Narayanan
- Preceded by: Siddhartha Shankar Ray
- Succeeded by: Lalit Mansingh

13th Governor of Gujarat
- In office 1 July 1995 – 1 March 1996
- President: Shankar Dayal Sharma
- Preceded by: Sarup Singh
- Succeeded by: Krishna Pal Singh

20th Cabinet Secretary of India
- In office 11 December 1990 – 31 July 1992
- President: Ramaswamy Venkataraman
- Preceded by: V. C. Pande
- Succeeded by: S. Rajagopal

Home Secretary of India
- In office 21 March 1990 – 11 December 1990

22nd Defence Secretary of India
- In office 22 February 1989 – 21 March 1990
- Preceded by: T.N. Sheshan
- Succeeded by: N.N. Vohra

Water Resources Secretary of India
- In office 1 February 1987 – 1 February 1989

Personal details
- Born: 1 August 1934 Allahabad, United Provinces, British India
- Died: 9 July 2017 (aged 82) Panaji, Goa, India
- Cause of death: Multiple organ failure
- Education: Allahabad University
- Occupation: Retired IAS officer
- Awards: Padma Vibhushan (2007)

Naresh Chandra (1 August 1934 – 9 July 2017) was a 1956th batch Indian Administrative Service officer of the Rajasthan cadre who served as the Cabinet Secretary of India, Defence Secretary of India, Home Secretary of India, Water Resources Secretary of India and Indian Ambassador to the United States. He was awarded India's second highest civilian honour the Padma Vibhushan for civil service in 2007.

== Early life ==
Chandra was educated in Allahabad and obtained a postgraduate degree (MSc) in Maths from the Allahabad University.

== Career ==
=== Early career ===
Naresh Chandra served as a lecturer in the Allahabad University before his selection as an Indian Administrative Service (IAS) officer.

=== Indian Administrative Service ===
Naresh Chandra served in various key capacities for both the Government of Rajasthan and the Union Government, including as the Chief Secretary of Rajasthan, Commissioner and Secretary (Finance), Secretary (Industries) and Chairman of Rajasthan Electricity Board, and as the District Magistrate and Collector of Jodhpur, Jhunjhunu and Bharatpur districts in the Government of Rajasthan, and as the Cabinet Secretary of India, Union Home Secretary, Union Defence Secretary, Union Water Resources Secretary, Joint Secretary in the Department of Heavy Industries of the Ministry of Heavy Industries and Public Enterprises, Director in the secretariat of Third Central Pay Commission, Deputy Secretary in the secretariat of Administrative Reforms Commission and as a Deputy Secretary in the Ministry of Agriculture in the Union Government.

Naresh Chandra also served as an Adviser to the Governor of Jammu and Kashmir in 1986 for a duration of eight months. Chandra also served as Adviser (Export Industrialization and Policy) for the Commonwealth Secretariat in Colombo, Sri Lanka.

Post his superannuation from the service as the Cabinet Secretary of India, Chandra was appointed a Senior Adviser in the Prime Minister's Office (PMO), and hence was deemed to have been reemployed into the IAS.

==== Chief Secretary of Rajasthan ====
Chandra was appointed the Chief Secretary of Rajasthan by the Chief Minister of Rajasthan, he assumed the office of the Chief Secretary on 22 July 1985, and demitted on 9 March 1986.

==== Water Resources Secretary of India ====
Chandra was appointed the Union Water Resources Secretary by the Appointments Committee of the Cabinet (ACC), he assumed the office on 1 February 1987, and demitted it on 1 February 1989, after serving for two years.

==== Defence Secretary of India ====
Chandra was appointed the Union Defence Secretary by the Appointments Committee of the Cabinet (ACC), he assumed the office of the Defence Secretary on 1 February 1989, and demitted it on 1 March 1990.

==== Home Secretary of India ====
Chandra was appointed the Union Home Secretary by the Appointments Committee of the Cabinet (ACC), he assumed the office of the Home Secretary on 1 March 1990, and demitted it on 1 December 1990.

==== Cabinet Secretary of India ====
Chandra was appointed the Union Cabinet Secretary by the Appointments Committee of the Cabinet (ACC), he assumed office of the Cabinet Secretary on 1 December 1990, and demitted it and simultaneously superannuated from service on 31 July 1992.

As the Cabinet Secretary, Chandra was incharge and coordinator of India's nuclear programme, Shekhar Gupta described him as the "Keeper of India's family silver".

=== After IAS ===
==== Governor of Gujarat ====
After his tenure in the PMO, Chandra was appointed the Governor of Gujarat by the President of India, he assumed the office of Governor on 1 July 1995 and demitted it on 1 March 1996.

==== Ambassador of India to the United States of America ====
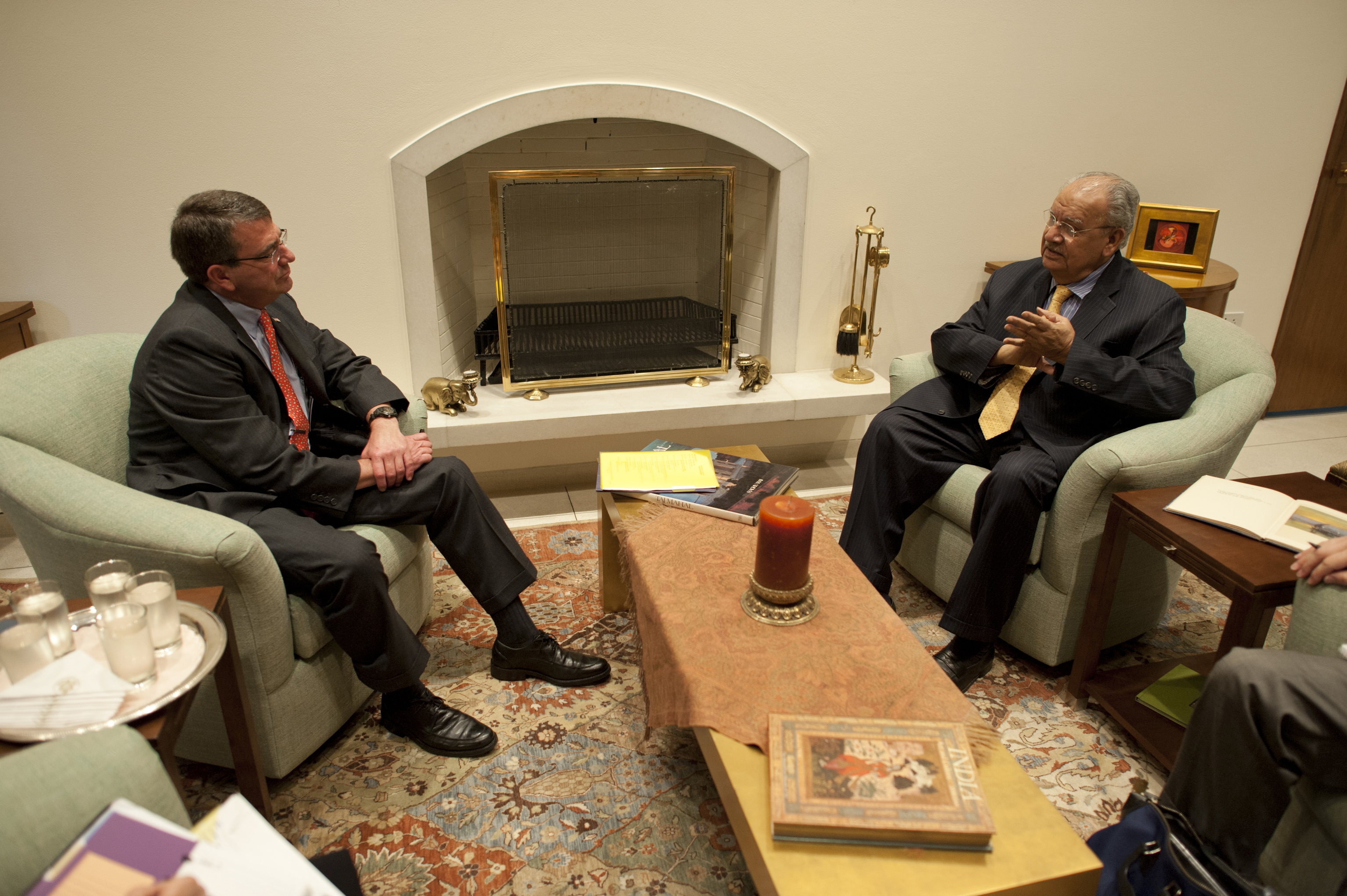
Naresh Chandra in Delhi on 23 July 2012.

Chandra was appointed the Indian Ambassador to the United States by the Prime Minister of India in 1996, he was confirmed to the diplomatic position by the President of the United States of America in 1996, he remained as the Ambassador of India to the United States till 2001.

Chandra's long official association with the United States spans more than three decades, beginning with his first visit to this country in 1963–64. He has been the Indian Co-chairman of the US-India Technology Group, and Member of the Indo-US Economic Sub-Commission, which lent him valuable insight into the broad range of Indo-US relations. Following the economic liberalisation program in India, he led the first official delegation to the US in 1992 to promote US investments in India. He has been deeply involved in several important conferences organised subsequently in the US by business development groups.

==== Post Ambassadorship ====
The government approved of setting up of Serious Fraud Investigation Office (SFIO) on 9 January 2003, on the basis of recommendations made by the Naresh Chandra Committee which was set up by the government on 21 August 2002 on Corporate Governance. He also chaired the Confederation of Indian Industry (CII) Task Force on Corporate Governance which submitted its report in November 2009 for voluntary adoption by listed companies and wholly owned subsidiaries of listed companies in India.

== His work in his words ==
‘Living in interesting times’ is how I would describe my tenure here. Something or the other has always been happening. There was a lot of interaction on the Comprehensive Test Ban Treaty when I first arrived here. 1997 was a ‘feel good’ time – we were celebrating 50 years of Independence - there were series of functions and events – in fact we had more functions in the U.S. than in India. The major challenge came in May 1998 - dealing with the nuclear test. I remember going from one studio to another – TV, radio, and press – in addition to dozens of meetings in the Senate and the Congress. That was the most difficult and a very challenging period of my tenure here. Then began the rounds of discussions between Indian delegation, led by Jaswant Singh, and the U.S. delegation led by Talbot. I was present in every meeting and throughout. We saw the scene develop from a very tense dialogue into a very friendly and frank exchange of views. This brought me about stability and progress in a positive direction in our relations with the U.S.'

The Prime Minister's visit in September 1998 was also an important one. It dissipated the demonising of India that had gone on before his arrival. People saw him and heard him speak. His statement that "India and the U.S. can be natural allies in the 21st century" struck a chord in the U.S. administration. President Clinton's visit to India and then the return visit of the Indian Prime Minister put a feel on it. I witnessed a very fine chapter in the Indo-U.S. relations.

A specific instance that I will remember of my tenure, is the establishment of Gandhi Memorial - Mahatma Gandhi's statue – in front of our Chancery building in Washington DC – and the way it was accomplished against heavy odds. We were able to have it up just in time to have it dedicated by the Prime Minister of India in the presence of the president of the United States on 16 September 2000. It was a great moment – for South Asians and Americans. I also received many messages from our friends in Pakistan – and the Pakistan Ambassador congratulated me and expressed her happiness at the establishment of the statue.

== Death ==
Chandra died at a hospital in Panaji, Goa, India. Due to multiple organ failure on 9 July 2017 at the age of 82.

== Awards and recognition ==
- Chandra was conferred the Padma Vibhushan, India's second highest civilian honour, for civil service, in 2007.

Political offices
| Preceded by Siddhartha Shankar Ray | Indian Ambassador to the United States; 1996–2001 | Succeeded by Lalit Mansingh |
