= Rajiv Lall =

- Born: 2 August 1957 (age 69)
- Education: Columbia University and Oxford University
- Occupation: Part time Non-Exe Chairman of IDFC First Bank
- Spouse: Bunty Chand
- Parent: K.B. Lall

Rajiv B. Lall is an Indian financier and political economist who was the CEO and chairman of the Infrastructure Development Finance Company (IDFC) in India. His father K.B. Lall was a member of Indian Civil Service.

== Early life and education ==
Lall was born on 2 August 1957. He acquired a B.A. (Hons) degree in politics, philosophy, and economics from the Oxford University and Ph.D. in economics from Columbia University. He is conversant in French and can Spanish and Mandarin. Lall resides in Mumbai, and is married to Bunty Chand, the executive director of the Indian chapter of the John Rockefeller-founded Asia Society. He also has a home in Singapore.

== Career ==
Before joining Warburg Pincus in 1997, Rajiv Lall was the Head of Asian Economic Research with Morgan Stanley Asia.

In 2005, Lall joined IDFC as MD and CEO. he is a director of IDFC Trustee Company Pvt. Ltd., IDFC Capital Company Limited, IDFC Projects Limited, IDFC-SSKI Securities Limited, IDFC-SSKI Limited, IDFC Bank, STCI Finance Limited, National Stock Exchange of India Limited, Spandana Sphoorty Finance Limited, Delhi Integrated Multi-Modal Transit System Limited, Qualitas Healthcare, and IDFC Private Equity.

Lall founded and launched IDFC Bank in 2015 and later led the acquisition of Grama Vidyal, Tamil Nadu’s largest microfinance company, in a first-of-its-kind transaction to integrate microfinance into mainstream banking. IDFC Bank’s rural business came to be known as Bharat Banking, which delivered full-service banking tools to bottom-of-the-pyramid customers using new technology solutions that relied on micro-ATMs to acquire and manage customers. To secure the Bank’s future, he then engineered the acquisition of Capital First to create IDFC First Bank. He relinquished his role as CEO to complete the organisational transformation to a full-service retail bank under new leadership. He stepped down in 2021 to return to academia. At Singapore Management University, he focuses on climate finance, energy transition, and environment and health-related issues.

During his career spanning over two decades, he was worked with the World Bank, Warburg Pincus, Morgan Stanley and Asian Development Bank. He was also an assistant professor at Florida Atlantic University. After leaving Warburg Pincus, he played a pioneering role in create the Indian impact investment ecosystem founding Lok Capital in 2005 and mentoring it and many impact entrepreneurs until 2015.

During Lall's tenure, IDFC became India’s biggest infrastructure finance company with balance sheet worth more than ₨ 60,000 crore.

== Social interests ==
Lok Foundation, along with Lok Capital Group, provides social venture capital to promote social entrepreneurship in education, healthcare and low-cost housing segments.
