= Govind Narain =

Indian civil servant (1916–2012)

3rd Governor of Karnataka
- In office 2 August 1977 – 15 April 1983
- Preceded by: Uma Shankar Dikshit
- Succeeded by: A. N. Banerji

11th Defence Secretary of India
- In office 19 May 1973 – 31 May 1975
- Preceded by: K. B. Lall
- Succeeded by: D. R. Kohli

7th Home Secretary of India
- In office 1 January 1971 – 18 May 1973
- Preceded by: Lallan Prasad Singh
- Succeeded by: Nirmal Kumar Mukarji

Personal details
- Born: 5 May 1916 Mainpuri, British Raj
- Died: 3 April 2012 (aged 95) New Delhi, India

Govind Narain, ICS (5 May 1916 – 3 April 2012) was an Indian civil servant who was member of the Indian Civil Service and served as the 3rd Governor of Karnataka.

He formerly served as Defence Secretary of India (1973 to 1975), Home Secretary of India (1971 to 1973) and the Chief Secretary of Uttar Pradesh (1958 to 1961). He is believed to be one of India's most senior and respected civil servants.

He also served as Adviser and Secretary to the King of Nepal from 1951 to 1954.

== Early childhood and education ==
He was born into a Kayastha family in Mainpuri, Uttar Pradesh and educated at the University of Allahabad and University of Oxford.

== Career ==
He was selected as a member of the Indian Civil Service in 1939 and served as District Collector of Farrukhabad and Aligarh.

=== Ministry of Defence ===
He served as 11th Defence Secretary of India (1973 to 1975) and also as Secretary to the Government of India in Department of Defence Production (DDP) from 1968 to 1970.

=== Ministry of Home Affairs ===
As Home Secretary, he played a crucial role during the Indo-Pakistani War of 1971. He then became Defence Secretary, a post he occupied between 1973 and 1975. He was also chief secretary of Uttar Pradesh, and was deputised to build relations between India and Nepal in 1951 as Adviser to the King of Nepal.

=== Ministry of Health ===
He served as Secretary to the Government of India in Ministry of Health and Family Welfare from 1966 to 1968.

=== Others ===
After retirement, he was affiliated with the Public Interest Legal Support and Research Trust, Shankara Vidya Kendra, Federation of Indo-German Society in India, and an NGO, Common Cause.

== Political career ==
He was named Governor of Karnataka and held the post between 1977 and 1983. He was awarded the Padma Vibhushan in 2009.
