= Sanjay Mitra (civil servant) =

Indian civil servant (IAS officer) (born 1959)

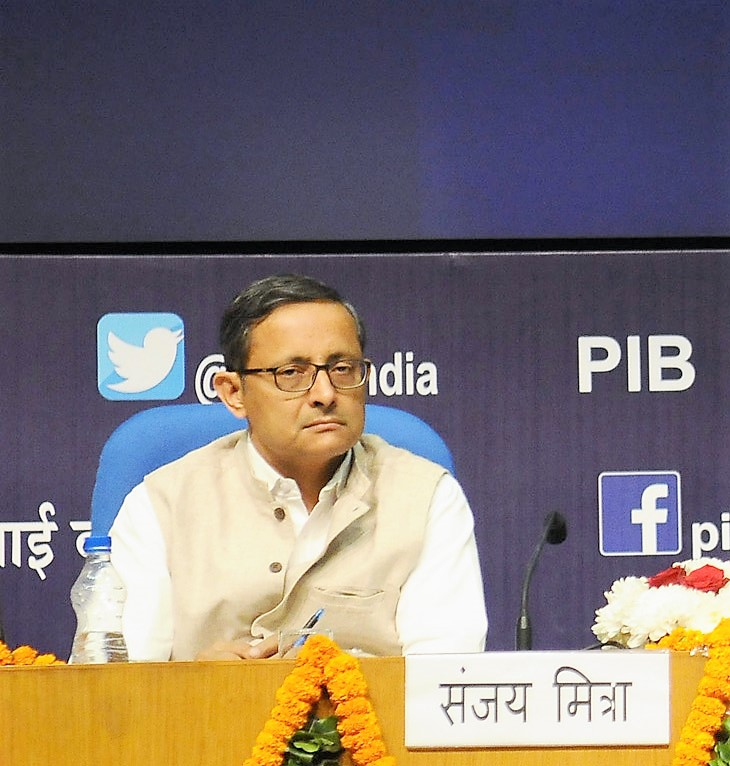
- Mitra addressing a press conference in November 2016

38th Defence Secretary of India
- In office 25 May 2017 – 23 August 2019
- Preceded by: G. Mohan Kumar
- Succeeded by: Ajay Kumar

Chairman of the Defence Research and Development Organisation Acting
- In office 29 May 2018 – 25 August 2018
- Preceded by: S Christopher
- Succeeded by: G. Satheesh Reddy

Road Transport and Highways Secretary of India
- In office 1 January 2016 – 10 May 2017
- Preceded by: Vijay Chibber
- Succeeded by: Rajive Kumar (acting); Yudhvir Malik

Chief Secretary of West Bengal
- In office 30 September 2012 – 27 December 2015
- Preceded by: Samar Ghosh
- Succeeded by: Basudev Banerjee

Personal details
- Born: Sanjay Mitra; 6 May 1959 (age 67) Delhi, India
- Education: (BSc) Delhi University (MPA)Harvard University
- Profession: Civil servant

Sanjay Mitra (born 6 May 1959) is a retired 1982 batch Indian Administrative Service officer of West Bengal cadre. He served as Defence Secretary of India, and prior to that as Union Road Transport and Highways Secretary, and the Chief Secretary of West Bengal. Mitra also served—on an acting basis—as the chairperson of the Defence Research and Development Organisation for a period of three months.

== Education ==
Mitra holds Bachelor of Science and Master of Science degrees in physics, a postgraduate degree in economics, and a Master of Public Administration in public administration from the John F. Kennedy School of Government at Harvard University.

== Career ==
Mitra has served in various positions for both the Government of India and the Government of West Bengal, such as the Chief Secretary of West Bengal, Principal Secretary (Health and Family Welfare), chairman and managing director of the Grid Corporation of Odisha, chairperson and managing director of the Orissa Thermal Power Corporation (on deputation to Odisha cadre), Resident Commissioner of West Bengal and as the district magistrate and collector of the North 24 Parganas district in the West Bengal government, and as the Union Road Transport Secretary, joint secretary in the Prime Minister's Office and as a deputy secretary in the Ministry of Rural Development in the Indian government.

Mitra also served as a consultant to the United Nations Development Programme.

=== Chief Secretary of West Bengal ===
Mitra was appointed the Chief Secretary of West Bengal by the Chief Minister of West Bengal in September 2012. He assumed the office of the chief secretary of the state on 30 September 2012 and demitted it on 27 December 2015, after being the state's top bureaucrat for three years.

=== Road Transport and Highway Secretary ===
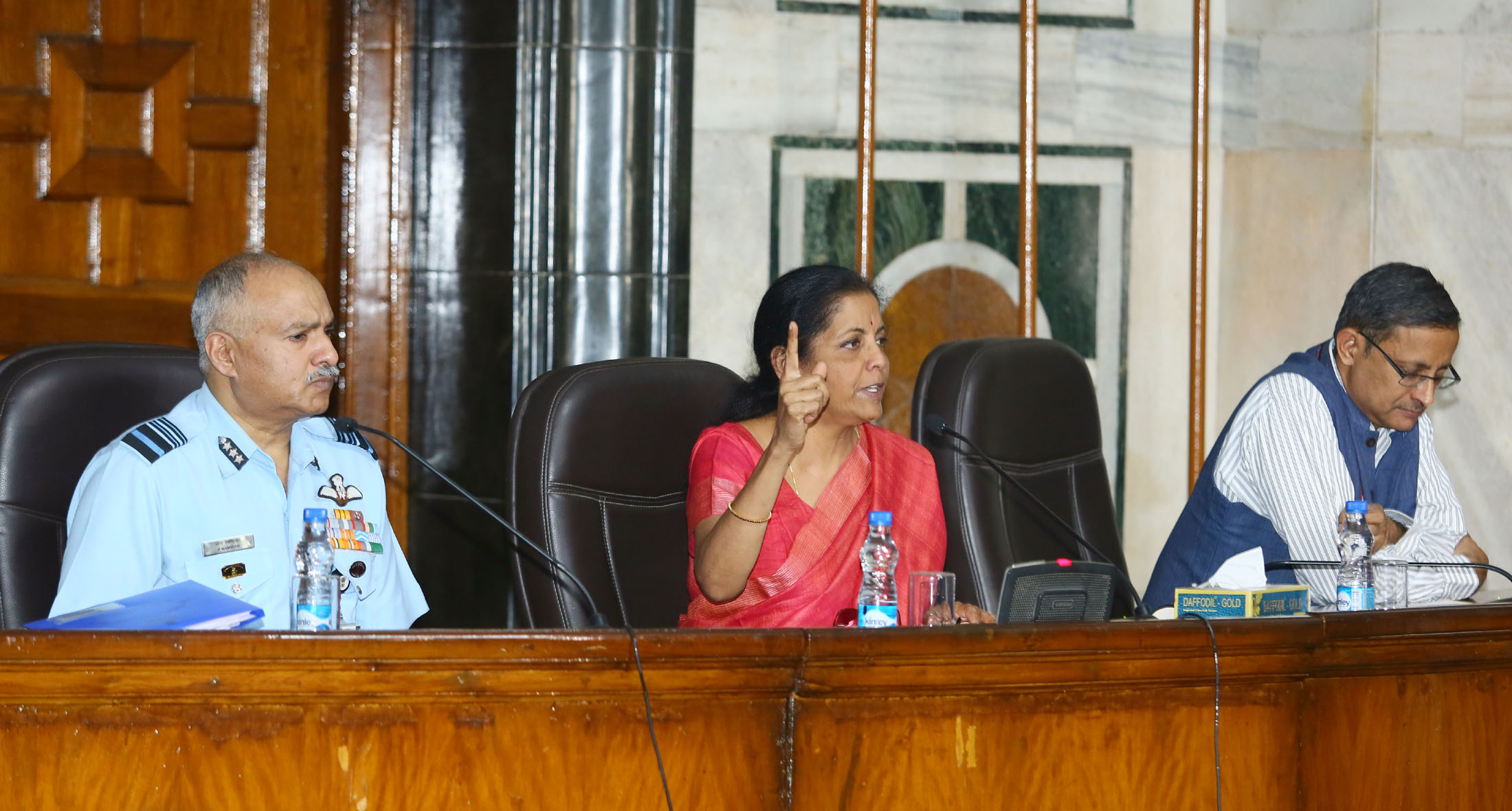
Mitra (right) in a press conference with Minister of Defence, Nirmala Sitharaman

Mitra was appointed the Union Road Transport and Highways Secretary by the Appointments Committee of the Cabinet (ACC) in December 2015, he assumed the office on 1 January 2016 and demitted it on 10 May 2017.

=== Defence Secretary ===
Mitra was appointed the Union Defence Secretary by the ACC in May 2017, succeeding G. Mohan Kumar. Mitra served as an officer on special duty, in the rank of secretary, till Kumar's retirement, he formally took charge on 25 May 2017.

Mitra retired on 23 August 2019, and was succeeded by Ajay Kumar.

=== Post-retirement ===
After retiring from the IAS, Mitra became a professor of practice at the School of Public Policy at Indian Institute of Technology, Delhi.
