= Giridhar Aramane =

39th Defence Secretary of India

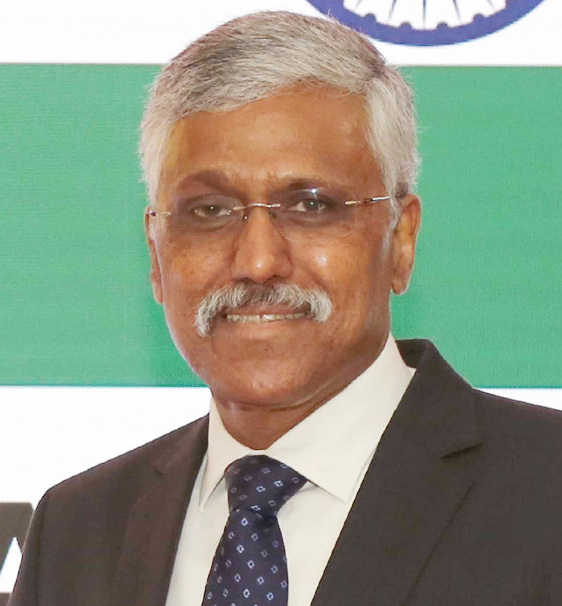

39th Defence Secretary of India
- In office 31 October 2022 – 31 October 2024
- Appointed by: Appointments Committee of the Cabinet
- Preceded by: Ajay Kumar
- Succeeded by: Rajesh Kumar Singh

Secretary of Ministry of Road Transport and Highway
- In office 1 May 2020 – 31 October 2022
- Appointed by: Appointments Committee of the Cabinet
- Preceded by: Sanjeev Ranjan
- Succeeded by: Alka Upadhyaya

Personal details
- Born: 12 June 1963 (age 63) Kurnool, Andhra Pradesh, India
- Spouse: Gayatri Aramane
- Education: JNTU, Hyderabad; IITM; Kakatiya University
- Occupation: IAS officer
- Profession: Civil servant

Giridhar Aramane (born 12 June 1963) is a retired 1988 Indian Administrative Service (IAS) officer from Andhra Pradesh cadre, who served as the 39th Defence Secretary of India a position he has held from 31 October 2022 until 31 October 2024. Currently he is serving as Chairman and Managing Director (CMD) of Unitech Group from August 2026 onwards.

== Early life and education ==
Aramane was born in 1963 in Kurnool of Andhra Pradesh, India.

He completed his B.Tech. in Civil Engineering from Jawaharlal Nehru Technological University, Hyderabad, and his M.Tech. from IIT Madras. He also holds an M.A. (Economics) from Kakatiya University, Warangal.

== Career ==
Aramane has held many government posts in his career. He previously served as Secretary in Ministry of Road Transport and Highways and Aramane has served as 39th Defence Secretary of India from 1 November 2022 until 31 October 2024.

In Andhra Pradesh Government, he held the role of Additional Secretary in the Cabinet Secretariat and he looks at the Exploration Division in the Ministry of Petroleum & Natural Gas and was Executive Director in-charge of inspections in Insurance Regulatory & Development Authority.
