= P. V. R. Rao =

Indian civil servant and writer

- Born: India
- Occupations: Civil servant, writer
- Known for: Defence Secretary (India)
- Awards: Padma Vibhushan

Pattadakal Venkanna Raghavendra Rao was an Indian civil servant, writer and the sixth defence secretary of India. He assumed office on 21 November 1962, the day the Sino-Indian War ended and held the position until 3 April 1965. He was the author of three books, India's Defence Policy and Organisation Since Independence, Defence without drift and Red Tape and White Cap. The Government of India awarded him the Padma Vibhushan, the second highest Indian civilian award, in 1967.

== See also ==
- Govind Narain
- K.B. Lall

Preceded by O. Pulla Reddy	Defence Secretary (India); 1962–1965	Succeeded by A. D. Pandit
