= Arunachal Dragon Force =

The Arunachal Dragon Force (ADF), also known as the East India Liberation Front, was a violent secessionist movement in the eastern state of Arunachal Pradesh. The ADF sought to create an independent sovereign state resembling the British Teola Country, which would include areas currently in Arunachal Pradesh as well as neighboring Assam.

== See also ==
- Insurgent groups in Northeast India
- Insurgency in North-East India
- Gorkha National Liberation Front
- Compact Revolutionary Zone
