= PILSARC =

Non-Profit Legal Back-up Centre

PILSARC's official logo

The Public Interest Legal Support and Research Centre (PILSARC) is a non-profit legal back-up centre based in New Delhi. It provides coordinated institutional support and solutions in the various fields of human rights, civil liberties, governance and social justice.

PILSARC works pro bono, relying on grants and supportive financing for its continued existence as a public interest law firm to be selectively used by persons working around issues of social justice, non-governmental organisations, human rights institutions and others. PILSARC also works to provide legal research and theoretical analyses for public interest litigations and social action campaigns. An important component of PILSARC's legal aid and support is focused on strategic interventions on the basis of its expertise in specialised areas through documentation, litigation support, legal advice and public advocacy. The office includes a special unit on refugee law, and is an implementing partner of the United Nations High Commissioner for Refugees in New Delhi.
