= Jeevan Pramaan =

Indian digital person identifier

- Country: India
- Prime Minister(s): Narendra Modi
- Launched: 10 November 2014; 12 years ago

Jeevan Pramaan is an Indian Life Certificate program affiliated with Aadhaar for people with pensions. It was started by Prime Minister Narendra Modi on 10 November 2014.

The certificate was made for people who receive pensions from central or state governments or other government organisations.

Jeevan Pramaan was made by the Department of Electronics and IT, Government of India.

The Jeevan Pramaan software can be downloaded from https://jeevanpramaan.gov.in/ & from the Google Play Store for both PC and Android devices. This procedure can also be completed in one of the several Jeevan Pramaan Centres. A pension recipient can receive an electronic Jeevan Praaman certificate by using this software and a fingerprint or iris scan, as well as the Aadhaar platform for identification. The certificate can then be made available electronically to the Pension Disbursing Agency.

In 2026, the Department of Posts began offering the certificate at pensioners' homes, with postmen visiting to complete the process using fingerprint or face authentication for a fee of ₹70.

== No of beneficiaries year wise ==
Si.No	Year	No. of beneficiaries
1	2014	109751
2	2015	1315150
3	2016	5058451
4	2017	9901542
5	2018	8994834
6	2019	9965509
7	2020	9897459
8	2021	11191451
9	2022	14129489
10	2023*	11775322
11	2024	
