= S. K. Bhatnagar =

Indian politician

Sharad Kumar Bhatnagar

Governor of Sikkim
- In office 2 March 1989 – 7 February 1990
- Appointed by: Ramaswamy Venkataraman
- Prime Minister: Rajiv Gandhi; V. P. Singh
- Chief Minister: Nar Bahadur Bhandari
- Preceded by: T. V. Rajeswar
- Succeeded by: Radhakrishna Hariram Tahiliani

Ambassador of India to Portugal
- In office 6 August 1996 – 30 November 2000
- Preceded by: Surendra Kumar Arora
- Succeeded by: Madhu Bhaduri

Ambassador of India to Bahrain
- In office January 1983 – July 1986
- Preceded by: es:Prem Singh
- Succeeded by: M.P.M. Menon

Union Defence Secretary
- In office 6 July 1984 – 31 May 1988
- Preceded by: S. M. Ghosh
- Succeeded by: T. N. Seshan

Union Industrial Development Secretary
- In office 1 September 1983 – 1 July 1984
- Minister: N. D. Tiwari

Personal details
- Born: 1 June 1930
- Died: 4 August 2001 (aged 71)

S. K. Bhatnagar (June 1, 1930 – August 4, 2001) was a former defence secretary of India. He was a key figure of those accused in the Bofors scandal.

He was one of the persons to have been questioned first by the CBI after registering the First Information Report (FIR) in the Bofors pay- off case in January 1990. He was accused of abusing his official authority as the then Defence Secretary to tilt the scales in favour of the Swedish firm for the Rs. 1437-crore contract to supply 155 mm howitzer guns to the Indian Army. The contract with the Government was signed on March 24, 1986, when Rajiv Gandhi was the Prime Minister of India.

He was later made governor of Sikkim.

He died in 2001 at the age of 71.
