= Shekhar Dutt =

Indian civil servant (1945–2025)

Shekhar Dutt SM
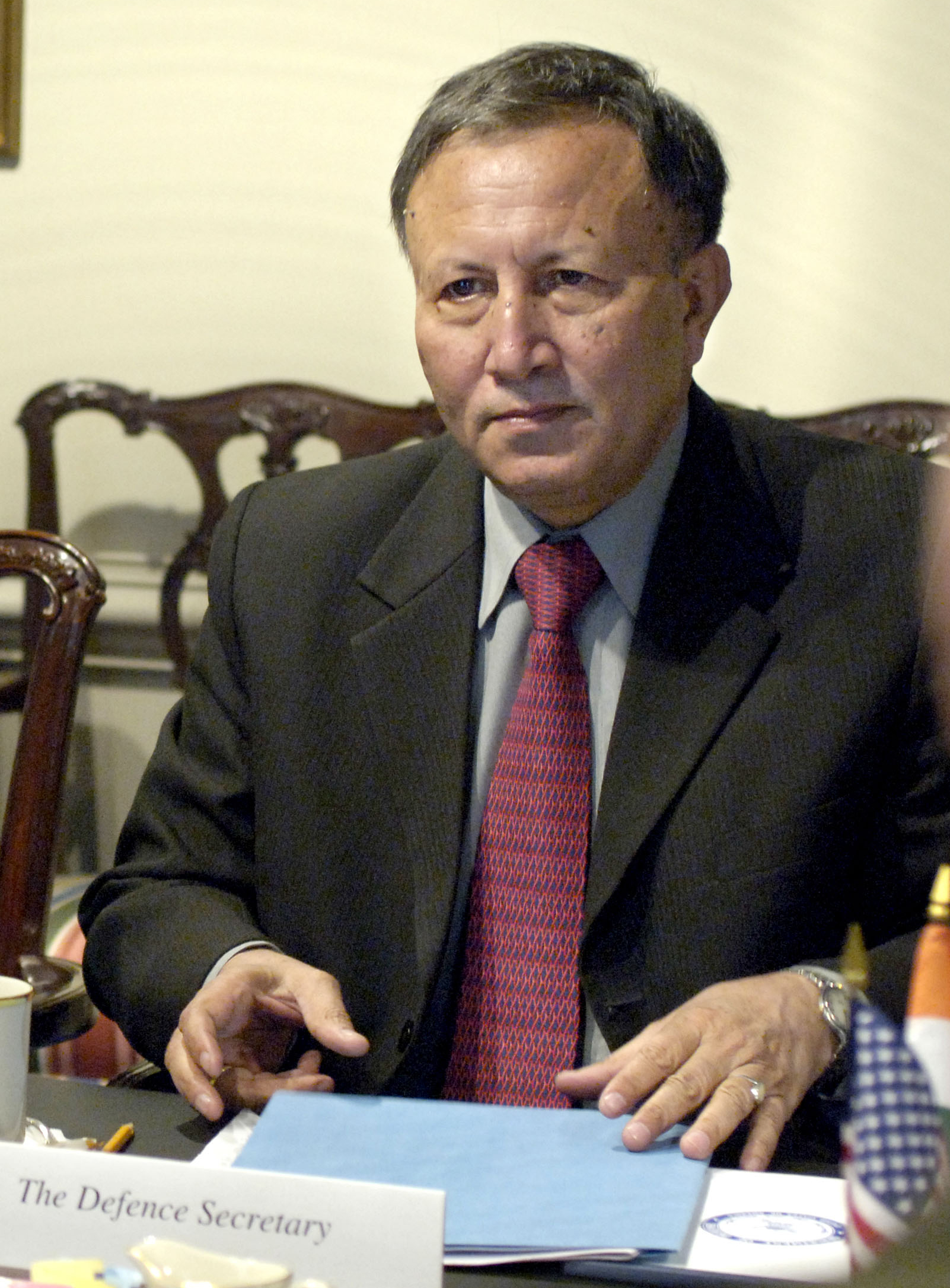

4th Governor of Chhattisgarh
- In office 23 January 2010 – 19 June 2014
- Chief Minister: Raman Singh
- Preceded by: E. S. L. Narasimhan
- Succeeded by: Ram Naresh Yadav (Acting)

Deputy National Security Advisor of India
- In office 27 July 2007 – 2009
- Prime Minister: Manmohan Singh

31st Defence Secretary of India
- In office 29 July 2005 – 31 July 2007
- Prime Minister: Manmohan Singh
- Preceded by: Ajai Vikram Singh
- Succeeded by: Vijay Singh

Personal details
- Born: 20 December 1945
- Died: 2 July 2025 (aged 79) New Delhi, India
- Education: Swansea University
- Website: www.shekhardutt.in

Military service
- Allegiance: India
- Branch/service: Indian Army
- Years of service: 1970–1971
- Rank: India: Short Service Commissioned Officer
- Battles/wars: Indo-Pakistani War of 1971

Shekhar Dutt (20 December 1945 – 2 July 2025) was an Indian civil servant who served as governor of the Indian state of Chhattisgarh. Earlier, he had served on various bureaucratic posts including as an IAS officer and as Secretary in the Ministry of Defence of the Government of India.

== Career ==
Dutt belonged to the 1969 batch of IAS from the Madhya Pradesh cadre. Dutt became a short service commission officer in the Indian Army. He was awarded the Sena Medal for gallantry while serving with 218 Medium Regiment during the Indo-Pakistani War of 1971. He held various posts in the Madhya Pradesh government, including Principal Secretary in the Department of Tribal and Scheduled Caste Welfare and Principal Secretary, Departments of School Education, Sports and Youth Welfare.

Dutt was appointed Secretary of the Department of Ayurveda, Yoga, Naturopathy, Unani, Siddha & Homeopathy in the Ministry of Health and Family Welfare of India. As Director General of the Sports Authority of India, Dutt played a role in the hosting of the Afro-Asian Games in Hyderabad, India in November 2003.

He eventually became the Joint Secretary in the Department of Defence Production and later took over as the Defence Secretary of India in 2005. In July 2007, Dutt retired as Defence Secretary and was appointed Deputy National Security Adviser for a two-year term.

In September 2009, Dutt was named to the board of trustees of DeSales University.

On 23 January 2010, he assumed the office of the Governor of Chhattisgarh, the post in which he served till his resignation on 18 June 2014.

== Death ==
Dutt died at a hospital in New Delhi, on 2 July 2025, at the age of 79.

== Honours and awards ==
- Wales United Kingdom Honorary degree and Fellow of Swansea University 2018
- Sena Medal

== Book ==
"Reflections on Contemporary India" written by Shri Shekhar Dutt and launched by the President of India on 11-Feb-2014.

Government offices
Preceded by E. S. L. Narasimhan	Governor of Chhattisgarh; 23 January 2010 - 19 June 2014	Succeeded by Ram Naresh Yadav (Additional Charge)
