= T. R. Prasad =

Indian civil servant (1941–2022)

Tata Ramachandra Prasad (15 July 1941 – 12 July 2022) was a bureaucrat from Andhra Pradesh, India, who worked as cabinet secretary and defence secretary in the national government.

He was of 1963 batch of Indian Administrative Service from the Andhra Pradesh cadre, was also the member of the 12th Finance Commission and director of several companies including the scam-tainted company Satyam Computer Services Ltd from which he resigned when Byrraju Ramalinga Raju admitted accounting fraud.

== Biography ==
Prasad was born in Nidubrolu town in Guntur district, Andhra Pradesh. He was born on 15 July 1941 to T. V. Subbaiah and Devudamma. Initially educated at Loyola College Vijayawada, Prasad held a master's degree in Physics (Electronics) from Banaras University. He was a lifetime fellow of the Institute of Engineers (FIE).

Prasad was of 1963 batch of Indian Administrative Service from the Andhra Pradesh cadre. He was appointed Union cabinet secretary on 1 November 2000, during the government of Atal Bihari Vajpayee. As he approached mandatory retirement at the age of 60, Vajpayee's government amended legislation to enable the government to extend the tenure of a cabinet secretary beyond that age by such a period as the government considers appropriate. Prasad retired as cabinet secretary on 31 October 2002.

Prasad died at his home in Visakhapatnam on 12 July 2022 at the age of 80. He suffered from amnesia prior to his death.

== Twelfth Finance Commission ==
During his stint as member of Twelfth Finance Commission, Prasad pointed out that India was almost 13 times below the FDI of China due to backwardness in education and infrastructure, which are key ingredients for growth. He also called for new fiscal reforms to stabilise growth and governance on the lines proposed by the Kelkar task force. He also called for the political leadership in India to lift itself above the party and sectarian interests for India's success in moving towards the new triangular paradigm: growth, governance and fiscal reforms. He was the member of Finance Commission until 31 December 2004, holding the rank of minister of state.

== Administrative career ==
Prasad's administrative career comprised:

- Member of Indian Administrative Service from 1963
- Officer on Special Duty in the Cabinet Secretary for 10 days from 20 October 2000 until 31 October 2000 before taking over as the India's foremost civil servant post on 1 November 2000
- Cabinet Secretary, Government of India, between 2000 and 2002
- Defence Secretary, Government of India
- Secretary, Industrial Policy and Promotion, Ministry of Industry
- Chairman, Foreign Investment Promotion Board (FIPB)
- Secretary, Heavy Industry
- Chairman, Maruthi Udyog Ltd.

== Directorships ==
Prasad was a member of the board of directors of several companies, such as:

- TVS Motors Company Ltd.
- Suven Life Sciences Ltd.
- Taj GVK Hotels and Resorts Ltd.
- Nelcast Ltd.
- GMR Infrastructure Company Ltd.
- Indofil Organic Industries Ltd.
- Pipavav Shipyard Ltd.
- Delhi International Airport Pvt Ltd.

== Satyam ==
Prasad was an independent director of Satyam Computer Services when that company was hit by a scandal related to false accounting that saw its founder and chairman, Byrraju Ramalinga Raju, resign.

Prasad did not immediately resign when the news broke but instead tried to steady the company. He blamed PricewaterhouseCoopers, the audit firm, and Raju for keeping the board of directors in the dark. When pressure mounted on him from various places across corporate India and also the government, he resigned not just from Satyam Computers but also from other directorships.
