= Uma Shankar Dikshit =

Indian politician

11th Governor of West Bengal
- In office 2 October 1984 – 12 August 1986
- Chief Minister: Jyoti Basu
- Preceded by: Satish Chandra (acting)
- Succeeded by: Saiyid Nurul Hasan

2nd Governor of Karnataka
- In office 10 January 1976 – 2 August 1977
- Chief Minister: D. Devaraj Urs
- Preceded by: Mohan Lal Sukhadia
- Succeeded by: Govind Narain

10th Minister of Home Affairs
- In office 5 February 1973 – 10 October 1974
- Prime Minister: Indira Gandhi
- Preceded by: Indira Gandhi
- Succeeded by: Kasu Brahmananda Reddy

Minister of Health and Family Welfare
- In office 19 May 1971 – 5 February 1973
- Prime Minister: Indira Gandhi
- Preceded by: Kodardas Kalidas Shah
- Succeeded by: Raghunath Keshav Khadilkar (As MoS)

Personal details
- Born: 12 January 1901 Ugu, North-Western Provinces, British India (Now in Uttar Pradesh, India)
- Died: 30 May 1991 (aged 90) New Delhi, India
- Party: Indian National Congress
- Relatives: Sheila Dikshit (daughter-in-law); Sandeep Dikshit (grandson)
- Education: Christ Church College, Kanpur

Uma Shankar Dikshit (12 January 1901 – 30 May 1991) was an Indian politician, cabinet minister and Governor of West Bengal and Governor of Karnataka.

== Life ==
He was born on 12 January 1901 at village Ugu of Unnao of Uttar Pradesh state, to the Kanyakubja Brahmin parents Ram Sarup and Shiv Pyari. He later studied at the Christ Church College, Kanpur. As a student, he joined the freedom movement and became the Secretary of the District Congress Committee Kanpur during the period when Ganesh Shankar Vidyarthi was the President of the committee. He was a member of the Congress Party faction consisting of NirmalChandra Chaturvedi, Uma Nehru and Rajeshwari Nehru under GB Pant as senior. He served the Country as the Home Minister, Health Minister and Governor of Karnataka & West Bengal. He also served as treasurer of All India Congress Committee, and managing director of Associated Journals at Lucknow. He founded a Girls Intermediate College at his village Ugu in the memory of his mother.
He was awarded Padma Vibhushan, the second highest civilian award in India in 1989, by the Government of India.

== Career ==
After Independence, he remained close to Nehru and later sided with Indira Gandhi during the 1969 split in Indian National Congress. He joined the Indira Gandhi cabinet in 1971, thereafter he remained Minister for Works and Housing, Govt. of India, 1971-72 later given additional charge of Health and Family Planning, Minister for Home Affairs, 1973–74 and Minister for Shipping and Transport, 1975. He also remained Treasurer, All India Congress Committee (AICC), 1970–75.

He remained the Governor of Karnataka, 1976–77 and Governor of West Bengal 1984–1986.

He died at New Delhi on 30 May 1991 after a prolonged illness at the age of 90 years.
