= Vijay Singh (civil servant) =

Indian civil servant

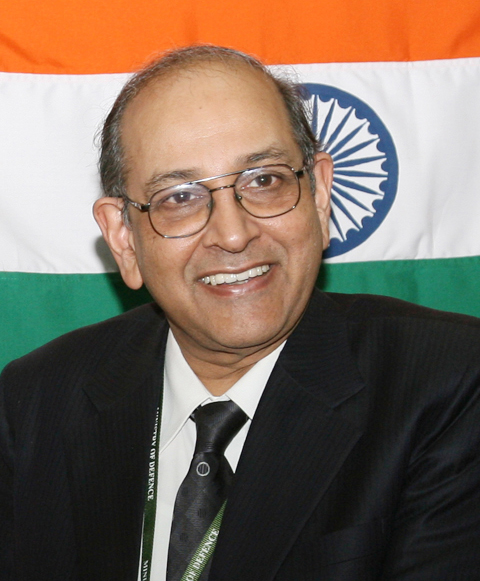

Vijay Singh (born 13 July 1948) is a former officer of the Indian Administrative Service (IAS), 1970 batch, Madhya Pradesh cadre. He was appointed Defence Secretary in the Ministry of Defence in August 2007. He succeeded Shekhar Dutt, IAS, of 1969 batch, who, on superannuation, was appointed Deputy National Security Advisor for Strategic and Defence related subjects in the National Security Council Secretariat, with rank and pay of Secretary to the Government of India, for a term of two years. In 2018, he was appointed chairman of Tata Advanced Systems and vice-chairman of Tata Trusts.

Mr. Vijay Singh is also a member of Governing Council at the prestigious Tata Memorial Centre, a grant-in-aid institution under the administrative control of the Department of Atomic Energy, Government of India.

== Career ==
Singh obtained his master's degree in history from Delhi University.

- 1970 joins IAS, Madhya Pradesh Cadre.
- 1971-1982, held various administrative posts, including that of District Magistrate of Gwalior and Bhopal.
- 1982-1987, on deputation to the Government of India, served as director and coordinator for festival of India in USA, France, USSR and Japan.
- 1987-1996, reverted to Madhya Pradesh, and served as Commissioner Jabalpur, and Indore Division, and Home Secretary.
- 1996-2004, on deputation to the Government of India, served as Financial Advisor, Ministry of Health and Family Welfare and Additional Secretary in the Ministries of Chemicals and Fertilizers and Information and Broadcasting
- 2004-2006, reverted to Madhya Pradesh, and served as Chief Secretary Madhya Pradesh.
- February- July 2006, Secretary, Department of Ayurveda, Yoga & Naturopathy, Unani, Siddha and Homoeopathy in the Ministry of Health & Family Welfare.
- August 2006-July 2007, Secretary, Road Transport and Highways in the Ministry of Shipping, Road Transport and Highways.
- August 2007-July 2009, Defence Secretary, superannuated, 31 July 2009, after a term of two years. He was succeeded by Pradeep Kumar, Secretary, Department of Defence Production, a 1972 batch IAS officer of Haryana cadre on 1 August 2009.
- Nov 2009-April 2013, Member, Union Public Service Commission . Resigned in April, 2013, from the UPSC. Joined Tata and Sons, few months after leaving the UPSC.
- Nov 2013-to date, Non Executive Director of Tata Sons.
