= Secretary to the Government of India =

Indian government official

Union Secretary
- State Emblem of India

- Flag of India
- Government of India
- Member of: Committee of Secretaries on Administration
- Reports to: Parliament of India; President of India; Union Council of Ministers; Prime Minister of India
- Seat: Union Ministries of India, New Delhi
- Appointer: Appointments Committee of the Cabinet
- Term length: No term length; Term extendable
- Formation: 1st November 1858; 168 years ago (Note: On 1 Nov 1858, British Crown assumes rule; Queen's Proclamation issued; departments reorganized under Viceroy and Executive Council. Secretaries to the Government of India appointed for key departments like Home, Finance, Revenue, etc. During 1860s–1900s, The title “Secretary to the Government of India” is in regular use in India Office Records and gazettes (e.g., “H. H. Risley, Secretary to the Government of India in the Home Department”).)
- Succession: 23rd (on the Indian order of precedence.)
- Salary: ₹225,000 (US$2,300) monthly

Secretary to the Government of India, often abbreviated as Secretary, GoI, or simply as Secretary, is a post and a rank under the Central Staffing Scheme of the Government of India. The authority for the creation of this post solely rests with the Union Council of Ministers.

The position holder is generally a career civil servant and a government official of high seniority. The civil servants who hold this rank and post are either from All India Services or Central Civil Services. All promotions and appointments to this rank and post are directly made by the Appointments Committee of the Cabinet.

In the functioning of the Government of India, a secretary is the administrative head of a ministry or department, and is equivalent to chief secretaries of state governments and Vice Chief of the Army Staff, General Officers Commanding in Chief of Army Commands, and their equivalents in the Indian Armed Forces, In the Department of Military Affairs, the Chief of Defence Staff is currently designated as Secretary (GoI), similarly in the National Security Council Secretariat, the National Security Advisor is currently designated as Secretary (GoI).

Secretaries (GOI) rank 23rd on Order of Precedence of India.

== Special Secretary ==
A Special Secretary in the Government of India is an officer of Secretary-equivalent rank appointed for a specific, time-bound assignment. The role is focused and task-oriented, with the officer typically handling only the designated responsibility. While often associated with legislative tasks, the role may be created for any priority assignment requiring dedicated attention and expedited execution. A Special Secretary receives salary, allowances, and other benefits broadly equivalent to those of a Secretary to the Government of India.

== History ==
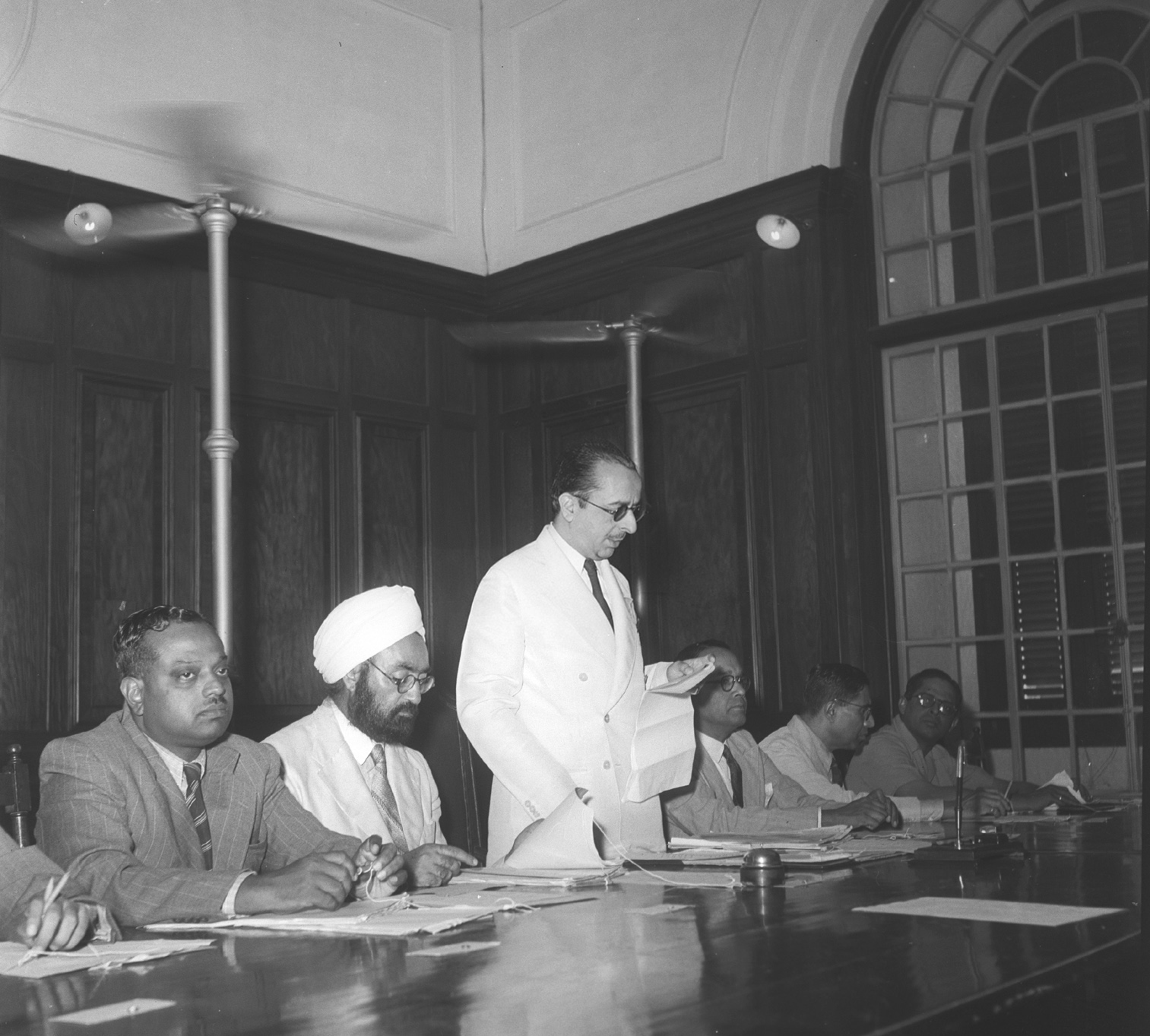
C. H. Bhabha with a Secretary and a few Joint Secretaries to the Government of India in 1947.

In mid-1930s, the Central Secretariat contained only twenty-nine secretaries, who were all members of the Indian Civil Service. The salary for a member of this rank and post was fixed at ₹48,000 (equivalent to ₹13 million or US$130,000 in 2026) annum in the 1930s. As per warrant or precedence of 1905, secretaries to the Government of India was listed together with joint secretaries to the Government of India and were ranked above the rank of chief secretaries of provincial governments.

N. Gopalaswami Ayyangar had once suggested "[a] secretary should not be immersed in files and burdened with routine. It is essential that he should have time to grasp the overall picture, size up the problems facing the government in the field allotted to his charge, and think and plan ahead. All these are his proper functions and must be efficiently performed. Failure to make adequate provision in this respect cannot be compensated by a mere increase in the establishment under his control." The Administrative Reforms Commission visualised the role of secretary, primarily as one of a "coordinator, policy guide, reviewer, and evaluator."

Before Partition of India, notable officers who served as Secretary in the Central Government include - Allan Hume, Edward Buck, Thomas Holderness, N. R. Pillai, Y. N. Sukthankar, Charles Ogilvie, Archdale Earle, Charles Todhunter, Jeremy Raisman, Herbert Hope Risley, Robert Carlyle, Henry Smith, C. S. Venkatachar, V. P. Menon.

== Tenure and Appointment ==
A member of All India Services is appointed to this rank and post only on tenure. This tenure is a deputation to the Central Government and does not carry a fixed term. They serve at the pleasure and will of the Appointments Committee of the Cabinet.

A member of Central Civil Services is appointed to this rank and post as per vacancy in their own service cadre and are empanelled.

== Powers, responsibilities and postings ==
The organizational structure of a department of the Government of India.

A secretary to the Government of India is the administrative head of a ministry or department and is the principal adviser to the minister-in charge on all matters of policy and administration within the ministry or department.

The role of a secretary is as follows:

- To act as the administrative head of the ministry or department. The responsibility in this regard is complete and undivided.
- To act as the chief adviser to the minister on all aspects of policy and administrative affairs.
- To represent the ministry or department before the Public Accounts Committee of the Parliament of India.

The prime minister-led Appointments Committee of the Cabinet is the final authority on posting and transfer of officers of secretary level. Secretaries report to their ministerial cabinet minister and to the prime minister.

== Position ==
In the Indian government, secretaries are the head of the ministries of the government and hold positions such as Finance Secretary, Defence Secretary, Foreign Secretary, Home Secretary, Chairperson of the Railway Board and members of the Railway Board and Telecom Commission.

According to the report of the Seventh Central Pay Commission of India, seventy-one out of ninety-one secretaries to the Government of India are from the Indian Administrative Service.

== Emolument, accommodation and prequisites ==
An Indian diplomatic passport and an official generally issued to Secretaries to the Government of India.

All secretaries to the Government of India are eligible for a Diplomatic passport or Official passport. Secretaries are allotted either type-VII or type-VIII bungalows in areas like New Moti Bagh and Lutyens' across Delhi by the Ministry of Housing and Urban Affairs' Directorate of Estates.

The salary and emolument in this rank is equivalent to chief secretaries of state governments and to Vice Chief of the Army Staff, General Officers Commanding in Chief of Army Commands, and their equivalents, in the Indian Armed Forces, which is to say Level 17 of the Central Pay Matrix.

Secretary to the Government of India monthly pay and allowances
Base salary as per the Seventh Pay Commission	Pay matrix level	Sources
₹225,000 (US$2,300) per month	Pay level 17	

== International equivalency ==
The position of Secretary in Government of India is equivalent to Permanent Secretary in His Majesty's Civil Service (UK), Administrative Vice-Ministers in Civil service of Japan, Secretary General in Italian Senior Civil Service, Department secretary in Australian Government, Deputy Minister in Government of Canada and Federal Secretary in Central Superior Services of Pakistan.

== List of current secretaries to the Government of India ==
Secretaries to the Government of India
Office or Ministry	Designation	Name of secretary	Background	Batch
President's Secretariat	Secretary to the President	Deepti Umashankar	IAS	1993
Vice President's Secretariat	Secretary to the Vice President	Amit Khare	IAS	1985 (Note: Retired)
Prime Minister's Office	Principal Secretary to the Prime Minister	P.K. Mishra	IAS	1972
Prime Minister's Office	Principal Secretary to the Prime Minister	Shaktikanta Das	IAS	1980
Supreme Court Registry Office	Secretary General of Supreme Court of India	Bharat Parashar	Legal Service	—
Parliament's Secretariat	Secretary General of the Rajya Sabha	Pramod Chandra Mody	IRS (IT)	1982
Parliament's Secretariat	Secretary General of the Lok Sabha	Utpal Kumar Singh	IAS	1986
Cabinet Secretariat	Cabinet Secretary (Note: Cabinet Secretary is not a secretary rank position but the highest level of empanelment in the Government of India is at the secretary rank.)	T. V. Somanathan	IAS	1987
Cabinet Secretariat	Secretary (Coordination)	Manoj Govil	IAS	1991
Cabinet Secretariat	Secretary (Security)	Rajiv Singh	IPS	1993
Cabinet Secretariat	Secretary (Research)	Parag Jain	IPS	1989
Agriculture and Farmers Welfare	Secretary (Agriculture and Farmers Welfare)	Atish Chandra	IAS	1994
Agriculture and Farmers Welfare	Secretary (Agricultural Research and Education)	Mangi Lal Jat	Scientist	—
Atomic Energy	Secretary (Atomic Energy) and chairperson, Atomic Energy Commission	Ajit Kumar Mohanty	Scientist	—
AYUSH	Secretary (AYUSH)	Rajesh Kotecha	Scientist	—
Chemicals and Fertilizers	Secretary (Chemicals and Petrochemicals)	Tejveer Singh	IAS	1994
Chemicals and Fertilizers	Secretary (Fertilizers)	Rajat Kumar Mishra	IAS	1992
Chemicals and Fertilizers	Secretary (Pharmaceuticals)	Manoj Joshi	IAS	1989
Civil Aviation	Secretary (Civil Aviation)	Samir Kumar Sinha	IAS	1994
Coal	Secretary (Coal)	Vikram Dev Dutt	IAS	1993
Commerce and Industry	Secretary (Commerce)	Rajesh Agarwal	IAS	1994
Commerce and Industry	Secretary (Promotion of Industry and Internal Trade)	Amardeep Singh Bhatia	IAS	1993
Communications	Secretary (Posts)	Subrat Das	IPoS	1991
Communications	Secretary (Telecommunications) and ex officio Chairperson, Digital Communication Commission	Amit Agrawal	IAS	1993
Consumer Affairs, Food and Public Distribution	Secretary (Consumer Affairs)	Nidhi Khare	IAS	1992
Consumer Affairs, Food and Public Distribution	Secretary (Food and Public Distribution)	Sanjeev Chopra	IAS	1990
Co-operation	Secretary (Co-operation)	Ashish Kumar Bhutani	IAS	1992
Corporate Affairs	Secretary (Corporate Affairs)	Pallavi Jain Govil	IAS	1994
Culture	Secretary (Culture)	Vivek Aggarwal	IAS	1994
Defence	Defence Secretary	Rajesh Kumar Singh	IAS	1989
Defence	Secretary (Defence Research and Development) and chairperson, DRDO	Rajesh Kumar Singh	IAS	1989
Defence	Secretary (Defence Production)	Sanjeev Kumar	IAS	1993
Defence	Secretary (Ex-Servicemen Welfare)	Sukriti Likhi	IAS	1993
Defence	Secretary (Department of Military Affairs) and Chief of Defence Staff	General N. S. Raja Subramani	Indian Armed Forces	—
Development of North Eastern Region	Secretary (Development of North Eastern Region)	Katikithala Srinivas	IAS	1989
Earth Sciences	Secretary (Earth Sciences) and Chairperson, Earth Commission	Srinivasa Kumar Tummala	Scientist	—
Education	Secretary (Higher Education)	Deepti Gaur Mukerjee	IAS	1993
Education	Secretary (School Education and Literacy)	T K Anil Kumar	IAS	1995
Electronics and Information Technology	Secretary (Electronics and Information Technology)	S. Krishnan	IAS	1989
Environment, Forest and Climate Change	Secretary (Environment, Forest and Climate Change)	Narendra Bhooshan	IAS	1992
External Affairs	Foreign Secretary	Vikram Misri	IFS	1989
External Affairs	Secretary (East)	Rudrendra Tandon	IFS	1994
External Affairs	Secretary (West)	Sibi George	IFS	1993
External Affairs	Secretary (CPV & OIA)	Sripriya Ranganathan	IFS	1994
External Affairs	Secretary (Economic Relations)	Vacant	IFS	
External Affairs	Secretary (South)	Vacant	IFS	
Finance	Secretary (Expenditure)	Vumlunmang Vualnam	IAS	1992
Finance	Secretary (Economic Affairs)	Anuradha Thakur	IAS	1994
Finance	Secretary (Public Enterprises)	K Moses Chalai	IAS	1990
Finance	Secretary (Revenue Secretary)	Arvind Shrivastava	IAS	1994
Finance	Finance Secretary; Secretary (Investment and Public Asset Management)	Arunish Chawla	IAS	1992
Finance	Secretary (Financial Services)	Sanjay Lohiya	IAS	1994
Fisheries, Animal Husbandry and Dairying	Secretary (Animal Husbandry and Dairying)	Sushil Kumar Lohani	IAS	1995
Fisheries, Animal Husbandry and Dairying	Secretary (Fisheries)	Dr. Abhilaksh Likhi	IAS	1991
Food Processing Industries	Secretary (Food Processing Industries)	Avinash Purushottam Das Joshi	IAS	1994
Health and Family Welfare	Secretary (Health and Family Welfare)	Punya Salila Srivastava	IAS	1993
Health and Family Welfare	Secretary (Health Research) and ex officio Director General, ICMR	Dr. Rajiv Bahl	Scientist	—
Heavy Industries	Secretary (Heavy Industry)	Kamran Rizvi	IAS	1991
Home Affairs	Home Secretary	Govind Mohan	IAS	1989
Home Affairs	Secretary (Official Language)	V. L. Kantha Rao	IAS	1992
Home Affairs	Secretary (Border Management)	Rajendra Kumar	IAS	1992
Home Affairs	Secretary (Inter-State Council Secretariat)	Ashish Srivastava	IAS	1992
Housing and Urban Affairs	Secretary (Housing and Urban Affairs)	Satendra Singh	IAS	1996
Housing and Urban Affairs	Secretary (Department of Capital Development)	D Thara	IAS	1996
Information and Broadcasting	Secretary (Information and Broadcasting)	Chanchal Kumar	IAS	1992
Jal Shakti	Secretary (Drinking Water and Sanitation)	Ashok Kumar Kaluaram Meena	IAS	1993
Jal Shakti	Secretary (Water Resources, River Development & Ganga Rejuvenation)	Archana Varma	IAS	1995
Labour and Employment	Secretary (Labour and Employment)	Chandra Bhushan Kumar	IAS	1995
Law and Justice	Secretary (Justice)	Niraj Verma	IAS	1994
Law and Justice	Secretary (Legal Affairs)	Anju Rathi Rana	Legal Service	—
Law and Justice	Secretary (Legislative)	Dr. Rajiv Mani	Legal Service	—
Micro, Small and Medium Enterprises	Secretary (Micro, Small and Medium Enterprises)	Bharat Harbanslal Khera	IAS	1994
Mines	Secretary (Mines)	Keshav Chandra	IAS	1995
Minority Affairs	Secretary (Minority Affairs)	Suchindra Misra	IAS	1992
New and Renewable Energy	Secretary (New and Renewable Energy)	Santosh Kumar Sarangi	IAS	1994
NITI Aayog ( previously Planning Commission)	Chief Executive Officer and ex officio Secretary	Anurag Jain	IAS	1989
Panchayati Raj	Secretary (Panchayati Raj)	Vineet Joshi	IAS	1992
Parliamentary Affairs	Secretary (Parliamentary Affairs)	Nikunja Bihari Dhal	IAS	1993
Personnel, Public Grievances and Pensions	Secretary (Personnel and Training)	Rachna Shah	IAS	1991
Personnel, Public Grievances and Pensions	Secretary (Administrative Reforms and Public Grievances)	Nivedita Shukla Verma	IAS	1991
Personnel, Public Grievances and Pensions	Secretary (Pension and Pensioners’ Welfare)	Nivedita Shukla Verma	IAS	1991
Petroleum and Natural Gas	Secretary (Petroleum and Natural Gas)	Neeraj Mittal	IAS	1992
Ports, Shipping and Waterways	Secretary (Ports, Shipping and Waterways)	Vijay Kumar	IAS	1992
Power	Secretary (Power)	Pankaj Agarwal	IAS	1992
Ministry of Railway (Railway Board)	Chairperson, Railway Board and ex officio Principal Secretary	Satish Kumar	IRSME	1986
Road Transport and Highways	Secretary (Road Transport and Highways)	V Umashankar	IAS	1989
Rural Development	Secretary (Land Resources)	Dilip Kumar	IAS	1995
Rural Development	Secretary (Rural Development)	Rohit Kansal	IAS	1995
Science and Technology	Secretary (Biotechnology)	Rajesh Sudhir Gokhale	Scientist	—
Science and Technology	Secretary (Science and Technology)	Umesh Waghmare	Scientist	—
Science and Technology	Secretary (Scientific and Industrial Research) and ex officio Director General, CSIR	N. Kalaiselvi	Scientist	—
Skill Development and Entrepreneurship	Secretary (Skill Development and Entrepreneurship)	Debashree Mukherjee	IAS	1991
Social Justice and Empowerment	Secretary (Empowerment of Persons with Disabilities)	V Vidyavathi	IAS	1991
Social Justice and Empowerment	Secretary (Social Justice and Empowerment)	Sudhansh Pant	IAS	1991
Statistics and Programme Implementation	Secretary (Statistics and Programme Implementation)	Saurabh Garg	IAS	1991
Space	Secretary (Space) and ex officio Chairperson of ISRO and Space Commission	V. Narayanan	Scientist	—
Steel	Secretary (Steel)	Sandeep Pondrik	IAS	1993
Textiles	Secretary (Textiles)	Neelam Shammi Rao	IAS	1992
Tourism	Secretary (Tourism)	Bhuvnesh Kumar	IAS	1995
Tribal Affairs	Secretary (Tribal Affairs)	Ranjana Chopra	IAS	1994
Women and Child Development	Secretary (Women and Child Development)	Anil Malik	IAS	1991
Youth Affairs and Sports	Secretary (Sports)	Hari Ranjan Rao	IAS	1994
Youth Affairs and Sports	Secretary (Youth Affairs)	Sunil Paliwal	IAS	1993

== Reforms and challenges ==
Media articles and others have argued in favour of lateral entrants being recruited to this rank/post to infuse fresh energy and thinking into an insular, complacent and archaic bureaucracy.

Non-IAS civil services have complained to the Government of India because of lack of empanelment in the rank/post of secretary on numerous occasions.

=== Lateral entry ===
From 1998 to 1999, Vijay Kelkar served as Finance Secretary as a lateral entry. During the term of Atal Bihari Vajpayee and Manmohan Singh as Prime Minister of India, Ram Vinay Shahi served as Secretary (GOI) in the Ministry of Power from 2002 to 2007 as a lateral entry.

== See also ==
- Federal Secretary
- Chief secretary (India)

== Bibliography ==
- Laxmikanth, M. (2014). Governance in India (2nd ed.). Noida: McGraw Hill Education. ISBN 978-9339204785.
- Maheshwari, S.R. (2000). Indian Administration (6th ed.). New Delhi: Orient Blackswan Private Ltd. ISBN 9788125019886.
- Kirk-Greene, A. (2000). Britain's Imperial Administrators, 1858-1966. New York City: Springer. ISBN 9780230286320.
- Singh, Hoshiar; Singh, Pankaj (2011). Indian Administration (1st ed.). Delhi: Pearson Education India. ISBN 978-8131761199.
- Verma, K.B. (1987). Readings In Indian Railway Finance. New Delhi: Mittal Publications. ISBN 978-8171881215.
