= K. B. Lall =

Indian civil servant (1917–2005)

K. B. Lall ICS
- Born: 1917; Channi
- Died: 2005 (aged 87–88); Mumbai
- Occupation: Civil servant
- Children: Rajiv Lall

Krishan Behari Lall, ICS (1917–2005) was an eminent civil servant of India and a member of ICS. He was Defence Secretary of India during the Indo-Pakistani war of 1971. Earlier, he served as commerce secretary as well as ambassador to the European Common Market, as the European Union was then known.

Ambassador Lall was also accredited to the Grand Duchy of Luxembourg. In this capacity he inaugurated with the former minister of foreign affairs of Luxembourg, Mr. Gaston Thorn, the bust of Mahatma Gandhi in the Municipal Park in Luxembourg-City on 21 June 1973. The bronze bust sculpture by the famous modernist artist Amar Nath Sehgal (1922–2007) was a gift by the philanthropist Henry J. Leir.

During his tenure at the Ministry of Defence under Defence Minister Jagjivan Ram, Lall handled administrative and policy matters related to the 1971 Indo-Pakistani War.

He was conferred Padma Vibhushan award in 2000.

He died at the age of 88 in 2005.
