= Appointments Committee of the Cabinet =

Indian cabinet committee for appointment of senior officials

- मंत्रिमंडल की नियुक्ति समिति
- Emblem of The Government of India

Committee of the Cabinet overview
- Formed: 26 January 1950
- Type: Appointing Authority
- Jurisdiction: India
- Status: Active
- Headquarters: New Delhi
- Ministers responsible: Narendra Modi, Prime Minister of India; Amit Shah, Minister of Home Affairs
- Committee of the Cabinet executive: Manisha Saxena, IAS, Secretary, Appointments Committee of the Cabinet and Establishment Officer
- Parent Committee of the Cabinet: Cabinet Secretariat

The Appointments Committee of the Cabinet (ACC) is a high-level committee within the Government of India responsible for appointing senior officials to key positions in the central government and public sector undertakings. Established in 1950, the ACC is chaired by the Prime Minister of India and includes the Minister of Home Affairs as a member. The committee plays a crucial role in selecting and appointing individuals to various top posts. The ACC's decisions are processed through the Establishment Officer's Division of the Department of Personnel and Training, which functions as the committee's secretariat. As one of the eight Cabinet Committees of India, the ACC's composition and functions are designed to ensure efficient and transparent selection processes for critical government positions.

== Appointments decided ==
The Establishment Officer's Division (EO Division) processes all proposals for senior appointments in the Government of India that require the approval of the Appointments Committee of the Cabinet under the Government of India Transactions of Business Rules, 1961. The committee makes appointments to posts of

Key Positions and Officials by Category
Category	Positions / Officers
Prime Minister's Office	Principal Secretary; National Security Advisor; Additional National Security Advisor; Deputy National Security Advisor; Chairperson of ISRO; Chariperson of AEC
Administration	Cabinet Secretary; Foreign Secretary; Home Secretary; Secretaries; Special Secretary; Additional Secretary; Joint secretary
Intelligence & Investigation	Secretary of the R&AW; Director of the IB; Chairperson of the NTRO; Director General of the NIA; Director of the CBI; Director General of the DIA; Director of the ED
Defence & Armed Forces	Defence Secretary; Chief of Defence Staff; Chief of Army Staff; Chief of Naval Staff; Chief of Air Staff; Director General Military Operations; Director General Naval Operations; Director General Air Operations; Chairperson of the DRDO; Scientific Advisor to the Defence Minister; Director General of AFMC; Director General of Ordnance; Director General of Defence Estates; Controller General of Defence Accounts
Finance & Economy	Governor of the Reserve Bank of India; Finance Secretary; Deputy Governor of the Reserve Bank of India; Chairperson of SEBI; Chairperson of NABARD
Railways & Public Sector	Chairperson and Members of the Railway Board; Chairpersons and Directors of the board in PSUs
Legal & Vigilance	Solicitor General of India; Chief Vigilance Officers

This Committee decides on all important empanelments and shift of officers serving on Central deputation. In addition, all appointments by promotion that require ACC approval are processed through the E.O. Division. For this purpose, the Establishment Officer functions as the Secretary to the Appointments Committee of the Cabinet.

The Additional Secretary and Establishment Officer in the Department of Personnel and Training is the ex-officio Member Secretary of the Civil Services Board that is chaired by the Cabinet Secretary. This Board makes recommendations for appointments in respect of the posts of Deputy Secretary, Director and Joint Secretary under the Central Staffing Scheme. In addition, the Board makes recommendations to the ACC for the inclusion of officers in the Joint Secretaries suitability list.

Furthermore, the Establishment Officer is Member Secretary of the Screening Committee, chaired by the Cabinet Secretary and including Secretary (P) and Finance Secretary, that has been constituted for the screening of cases of assignments under Rule 6(2)(ii) of the AIS (Cadre) Rules 1954 and assignments in international organizations in respect of JS level and above officers of organized Group ‘A’ and Group ‘B’ services. The EO is also Member Secretary of the Central Establishment Board (CEB), which is chaired by Secretary (Personnel). This Board makes recommendations for deputing officers on foreign training, assessment of Central Secretariat Service officers for appointments to the posts of Deputy Secretary and Director in the Ministries/Departments as well as premature retirement under the relevant rules in respect of officers below the rank of Joint Secretary.

== Cabinet Committees of India ==
The eight Committees of the Cabinet are:

1. Appointments Committee of the Cabinet
2. Cabinet Committee on Accommodation
3. Cabinet Committee on Economic Affairs
4. Cabinet Committee on Parliamentary Affairs
5. Cabinet Committee on Political Affairs
6. Cabinet Committee on Security
7. Cabinet Committee on Investment and Growth
8. Cabinet Committee on Employment and Skill Development

All committees of the cabinet except that of Parliamentary Affairs and Accommodation are chaired by the Prime Minister. Cabinet Committee on Parliamentary Affairs is headed by Defence Minister Rajnath Singh under both Modi ministries i.e. 2014-19 and 2019–2024.

In the Second Modi ministry, Prime Minister Narendra Modi formed two new committees under his chairmanship to focus on two key concerns: Employment and Skill Development, and Investment and Growth.

== See also ==
- Constitution of India
