= India Rejuvenation Initiative =

The India Rejuvenation Initiative is an Indian anti-corruption organization formed by a group of retired and serving bureaucrats. IRI raises issues affecting common people. Started in the year 2005 by a group of people drawn from all walks of life, IRI focussed its attention towards corruption prevalent at the top echelons of Indian polity.

== Objectives ==
Its important objectives are:

- Force the system to become accountable and enforce rule of law.
- Attack corruption at the top.
- Interact with and support honest civil servants, whistleblowers.
- Mobilize public opinion for ensuring that public representatives remain accountable.
- Scrutinize public policies for flaws which contribute to corruption or protect vested interests.
- Promotion and strengthening of decentralized governance.
- Do regular interaction with the youth.
- Organize youth to bring about changes in the way governments are being run at present.

== Prominent members ==
- R.C. Lahoti - Former Chief Justice of India
- J.M. Lyngdoh - Former Chief Election Commissioner of India
- V. K. Shunglu - Former Comptroller and Auditor General of India
- Srinivasapuram Krishnaswamy - Former Chief of Air Staff India of Indian Air Force
- J. F. Ribeiro - Former Director General of Police
- Prakash Singh - Former Director General of Police
- Shri Krishna Joshi - Former Director General Council of Scientific and Industrial Research
- Bhure Lal - Former Secretary to Government of India
- S.A.T. Rizvi - Former Secretary to Government of India
- Hari Gautam - Former Chairman University Grants Commission (India)
- S.P. Taluqdar - Former Member National Security Advisory Board
- Prof. S.K. Dube - Former Director IIT Kharagpur
- Arvind Verma- Former Secretary Government of India
- S.N.Shukla Ex. I.A.S
- Vijay Shankar Pandey, IAS (Retd ), Former Secretary to Government of India
- I.C.Diwedi, Former D.G.P Uttar Pradesh
- S.R. Lakha, Former Chairman Uttar Pradesh Public Service Commission
- S.N.Singh, IPS (Retd.)
- Jasvir Singh, IPS

== Activities ==
It was among the prime movers in the petition to the Supreme Court of India opposing the appointment of P. J. Thomas as Chief Vigilance Commissioner. Thomas had been charged with corruption in a 1992 case that was prevented from coming to trial since the government refused to sanction trial. After considerable controversy, the Supreme court invalidated his appointment to the CVC in March 2011. Ex-Election Commissioner of India, J. M. Lyngdoh, was one of the key people in this effort. In addition to that, IRI filed petition in the Supreme Court on the issue of Black money stashed in foreign banks and locations, Cash for vote scam and on the issue of autonomy of SEBI

Recently IRI has taken up the issue of electoral reforms in its agenda and has filed a Public Interest Litigation against criminalization in politics. Supreme Court of India after hearing the PIL issued notices to Govt. of India and states to respond within four weeks.

IRI also filed PIL for prompt and fair investigation of the Cash for Vote Scam which led to arrest of Amar Singh, Ex M.P.

Recently as a result of PIL filed by IRI, the Chairman of Uttar Pradesh Public Service Commission was removed by the order of HC Allahabad.

One of the members ex-Chief Justice of India Justice R.C. Lahoti in July 2010, protested the ineffectiveness of the CVC in protecting whistleblowers.

With its strong presence in many states, it has emerged as a front runner organization to bring back probity in public life.
