= Auditing in India =

Auditing in India is a system of independently reviewing the records/activities and expressing an opinion thereon.

== Types ==
=== Social audit ===
Social audit is a process of reviewing official records and determining whether state reported expenditures reflect the actual monies spent on the ground.

Civil society organisations (CSOs), Non-governmental organization (NGOs), political representatives, civil servants and workers of Dungarpur district of Rajasthan and Anantapuram district of Andhra Pradesh collectively organise such social audits to prevent mass corruption under the Mahatma Gandhi National Rural Employment Guarantee Act (MGNREGA).

=== Statutory audit ===
Statutory audit refers to the audit based on the laws applicable on the entity for the time being in force. It is governed by the Indian Accounting Standards (Ind-AS) issued by Institute of Chartered Accountants of India from time to time. A Chartered accountant holding a certificate of practice in India is qualified to be a statutory auditor. This is as per convention of Companies Act 2013.

=== Other ===
- Internal Audit
- Government Audit
- Environmental audit
- Logistics Audit

== CAG ==
The Comptroller and Auditor General (CAG) of India is an authority, established by the Constitution under Constitution of India/Part V Chapter V/Sub-part 7B/Article 148, who audits all receipts and expenditure of the Government of India and the state governments, including those of bodies and authorities substantially financed by the government. The CAG is also the external auditor of Government-owned corporations and conducts supplementary audit of government companies, i.e., any non-banking/ non-insurance company in which Union Government has an equity share of at least 51 per cent or subsidiary companies of existing government companies. The reports of the CAG are taken into consideration by the Public Accounts Committees (PACs) and Committees on Public Undertakings (COPUs), which are special committees in the Parliament of India and the state legislatures. The CAG is also the head of the Indian Audit and Accounts Department, the affairs of which are managed by officers of Indian Audit and Accounts Service, and has over 45,000 employees across the country.

The CAG is ranked 9th and enjoys the same status as a judge of Supreme Court of India in Indian order of precedence. The current CAG of India is Girish Chandra Murmu, who assumed the office on 8 August 2020. He is the 14th CAG of India.

== ICAI ==
The Institute of Chartered Accountants of India was established under the Chartered Accountants Act, 1949 passed by the Parliament of India with the objective of regulating accountancy profession in India. ICAI is the second largest professional accounting body in the world in terms of membership second only to AICPA. It prescribes the qualifications for a Chartered Accountant, conducts the requisite examinations and grants license in the form of Certificate of Practice. Apart from this primary function, it also helps various government agencies like RBI, SEBI, MCA, CAG, IRDA, etc. in policy formulation. ICAI actively engages itself in aiding and advising economic policy formulation. For example, ICAI has submitted its suggestions on the proposed Direct Taxes Code Bill, 2010. It also has submitted its suggestions on the Companies Bill, 2009. The government also takes the suggestions of ICAI as expert advice and considers it favorably. ICAI presented an approach paper on issues in implementing Goods and Service Tax in India to the Ministry of Finance. In response to this, Ministry of Finance has suggested that ICAI take a lead and help the government in implementing Goods and Services Tax (GST). It is because of this active participation in formulation economic legislation, it has been designated by A. P. J. Abdul Kalam as a "Partner in Nation Building".
