= Shunglu Committee =

Political Committee

Shunglu Committee was a committee of three experts instituted to examine the irregularities and cases of nepotism in the appointments across various Delhi state government departments under the Arvind Kejriwal led Aam Aadmi Party government in Delhi.

== Background ==
The Delhi High Court on 4 August 2016 ruled that the Lt. Governor is the administrative head of Delhi and stated that decisions taken by the Delhi government without consulting the Lt Governor as illegal.

Subsequently, on 30 August 2016 the Lt. Governor Najeeb Jung set up an expert committee to examine the 400-odd files for 'infirmities and irregularities' pertaining to decisions taken by the Arvind Kejriwal-led Aam Aadmi Party government without his approval.

== Members ==
The committee consists of former Comptroller and Auditor General V. K. Shunglu, former Chief Election Commissioner N. Gopalaswami and former Chief Vigilance Commissioner Pradeep Kumar.

== Report ==
The committee submitted its report on 27 November 2016. The appointment of Delhi Health Minister Satyendar Jain’s daughter Soumya Jain to the health department was mentioned in the report as a case of nepotism.

Gopal Rai as the transport minister of Delhi had launched a premium bus service which the committee described as faulty.

It also questioned assignment of government quarters to Delhi Commission for Women (DCW) chief Swati Maliwal and MLA Akhilesh Pati Tripathi. The appointment of Nikunj Agarwal, a relative of Kejriwal's wife, as Officer on Special Duty (OSD) to the health minister was deemed a "case of violation of recruitment procedure and lack of authority" by the committee. AAP had also wrongly allotted the government-owned 206, Rouse Avenue bungalow for the party's use and was fined 27 lakh rupees for "unauthorized occupation".
