= Indian Audit and Accounts Service =

Government of India Civil Service

- Service overview
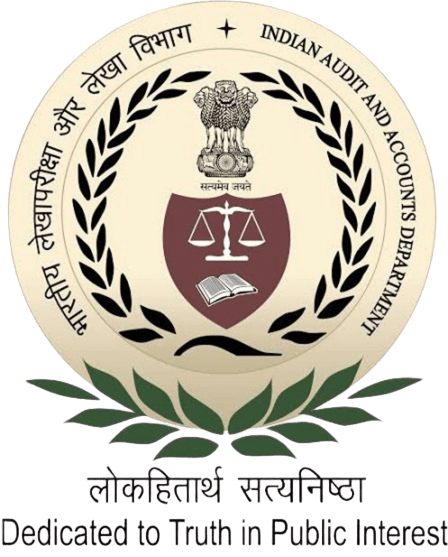
- Motto: लोकहितार्थ सत्यनिष्ठा (Hindi) "Dedicated to Truth in Public Interest"
- Formed: 1860; 166 years ago
- Headquarters: Pocket-9, Deen Dayal Upadhyaya Marg, New Delhi - 110124
- Country: India
- Training: National Academy of Audit & Accounts, Yarrows, Shimla
- Controlling Authority: Comptroller and Auditor General of India
- Legal personality: Governmental: Civil Service
- General Nature: Training Institute
- Preceding Service: Indian Civil Service
- Cadre Size: 616 (August 2007)

Service Chief
- CAG: K Sanjay Murthy, IAS

Indian Audit and Accounts Service (IA&AS) is a group 'A' central civil service under the Comptroller and Auditor General of India, the supreme audit institution of India. Its central civil servants serve in an audit managerial capacity in the Indian Audit and Accounts Department (IA&AD), and are responsible for auditing the accounts of the Union government and state governments, as well as their public commercial enterprises and non-commercial autonomous bodies. The service's role is analogous to the US Government Accountability Office and the UK National Audit Office.

== History ==
Under the East India Company, the accounts of the 3 Presidencies of Bengal, Madras and Bombay were prepared separately. In 1857, a combined department called the General Department of Account was constituted, and an Accountant General was appointed to head it. The Indian Audit and Accounts Service traces its history to 1860, when these posts were amalgamated by the British Colonial Government to create the post of first Auditor General who had both accounting and auditing functions. It was given statutory recognition by the Government of India Act, 1919, and further strengthened by the Government of India Act, 1935. After India gained independence and the Constitution came into force, the Auditor General was re-designated as the Comptroller & Auditor General of India. In 1971, the CAG's (Duties, Powers and Conditions of Service) Act was enacted, which defined the duties and powers of the CAG of India. By section 2 of this legislation, the IA&AD obtained powers for performance of its duties on behalf of the Comptroller & Auditor General.

== Recruitment ==
There are two modes for recruitment into the Indian Audit and Accounts Service. 50% of IA&AS officers are recruited by the Civil Services Examination conducted by UPSC. Officers recruited this way are called direct recruits. The remaining 50% are recruited by promotion from subordinate cadres.

== Training ==
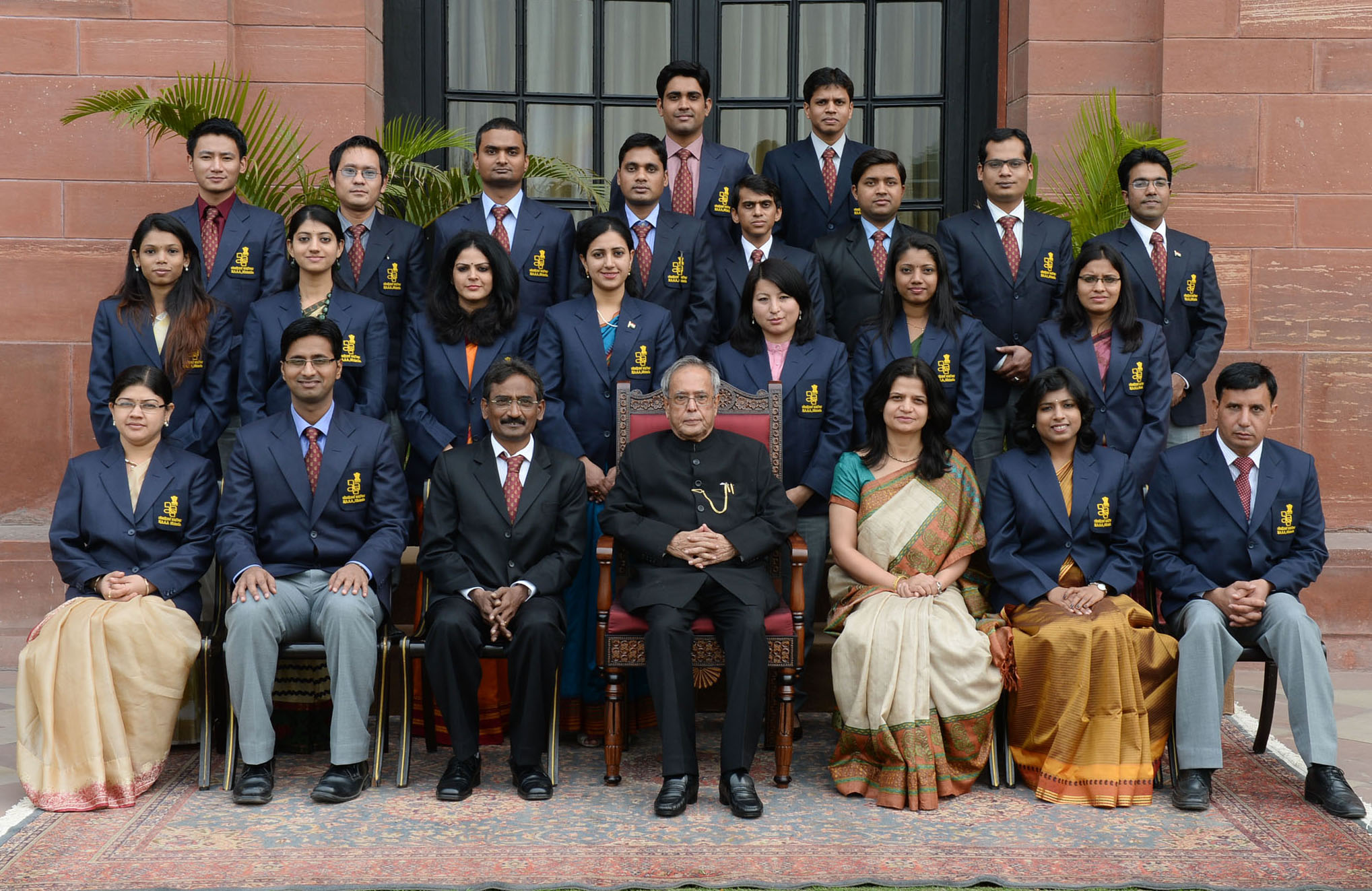
The President, Shri Pranab Mukherjee with the Trainees of the Indian Audit and Account Service of 2013 Batch from National Academy of Audit and Accounts, Shimla, at Rashtrapati Bhavan, in New Delhi on February 19 2014

After the selection process, IA&AS officers are first go to the LBSNAA for the Foundational Course. After three months later, they go to the National Academy of Audit and Accounts (NAAA) in Shimla, Himachal Pradesh for the professional training (Phase 1 and Phase 2), where they are referred to as Officer Trainees (OTs). The training spans 89 weeks, with 3 distinct phases of 51, 32, and 6 weeks. The first phase focuses on professional training, in which OTs are imparted theoretical knowledge on accounting, auditing and personnel administration. It also involves modules where they are attached to government bodies and academic institutes such as the Reserve Bank of India (RBI), Tata Institute of Social Sciences (TISS), Securities and Exchange Board of India (SEBI), National Institute of Public Finance and Policy (NIPFP), Bureau of Parliamentary Studies, Parliament of India, and IIM Ahmedabad.

The second phase consists of on-the-job training, where OTs are attached to offices of Accountant Generals and Accounts & Entitlement.

Finally, in the third phase, the OTs consolidate and reinforce the knowledge gained over the previous 2 phases. They are also given international exposure by attachment with the London School of Economics and UK's National Audit Office.

== Organization ==
Diplomatic Passport (left) and Official Passport (right). After the IFS, IA&AS officers receive some of the most extensive opportunities to serve abroad through official visits and diplomatic assignments.

The service is categorized into officers responsible for accounting and auditing functions related to the Union and state governments, and those assigned to the department's headquarters. State-level accounts and audit offices are led by Accountants General (AGs) or Principal Accountants General (PAGs), who hold equivalent responsibilities despite differing titles. Larger states typically have three PAGs or AGs, each overseeing specific domains: Accounts and Entitlement (which includes state accounts compilation, pension and loan account management), Cluster 1 (covering general administration, finance, health, water resources, rural development, and agriculture), and Cluster 2 (managing energy, industry, transport, urban development, environment, technology, public works, law enforcement, and culture).

At the central level, equivalent roles are designated as Principal Directors (PDs) or Directors General (DGs). These officers, along with AGs and PAGs, report to an Additional Deputy Comptroller and Auditor General (CAG) or Deputy CAG, who are among the highest-ranking officials in the service. At present, a key limitation is that IA&AS officers do not typically rise to the post of CAG, which is most often filled by retired IAS officers.

Upon completing training, officer trainees are assigned as Assistant Accountant Generals (AAGs) or Assistant Directors (ADs) in the Junior Grade (Group A). They are later promoted to Deputy Accountants General (DAGs) or Deputy Directors (DDs) in the Senior Time Scale. Further promotions lead to roles such as Senior Deputy Accountants General (Sr. DAGs) or Directors. Officers below the rank of AG or PD are referred to as Group Officers, as they typically oversee specific office divisions.

=== Career Progression ===
The IA&AS is the only Central Civil Services in which promotions occur very rapidly. For major positions such as Joint Secretary, an officer can attain the rank within 16 years of service, and for Additional Secretary, an officer is required to serve only 24 years. This is significantly faster than in the Indian Administrative Service (IAS) and the Indian Foreign Service (IFS), where promotions are also relatively quick, but not to the same extent. The positions and designations held by an IAAS officer in their career are as follows:

Ranks, designations, and positions held by Indian Audit and Accounts Service officers in their career
Grade / Scale (Level on Pay Matrix)	Posting in Indian Audit and Accounts Department	Position in Government of India	Position in Order of precedence in India	Pay Scale (Basic Pay)
Apex Scale (Pay Level 17)	Deputy Comptroller and Auditor General (Deputy CAG)	Secretary	23	₹225,000 (US$2,400)
Higher Administrative Grade + (Pay Level 16)	Additional Deputy Comptroller and Auditor General	Additional Secretary	25	₹205,400 (US$2,200)—₹224,400 (US$2,300)
Higher Administrative Grade (Pay Level 15)	Principal Accountant General / Director General	Additional Secretary	25	₹182,200 (US$1,900)—₹224,100 (US$2,300)
Senior Administrative Grade (Pay Level 14)	Accountant General / Principal Director	Joint Secretary	26	₹144,200 (US$1,500)—₹218,200 (US$2,300)
Selection Grade (Pay Level 13)	Senior Deputy Accountant General / Director	Director		₹123,100 (US$1,300)—₹215,900 (US$2,300)
Junior Administrative Grade (Pay Level 12)	Deputy Accountant General / Deputy Director	Deputy Secretary		₹78,800 (US$830)—₹209,200 (US$2,200)
Senior Time Scale (Pay Level 11)	Deputy Accountant General/Deputy Director	Under Secretary		₹67,700 (US$710)—₹208,700 (US$2,200)
Junior Time Scale (Pay Level 10)	Assistant Accountant General/ Assistant Director Entry-level (Probationer)	Assistant Secretary		₹56,100 (US$590)—₹177,500 (US$1,900)

== Notable Indian Audit and Accounts Service Officers ==
- V. Narahari Rao, the first Comptroller and Auditor General of India

== See also ==
- Auditing in India
