= Balaji Rao =

Balaji Rao may refer to:

- Balaji Baji Rao, Maratha Peshwa and general
- R. Balaji Rao, Indian politician
- Bajaji Rao Naik Nimbalkar, Maratha nobleman and
- Balaji Rao (Canadian cricketer), Indo-Canadian cricketer
- Balaji Rao (Indian cricketer), Indian cricketer
