= Pradeep Kumar =

Pradeep Kumar may refer to:

- Pradeep Kumar (actor) (1925–2001), Indian actor
- Pradeep Kumar (musician) (born 1986), Indian playback singer and music director
- Pradeep Kumar (civil servant) (born 1955), former Indian Administrative Service officer
- Pradeep Kumar (politician), Indian politician
