= Sunshine list =

Canadian political jargon; Canadian government practice

The Sunshine list is a Canadian political jargon referring to a listing of selected government or public sector workers with their salary and job title published by the government for transparency purposes. The colloquial moniker has in some circles attained term of art status, as it describes not only the list, but the legally mandated public disclosure exercise of compensation information of senior civil servants and executive leaders of institutions and organizations that are dependent on government fundings for their operations.

First formally implemented in Ontario in 1996, the mandatory disclosure of public sector pay information is an element of the broader freedom of information framework, and share the same philosophical underpinnings as other open government measures, that government belongs to the public and the public, generally in theory, has a right to government information. It is also expected that public disclosure contributes to a less corrupt, more efficient government by allowing broader scrutiny. Sunshine list is however distinct from other freedom of information element, in that it is expected to serve not only ultraistic purposes of accountability and transparency, but also to serve for more practical purposes of cost saving and value-for-money assessment.

The moniker pays homage to the proverb "Sunlight is the best disinfectant" and highlight the objective of transparency and of illuminating government expenditures. The colloquial term conveniently conveys a common understanding for a transparency process that could be, ironically, opaque in some aspects, and with a fair degree of implementation variations.

As of summer of 2026, eight of the ten provinces have established sunshine list, with a ninth provinces in the process of implementation. The government of Quebec is the only province with no ongoing salary disclosure. The federal Government of Canada also have not establish a sunshine list or similar system of salary disclosure.

== Cross-country summary ==
Province	Started	Threshold	# disclosed	Timing	Note
Ontario	1996	$100,000	404,922 (2025)	October	
Manitoba	1996	$85,000	~43,000 (2024)	Fall	
New Brunswick	2000	$80,000	~22,000 (2025)	June	
Saskatchewan	2005	$50,000	10,910 (2025)	October	Fiscal year ending March 31
British Columbia	2008	$125,000 $75,000	~153,000 (2025)	Summer	Fiscal year ending March 31 Through multiple parts
Alberta	2014	$159,833	~8,000 (2024)	June	Threshold adjusted annually
Nova Scotia	2016	$100,000	~17,000 (2025)	Summer	
Newfoundland and Labrador	2016	$100,000	13,802 (2025)	June	
Prince Edward Island	Legislation enacted May 2026				Disclosure of positions, not employees
Canada	No applicable legislation				
Quebec	No applicable legislation				

== History ==
=== Origin of sunshine ===
Sunshine has been associated with measures for government tranparency in the United States for a few decades prior to its prevalent association with government salary disclosure in Canada. Florida's Government in the Sunshine Law, passed in 1967 and remain in effect, requires that all meetings of any public body in Florida be open to the public, and the US federal government adopted legislation with the same name in 1976. Those American laws were occasionally referred to by Ontario journalists during the government consultation for freedom of information in late 1976.

As the first province to implement a sunshine list and the home of the largest media market, the origin story of the term revolved around the Ontario legislature. By the time most other provinces were considering their own salary disclosure regime, the colloquial term "sunshine list" had already attained default usage, term-of-art status by Ontario's press and political class. Given that Ontario's list was implemented in the early days of the Progressive Conservative (PC) Harris ministry by finance minister Ernie Eves, it is often mistaken as a key plank in the Common Sense Revolution that stormed Queen's Park in 1995, or as having been a campaign rallying call of the Harris Conservatives in the 1995 Ontario election.

It was actually Frank Miller – the Ontario premier who in 1985 elevated both future premiers Mike Harris and Ernie Eves to his short-lived ministry – who first associated the word sunshine specifically with government salary disclosure requirements. In 1982, Miller as then Ontario treasurer announced in his budget presentation speech plans for "sunshine law" requiring all public bodies under provincial jurisdiction to publish the salaries of employees making more than $30,000 . The legislation was however abandoned due to push back from public sectors union.

Sunshine did however re-emerged during the 1995 election campaign, somewhat ironically, due to Liberal leader Lyn McLeod pledging to bring "sunshine on public-sector pay" legislation within the first year of taking office. Cutting government waste was a core campaign focus for the PC Party that year, with an array of aggressive and eye-catching measured being pledged. Salary disclosure was comparatively modest and received only a passing mention in the Common Sense Revolution, the PC's platform book for that election.

While a salary disclosure system was in implemented in 1996, it would be a few more years still before "sunshine list" became the unmistakable moniker for public disclosure of government workers' salary. Following its implementation, politicians and journalists mentioned sunshine law occasionally to describe the disclosure requirement. The mention of the term "sunshine list" was recorded only once in the Hansard for the 36th and 37th Ontario Parliament (the period of PC government led by Harris and Eves), by legislature veteran Sean Conway, a former Liberal minister. The release of the list was widely reported annually but only once labeled "sunshine list" in a major dailies prior to 2003.

An inclusion of "sunshine list" in a Toronto Star headline reporting the 2003 list, the final release before the PC government's ouster later that year, brought the term out from government backrooms into the wider public's consciousness, and its usage exploded in the following year with over five thousands employees at the two power generating entities making the list. Since 2004, reliable annual spikes for "sunshine list" as a search term were recorded at the end of March and first few days of April, coinciding with the annual release of the Ontario list.

=== From publicly-traded companies to the public sector ===
Legislatively mandated public disclosure of salary started to attract public attention in the 1990s as Canada went through a period of economic downturn. Economic hardship and frequent news of layoffs led to more calls for greater transparency for executive compensation. Facing increasing criticism from the corporate sector about government spending during this period, Ontario Premier Bob Rae responded by demanding accountability from the corporate sector. The NDP government of Ontario instructed the Ontario Securities Commission in October 1993 to require companies listed in Toronto to disclosure salary of their of top executive. The measure was quickly replicated by British Columbia and Quebec.

In Alberta, Progressive Conservative Premier Ralph Klein won his first electoral mandate in June 1993 campaigning on a voluntary 5% public sector wage roll-back. After the election, The Klein ministry targeted the MUSHers – municipalities, universities, school boards and Hospitals – in which the province's auditor general had identified many instances of senior executives receiving above guidelines pay hikes while laying off workers – with legislation mandating the publication of the compensation paid to board members and senior executive of these sectors.

The pushes in both provinces elicited similar response from opposition demanding salary disclosure for politicians. In Alberta, the Liberal oppositions went after compensation for various government appointees on agencies and public boards. In Ontario, the Progressive Conservative opposition sought to expand disclosure to political aides and senior civil servants.

== Sunshine lists in individual jurisdictions ==
The formal names of the disclosure regime, the scopes of the applicable law and the disclosure mechanism vary from provinces to provinces. Since Canada is a confederation, the federal government and each of the ten provincial government determines whether to disclose, and if so, how. The reach of such a system is limited to the public sector workers under their specific jurisdiction. Accordingly, federal government employee based in provinces with sunshine lists are not subject to them.

As of summer of 2026, eight of the ten provinces have salary disclosure law and mechanism in place for ten or more years, and a ninth province adopted legislation with implementation underway. This leave the federal government and the government of Quebec as outliers with no disclosure system in place.

Even among the nine provinces with salary disclosure, the scope and the operations still vary. In most provinces, but not all, disclosure requirements extend to all "public sector" workers, or "MUSHers" as they were known in Alberta in 1990s (for municipalities, universities, school board, and hospitals). In Ontario, the law extend to private organizations that are recipients of government grants of certain size. Most provinces disclose simply the sum of renumeration without further context information (such as whether the worker worked the full year, or whether the figure included any lump sum or irregular payment), while other disclosed the annualized pay rate. In British Columbia, the data are released through multiple different means.

=== Alberta ===
Alberta first started publishing a sunshine list in 2014 following the 2012 election of Alison Redford. The introduction of the list followed public debate about the severance awarded to Redford's former chief of staff. In Alberta, the policy applies to deputy ministers, senior officials, political staff appointed under the Executive Assistant Order and employees defined under the Public Service Act who work for the offices of ministers and associate ministers, and who made an annual base salary of at least $100,000. The government began disclosing base salaries, benefit and severance amounts, and details of contract and termination agreements beginning on 31 January 2014. Information was to be posted online twice annually no later than 30 June (salaries and severances) and 31 December (severances in the latter half of the year) and included all staff employed as of 23 April 2012.

As of 2022, public sector bodies' employees are listed at salaries above $141,183, as Alberta indexes against inflation.

=== British Columbia ===
Public Sector salary disclosure in British Columbia comes from three sources.

Starting in 2008, public sector "organizations" are required to disclosure the compensation of their top five decision makers. The Public Sector Employee Act deems senior employees' employment contracts at public sector organizations to be public documents, and requires each organization to table a report that specifically disclose the total compensation for the chief executive officer and the four most senior executive decision makers earning a base salary of $125,000 or more. The same requirement for top five executives applies equally to all organization regardless of size. Given that there are only approximately 120 organizations subject to Public Sector Employee Act, this source provide disclosure for less than a thousand employee each year. These reports are disclosed as Public Sector Executive Compensation Disclosure Statements.

Separately, the Financial Information Act requires all public sector organization to include in its financial statements a listing of all employees earning more than $75,000 in total compensation. The listing of such employees employed directly by the British Columbia Public Services are tabled in a schedule in public account. (Note: See example for fiscal year 2024/2025) The listing for other organizations are contained in each organization's financial statements.

=== Manitoba ===
Manitoba was an early adopter of sunshine list, having implemented the measure just a few month after Ontario in 1996. The threshold is $85,000 since 2023.

=== New Brunswick ===
New Brunswick discloses public employees' salaries, sometimes only by position title or salary band, as opposed to specific names.

=== Newfoundland and Labrador ===
The government of Newfoundland and Labrador publishes a sunshine list annually since 2016 with a threshold of $100,000.

=== Nova Scotia ===
The government of Halifax has released a sunshine list annually since 2016.

=== Ontario ===
While the current form of sunshine list was instituted in Ontario the late 1990s, routine publication of salary of senior civil servants, in fact all civil servants, has a long history in Ontario. The government's public accounts now provide a summary listing of expense headings for every unit within every ministry. It was however not that long ago when it was possible for all expense payees, whether vendors or service providers, to be individually listed with amount paid to them. Such reporting for decades included all individual employees. From Confederation up until 1951, all civil servants including temporary employees were listed along with the total compensation paid to them that year. Starting from 1951, list of individual employees with annual salary less than $3,500 were omitted and presented in summary as "other salaries". (Note: For an example, see the salary listing of the Attorney General office for fiscal year 1951 on page 120 (B9), and the same listing for fiscal year 1952 on page 590 (B9).)

The threshold for inclusion was gradually raised to $30,000 in the early 1980s. When provincial treasurer Frank Miller proposed a "sunshine law" in 1982, he was merely proposing to broaden the application of the disclosure requirement to broader public sector funded by Ontario government such as hospitals and universities. After tabling it for first reading, however, the Public Remuneration Disclosure Act, 1982 was never spoke of again in the legislature. Facing pressure from teachers and civil servants unions, Miller took no further action and simply let the bill "go where the sun don't shine".

The routine salary disclosure of limit number of senior civil servants continued for a few more years, with the inclusion threshold gradually rising to $50,000 by 1987. That changed in 1988, when Liberal Treasurer Bob Nixon removed all salary listing from the public accounts of fiscal year 1988 on the ground of privacy. The document itself did not even acknowledge the monumental change. While NDP leader Bob Rae at the time took the position that top tier civil servants' pay should remain public, no action was taken when the NDP was in power. Accordingly, for a brief period from 1988 to 1996, the only salary figure accessible to the public were the pay rate of elected MPPs prescribed in legislations.

Following PC Party's victory in 1995, finance minister Ernie Eves bundled salary disclosure with 16 other bills on fiscal management. Unlike Liberal leader Lyn McLeod, who campaigned on the measure's accountability aspect in the preceding election, Eves present it as a key tool for measuring value for money. He did however made a point of referring it as “sunshine law” when he announced the measure. The government implemented salary disclosure with lightning speed, publishing Canada’s first sunshine list just 90 days after the omnibus legislation was assented, the list reporting five months worth of pay earned before his party’s election victory.

Ontario discloses all earners paid more than CA$100,000 annually. Its list is not indexed to inflation and the threshold has remained unchanged since 1996. The requirement extend to all recipient organizations of significant funding grants from the Ontario government.

=== Prince Edward Island ===
The government of Prince Edward Island adopted legislation for salary disclosure in 2026. The legislation specifically stress that disclosure is related to positions, not the person holding it.

=== Saskatchewan ===
Saskatchewan's crown investment corporation discloses all payments greater than CA$50,000 made by the government to employees or corporations.

=== Governments with no salary disclosure requirements ===
The federal Government of Canada and the Government of Quebec do not have legislatively mandated salary disclosure.

== Flaws and Criticisms ==
=== Questionable effectiveness in restraining cost ===
Compensation disclosure requirements were invariably introduced with promises on of it being a tool for restraining public service renumeration cost. The assumption, often unquestioned, is that salary disclosure would serve to mitigate against irregular compensation arrangements. They are expected to deter employees from seeking and managers from approving compensation package that were excessively generous. Its effectiveness however have not been extensively studied. Numerous commentator has argued that it is at least as likely to cause wage inflation as it provide high-value progressive workers with more information leverage. Public sector manager also have far less room to meaningfully performance manage.

=== Diminishing meaning ===
The most common criticism of salary disclosure regime was the largeness of some provinces sunshine list. Ontario's list for example have grown 90 folds from 4,500 individuals in 1996 to 404,900 in 2025. Many commentators have noted that the sheer size, the disparate seniority and pay range, and the lack of standardization in titles and rank render it meaningless. The list has been dismissed as a data dump as early as 2017. The unmitigated growth is rooted in successive governments refusal to raise the disclosure threshold with inflations or use some other method to maintain a meaningful threshold. A variety of commentators have identified concerns from this:

- Meaningful scrutiny – Allowing the list to grow to such size make it less likely for any analyst to meaningfully scrutinize the list, undermining the initial purpose for having the list.
- Meaningful inclusion – Many lower level ranked employees were included for reason such as length of service, willingness to take on overtime, etc

=== Enforcement failures ===
In 2011, Chris Mazza, President and CEO of Ornge, managed to stay off the sunshine list while making $1.4 million per year in a controversial scandal.

=== Personal privacy ===
Unions and professional associations representing different groups of civil servants have from time to time raised issues regarding personal privacy, and the potential danger the inclusion of full names and salary may pose.
