= Atul Khare =

Indian diplomat

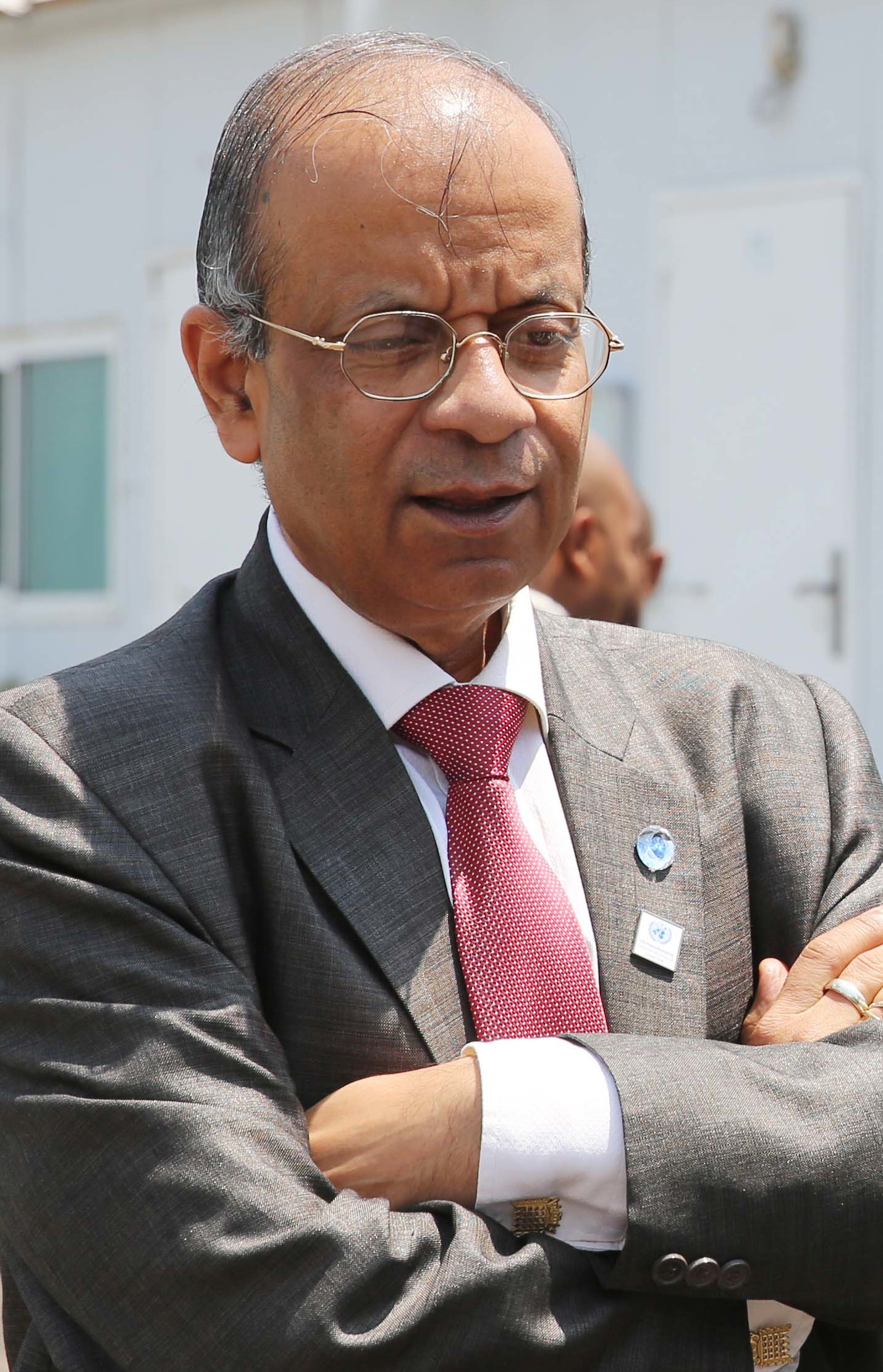
Atul Khare in 2016.

Atul Khare (born in 1959) is a career international diplomat and civil servant who currently serves as Under-Secretary-General of the United Nations in UN Department of Operational Support and previously as Under Secretary General in United Nations Department of Field Support and Assistant Secretary General for UN Peacekeeping Operations.

He also previously served as Special Representative of the Secretary-General for Timor-Leste and Head of the United Nations Integrated Mission in Timor-Leste (UNMIT) at the level of Under-Secretary-General (2006–2009), working earlier as Chief of Staff and Deputy Special Representative of the Secretary-General with the United Nations Mission of Support to East Timor (UNMISET).

== Early life and education ==
He was born in a religious Chitraguptvanshi Kayastha family and did his schooling from Kendriya Vidyalaya, Doranda, Ranchi. Passed out in 1975, with an all India rank in Higher Secondary Board Exam. He obtained a master's degrees in business administration and in leadership from the University of Southern Queensland, an advanced diploma (with distinction) in French from the Indian Defence School of Languages, a Bachelor of Medicine and a Bachelor of Surgery (with honours) from the All India Institute of Medical Sciences. He has a younger brother Amit Khare, who is a retired Indian Administrative Service (IAS).

== Diplomatic career ==
Khare started his career as an Indian diplomat in 1984. He has served in various capacities in the Indian Foreign Service, including as Deputy High Commissioner of India to Mauritius, Counsellor at the Permanent Mission of India to the United Nations in New York and Chargé d'affaires of the Indian Embassy in Senegal with concurrent accreditation to Mali, Mauritania, Gambia, Guinea Bissau and Cape Verde. He was Chef de Cabinet of the Foreign Secretary of India and of Director of the United Nations Division in the Ministry of External Affairs in New Delhi and served as Director of the Nehru Centre and Minister (Culture) of the High Commission of India to the United Kingdom from 2005.

== Career at the United Nations ==
Khare has served the United Nations in various capacities. He served as Chief of Staff and Deputy Special Representative of the Secretary-General with the United Nations Mission of Support to East Timor (UNMISET) from June 2002 until its completion in May 2005. In December 2006, Khare was appointed as the Special Representative of the Secretary-General and Head of the United Nations Integrated Mission in Timor-Leste (UNMIT), serving until December 2009. From 2010 to 2011, Khare served as the Deputy Head of the Department of Peacekeeping Operations in New York.

On 1 June 2011 UN Secretary-General Ban Ki-moon appointed Khare to spearhead efforts to implement a reform agenda aimed at streamlining and improving the efficiency of the world body. Khare, led the Change Management Team (CMT) at the UN, working with both departments and offices within the Secretariat and with other bodies in the UN system and the 193 member states. The CMT was tasked with guiding the implementation of a reform agenda at the UN that started with the devising of a wide-ranging plan to streamline activities, increase accountability and ensure the organization is more effective and efficient in delivering its many mandates.

Atul Khare was appointed United Nations Under-Secretary-General for Field Support on 7 January 2015. In early 2017, UN Secretary-General António Guterres appointed Khare to the 9-member High-Level Task Force to Improve the United Nations Approach for Preventing and Addressing Sexual Abuse.

== Other activities ==
- International Gender Champions (IGC), Member

== Honours ==
- Portugal: Grand Cross of the Order of Prince Henry (21 December 2009)
