= Mahratta Education Fund =

The Mahratta Education Fund (MEF) is a non-profit organization promoting the education of poor South Indian Marathi-speaking students It was founded on September 15, 1912.
