= Pratyush Sinha =

Indian civil servant

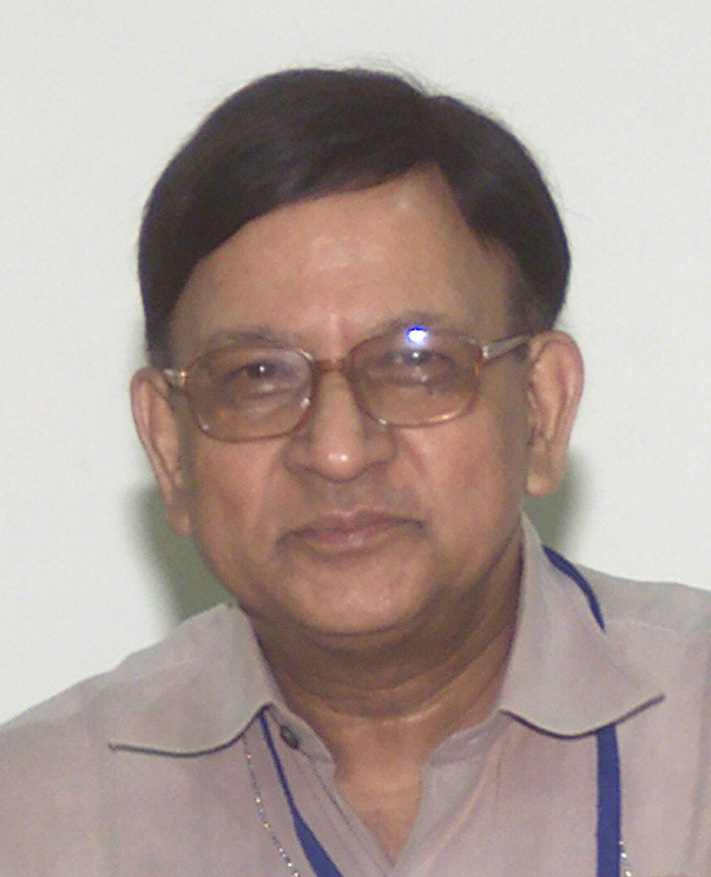
- Pratyush Sinha in 2006

Central Vigilance Commissioner of India
- In office 2006–2010
- Preceded by: P. Shankar
- Succeeded by: P.J.Thomas

Personal details
- Occupation: Civil Servant

Pratyush Sinha is a retired Indian bureaucrat and civil servant. He served as the Central Vigilance Commissioner of India from 2006 to 2010.

== Career ==
He is an Indian Administrative Service officer (1969 batch) of the Bihar cadre.
