= V. K. Shunglu =

Indian Administrative Service Officer

9th Comptroller and Auditor General of India
- In office 15 March 1996 – 14 March 2002
- Preceded by: C. G. Somiah
- Succeeded by: V. N. Kaul

V. K. Shunglu served as the ninth Comptroller and Auditor General of India. He is a 1962 batch Indian Administrative Service officer from the Madhya Pradesh cadre. He is a recipient of the Padma Bhushan in 2019 for his contribution to the civil services.

== Early life and education ==
Shunglu graduated with a bachelor's degree (honours) in economics from St. Stephen's College, Delhi in 1959, and received his master's degree in history from the University of Delhi in 1961.

== Career ==
Shunglu joined the Indian Administrative Service in 1962 from the Madhya Pradesh cadre. He has worked as Special Secretary in the Power ministry in 1993 and as Secretary, Health and Family Welfare in 1994. He also served as the Secretary, Department of Industrial Policy and Promotion in 1995 and as a member of the Foreign Investment Promotion Board. He was appointed as the 9th Comptroller and Auditor General of India in 1996 and served in the position till his retirement in 2002.

== Post-retirement ==
He is among the founding members of the India Rejuvenation Initiative, an anti-corruption forum formed by retired bureaucrats. He has also been a member of many committees including the inquiry commission into the Commonwealth Games scandal and the Shunglu Committee which examined charges of irregularities in government appointments in the state of Delhi. He also headed the committee to assess the rehabilitation of people displaced by the construction of the Sardar Sarovar Dam and the committee to look into the proposal by Indian Institutes of Managements for increasing their fees. He is a member of and is the Current chairman of Delhi Public School Society since 2014. He was conferred the Padma Bhushan in 2019 for his contributions to the civil services.
