= Amit Khare =

Secretary to the Vice President of India

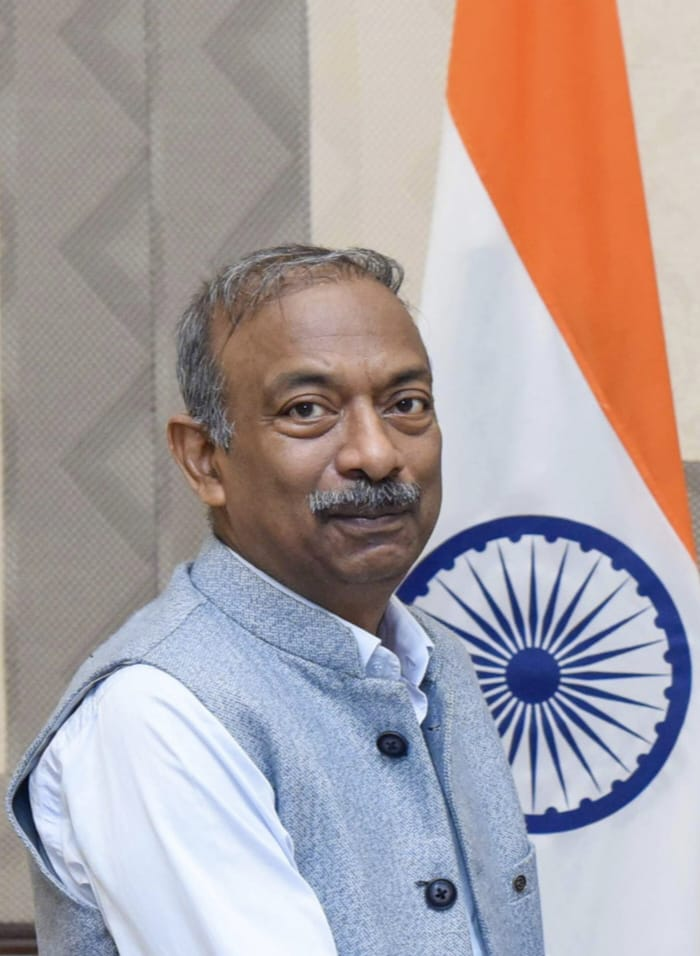
- Shri Amit Khare at the Vice President’s Enclave, in New Delhi on September 15, 2025.

Secretary to the Vice President of India
- Incumbent
- Assumed office 15 September 2025
- Preceded by: Sunil Kumar Gupta

Advisor to the Prime Minister of India
- In office 12 October 2021 – 14 September 2025
- Preceded by: Amarjeet Sinha

Secretary, Higher Education
- In office 14 December 2019 – 30 September 2021
- Preceded by: R. Subrahmanyam
- Succeeded by: K Sanjay Murthy

Personal details
- Born: 14 September 1961 (age 65) Nagpur, India
- Education: (BS) St Stephen's College; Delhi University (MBA) IIM Ahmedabad
- Occupation: Retired IAS Officer

Amit Khare (born 14 September 1961) is a retired 1985 batch IAS officer of Bihar and Jharkhand cadre who is the Secretary to the Vice President of India and the CEO of Sansad TV. He is noted for his role in bringing to light the Fodder scam, in which Rs. 940 crores were embezzled in Bihar over many years, and successive chief ministers Jagannath Mishra and Lalu Yadav have been imprisoned.

== Early life and education ==
He was born in a religious Chitraguptvanshi Kayastha family and did his schooling at Kendriya Vidyalaya, Hinoo in 1977 and then finished his Bachelor of Science degree from St. Stephen's College, Delhi of Delhi University and also holds an MBA from IIM Ahmedabad. He has an elder brother Atul Khare, who is an Indian Foreign Service officer.

== Career ==
In late 1995, Bihar was in a financial crunch. The then charismatic yet 'native' leader Lalu Prasad Yadav was the Chief Minister of undivided Bihar, where the then finance commissioner VS Dubey stumbled upon the financial irregularities of massive scale. In December 1995, Dubey was, as part of his job, reviewing the performance of various departments. He found that money was withdrawn in excess of the allocation by some of the department. Khare, who was then District Magistrate at Chaibasa, noted that the district animal husbandry department had withdrawn Rs 10 crore and Rs 9 crore twice without giving any details. Even when questioned, there was no response from the animal husbandry department. Finally, in January 1996, Khare visited the office to investigate, and found it looking as if "someone had tried to destroy files in a hurry". Many bogus bills were for amounts just under Rs. 10 lakhs (when there are more stringent authorization norms). It seemed that such payments had been going on for years. The next day, simultaneous raids conducted at Ranchi and elsewhere found similar practices. This was the first evidence of the scam, which gathered momentum after regional CBI director U. N. Biswas defied political pressures to pursue the case up to the chief minister level. Those convicted include the preceding DM of Chaibasa, IAS officer Sajal Chakraborty.

Khare has interests in Education and has served the State Elementary education secretary for several terms, and has also worked at the Ministry of Human Resource Development at the center. He also been a vice-chancellor of the Ranchi University. He helped introduce the National Education Policy 2020 which was approved by the cabinet on 29 July 2020. He has also served as principal secretary to Jharkhand governor Ved Marwah, and as Collector and DM, Patna.

He has served as Secretary in the Ministry of Information and Broadcasting. On 14 December 2019, he assumed charge as Secretary, Ministry of Education (Department of Higher Education) with additional charge of School Education - in background of ongoing negotiations with JNU students regarding fee hike and campus lockdown and served there till 30 September 2021. After this, he was appointed advisor to Prime Minister of India on 12 October 2021 and served there till 14 September 2025. Thereafter, he was appointed as Secretary to the Vice President of India on 15 September 2025.
