= N. Vittal =

Indian civil servant (1938–2023)

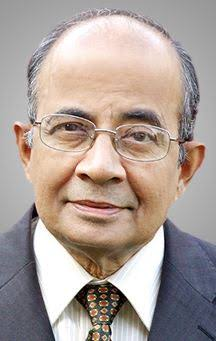

Nagarajan Vittal (31 January 1938 – 4 August 2023) was an Indian civil servant majorly known for his work as central vigilance commissioner in the Government of India. He worked at positions at the state and central government level, primarily in the fields of industrial administration, science and technology, and security, as well as posts within public-private sector joint enterprises. He was awarded the Padma Bhushan, India's third highest civilian award, in 2012.

== Early life and education ==
A Maharashtrian Deshastha Madhwa Brahmin, Vittal was born in Thiruvananthapuram, the capital of Kerala. He did his education from Tiruchirapalli and Madras (now Chennai), graduated with a BSc (Hons.) in Chemistry from Loyola College in 1958. After a short time as a lecturer in Jamal Mohamed College, Tiruchirapalli, he joined the Indian Administrative Service on 16 May 1960, with Gujarat Cadre.

== Career ==
Vittal was part of the Indian Administrative Service's 1960 intake. He worked as development commissioner, tasked with reviving the Port of Kandla Special Economic Zone for the Indian government's Department of Commerce. He worked as Industries commissioner for the Gujarat state government, in which he was responsible for Gujarat reaching full coverage with District Industries Centres; setting up the single window service for the industry promotion bureau (IndexTB), later adopted by other states; and setting up the Entrepreneurship Development Centre. He later worked as Food and Civil Supplies secretary, setting up the Gujarat State Civil Supplies Corporation; chairman of the Gujarat State Civil Supplies Corporation; and Health and Family Welfare secretary. He then worked as managing director of Gujarat Narmada Valley Fertilisers Company (GNFC), before returning to the Gujarat state government to serve as additional chief secretary, where he initiated proposals for setting up the Gujarat Police Housing Corporation.

From there he switched to positions working for the Government of India, as additional secretary at the Department of Atomic Energy, then secretary at the Department of Electronics, where he initiated policies for boosting software, setting up software technology parks and special economic zones, and strategic cooperation with industry, including Foreign Direct Investment (FDI) from IBM, Motorola, and others. He then became chair of the Telecoms Commission, where he worked on liberalisation of the telecom sector and was involved in the National Telecom Policy of 1994, and secretary at the Department of Telecommunications. He followed this with a stint as chair of the Public Enterprises Selection Board, heading the Committee on Guidelines for the Public Sector (1997), under the auspices of the Ministry of Industry, Department of Public Enterprises, which removed 696 regulations hampering the autonomy of PSEs. His final post was central vigilance commissioner.

Over the course of his career he worked as a leader for number of committees, expert groups and task forces, including:

- Expert Group on IT in Government, Department of Personnel, Government of India.
- Task Force on Technology Exports, Department of Scientific and Industrial Research, Government of India.
- Task Force on Telecom and Information Technology, Federation of Indian Chambers of Commerce & Industry
- Expert Committee on Tamil Nadu Institute of Information Technology, Government of Tamil Nadu.

Vittal was also the part of 1989 Fall Senior Executives Programme at the Massachusetts Institute of Technology (MIT) in the United States.

== Personal life ==
Vittal was married and had a son and a daughter.

Vittal was actively interested in management and cultural activities and had membership in the following social, cultural, and professional associations:

- President (1994–1997) Loyola Alumni Association (North India Chapter), New Delhi
- President (1991–1997) Shri Shanmukhananda Sangeetha Sabha, New Delhi
- Member (1991–1998) Board of Governors, Academy of Human Resource Development, Ahmedabad

Vittal died on 4 August 2023, at the age of 85.

== Awards and honours ==
Vittal received the Padma Bhushan in 2012. Among other honours, he received the following:

- Honorary Fellow, Computer Society of India (1992)
- Honorary Fellow of the IETE
- Citation of gratitude from Electronic Component Industry Association (ELCINA), New Delhi
- Dataquest IT Man of the Year 1993
- Honorary Fellow, Asia Electronics Union (1995)
- Honorary Fellow, Institution of Electronics and Telecommunication Engineers (1997)
- The hidden talent of India award by the Organisation for Industrial, Spiritual and Cultural Advancement (OISCA) International, a UN Status Category I NGO
- The Great Son of the Soil Award 1998 by All India Conference of Intellectuals
- For the Sake of Honour, Rotary's highest Award (April 1999)
- Honorary Member, Indian Institute of Industrial Engineering (December 1999)
- Honour of "Desa Seva Ratnam", conferred by Jagadguru Sri Sankaracharya of Kanchi Kamakoti Peetam (April 2001)
- H H Sri Paramacharya Man of the Year Award (2000), awarded by the Centenarian Trust, Chennai. (April 2001)
- V Krishnamurthy Award For Excellence (June 2001) – by the Centre for Organisation Development, Hyderabad
- Giants International Award for public administration (September 2001)
- Great Maratha Award for Lifetime achievement by The Maharashtra Association, Chennai (2005)
- Tamil Nadu Governor Late Dr M Chenna Reddy Award (March 2002) for outstanding service by Federation of Doctors, Hospitals & Health Care Industry (FEDDHI)
- Included in the list of "Fifty men and women who shaped the economy" in the fifty years after India’s independence by the Business Today magazine (August 1997)

== Books and publications ==
Vittal wrote more than 400 articles on various subjects relating to management, public relations, human resources development, management of technology, and public sector management in many journals and magazines. These include Economic and Political Weekly, The Financial Express, The Times of India, Business India, and the Journals of the IIMA, LBS National Academy of Administration, HCPS, RIPA, and IIFT. He was a regular columnist for The Economic Times and the Web magazine "Rediff on the Net."

His bibliography includes:

- India Incorporated: Reflections on the Indian Electronics Industry (1994)
- The Vicious Cycle of Vittal's Law (1994)
- The Red Tape Guerrilla (1995)
- Fighting Corruption and Restructuring Government (2000)
- Public Sector Management & Governance (2001) – with S. Mahalingam
- Information Technology: India's Tomorrow (2001)
- Ideas for Action (2002)
- Vittal’s Vital Management Mantra (2004)
- Maharastrians in Tamil Nadu (2004)
- Musings on Governance, Governing and Corruption (2004)
- Technology and a Vision for the future (2004)
- More musings on Governance, Governing and Corruption (2005)
- Roots of Effective Governance (2007)
- Corruption in India: The Road block for national prosperity (2002)
- Roots of effective governance (2007)

Vittal also edited Export Processing Zones in Asia: Some Dimensions, published by the Asian Productivity Organization in 1977.
