= Banks Board Bureau =

Autonomous body of the Government of India

Financial Service Institution Bureau
Agency overview
- Formed: April 1, 2016
- Dissolved: June 30, 2022
- Jurisdiction: Govt of India
- Parent department: Ministry of Finance, Government of India
- Website: https://banksboardbureau.org.in/

Banks Board Bureau (BBB) (now replaced by Financial Services Institution Bureau since 2022) was an autonomous body of the Government of India tasked to search and select appropriate personages for the Board of Public Sector Banks, Public Sector Financial Institutions, and Public Sector Insurance Companies and recommend measures to improve Corporate Governance in these Institutions. In 2022, it was replaced by Financial Services Institutions Bureau(FSIB) with chairman and mandate remaining the same, in response to a Delhi High court order rendering BBB as incompetent.

== Overview ==
The mandate of the Bureau includes:

- To recommend the selection and appointment of Board of Directors in Nationalised Banks, Financial Institutions and Public Sector Insurance Companies (Whole Time Directors and chairman);
- To advise the Central Government on matters relating to appointments, confirmation or extension of tenure and termination of services of the Directors of mandated institutions;
- To advise the Central Government on the desired management structure of mandated institutions, at the level of Board of Directors and senior management;
- To advise the Central Government on a suitable performance appraisal system for mandated institutions;
- To build a data bank containing data relating to the performance of mandated institutions and their officers;
- To advise the Central Government on formulating and enforcing a code of conduct and ethics for managerial personnel in mandated institutions.
- To advise the Central Government on evolving suitable training and development programs for managerial personnel in mandated institutions
- To help the banks in terms of developing business strategies and capital raising plans and the like;
- Any other work the Government assigns in consultation with the Reserve Bank of India.

The Central Government notified the amendment to the Nationalised Banks (Management and Miscellaneous Provisions) Scheme, 1980 providing the legal framework for the composition and functions of the Banks Board Bureau on March 23, 2016. The Bureau started functioning as an autonomous recommendatory body on April 1, 2016.

The BBB works as a step towards governance reforms in Public Sector Banks (PSBs) as recommended by the P.J. Nayak Committee.It is housed in RBI's Byculla Office in Mumbai.

== List of Chairperson ==
Chairperson
Name	Tenure Began	Tenure end
Vinod Rai	2016	2018
Bhanu Pratap Sharma	2018	2022

== See also ==
- List of financial supervisory authorities by country
