= Pradeep Kumar (civil servant) =

Indian Administrative Service officer (born 1949)

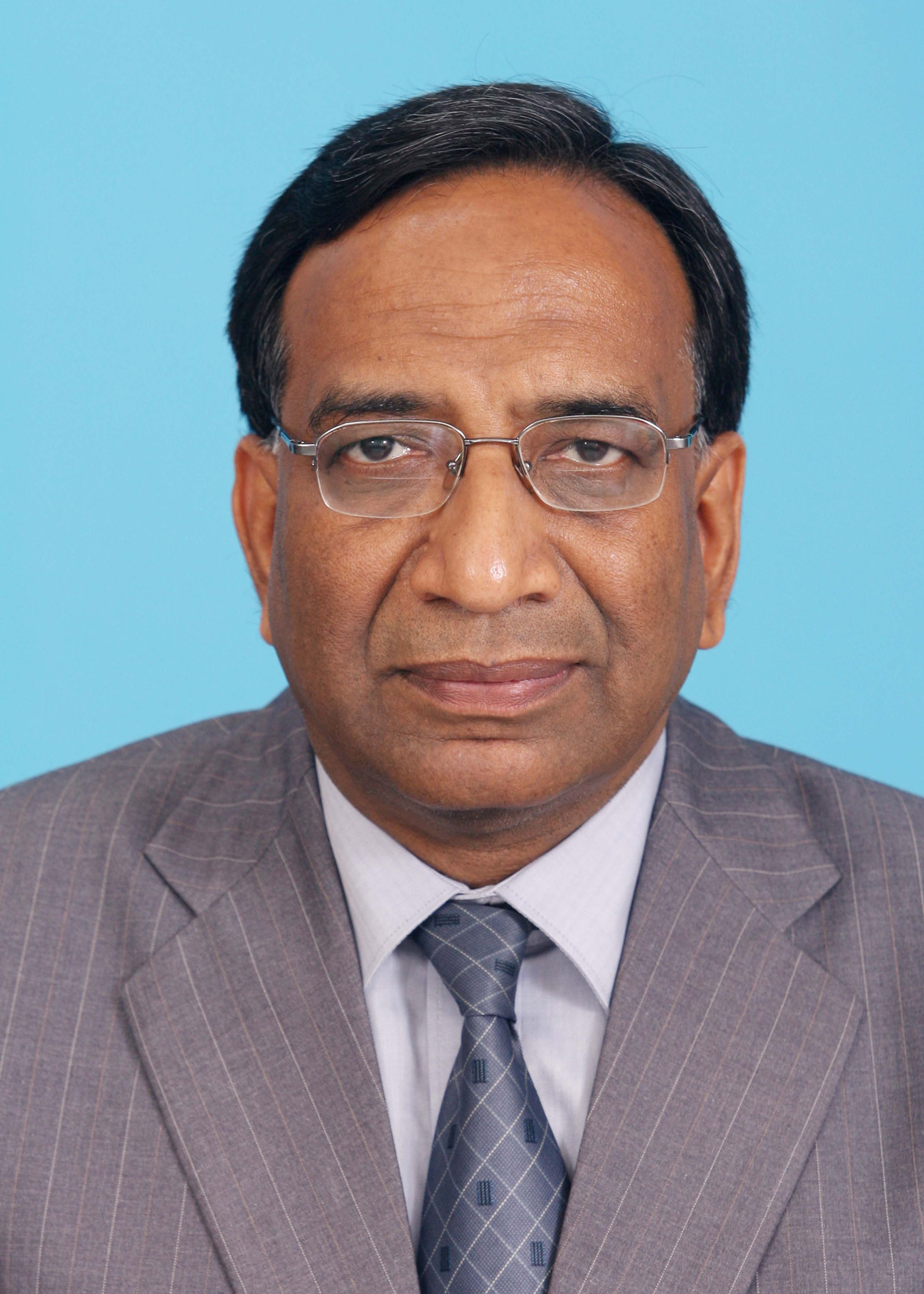
- IAS Haryana Cadre 1972

15th Central Vigilance Commissioner
- In office 31 July 2011 – 28 September 2014
- Deputy: R Sri Kumar (Vigilance Commissioner)
- Preceded by: P. J. Thomas (Indian administrative officer)
- Succeeded by: Rajiv

Personal details
- Born: 29 September 1949 (age 76)

Pradeep Kumar (born 29 September 1949) is a former Indian Administrative Service (IAS) officer, 1972 batch, of the Haryana cadre, who served as Defense Secretary, in the Ministry of Defence, Government of India, for a term of two years, from August 2009 to July 2011. He succeeded Vijay Singh, IAS, 1970 batch, who, on superannuation, was appointed member of the UPSC. In July 2011, on superannuation, he was appointed chief vigilance commissioner of India where he served till September 2014.

== Background ==
Pradeep Kumar obtained a graduate degree in Electrical Engineering from the Indian Institute of Technology, Delhi, and Masters in Economics and Social Studies from the University of Wales, United Kingdom.

== Career path ==
- In the Government of Haryana he served as Director of Industries, Principal Secretary, Power, Irrigation, Science and Technology, Town and Country Planning and Urban Estates departments.
- In the Government of India he served as joint secretary in the Department of Heavy Industry, additional secretary in the Ministry of Coal, chairman, National Highways Authority of India, and secretary (Disinvestment) in the Ministry of Finance. He has also served on the boards of Bharat Heavy Electricals, Maruti Udyog, Andrew Yule Ltd, Hindustan Paper Corporation Ltd, Coal India Ltd and Neyvelli Lignite Corporation.
- In the Ministry of Defense, he was secretary (Defence Production), and defense secretary. He was succeeded by Shashi Kant Sharma, Bihar cadre, 1975 batch, as defense secretary (14 July 2011 – 22 May 2013), who on superannuation was appointed Comptroller and Auditor General of India.

== Employment after superannuation ==
On superannuation Pradeep Kumar was appointed chief vigilance commissioner of India, a statutory appointment, who is head of the Central Vigilance Commission. He assumed the office from 31 July 2011. The chief vigilance commissioner has a fixed term of four years or until reaching the age of 65, whichever is earlier.
