= V. N. Kaul =

Indian civil servant

Vijayendra Nath Kaul

10th Comptroller and Auditor General of India
- In office 2002–2008
- President: APJ Abdul Kalam
- Preceded by: V. K. Shunglu
- Succeeded by: Vinod Rai

Personal details
- Born: 7 January 1943 (age 83)
- Education: St. Stephen's College, Delhi; Delhi University
- Awards: Padma Bhushan
- Website: vnkaul.in

Vijayendra Nath Kaul was the tenth Comptroller and Auditor General of India (CAG) from 2002 to 2008. He was awarded the Padma Bhushan in 2014.

== Early life and background ==
Vijayendra Nath Kaul started school at Presentation Convent in Srinagar but after a couple of months he was moved to Delhi Public School in Delhi. He completed Senior Cambridge in 1959 from St. Joseph's Academy, Dehradun. He got his B.A. (Hons) and M.A. degrees from St. Stephen's College, University of Delhi in 1964 and he joined the Indian Administrative Service in 1965. Kaul was allocated the Madhya Pradesh cadre of the IAS and began his civil service career as Assistant Collector, Bilaspur District in the then State of Madhya Pradesh. His other field postings in Madhya Pradesh were Collector and District Magistrate, Shahdol District, Collector and District Magistrate, Durg District and Commissioner, Indore Division.

== Civil service career ==
Kaul has worked at senior levels in government and in the United Nations. He served in the Indian Administrative Service up to 2002 and retired as Secretary, Ministry of Petroleum and Natural Gas on being appointed the Comptroller and Auditor General of India. Prior to serving as Petroleum Secretary he was Secretary in the Ministry of Chemicals and Fertilizers and the Ministry of Coal. Earlier, he was Finance Secretary, Secretary, Commerce and Industry and Principal Secretary, Finance and Home Departments of the Government of Madhya Pradesh.

He has been Chairman of public sector and joint sector companies in Madhya Pradesh and in the Government of India including Chairman, Petronet LNG.

== United Nations ==
Kaul has had two stints in the United Nations. He was Regional Adviser, Trade Policy with United Nations-ESCAP at Bangkok, Thailand from 1991 to 1998. He served for a second time in the United Nations from 2008 to 2011 as Vice-Chairman of the United Nations Independent Audit Advisory Committee, New York, a subsidiary body of UN General Assembly.

== Comptroller and Auditor General of India ==
As C&AG, Kaul modernized and strengthened public audit in India. He introduced seminal reforms in audit practices by promulgating, for the first time clear guidelines on the extent and scope of audit and by developing an internationally benchmarked methodology for performance auditing. He believed that technology,especially cognitive technology, robotic process automation and data analytics will play an increasing role in determining the effectiveness of public accounting and auditing activity in India. Two other major policy initiatives taken by him are still works in progress. The first was the need for department wise Audit Committees and for greater functional autonomy for Internal Audit. The second was to move the arcane pure cash based government accounting system in India to a modified accrual system in order to achieve greater government transparency, accountability and better financial management.The Finance Commission agreed with his views and the Government Accounting Standards Advisory Board (GASAB) was established.

Kaul was on the panel of external auditors of the United Nations from 2002 to 2007. He was elected to audit the WHO. Kaul was also the External Auditor of the Food and Agriculture Organization, Rome, the International Maritime Organization (IMO), London, and, the World Tourism Organization, Madrid.

From 2002 to 2008 he was Secretary-General of ASOSAI. and the Chairman of the INTOSAI's IT Audit Committee.

He has been a member of the Eminent Persons Advisory Group of the Competition Commission of India Kaul was also a member of the Oversight Committee constituted in February 2013 for monetisation of immovable assets of Air India and to advise on the process of valuation and sale of saleable assets of the Airline.
