= C. G. Somiah =

Comptroller of India (1931–2010)

C G Somiah

8th Comptroller and Auditor General of India
- In office 1990–1996
- Preceded by: T. N. Chaturvedi
- Succeeded by: V. K. Shunglu

Personal details
- Born: 11 March 1931 Kodagu, India
- Died: 13 September 2010 (aged 79) Bangalore, India
- Spouse: Indira Somiah
- Education: Loyola College, University of Madras; University of Oxford
- Occupation: IAS Officer (1953–1996)

C. G. Somiah served as the eighth Comptroller and Auditor General of India who was known for his honesty and for his impeccable career record. He wrote a best-seller autobiography 'The honest always stand alone'. He had a long career as an IAS officer first in the state of Orissa and next in five central ministries (defense, finance, company affairs, planning and home affairs) of India.

== Orissa cadre ==
Somiah was first posted as Assistant commissioner in Orissa.

In Orissa as State Forest Secretary, he took a principled stand against granting concessions to contractors of the Kendu leaf (a minor forest produce used for wrapping beedis) commodity.

== Union Government ==
Somiah was deputed to the Central Government in New Delhi where he had an uninterrupted 15-year stint in various Bhavans (Government houses and offices) on Raisina Hill until 1996. Somiah worked in association with policy makers including Nani Palkivala and Ashoke Kumar Sen. Once Dhirubhai Ambani tried to test his integrity by offering him some shares in Reliance out of the promoter's quota. Somiah bluntly refused him.

He was the financial controller of the Asian Games Organising committee in the 1982 Asian Games held in New Delhi. In 1983 he was appointed Secretary Department of Company Affairs and Chairman of the Company Law Board.

While he had a stint in the department of Company Affairs, the exemption limit under the Monopolies and Restrictive Trade Practices (MRTP) Act was raised. So accordingly, when Somiah later became the Home Secretary he found his office room was bugged. He summoned the individual responsible for this and chastised him.

Later when India purchased Czech pistols, Somiah found them to be defective. He worked through the diplomatic channels and got the price refunded from the foreign seller. But he was unnecessarily suspected and a probe was instituted after which he was found to be innocent.

=== Planning Commission ===
He was made Secretary of the Planning Commission when Dr. Manmohan Singh was its chairman. He was the Home Secretary under Rajiv Gandhi. He had advised the Central Government during the formulation of the Seventh Five-Year Plan and in deciding the allocation of financial resources for the various State Plans.

=== Home Secretary ===
He was later made Secretary, Ministry of Home Affairs. As Home Secretary, he led a delegation to Pakistan in 1987 to discuss counter terrorism and the control of narcotics.

He was also involved in Operation Black Thunder, in fighting terrorism in Punjab and in flushing out terrorists from the Golden Temple. He later paid a visit to the Golden Temple with his wife, to pray and to pay his respects, while his superiors supposedly overlooked the need to do so. His act helped assuage the tense situation in Amritsar.

He was also involved in controlling the disturbances that occurred in Darjeeling. He was closely involved in signing the Punjab, Assam, Mizo and Gorkhaland accords. On 22 August 1988, the Darjeeling Gorkha Hill Council Treaty was signed inside the throne room in Kolkata's Raj Bhavan by Subhash Ghising (GNLF Chief) on behalf of Darjeeling Gorkhas, C. G. Somiah (Central Home Secretary) on behalf of the Indian Union and Rathindranath Sengupta (Chief Secretary of West Bengal) on behalf the West Bengal State. Home Minister Buta Singh and West Bengal Chief Minister Jyoti Basu stood as witnesses. In October 1988, Somiah was made the Central Vigilance Commissioner.

When he was part of the home ministry, he rejected the suggestion to ban the religious right of the Coorgs (Kodavas) and the people of Coorg (Kodagu) to possess guns. This religious right is similar to that of the Sikhs to hold the kirpans.

Somiah was as renowned for his modesty as he was for his uprightness. He would dine modestly with his family and drive his personal Maruthi car while not flaunting his status as home secretary. When he once missed a red signal once, he promptly paid the fine on the spot to the constable without making any fuss.

=== CAG ===
He was sworn in by the President of India in 1990 to serve a six-year term as Comptroller and Auditor General of India (CAG). He served as the CAG between 27 March 1990 and 11 March 1996. The CAG is ranked 9th in India according to the Indian order of precedence and has the same status as a judge of the Supreme Court of India. As CAG he headed the financial audits of the Central Government, the 26 States and 5 Union Territories of India.

=== Chairman of the UN Board of Auditors ===
Between 1993 and 1996, he was the Chairman of Asian Organisation of Supreme Audit Institution (ASOSAI). He was also elected to the United Nations Board of Auditors for a three-year term from July 1993. In January 1995, he became the Chairman of the UN Board of Auditors or the UN Audit Committee (the first Indian to become so).

== Retirement ==
He retired in 1996. In November 2000, the Karnataka state honoured him with the Rajyotsava Prashasti (Rajyotsava award).

== Autobiography ==
His autobiography 'The honest always stand alone', by Niyogi Publishers, was launched by former President of India Dr. A P J Abdul Kalam in New Delhi on 15 July 2010.

== Death ==
He died on 13 September 2010 after a brief illness. His funeral was attended by several fans, well-wishers and relatives.

== Family ==
He was survived by his wife Indira, son Anand and daughter Pria Alva (the daughter-in-law of Margaret Alva).
