= Salaries of government officials in India =

Salaries of government leaders and government officials in India

Following is a list of officials in the Indian government, along with their respective position or designation in the Indian order of precedence and the salaries and various allowances and emoluments given to them according to legislation. The President of India has a net salary of ₹500,000 (US$5,200) per month, followed by the Vice President with ₹400,000 (US$4,200), and the Prime Minister at ₹280,000 (US$2,900). Governors receive ₹350,000 (US$3,700). The Chief Justice of India earns ₹280,000 (US$2,900) while Supreme Court judges receive ₹250,000 (US$2,600). Members of Parliament have a base salary of ₹124,000 (US$1,300) plus other allowances.

The Chief Ministers of Indian states have varying salaries, with Telangana's Chief Minister earning the highest at ₹400,000 (US$4,200) per month. Other states like Delhi, Uttar Pradesh, and Maharashtra follow with salaries of ₹390,000 (US$4,100), ₹365,000 (US$3,800), and ₹340,000 (US$3,500) respectively. The lowest salaries for Chief Ministers are found in Nagaland and Tripura, with ₹110,000 (US$1,100) and ₹105,000 (US$1,100) respectively. The salaries of Members of the Legislative Assembly (MLAs) and Members of the Legislative Council (MLCs) also vary by state. Each state determines the basic pay for its MLAs and MLCs, which can differ significantly across the country.

== Table of salaries ==
Overall, the salaries of these officials include various allowances and emoluments, which are fixed according to their respective positions and responsibilities.

Position in the Indian order of precedence	Post	Net Salary per month (including other emoluments and allowances)	All emoluments and allowances	References
1	President	₹500,000 (US$5,200)	+ Other allowances fixed to the President.	
2	Vice President	₹400,000 (US$4,200)	+ Other allowances fixed to the Vice President.	
3	Prime Minister	₹280,000 (US$2,900)	+ Other allowances fixed to the Prime Minister.	
4	Governors	₹350,000 (US$3,700)	+ Other allowances fixed to Governors.	
6	Chief Justice	₹280,000 (US$2,900)	Not Applicable	
9	Judges of the Supreme Court	₹250,000 (US$2,600)	Not Applicable	
9A	Chief Election Commissioner	₹250,000 (US$2,600)	Not Applicable	
9A	Comptroller and Auditor General	₹250,000 (US$2,600)	Not Applicable	
9A	Chairperson of the Union Public Service Commission	₹250,000 (US$2,600)	Not Applicable	
11	Attorney General	₹250,000 (US$2,600)	Not Applicable	
11	Cabinet Secretary	₹250,000 (US$2,600)	Not Applicable	
11	Chiefs of Staff (Army, Air, Naval) in the rank of General and equivalent ranks in the Indian Armed Forces	₹250,000 (US$2,600)	Not Applicable	
14	Chief Justices of High Courts	₹250,000 (US$2,600)	Not Applicable	
16	Judges of High Courts	₹225,000 (US$2,300)	Not Applicable	
21	Member of Parliament	₹124,000 (US$1,300) (Note: In addition to the basic pay of 124,000, they also get a constituency allowance of ₹87,000 and office allowances of ₹75,000. This makes the total salary amounting to ₹286,000.)	+ Other allowances fixed to MPs.	
23	Secretaries to the Union Government; Vice Chief of Army Staff/Vice Chief of Air Staff/Vice Chief of Naval Staff/Commanders in the rank of Lieutenant General or equivalent ranks in the Indian Armed Forces; Solicitor General; Secretary General of the Supreme Court; Secretary General of the Lok Sabha; Secretary General of the Rajya Sabha	₹225,000 (US$2,300)	Not Applicable	
23	Chief Secretaries to State Governments	₹225,000 (US$2,300)	Not Applicable	
25	Director General of Police (Head of Police Force); Director of Central Bureau of Investigation; Director of the Intelligence Bureau; Director Generals of Central Armed Police Forces	₹225,000 (US$2,300)	Not Applicable	
25	Additional Secretaries to the Union Government; Registrar General/Registrar of the Supreme Court	₹182,200 (US$1,900) (Minimum Pay) to ₹224,100 (US$2,300) (Maximum Pay)	Not Applicable	
25	Principal Secretaries to State Governments; Members of State Public Service Commissions; Registrar Generals/Registrars of High Courts	₹182,200 (US$1,900) (Minimum Pay) to ₹224,100 (US$2,300) (Maximum Pay)	Not Applicable	
26	Joint Secretaries to the Union Government; Major General and equivalent ranks in the Indian Armed Forces; Additional Registrars of the Supreme Court; Inspector General of Police	₹144,200 (US$1,500) (Minimum Pay) to ₹218,200 (US$2,300) (Maximum Pay)	Not Applicable	
26	Secretaries to State Governments	₹144,200 (US$1,500) (Minimum Pay) to ₹218,200 (US$2,300) (Maximum Pay)	Not Applicable	

== Chief Ministers ==
The net salary of the Chief Ministers varies from state to state. The following table shows the basic pay of CM of each state of India in decreasing order from top to bottom.

Net Salary of Chief Minister of all states as of 2019
State	CM Net Salary per month (Note: This salary includes the Basic Pay, Dearness Allowance and House Rent Allowance.) (including other emoluments and allowances)
Telangana	₹400,000 (US$4,200) (Including Salary received as MLC/MLA)
Delhi	₹390,000 (US$4,100) (Including Salary received as MLA)
Uttar Pradesh	₹365,000 (US$3,800) (Including Salary received as MLC/MLA)
Maharashtra	₹340,000 (US$3,500) (Including Salary received as MLC/MLA)
Andhra Pradesh	₹335,000 (US$3,500) (Including Salary received as MLC/MLA)
Gujarat	₹321,000 (US$3,300) (Including Salary received as MLA)
Himachal Pradesh	₹310,000 (US$3,200) (Including Salary received as MLA)
Haryana	₹288,000 (US$3,000) (Including Salary received as MLA)
Jharkhand	₹272,000 (US$2,800) (Including Salary received as MLA)
Madhya Pradesh	₹255,000 (US$2,700) (Including Salary received as MLA)
Chhattisgarh	₹230,000 (US$2,400) (Including Salary received as MLA)
Punjab	₹230,000 (US$2,400) (Including Salary received as MLA)
Goa	₹220,000 (US$2,300) (Including Salary received as MLA)
Bihar	₹215,000 (US$2,200) (Including Salary received as MLC/MLA)
West Bengal	₹210,000 (US$2,200) (Including Salary received as MLA)
Tamil Nadu	₹285,000 (US$3,000) (Including Salary received as MLA)
Karnataka	₹200,000 (US$2,100) (Including Salary received as MLC/MLA)
Sikkim	₹190,000 (US$2,000) (Including Salary received as MLA)
Kerala	₹185,000 (US$1,900) (Including Salary received as MLA)
Rajasthan	₹300,000 (US$3,100) (Including Salary received as MLA)
Uttarakhand	₹175,000 (US$1,800) (Including Salary received as MLA)
Assam	₹160,000 (US$1,700) (Including Salary received as MLA)
Odisha	₹160,000 (US$1,700)(Including Salary received as MLA)
Meghalaya	₹150,000 (US$1,600) (Including Salary received as MLA)
Arunachal Pradesh	₹133,000 (US$1,400) (Including Salary received as MLA)
Manipur	₹120,000 (US$1,300) (Including Salary received as MLA)
Mizoram (Note: passed by Assembly Session on 21 November 2019)	₹120,000 (US$1,300) (Including Salary received as MLA)
Puducherry	₹120,000 (US$1,300) (Including Salary received as MLA)
Nagaland	₹110,000 (US$1,100) (Including Salary received as MLA)
Tripura	₹105,000 (US$1,100) (Including Salary received as MLA)

== Salaries of MLCs & MLAs ==
The net salary of the Members of the Legislative Council/Members kd the Legislative Assembly varies from state to state. The following table shows the basic pay of MLA/MLC in each state of India.

== Salaries and allowances to the Member of Parliaments ==
In April 2024, the salaries, allowances, pensions, etc. of the Member of Parliament (i.e. Rajya Sabha and Lok Sabha) were revised and retrospectively implemented from April 1, 2023. According to the revised structure, the salary of the MPs increased by 24%, that is an increase from ₹100,000 (US$1,000) to ₹124,000 (US$1,300). Additionally, They are granted ₹87,000 (US$910) per month as a Constituency Allowance and ₹75,000 (US$780) per month as an office allowance (of which ₹25,000 for Office expenses and ₹50,000 for secretarial assistance).

In terms of privileges, MPs and their families are entitled to free medical care. They can avail themselves of 34 domestic flights annually and enjoy unlimited first-class train travel for both official and personal use. They are also provided with rent-free accommodation in prime locations of New Delhi. Their communication expenses are covered through telephone benefits amounting to ₹1.5 lakh per year. For utilities, they are allocated 50,000 units of free electricity and 4 lakh litres of free water annually.

The daily allowance has also been revised to ₹2,500 per day, while the pension has been increased from ₹25,000 to ₹31,000 per month. The additional pension for each year of service beyond five years has also been raised from ₹2,000 to ₹2,500 per month.

== See also ==
- List of office-holders in India
- Order of precedence in India
