= Public account =

Public account may refer to:

- Public Account (India)
- Public Account, 1975 BBC TV programme in Scotland
- Public accounting
- WeChat#Public accounts
- Account sharing
