= Anil Kumar Chanda =

Indian politician (1906–1976)

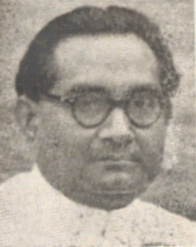

2nd Comptroller and Auditor General of India
- In office 1954–1960
- President: Rajendra Prasad
- Preceded by: V. Narahari Rao
- Succeeded by: A. K. Roy

Member of Parliament, Lok Sabha
- In office 1967-1971
- Succeeded by: Saradish Roy
- Constituency: Bolpur, West Bengal
- In office 1952-1962
- Succeeded by: Sisir Kumar Das
- Constituency: Birbhum, West Bengal

Personal details
- Born: 23 May 1906 Silchar, Assam, British India
- Died: 21 April 1976 (aged 69) {Infobox officeholder
- Party: Indian National Congress
- Spouse: Rani Chanda
- Children: Abhijit Chanda

Anil Kumar Chanda (23 May 1906 - 21 April 1976) was elected to the Lok Sabha, the lower house of the Parliament of India as a member of the Indian National Congress. He was the Deputy Minister of External Affairs and later Deputy Minister, Works, Housing and Supply Ministry in the Nehru Ministry. He studied at the London School of Economics and Political Science and worked as chief secretary to Rabindranath Tagore in Shantiniketan. He and his wife author Rani Chanda (1912-1997) were the closest associates of Rabindranath Tagore during the last decade of his life. Rani Chanda gifted a few beautiful memoirs of that period to the Bengali readers. They had one son, Abhijit Chanda. They eventually settled in Shantiniketan.
