= V. Narahari Rao =

Indian civil servant

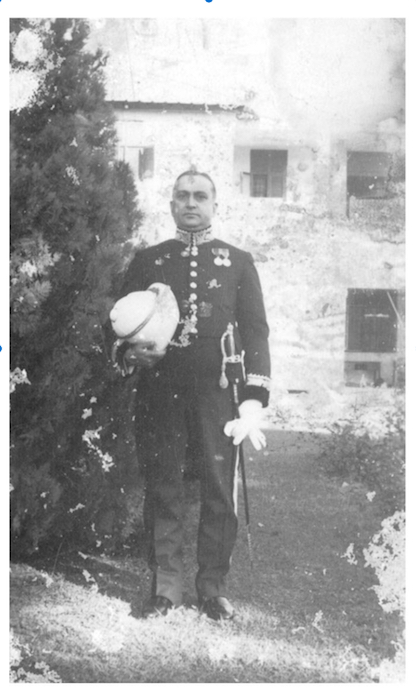
- Narahari Rao in his civil service uniform

1st Comptroller and Auditor General of India
- In office 1950–1954
- President: Rajendra Prasad
- Preceded by: Office Established
- Succeeded by: Anil Kumar Chanda

Personal details
- Born: Indian
- Occupation: Civil servant
- Awards: Padma Bhushan

Vyakarana Narahari Rao was an Indian civil servant who served the Indian Audit and Accounts Service in the post-independence India. He served as the first Comptroller and Auditor General of India from 1948 to 1954. The Government of India awarded him the third highest civilian honour of the Padma Bhushan, in 1954, for his contributions to civil service.

== See also ==
- Comptroller and Auditor General of India
