= Vinod Rai =

11th Comptroller and Auditor General of India

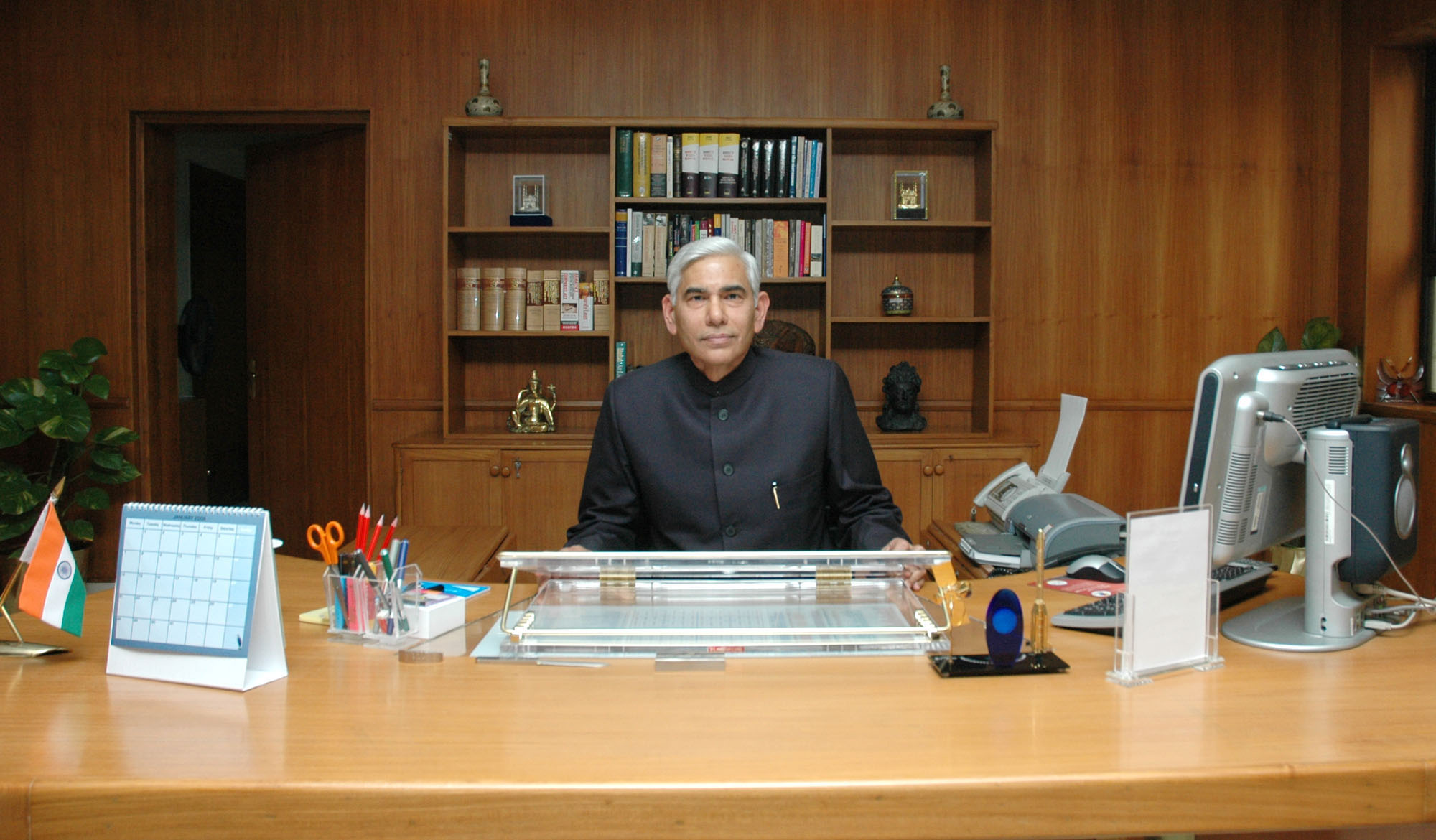

Chairman of Banks Board Bureau
- In office 30 January 2017 – 31 March 2018
- Preceded by: Position Established
- Succeeded by: Bhanu Pratap Sharma

11th Comptroller and Auditor General of India
- In office 7 January 2008 – 22 May 2013
- Preceded by: VN Kaul
- Succeeded by: Shashi Kant Sharma

Personal details
- Born: 23 May 1948 (age 78) Ghazipur, United Provinces, India
- Education: Economics (B.A, M.A); Masters in Public Administration
- Alma mater: University of Delhi; Harvard University
- Known for: Audits on 2G spectrum allocation, coal allocation

Vinod Rai (born 23 May 1948) is a retired IAS officer who served as the 11th Comptroller and Auditor General of India. He assumed office on 7 January 2008 till 22 May 2013. He is the current chairman of UN Panel of External Auditors and Honorary Advisor to the Indian Railways and a member of the Railway Kaya Kalp Council.

The most prominent action of CAG under Vinod Rai was the report that stated that the 2G sprectrum allocation by the government had caused a loss of over ₹1 lakh crore (equivalent to ₹3.0 trillion or US$31 billion in 2023) to the government. Rai was made the chairman of the Banking Board of India under the new government. On 30 January 2017, the Supreme Court of India appointed Rai as the interim president of the Board of Control for Cricket in India (BCCI).

== Early life and education ==
He was born in a Bhumihar family at Ghazipur, Uttar Pradesh. He did his schooling from Birla Public School in Pilani, Rajasthan. He graduated from Hindu College, University of Delhi. He has a bachelor's and master's degree in economics from Delhi School of Economics, University of Delhi and MPA from Harvard University, USA in 1988. He chose to study Financial Administration at Harvard Kennedy school in 1987 while he held the position of District Collector and Magistrate in the state of Kerala, India.

He is married and has three children.

== Career ==
Rai is a 1972 batch Kerala cadre officer of Indian Administrative Service (IAS). He started his career as the sub-collector of Thrissur District. Later, he became the Collector and spent his eight years of career in Thrissur City. He was called the second Sakthan Thampuran for his role in the development of the Thrissur City. He was the MD of Kerala State Co-operative Marketing Federation from 1977 to 1980. Later he was appointed as Principal Secretary (Finance) in the State Government of Kerala. He had served senior positions in the Ministries of Commerce and Defence, Government of India. Prior to his appointment as CAG, he served as Secretary, Financial Services and Additional Secretary in the Banking Division including banks and insurance companies under Ministry of Finance.

Rai was instrumental in setting up the India Infrastructure Finance Company and was also on the Board of this company. Apart from serving in both, state and union governments, he has been a director on several Boards, including the State Bank of India, ICICI Bank, IDBI Bank, Life Insurance Corporation of India and Infrastructure Development and Finance Company of India.

In February 2016, Rai was appointed the chairman of Banks Board Bureau (BBB), the body which advises the government on top-level appointments at public sector banks and ways to address the bad loans.

== United Nations Panel of External Auditors ==
He is the chairman of United Nations Panel of External Auditors and member of the Governing Board of the International Organization of Supreme Audit Institutions (INTOSAI). The United Nations Secretary-General Ban Ki-moon has appreciated the panel and the yeoman service rendered by the external auditors in improving governance in the United Nations system. The panel headed by Vinod Rai discussed the major business transformations currently under way in the United Nations with Secretary-General Ban Ki-moon. The Panel of External Auditors plays an important role in promoting accountability and strengthening governance mechanisms in the UN organisations. Mr. Rai has taken over as the chairman of Governing Board of the Asian Organization of Supreme Audit Institutions (ASOSAI) on 29 February 2012.

== BCCI chief ==
- The Supreme Court nominated a four-member panel to look after the administration of the BCCI.
- Former CAG Vinod Rai, historian Ramachandra Guha, banker Vikaram Limaye and former captain of women's cricket team Diana Edulji were to look after the BCCI's administration until formal elections were held.

== Reforms suggested by Vinod Rai ==
Vinod Rai recommended that all private-public partnerships (PPPs), "Panchayti Raj Institutions" and societies benefiting from government funds should come within the ambit of the CAG. The PPP model is a popular medium for the execution of infrastructure projects worth millions of rupees, and these projects are not audited by the CAG. 60 percent of government spending does not currently come under the scrutiny of the CAG.

== Major audits ==
=== 2G Spectrum allocation ===
He is widely credited for the report on issue of Licences and Allocation of 2G Spectrum by United Progressive Alliance government which resulted in a huge controversy in India. The report estimated that there was a presumptive loss of ₹1,766.45 billion (US$18 billion). In a chargesheet filed on 2 April 2011 by the investigating agency Central Bureau of Investigation (CBI), the agency pegged the loss at ₹309,845.5 million (US$3.2 billion)

On 2 February 2012 the Supreme Court of India on a public interest litigation (PIL) declared allotment of spectrum as "unconstitutional and arbitrary" and quashed all the 122 licenses issued in 2008 during tenure of A. Raja (then minister for communications & IT in United Progressive Alliance) the main accused. The court further said that A. Raja "wanted to favour some companies at the cost of the public exchequer" and "virtually gifted away important national asset". In 2014, Rai named Sanjay Nirupam as one of the MPs who pressured him to leave former prime minister Dr. Manmohan Singh out of the report. Nirupam filed a defamation case against Rai in the Metropolitan Court in New Delhi’s Patiala house. In October 2021, he tendered unconditional apology to Mr. Sanjay Nirupam for the false accusations. In a written affidavit Rai said: “That I have realised that in answer to questions posed to me by the interviewers, I had inadvertently and wrongly mentioned the name of Sanjay Nirupam as one of the MPs who pressurised me to keep the then Prime Minister Manmohan Singh’s name out of the CAG report on 2G spectrum allocation during the meetings in the PAC or the sidelines of JPC.”

=== Padmanabhaswamy Temple Audit ===
Based on the recommendations by amicus curiae-senior advocate Gopal Subramaniam who was investigating the issues of financial irregularities and mismanagement in the Padmanabhaswamy Temple, the Supreme Court of India issued an interim order on 24 April 2014 stating that Mr Vinod Rai will supervise special audit of property of temple. Rai responded by saying that he felt "very humbled" and said "With all sincerity I will take up the task".

== Confrontation with Governments ==
As a part of his duty, Rai has many a times raised questions on faulty policy making of several state governments and Union government run by Congress led United Progressive Alliance and BJP led Governments in Chhattisgarh and Gujarat. CAG criticised the government of Goa for forest policy delay.

There are certain times when ministers of ruling Congress coalition government criticised CAG. Minister of state in PMO, V. Narayanasamy said "CAG has no authority or right to comment on the policy of the government but unfortunately it has questioned its authority, which is totally unwarranted and against the mandate given to them". However CAG Vinod Rai defended his position by stating at an Economic Editor's Conference in 2011 "I am making it clear that I do not think the CAG is exceeding its jurisdiction, because the basic responsibility of the CAG is to identify if there is any lapse," and challenged the government to identify the specific breach of mandate.

== Personal life ==
It is noted with irony that while studying at Delhi School of Economics Vinod Rai was the student of Manmohan Singh who was serving as the professor during those days in DSE. Because years later the same student Vinod Rai turned out to be one of the reasons to not only exposed the corruption but led the downfall of his professor Manmohan Singh government.

== Controversies ==
=== 2G scam falsehood ===
On 21 December 2017, a Special CBI Court acquitted all the persons accused in the 2G scam, a case set in motion by Vinod Rai. The Special Judge OP Saini stated in his judgement: "There is no evidence on the record produced before the Court indicating any criminality in the acts allegedly committed by the accused persons.” He added that “the chargesheet of the instant case is based mainly on misreading, selective reading, non-reading and out of context reading of the official record” and that "the chargesheet is based on some oral statements made by the witnesses during investigation, which the witnesses have not owned up in the witness box.”

=== Indian National Congress Allegations ===
In October 2021, after Vinod Rai unconditionally apologized to Sanjay Nirupam, the Indian National Congress's leader Adhir Ranjan Chaudhary said, "Vinod Rai the former CAG has proved himself as a stooge of BJP, who was entrusted upon playing a sinister design to tarnish the image of UPA Government by his quixotic, wilful and deliberate observations in the CAG paras. He should be punished for his dereliction of duties". Then Congress's Chief Minister Ashok Gehlot accused, "Vinod Rai's false claims on 2G spectrum, Coal scam led to UPA's defeat". Congress's Pawan Khera accused that, "Imagine a man who can lie to sell a book, what all can he do to push his own agenda and the agenda of his masters."

== Published book ==
He wrote Not Just an Accountant: The Diary of the Nations Conscience Keeper, which speaks about how the political system was exploited to violate laws in 2G spectrum case, Krishna-Godavari gas basin contract, Commonwealth Games scam, Indian coal allocation scam and the controversial purchase of aircraft.

== Awards and recognition ==
Year	Name	Awarding organisation	Ref.
2012	Alumnus of the Decade	Old Students Association, Hindu College, University of Delhi	
2013	Civil Servant achieving Excellence in Public Administration	Mannapuram Finance Limited	
2013	Outstanding contribution to the Indian economy	CNBC TV18	
2016	Padma Bhushan (Civil Service)	Government of India	

He figured as one of the Persons of the Year in Forbes magazine in January 2011.

In December 2011, he was chosen as the chief of UN external audit panel.

In February 2012, CAG was complimented for professionalism, training and infrastructure by its US counterpart.
