= R. Balaji Rao =

R. Balaji Rao (1842–1896) was an Indian politician and Indian independence activist who was a founder and first Secretary of the Madras Mahajana Sabha.

== Personal life ==
Balaji Rao was born in a Thanjavur Marathi Deshastha Brahmin family in the year 1842. He had his schooling and higher education in Tanjore and Madras and graduated in law. On completion of his studies, Balaji Rao practised as a lawyer before entering the Indian independence movement.

== Politics ==
Balaji entered politics and was one of the founding members of the Madras Mahajana Sabha. He represented Tanjore at the first session of the Indian National Congress along with S. A. Swaminatha Iyer. Balaji Rao established the Chingleput Ryots Relief Fund for the benefit of the ryots of Chingleput district.

== Death ==
Balaji Rao died in 1896.
