= K Sanjay Murthy =

15th Comptroller and Auditor General of India

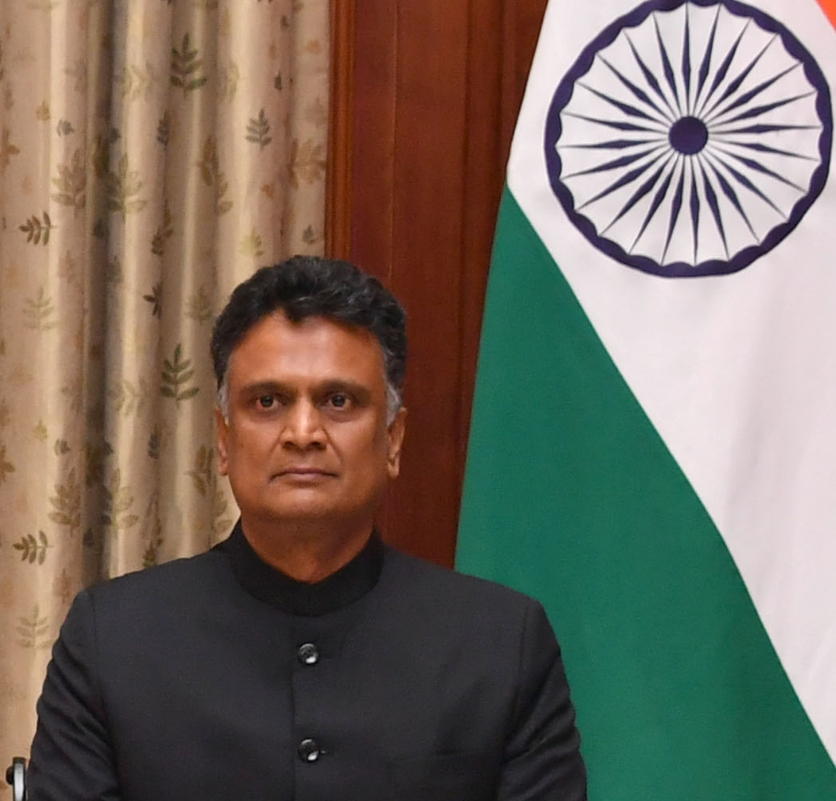

15th Comptroller and Auditor General of India
- Incumbent
- Assumed office 21 November 2024
- President: Draupadi Murmu
- Preceded by: Girish Chandra Murmu

Higher Education Secretary of India
- In office October 2021 – November 2024
- Preceded by: Amit Khare
- Succeeded by: Vineet Joshi

CEO of National Industrial Corridor Development Corporation
- In office 18 November 2019 – 1 October 2021
- Appointed by: Appointments Committee of the Cabinet

Personal details
- Born: Kondru Sanjay Murthy; 20 December 1964 (age 61) Andhra Pradesh, India
- Education: IIT Kharagpur
- Occupation: retired IAS officer

Kondru Sanjay Murthy (born 24 December 1964) is a retired 1989 batch IAS officer from the Himachal Pradesh cadre who is currently serving as the Comptroller and Auditor General of India since November 2024.

== Early life and education ==
Kondru Sanjay Murthy was born on 24 December 1964 in Andhra Pradesh in India. He is the son of former Amalapuram MP and retired IAS officer KSR Murthy. Murthy has completed his education in mechanical engineering from IIT Kharagpur.

== Civil Service career ==
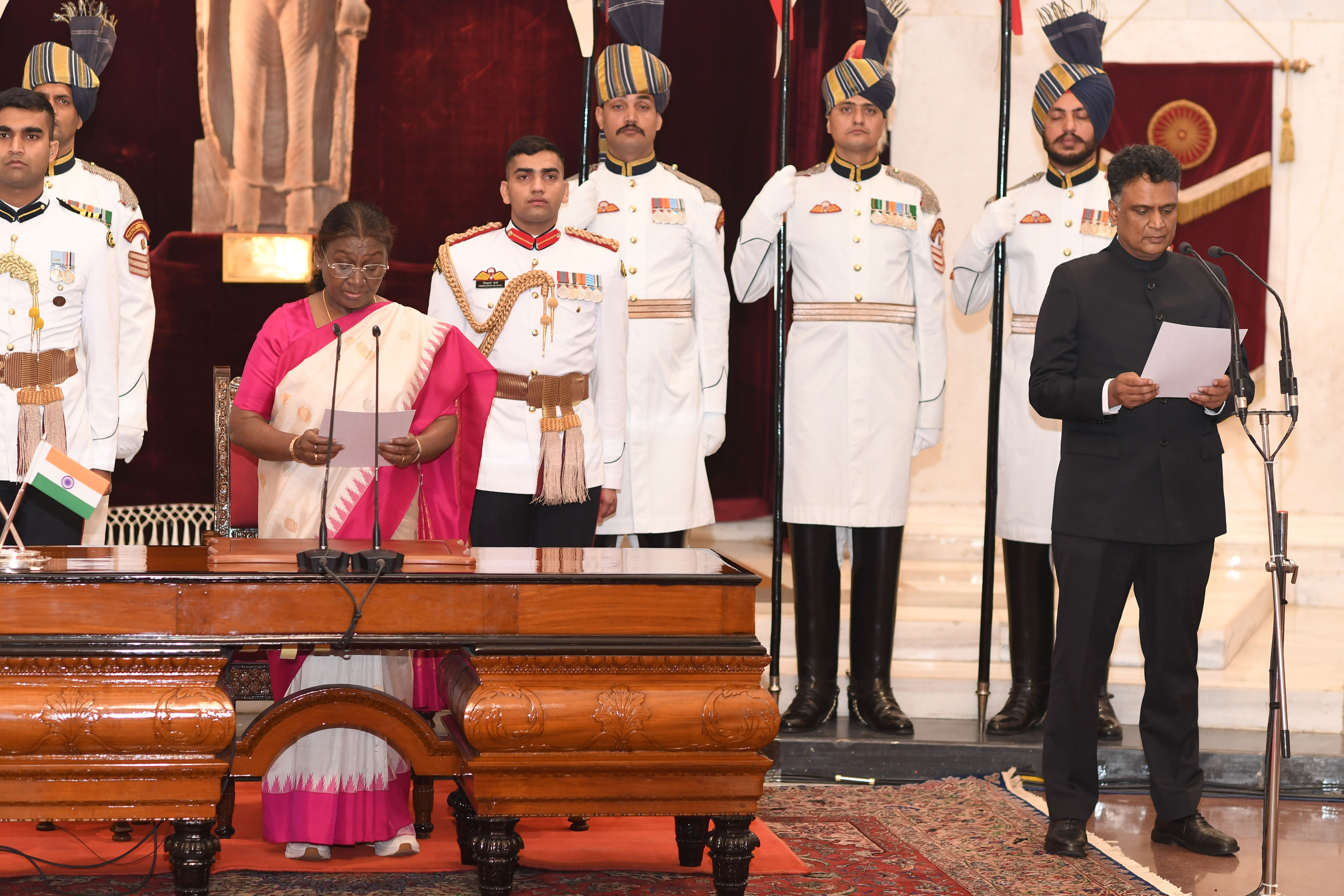
President Droupadi Murmu administering the oath of office to K Sanjay Murthy as the 15th Comptroller and Auditor General of India on 21 November 2024.

Murthy is a retired Indian Administrative Service officer of 1989 batch from Himachal Pradesh cadre.

In his state cadre in the Government of Himachal Pradesh. Murthy served in various capacities in the state for 13 years before going on a Central deputation between 2002-2007 during this period he held secretarial positions in Ministry of Environment and Forest and in Ministry of Communication and Information Technology. He was also associated with National Institute for Smart Government in Hyderabad assisting various state governments. After returning he served in important roles in Departments of Primary, Higher and Technical education of the Government of Himachal Pradesh and also as the managing director of Himachal Pradesh Power Corporation.

He also served as the Principal Secretary in the Ministry of Transport, Housing and Urban Development of Himachal Pradesh State Government for a period of one year.

In Central Government he had served in as the Secretary of Department of Higher Education in the Ministry of Education from October 2021 to November 2024 where his tenure saw the implementation of National Education Policy 2020.

Before that he served as the Additional Secretary in the Ministry of Housing and Urban Affairs and as the Joint Secretary in Ministry of Information and Broadcasting.

He has also served as the chief executive officer of National Industrial Corridor Development Corporation.

On 21 November 2024, Murthy was appointed as the 15th Comptroller and Auditor General of India succeeding Girish Chandra Murmu.
