= G. C. Murmu =

14th Comptroller and Auditor General of India

Girish Chandra Murmu IAS (Retd.)
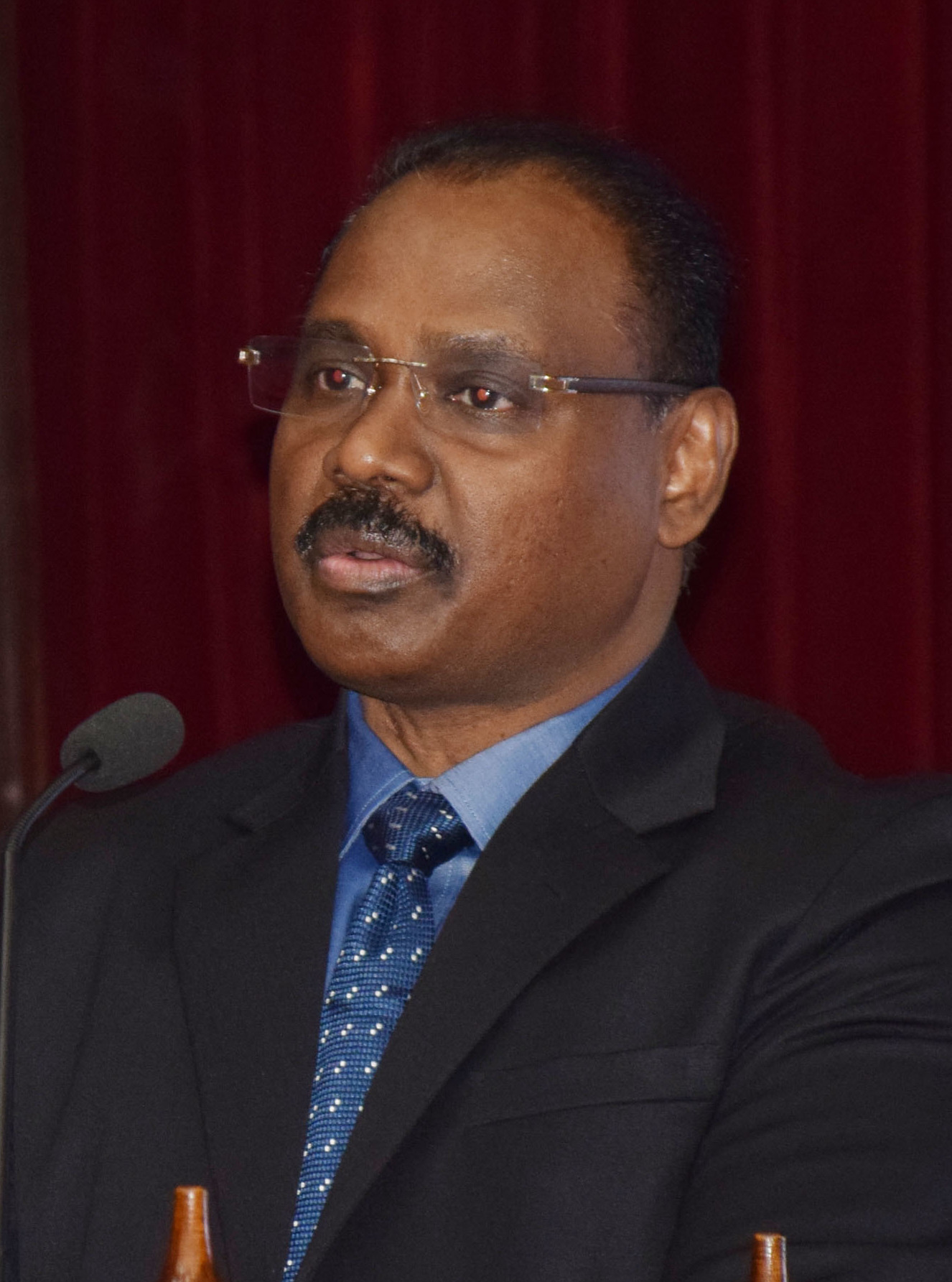

14th Comptroller and Auditor General of India
- In office 8 August 2020 – 20 November 2024
- President: Ram Nath Kovind; Draupadi Murmu
- Preceded by: Rajiv Mehrishi
- Succeeded by: K Sanjay Murthy

Chairman of the United Nations Panel of External Auditors
- In office 8 August 2020 – 20 November 2024
- Preceded by: Rajiv Mehrishi
- Succeeded by: K Sanjay Murthy

1st Lieutenant Governor of Jammu and Kashmir
- In office 31 October 2019 – 6 August 2020
- Chief Minister: Vacant
- Preceded by: Position established Satyapal Malik (as Governor)
- Succeeded by: Manoj Sinha

Expenditure Secretary of India
- In office 1 March 2019 – 30 October 2019
- President: Ramnath Kovind
- Preceded by: Ajay Narayan Jha
- Succeeded by: Atanu Chakraborty

Personal details
- Born: Girish Chandra Murmu; 21 November 1959 (age 66) Betnoti, Odisha, India
- Spouse: Smita Shukla Murmu
- Children: 2
- Education: Utkal University (BA); University of Birmingham (MBA)
- Occupation: IAS officer

Girish Chandra Murmu (born 21 November 1959) is a retired Indian Administrative Service officer of Gujarat cadre who has served as 14th Comptroller and Auditor General of India from 2020 to 2024 and as the external auditor of the Inter-Parliamentary Union. He served as chairman of the United Nations Panel of External Auditors and the Asian Organization of Supreme Audit Institutions. He is currently the external auditor of the WHO (2020-2023), succeeding the Auditor General of the Philippines. He was the Inaugural Lieutenant Governor of the Union Territory of Jammu and Kashmir till 6 August 2020. He is a 1985 batch IAS officer of Gujarat cadre and was principal secretary to Narendra Modi during his tenure as the Chief Minister of Gujarat.

== Early life and education ==
G.C. Murmu was born on 21 November 1959 in Betnoti village of Mayurbhanj district in Odisha in a Santal family. He holds a Master of Arts degree in Political Science from Utkal University. He also holds an MBA degree from University of Birmingham. He is the eldest among eight siblings, six brothers and two sisters. One of his brothers, Shirish Chandra Murmu is working as a Deputy Governor at the Reserve Bank of India as of 2025.

== Career ==
In 2001, when Narendra Modi became chief minister of Gujarat, Murmu was the Relief Commissioner. Shortly afterwards he became Commissioner, Mines and Minerals and thereafter Managing Director, Gujarat Maritime Board.

Murmu's career took off in 2004 when he was made joint secretary of the Gujarat Home Department, which was headed by Amit Shah and directly supervised by Narendra Modi. He was given the task of handling the 2002 Gujarat riots cases.

Murmu has been described as "trusted aide" of Narendra Modi and Amit Shah since his bureaucratic assignments in Gujarat by many news outlets such as The Hindu, The Wire, Hindustan Times and News18 India. When Modi became prime minister, he called Murmu to New Delhi to finance ministry's expenditure department, where he served as joint secretary.

Murmu was questioned by Central Bureau of Investigation in 2013 in an alleged staged encounter case involving the killing of Ishrat Jahan and three others who allegedly plotted to assassinate the then Chief Minister of Gujarat, Narendra Modi. The Tehelka magazine presented an audio recording where Murmu, along with senior law officer Kamal Trivedi and the then-junior home minister at the Centre, Praful Patel, were purportedly heard discussing methods to conceal the alleged fake encounter. These audio recordings are recorded in CBI's chargesheet in the mentioned case.

On 31 October 2019, Murmu took charge as the first Lieutenant Governor of Jammu and Kashmir after the formation of the new Union territory of Jammu and Kashmir under the Jammu and Kashmir Reorganisation Act, 2019. He succeeded Governor of Jammu and Kashmir Satya Pal Malik, to become the first Lieutenant Governor of Jammu and Kashmir. Chief Justice of Jammu and Kashmir High Court Gita Mittal administered the oath of office at a function at Raj Bhavan. On 5 August 2020, he resigned from his position.

On 8 August 2020, he was appointed as the Comptroller and Auditor General of India and served in office till 20 November 2024.

== See also ==
- R. K. Mathur

Political offices
Preceded by Satya Pal Malik; As Governor of Jammu and Kashmir	Lieutenant Governor of Jammu and Kashmir; 31 October 2019 - 6 August 2020	Succeeded by Manoj Sinha
