= P. J. Thomas (civil servant) =

Indian civil administrator

14th Central Vigilance Commissioner
- In office 7 September 2010 – 4 March 2011
- Preceded by: Pratyush Sinha
- Succeeded by: Pradeep Kumar

Personal details
- Born: 13 January 1951 (age 75)

Polayil Joseph Thomas (born 13 January 1951) is a 1973 batch Indian Administrative Service officer from Kerala cadre. He was appointed as the 14th Chief Vigilance Commissioner of India, in an appointment that came under Supreme Court's review and later to be annulled by court as "non-est" in law. The appointment and the subsequent quashing led to several public debates with regard to the eligibility criteria for CVC's appointment, judicial activism, as well as the role played by mainstream media to hide several key facts that could establish his otherwise unblemished record in the civil services.

== Early life and career ==
Thomas hails from a middle-class family from Alappuzha district. A brilliant student right from his school days, Thomas is a post-graduate in Physics and later took his Masters in Economics. Thomas joined the Indian Administrative Service as one of the toppers in the Civil Services Examination in the year 1973. His elder brother, Johny Joseph, is also an IAS officer. As an IAS officer, Thomas has held important assignments in Kerala as the Chief Electoral Officer of the state, and as Secretary in Finance, Industry, Agriculture, Law and Justice and Human Resource Development Departments. As the chief electoral officer, Thomas was instrumental in introducing electronic voting machine in all stages of election. He was the founder director of the Indian Institute of Management, Kozhikode. He became the Kerala Chief Secretary in 2007 and moved to the central government as Secretary in the Ministry of Parliamentary Affairs in January 2009. Later he went on to become the Telecom Secretary.

The 3G Spectrum auction happened when Thomas was the Telecom Secretary and helped the government earn a revenue two times than what analysts predicted. The 3G and broadband spectrums jointly fetched 1060 billion Indian rupees for the government against its estimates of 350 billion. The success of 3G Spectrum was a big boost to the government, when it was bearing the brunt from 2G spectrum case, the auction for which happened before Thomas assumed the office of Telecom Secretary. While in Telecom, Thomas opposition to Devas deal was decisive for the government. Thomas had stressed that the spectrum planned by the Department of Space is crucial to meeting the strategic requirements of nation and hence it should not be frittered away by giving it to private parties and that too not without following the process of auction to maximise the government revenue. In September 2010, Mr. Thomas succeeded Pratyush Sinha, a 1969-batch IAS officer of Bihar cadre, as the CVC.

== Allegations ==
=== Palmolein Oil Import Scam ===
The alleged scam of palmolein oil import happened in 1992, when K.Karunakaran was the Chief Minister of Kerala. In 1991, the state government had decided to import palm oil from Power and Energy Limited, a company based in Singapore. The price fixed for the import was 405 USD per tonne. The oil was imported in 1992, but the opposition, LDF, raised a stink in the deal, alleging a loss of more than 20 million to the exchequer, by comparing the import price with the international price of palm oil which was at 392.25 USD per tonne. The role of Thomas, who was then the Secretary of Food and Civil Supplies, was to translate a cabinet decision into a government order and communicating the order to the Kerala State Civil Supplies Corporation.

In 1996, the LDF government came to power, and resurrected the matter by causing an FIR to be filed against Karunakaran and six others under various sections of the Prevention of Corruption Act. Thomas was not named in the FIR, as he was not involved in the decision making or the fixing of price. Almost a year later, on 8 February 1998, Thomas' name was added to the FIR as accused no. 8. The state government then approached the Government of India in November 1999 for sanction to prosecute Thomas for offences under the Prevention of Corruption Act alleged against him. The Chief Vigilance Commissioner, however, did not grant the sanction, as the material on record did not disclose any criminal offence by Thomas. The trial court was unable to proceed with the trial of the case for the lack of sanction for the prosecution of Karunakaran, who was then a member of parliament, and other government servants. Following this, the state government filed an appeal to High Court, and High Court allowed the trial without the mandatory sanction for the prosecution of the accused. However, Karunakaran challenged the High Court's decision in Supreme Court, and in 2003, the Supreme Court of India upheld stay in the proceedings of the case. The case was then pending with the Supreme Court for more than a decade until the stay was lifted after Karunakaran's death in 2010. The long stay in this case eventually became detrimental to Thomas, as his appointment to the post of CVC was mired with controversies on whether the pending charge-sheet was discussed by the High Powered Committee. However, a section of the media observed that Thomas is not guilty of any wrongdoing, because the LDF government in 2006 would not have otherwise appointed him to the highest post in the state civil service, Chief Secretary to the Government of Kerala.

== Appointment as Chief Vigilance Commissioner ==
P.J. Thomas was appointed as the Chief Vigilance Commissioner in September 2010, by the President of India, on the recommendation of a High Powered Committee (HPC) headed by the Prime Minister of India. The selection of the new CVC was marked by controversies, after Sushma Swaraj, who was part of three-member selection committee, objected to the choice of Thomas, citing the pending charge-sheet in his name. A public interest litigation was filed by the Centre for Public Interest Litigation, and the HPC recommendation came under Supreme Court's review.

On 3 March 2011, the Supreme Court quashed the appointment of Thomas as the Chief Vigilance Commissioner, noting that the HPC did not consider the relevant materials on the pending charge-sheet. Though Thomas resigned after the Court's observation, he asked the President of India to seek a review petition against the court's judgement on various grounds, including the constitutionality of the judgment. The basis for the request for the review petition, according to Thomas's lawyer, Wills Mathews, was that the three judges' judgement on the CVC is not legally valid because Article 145 (3) says that the minimum number of judges required for interpretation of Constitution is five, which in effect makes the Supreme Court judgement null and void. Mathews also questioned whether the court had exercised jurisdiction on an issue in which it was not having the jurisdiction. He claimed that the Supreme Court has the power to initiate the proceeding for the removal of the CVC, only on a reference made by the President, and as such there was no reference of the President of India in the present matter. Thomas submitted that quashing the appointment resulted in miscarriage of justice not only for Thomas but to all civil servants of the country 'because the mere lodging of an FIR is sufficient to stop an honest officer from taking charge of the coveted post and shall spoil his career prospects'. The President of India however refused to consider Thomas's request for the review petition and Pradeep Kumar was appointed as the new CVC.
