= Central Vigilance Commission =

Apex Indian governmental body created in 1964 to address governmental corruption

Central Vigilance Commission of India
- केंद्रीय सतर्कता आयोग
- Emblem
- Incumbent; A.S. Rajeev since 3 August 2026
- Type: Independent Autonomous body
- Status: Active
- Abbreviation: CVC
- Reports to: Government of India; Parliament of India
- Residence: A-Block, GPO Complex, Satarkata Bhavan, INA, New Delhi, Delhi 110023
- Seat: New Delhi, Delhi
- Nominator: Prime Minister (Chairperson); Home Minister (Member); Leader of the Opposition in Lok Sabha
- Appointer: President of India
- Term length: Up to 4 years or 65 years
- Constituting instrument: K.Santhanam Committee
- Inaugural holder: Nittoor Srinivasa Rau
- Website: cvc.gov.in

Central Vigilance Commission (CVC) is an Indian governmental body created in 1964 to address governmental corruption. In 2003, the Parliament enacted a law conferring statutory status on the CVC. It has the status of an autonomous body, free of control from any executive authority, charged with monitoring all vigilance activity under the Central Government of India, advising various authorities in central Government organizations in planning, executing, reviewing, and reforming their vigilance work.

== History ==
It was set up by the Government of India Resolution on 11 February 1964, on the recommendations of the Committee on Prevention of Corruption, headed by K. Santhanam, to advise and guide Central Government agencies in the field of vigilance. Nittoor Srinivasa Rau was selected as the first Chief Vigilance Commissioner of India.

The Annual Report of the CVC not only gives the details of the work done by it but also brings out the system failures which leads to corruption in various Departments/Organisations, system improvements, various preventive measures and cases in which the commission's advises were ignored. Praveen Kumar Srivastava was sworn in by President, as the Central Vigilance Commissioner, he is a 1988 batch IAS officer of Assam-Meghalaya cadre and also served earlier as Vigilance Commissioner.

== Role ==
The CVC is not an investigating agency: the only investigation carried out by the CVC is that of examining Civil Works of the Government.

Corruption investigations against government officials can proceed only after the government permits order. The CVC publishes a list of cases where permissions are pending, some of which may be more than a year old.

The Ordinance of 1998 conferred statutory status to the CVC and the powers to exercise superintendence over the functioning of the Delhi Special Police Establishment, and also to review the progress of the investigations on alleged offences under the Prevention of Corruption Act, 1988 conducted by them. In 1998 the Government introduced the CVC Bill in the Lok Sabha to replace the Ordinance, though it was not successful. The Bill was re-introduced in 1999 and remained with the Parliament until September 2003, when it became an Act after being duly passed in both the Houses of Parliament. The CVC has also been publishing a list of corrupt government officials against which it has recommended punitive action. In 2004, the Union government authorised the CVC as the "Designated Agency" to receive written complaints for disclosure on any allegation of corruption or misuse of office and recommend appropriate action. This report delivers to the president.

== Appointment ==
The Central Vigilance Commissioner and the Vigilance Commissioners are appointed by the President on recommendation of a Committee consisting of the Prime Minister (Chairperson), the Minister of Home Affairs (Member) and the Leader of the Opposition in the Lok Sabha.

== Removal ==
A member of the commission can be removed from his office only by order of the President on the ground of proved misbehaviour or incapacity after the Supreme Court, on a reference made to it by the President, has, on inquiry, reported that the Central Vigilance Commissioner or any Vigilance Commissioner, as the case may be, ought to be removed. The President may suspend from office, and if deemed necessary, prohibit also from attending the office during inquiry, the Central Vigilance Commissioner or any Vigilance Commissioner in respect of whom a reference has been made to the Supreme Court until the President has passed orders on receipt of the report of the Supreme Court on such reference. The President may, by order, remove from office the Central Vigilance Commissioner or any Vigilance Commissioner if the Central Vigilance Commissioner or such Vigilance Commissioner, as the case may be:

- is adjudged an insolvent; or
- has been convicted of an offence which, in the opinion of the Central Government, involves moral turpitude; or
- engages during his term of office in any paid employment outside the duties of his office; or
- is, in the opinion of the President, unfit to continue in office by reason of infirmity of mind or body; or
- has acquired such financial or other interest as is likely to affect prejudicially his functions as a Central Vigilance Commissioner or a Vigilance Commissioner.

== Organisation ==
Current Composition
Designation	Person
Central Vigilance Commissioner	A.S Rajeev
Vigilance Commissioner	Praveen Vashista
Vigilance Commissioner	Vacant

The Central Vigilance Commission has its own Secretariat, Chief Technical Examiners' Wing (CTE) and a wing of Commissioners for Departmental Inquiries (CDI). As of 21 March 2012, CVC has a staff strength of 257 against sanctioned strength of 299 (including the post of CVC and 2 VCs).

=== Secretariat ===
The Secretariat consists of a Secretary of the rank of Additional Secretary to the Union government, one officer of the rank of Joint Secretary to the Union government, ten officers of the rank of Director/Deputy Secretary, four Under Secretaries and office staff.

=== Chief Technical Examiners' Wing (CTE) ===
The Chief Technical Examiners' Organisation constitutes the technical wing of the Central Vigilance Commission and has two Engineers of the rank of Chief Engineers (designated as Chief Technical Examiners) with supporting engineering staff. Following are the main functions of this organisation:

- Technical audit of construction works of Governmental organisations from a vigilance angle
- Investigating specific cases of complaints relating to construction works
- Assisting the CBI in their investigations involving technical matters and for evaluation of properties in Delhi
- Assisting the Commission and Chief Vigilance Officers in vigilance cases involving technical matters.

=== Commissioners for Departmental Inquiries (CDI) ===
There are fourteen posts of Commissioners for Departmental Inquiries (CDI) in the commission, 11 in the rank of Director and 03 in the rank of Deputy Secretary. The CDIs function as Inquiry Officers to conduct inquiries in departmental proceedings initiated against public servants.

=== The Directorate General of Vigilance ===
The Directorate General of Vigilance, Income Tax is the apex body under the Central Board of Direct Taxes for the vigilance matters. The Directorate General interfaces with the Central Vigilance Commission, the Central Bureau of Investigation, field formations of CBDT who are also having their Vigilance wings and others in all the matters relating to Vigilance, preliminary investigation of complaints, obtaining CVC/CVO's first stage advice, wherever required, assistance to Ministry in issuance of charge sheets, monitoring the charge sheet issued by the Disciplinary authorities in the field, monitoring of progress in inquiry proceedings, processing of enquiry reports, obtaining CVC/CVO's second stage advice, wherever required and communication thereof to Disciplinary authorities and monitoring compliance/implementation of the advice.

== Central Vigilance Commissioners ==
The following have held the post of the Central Vigilance Commissioners.

List of Central Vigilance Commissioners
No.	Name	Took office	Left office
1	Nittoor Srinivasa Rau	19 February 1964	23 August 1968
2	Subimal Dutt	28 October 1968	16 February 1972
3	B. K. Acharya	9 September 1972	8 September 1977
4	M. G. Pimputkar	17 September 1977	30 April 1980
5	Ram Krishna Trivedi	30 October 1980	18 June 1982
6	R. P. Khanna	8 July 1982	7 July 1985
7	U. C. Agarwal	8 July 1985	7 July 1988
8	C. G. Somiah	17 October 1988	26 March 1990
9	T. U. Vijayasekharan	4 April 1990	3 April 1995
10	N. Vittal	3 September 1998	2 September 2002
11	P. Shankar	3 September 2002	2 September 2006
12	Pratyush Sinha	7 September 2006	6 September 2010
13	P.J.Thomas	7 September 2010	3 March 2011
14	Pradeep Kumar	14 July 2011	28 September 2014
15	Rajiv	29 September 2014	9 June 2015
16	K. V. Chowdary	10 June 2015	9 June 2019
17	Sharad Kumar	10 June 2019	24 April 2020
18	Sanjay Kothari	25 April 2020	23 June 2021
19	Suresh N Patel	24 June 2021	24 December 2022
20	Praveen Kumar Srivastava	28 December 2022	2 August 2026
21	A.S. Rajeev	3 August 2026	

== Limitations of CVC ==
- CVC is only an advisory body. Central Government Departments are free to either accept or reject CVC's advice in corruption cases.
- CVC does not have adequate resources compared with number of complaints that it receives. It is a very small set up with a sanctioned staff strength of 299, while it is supposed to check corruption in more than 1500 Union departments and ministries.
- CVC cannot direct CBI to initiate inquiries against any officer of the level of Joint Secretary and above on its own. Such a permission has to be obtained from the department concerned. However, this provision was declared unconstitutional by Supreme court in 2014. The court had stated that merely the post of a person could not keep him above the law, further stating that section 6 of the Delhi Special Police is violative of fundamental right Article 14.
- CVC does not have powers to register criminal case. It deals only with vigilance or disciplinary cases.
- CVC has supervisory powers over CBI. However, CVC does not have the power to call for any file from CBI or to direct CBI to investigate any case in a particular manner. CBI is under administrative control of Department of Personnel and Training (DoPT), which means that the powers to appoint, transfer and suspend CBI officers lie with DoPT.
- Appointments to CVC are indirectly under the control of the Union government, though the leader of the Opposition (in Lok Sabha) is a member of the committee to select CVC and VCs, as the candidates that are to be put up before it are decided by the Union government; the committee can only consider the candidates put up before it.

As a result, the CVC has neither resources nor powers to inquire and take action on complaints of corruption that may act as an effective deterrence against corruption.

== Controversies ==
=== Supreme court quashes appointment of CVC ===
PJ Thomas was appointed as the Chief Vigilance Commissioner in September 2010, on the recommendation of a High Powered Committee (HPC) headed by the Prime Minister. The selection of the new CVC was marked by controversies, after Sushma Swaraj, who was part of three-member selection committee, objected to the choice of Thomas, citing the pending chargesheet against him. A public interest litigation was filed in the Supreme Court by Centre for Public Interest Litigation and India Rejuvenation Initiative.

On 3 March 2011, the Supreme Court quashed the appointment of Thomas as the Chief Vigilance Commissioner, noting that the HPC did not consider the relevant materials on the pending chargesheet. Subsequently, Thomas resigned.

=== Whistleblower protection ===
A few years after the murder of IIT Kanpur alumnus NHAI engineer, the CVC launched an initiative to protect whistleblowers. However, this programme has been criticized by ex-Chief Justice of India R.C. Lahoti as being ineffective. He said that he had on previous occasions through his NGO India Rejuvenation Initiative, tried to draw the attention of high officials in the CVC to the unsatisfactory manner of its functioning, but with no results.

=== Petition against appointment of K V Chowdary ===
Before K V Chowdary's appointment, Supreme Court lawyer and Rajya Sabha MP Ram Jethmalani as well as lawyer and activist Prashant Bhushan raised a red flag, asking the Prime Minister not to go ahead with his appointment, raising severe objections on Chowdary's tenure as CBDT Chief. After Chowdary was appointed, Jethmalani expressed disappointment and wrote a letter to Narendra Modi questioning Chowdhary's credentials. NGO Common Cause represented by Prashant Bhushan has filed a petition in the Supreme Court challenging K V Chowdary's appointment as CVC and T M Bhasin's appointment as VC on 22 July.

== New initiatives ==
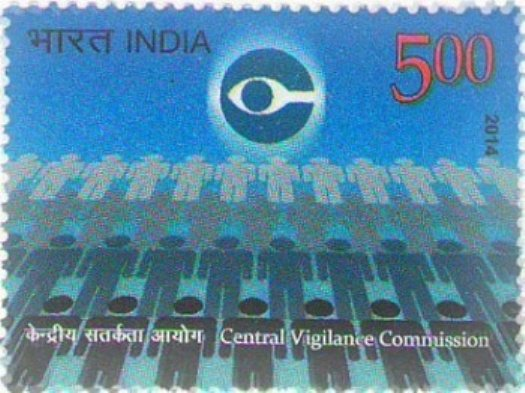
Stamp of India 2014 Central Vigilance Commission

The following initiatives have been taken by CVC:

1. National Anticorruption Strategy
2. Leveraging Technology to Prevent Corruption
3. Integrity in Public procurement
4. Awareness Campaign
5. Provision for Whistle Blowers
6. Improving the Standard of Vigilance Work
7. Computerisation of Commission's Work
8. Modern Preventive Vigilance Framework
9. International Cooperation. etc.

== Vigilance Awareness Week ==
Driven by the Central Vigilance Commission, Vigilance Awareness Week (VAW) is being celebrated every year and coincides with the birthday of Sardar Vallabhbhai Patel, known to be a man of high integrity. To make a New India by the year 2022, which is the 75th anniversary of Indian independence from the British Raj, the VAW is being celebrated in promoting integrity and eradicating corruption.

=== Vigilance Awareness Week – Theme for 2019 ===
In 2019, the CVC observed VAW from 28 October 2019 to 2 November 2019 with the theme "Integrity – A way of life" ("ईमानदारी के साथ आत्म निर्भरता").

=== Vigilance Awareness Week – Theme for 2020 ===
The theme for VAW 2020, observed from 27 October to 2 November was "Vigilant India, Prosperous India"

=== Vigilance Awareness Week – Theme for 2021 ===
The theme for VAW 2021 was "Self Reliance with Integrity”.

=== Vigilance Awareness Week – Theme for 2022 ===
The theme for VAW 2022 is "Corruption Free India for a Developed nation"

=== Vigilance Awareness Week – Theme for 2023 ===
The theme for VAW 2023 is "Say no to corruption, commit to the Nation"

=== Vigilance Awareness Week – Theme for 2026 ===
The theme for VAW 2026 is "Vigilance - Probity for Prosperity"

== See also ==
- Central Bureau of Investigation (CBI)
- Hawala scandal
- Ranjana Kumar
- Whistleblower protection in India
