= Comptroller and Auditor General of India =

Supreme audit institution of India

- Emblem of The Government of India

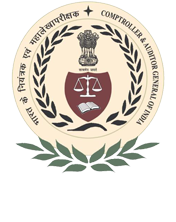
- Incumbent; K Sanjay Murthy, IAS since 21 November 2024
- Audit Department
- Abbreviation: CAG
- Reports to: President of India
- Residence: New Delhi, Delhi
- Nominator: Prime Minister of India
- Appointer: President of India
- Term length: 6 years or up to 65 yrs of age (whichever is earlier)
- Constituting instrument: Article 148 of the Constitution of India
- Inaugural holder: V. Narahari Rao
- Deputy: Deputy Comptrollers and Auditors General of India
- Salary: ₹250,000 (US$2,600) per month
- Website: Official Website

The Comptroller and Auditor General of India is the supreme audit institution of India, established under Article 148 of the Constitution of India. They are empowered to audit all receipts and expenditure of the Government of India and the State Governments, including those of autonomous bodies and corporations substantially financed by the government. The CAG is also the statutory auditor of Government-owned corporations and conducts supplementary audit of government companies in which the government has an equity share of at least 51 percent or subsidiary companies of existing government companies. The CAG is also the statutory auditor of the Lokpal.

The reports of the CAG are laid before the Parliament/Legislatures and are taken up for discussion by the Public Accounts Committees (PACs) and Committees on Public Undertakings (COPUs), which are special committees in the Parliament of India and the state legislatures. The CAG is also the head of the Indian Audit and Accounts Department, the affairs of which are managed by officers of Indian Audit and Accounts Service, and has 43,576 employees across the country (as on 01.03.2020).

In 1971, the central government enacted the Comptroller and Auditor General of India (Duties, Powers, and Conditions of Service) Act, 1971. The provisions relating to audit are embodied in Sections 13 to 21, 23 and 24 of the Act. Section 13 of the Act enjoins on the Comptroller and Auditor General the duty to audit all expenditure from the Consolidated Fund of India, of each State and each Union Territory having a Legislative Assembly.

In 1976, CAG was relieved from accounting functions. Articles 148 – 151 of the Constitution of India deal with the institution of the CAG of India.

The CAG is ranked 9th and enjoys the same status as a sitting judge of Supreme Court of India in order of precedence. K Sanjay Murthy is the current CAG of India. He assumed office on 21 November 2024, and is the 15th CAG of India.

== Office of CAG ==
=== Appointment ===
The Comptroller and Auditor-General of India is appointed by the President of India.

=== Oath or affirmation ===
"I, (name of the person being appointed), having appointed Comptroller and Auditor-General of India do swear in the name of God/solemnly affirm that I will bear true faith and allegiance to the Constitution of India as by law established, that I will uphold the sovereignty and integrity of India, that I will duly and faithfully and to the best of my ability, knowledge and judgement perform the duties of my office without fear or favour, affection or ill-will and that I will uphold the Constitution and the laws."

=== Duties of the CAG ===
As per the provisions of the constitution, the CAG's (DPC) (Duties, Powers and Conditions of Service) Act, 1971 was enacted. As per the various provisions, the duties of the CAG include the audit of:

- Receipts and expenditure from the Consolidated Fund of India and of the State and Union Territory having legislative assembly.
- Trading, manufacturing, profit and loss accounts and balance sheets, and other subsidiary accounts kept in any Government department; Accounts of stores and stock kept in Government offices or department.
- Government companies as per the provisions of the Companies Act, 2013
- Corporations established by or under laws made by Parliament in accordance with the provisions of the respective legislation.
- Authorities and bodies substantially financed from the Consolidated Funds of the Union and State Governments. Anybody or authority even though not substantially financed from the Consolidated Fund, the audit of which may be entrusted to the CAG.
- Grants and loans given by Government to bodies and authorities for specific purposes.
- Entrusted audits e.g. those of Panchayati Raj Institutions and Urban Local Bodies under Technical Guidance & Support (TGS).

=== Compensation ===
The salary and other conditions of service of the CAG are determined by the Parliament of India through the Comptroller and Auditor-General (Duties, Powers and Conditions of Service) Act, 1971. His salary is the same as that of a judge of the Supreme Court of India. Neither the salary nor the rights of the CAG in respect of leave of absence, pension or age of retirement can be varied to his disadvantage after his appointment. He is not eligible for further office either under the Government of India or under the government of any state after he has ceased to hold his office. These provisions are in order to ensure the independence of CAG.

Salary of CAG
Date	Salary
1 January 2016	₹250,000 (US$2,600)

=== Removal ===
The CAG can be removed only on an address from both houses of parliament on the ground of proved misbehavior or incapacity. The CAG vacates the office on attaining the age of 65 years or 6-year term, whichever is earlier or by impeachment proceedings.

== Scope of audits ==
Audit of government accounts (including the accounts of the state governments) in India is entrusted to the CAG of India who is empowered to audit all expenditure from the Consolidated Fund of the union or state governments, whether incurred within India or outside, all revenue into the Consolidated Funds and all transactions relating to the Public Account and the Contingency Funds of the Union and the states. Specifically, audits include:

- Transactions relating to debt, deposits, remittances, Trading, and manufacturing
- Profit and loss accounts and balance sheets kept under the order of the President or Governors
- Receipts and stock accounts. CAG also audits the books of accounts of the government companies as per Companies Act.

In addition, the CAG also executes performance and compliance audits of various functions and departments of the government. Recently, the CAG as a part of thematic review on "Introduction of New Trains" is deputing an auditors' team on selected trains, originating and terminating at Sealdah and Howrah stations, to assess the necessity of their introduction. In a path-breaking judgement, the Supreme Court of India ruled that the CAG General could audit private firms in revenue-share deals with government.

The CAG has been a regular member of the United Nations' Panel of External Auditors, and has previously served as the chairman of its board of auditors, after being elected in 2011. The CAG is at present serving as external auditor of two UN organizations:

- Food and Agriculture Organization of the United Nations (FAO)
- World Health Organization (WHO)

== Suggested Reforms ==
As the CAG, Vinod Rai was constantly in the limelight for its reports exposing mega corruption, particularly in 2G spectrum case, Commonwealth Games scam, Coal mine allocation scam and others. In November 2009, the as CAG, he requested the government to amend the 1971 Audit Act to bring all private-public partnerships (PPPs), Panchayati Raj Institutions and societies getting government funds within the ambit of the CAG. The amendment further proposes to enhance CAG's powers to access information under the Audit Act. In the past, almost 30% of the documents demanded by CAG officials have been denied to them. The PPP model has become a favourite mode of executing big infrastructure projects worth millions of rupees and these projects may or may not come under the audit purview of the CAG, depending on sources of funds and the nature of revenue sharing agreements between the government and the private entities. As of 2013, it is estimated that 60 percent of government spending does not come under the scrutiny of the CAG.

In June 2012, Lal Krishna Advani, a veteran Indian politician and former Deputy Prime Minister of India (as well as former Leader of the Opposition in Indian Parliament), suggested that CAG's appointment should be made by a bipartisan collegium consisting of the prime minister, the Chief Justice of India, the Law Minister and the Leaders of the Opposition in the Lok Sabha and the Rajya Sabha. Subsequently, M Karunanidhi, the head of Dravida Munnetra Kazhagam (DMK) party and five times Chief Minister of Tamil Nadu, supported the suggestion. Advani made this demand to remove any impression of bias or lack of transparency and fairness because, according to him, the current system was open to "manipulation and partisanship". Similar demand was made by many former CEC's such as B B Tandon, N Gopalaswamy and S Y Quraishi; however, the government did not seem too keen.

CPI MP Gurudas Dasgupta wrote a letter to the PM and demand CAG be appointed by the collegium of consisting the PM, the CJI and the leader of the opposition in Lok Sabha but the PM declined. Former CAG V. K. Shunglu has suggested in its CWG scam report that CAG be made a multi-member body.

PMO Minister V.Narayanasamy in his interview with PTI said Government is considering the Shunglu panel report but PM and Finance Minister declined it. Later V. Narayanasamy said he misquoted but PTI reaffirmed it.

In November 2025, the CAG announced that two centralized specialised cadres would be created within the Indian Audit and Accounts Department. One cadre would be for audit of Revenue and the other for audit of Expenditure. It is expected to be operationalized by January 2026. It is expected that having specialized cadres for Revenue and Expenditure audits would help deepen the domain expertise in the respective audits.

== Prominent audit reports ==
"CAG is not a munimji or an accountant or something like that... He is a constitutional authority who can examine the revenue allocation and matters relating to the economy. CAG is the principal auditor whose function is to go into the economy, effectiveness and efficiency of the use of resources by the government. If the CAG will not do, then who else will do it"

— Observation of a bench of Supreme Court of India while dismissing a petition challenging CAG reports on 2G spectrum, Coal Blocks Allotment, etc.

=== 2G Spectrum allocation ===
A CAG report on issue of Licences and Allocation of 2G Spectrum resulted in a huge controversy. The report estimated that there was a presumptive loss of ₹176,600 crore (US$18 billion) by the United Progressive Alliance (UPA) government. In a chargesheet filed on 2 April 2011 by the investigating agency Central Bureau of Investigation (CBI), the agency pegged the loss at ₹31,000 crore (US$3.2 billion)

All the speculations of profit, loss and no-loss were put to rest on 2 February 2012 when the Supreme Court of India on a public interest litigation (PIL) declared allotment of spectrum as "unconstitutional and arbitrary" and quashed all the 122 licenses issued in 2008 during tenure of A. Raja (then minister for communications & IT in the UPA government) the main accused. The court further said that A. Raja "wanted to favour some companies at the cost of the public exchequer" and "virtually gifted away important national asset".

Revenue loss calculation was further established on 3 August 2012 when according to the directions of the Supreme Court, Govt of India revised the reserve price for 2G spectrum to ₹14,000 crore (US$1.5 billion).

However, the special court in New Delhi acquitted all accused in the 2G spectrum case including prime accused A Raja and Kanimozhi on 21 December 2017, the verdict was based on the fact that CBI could not find any evidence against the accused in those 7 years. Per the judgement, "Some people created a scam by artfully arranging a few selected facts and exaggerating things beyond recognition to astronomical levels."

=== Coal mine allocation ===
A 2012 CAG report on coal mine allocation received massive media and political reaction as well as public outrage. During the 2012 monsoon session of the Parliament, the BJP protested the government's handling of the issue demanding the resignation of the prime minister and refused to have a debate in the Parliament. The deadlock resulted in Parliament functioning only seven of the twenty days of the session.

The CAG report criticised the government by saying it had the authority to allocate coal blocks by a process of competitive bidding, but chose not to. As a result, both public sector enterprises (PSEs) and private firms paid less than they might have otherwise. In its draft report in March, the CAG estimated that the "windfall gain" to the allocatees was ₹1,067,300 crore (US$110 billion). The CAG Final Report tabled in Parliament put the figure at ₹185,600 crore (US$19 billion)

While the initial CAG report suggested that coal blocks could have been allocated more efficiently, resulting in more revenue to the government, at no point did it suggest that corruption was involved in the allocation of coal. Over the course of 2012, however, the question of corruption came to dominate the discussion. In response to a complaint by the BJP, the Central Vigilance Commission (CVC) directed the CBI to investigate the matter. The CBI named a dozen Indian firms in a First Information Report (FIR), the first step in a criminal investigation. These FIRs accuse them of overstating their net worth, failing to disclose prior coal allocations, and hoarding rather than developing coal allocations. The CBI officials investigating the case have speculated that bribery may be involved.

=== Fodder scam ===
The scandal was first exposed due to the CAG report in the matter in December 1995. The report alleged of fraudulent withdrawal of government funds worth ₹950 crore (US$99 million) in the Bihar animal husbandry department against non-existent supplies of fodder and medicines. Subsequently, based on Patna High Court's orders, CBI investigated the case and registered as many as 63 cases. Many accused have been convicted while many cases are still under trial.

=== Krishna-Godavari (KG) D-6 gas block ===
The oil ministry imposed a fine of ₹7,000 crores on Mukesh Ambani's company for the sharp drop in production of gas and violations mentioned in CAG's 2011 report. Oil ministry did not approve company's US$7.2 billion stake in deal with BP. So Jaipal Reddy known for his honesty was shifted from oil ministry to the Science and Technology ministry owing to pressure from Reliance group of Industries. RIL allowed the CAG to begin the audit in April this year after stalling it for a year. But unresolved issues could stall audit of KG Basin again. Then Government appointed Defence Secretary Shashikant Sharma as new CAG to audit KG Basin, said Prashant Bhushan. In KG D-6, most of the cost had been recovered by the private player and the increase in price would only go as profit. About 90% of receipts from K-G D-6 were so far booked as expenditure and in the remaining 10%, only 1% was paid to the government and rest 9% went to the operator as profit.

== List of CAGs of India ==
This is a list of all CAGs of India from British India to present Republic of India:

=== Auditor-General of British India (1860–1947) and Dominion of India (1947–1950) ===
Auditor-General of India (1860–1950)
No.	Auditor General of India	Tenure began	Year tenure ended
1	Edmund Drummond	1860	1862
2	R. P. Harrison	1862	1867
3	E. F. Harrison	1867	1879
4	W. Waterfield	1879	1881
5	James Westland	1881	1889
6	E. Gay	1889	1891
7	S. Jacob	1891	1898
8	Arthur Frederick Cox	1898	1906
9	O. J. Barrow	1906	1910
10	Robert Woodburn Gillan	1910	1912
11	Sir Frederic Gauntlett	1912	1914
12	Sir R. A. Gamble	1914	1918
13	Sir Frederic Gauntlett	1918	1929
14	Sir Ernest Burdon	1929	1940
15	Sir Alexander Cameron Bandedoch	1940	1945
16	Sir Bertie Monro Staig	1945	1948
17	V. Narahari Rao	1948	1950

=== Auditor-General of Republic of India (1950–present) ===
Comptroller and Auditor General of India (1950–present)
No.	Portrait	Comptroller and Auditor General of India	Tenure Began	Tenure Ended
1		V. Narahari Rao	1950	1954
2		Anil Kumar Chanda	1954	1960
3	—	A. K. Roy	1960	1966
4	—	S. Ranganathan	1966	1972
5	—	A. Baksi	1972	1978
6	—	Gyan Prakash	1978	1984
7		Tirlok Nath Chaturvedi	1984	1990
8	—	C. G. Somiah	1990	1996
9	—	V. K. Shunglu	1996	2002
10	—	Vijayendra Nath Kaul	2002	2008
11		Vinod Rai	2008	2013
12		Shashi Kant Sharma	2013	2017
13		Rajiv Mehrishi	2017	2020
14		Girish Chandra Murmu	2020	2024
15		K Sanjay Murthy	2024	Present

== See also ==
- Government of India
- Public Accounts Committee of India
- Indian Audit and Accounts Service
- Order of precedence in India
- List of office-holders in India
- Constitutional bodies of Indian Government
- List of scandals in India
- Committee on Public Undertakings
- List of Indian parliamentary committees
- List of Indian commissions
- List of agencies of the government of India
- Salaries of government officials in India
