= Public Account (India) =

Indian central government fund

The Public Account of India was constituted by Article 266(2) of the Indian Constitution which states that "All other public moneys received by or on behalf of the Government of India or the Government of a State shall be credited to the public account of India or the public account of the State, as the case may be." Here "other" signifies other than the Consolidated Fund of India.

It deals with the money received by the Indian Government, i.e. state provident funds, various pre-deposits under national small savings fund, depreciation and reserve funds of departmental undertakings, national defense fund, etc. are paid into public accounts. These funds do not belong to the government, they have to be paid back at some time to their rightful owners. The government is merely acting as a banker in the transactions of public account.

Because of this nature of the fund, expenditures from it are not required to be approved by the Indian Parliament.

The Public Account of India is divided under 5 heads. These are :1.Small Savings, provident fund and other account.2.Reserve Funds,3.Deposit and Advances,4.Supreme and miscellaneous and 5. Remittances
