= Beenu Rajpoot =

Indian documentary film director (born 1979)

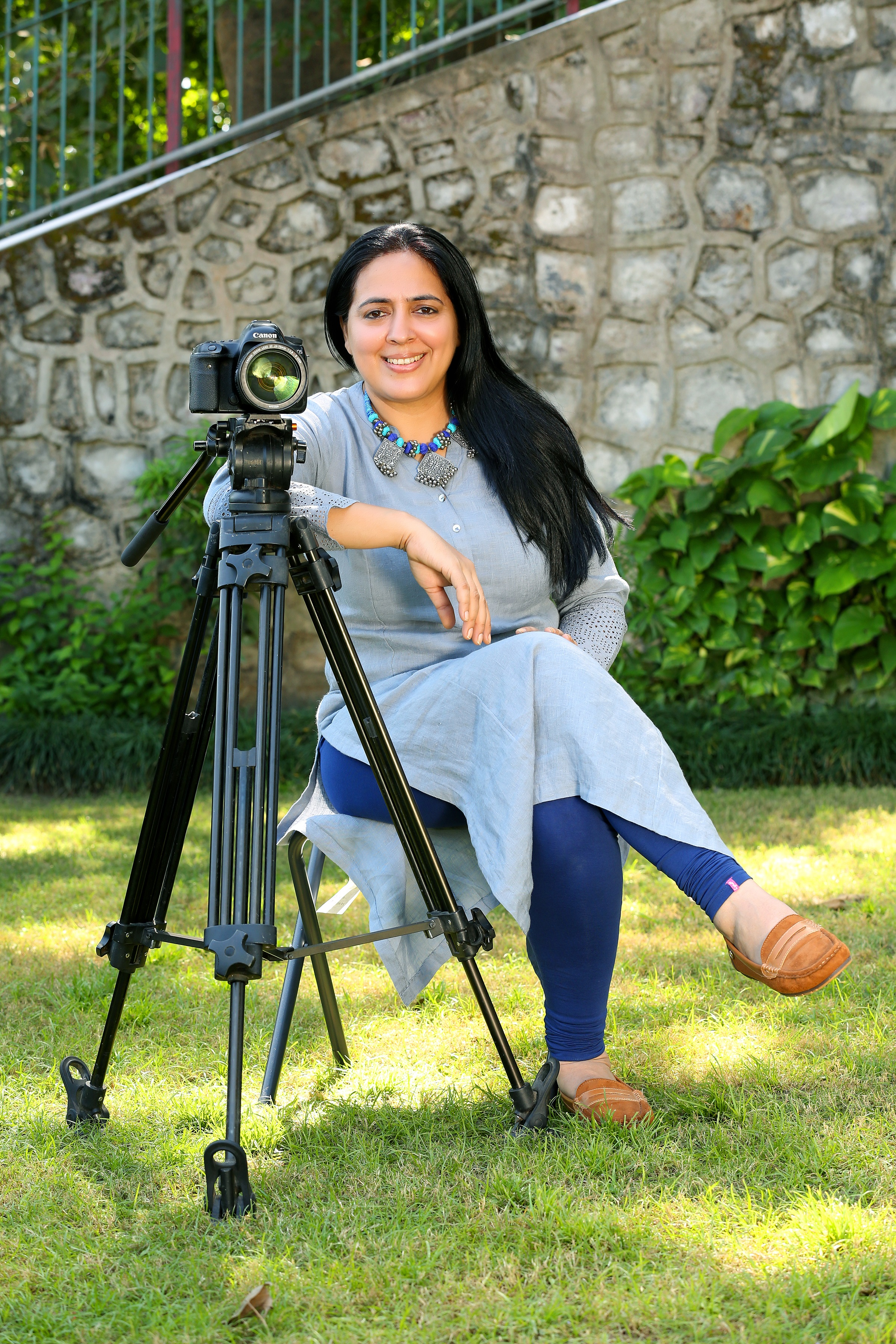
- Born: 31 August 1979 (age 46); Talwara, Punjab, India
- Occupations: Film director, producer and Writer
- Notable work: Born to Dance, Kaba-e-Hindostan, Bhakt Bhagwat, Lama Mani
- Website: beenurajpootfilms.com

Beenu Rajpoot (born 31 August 1979) is an Indian film director and producer. She has directed multiple films and produced several national and international documentary films. She is the founder of Beenu Rajpoot Films, a production house based in Delhi.

In March 2021, Beenu Rajpoot was selected as a Fit India Champion by the Ministry of Youth Affairs and Sports, Government of India.

== Early life and education ==
Rajpoot, was born on 31 August 1979 in Talwara, Punjab. She comes from a small Punjabi town where filmmaking was not common. She finished her graduation from Hans Raj Mahila Maha Vidyalaya, Jalandhar, Punjab. Beenu Rajpoot has a post-graduation degree in Philosophy from Panjab University, Chandigarh. She also holds two other Master's degrees in Yoga from Uttarakhand University and a Master's in Mass Communication from Indira Gandhi National Open University, Delhi. She has also a Diploma in Camera and Photography from IIPC, Delhi and CCYPI course from Morarji Desai National Institute of Yoga, Ministry of Ayush, Govt. of India.

Rajpoot is an alumna of Philosophy Department, Panjab University.

Rajpoot is a notable alumna and vice president of the HMV Alumnae Association of Hans Raj Mahila Maha Vidyalaya, Jalandhar, Punjab.

== Career ==
In 2023, Beenu Rajpoot launched "Wings of Vision" magazine, approved by Registrar of the Newspapers for India. The Governor of Punjab, Shri Banwarilal Purohit, released the first copy of the magazine.

=== Film career ===
Rajpoot started her film career with the Mentor Mike Pandey, and she worked with him as a researcher on an episode of his TV show Earth Matters. Most of her films have been approved by (CBFC) Central Board of Film Certification.

In 2016, she came up with her first film independently and she gave extensive research and two long years to give shape to the film. "Born to Dance" was based on the life of Kathak dancer Shovana Narayan. This film was released on 11th Oct 2016 at India International Centre (IIC), Delhi. This film was later shown in Chandigarh, where it was well-received by the audience.

In 2017, Rajpoot directed Wall of Valour - A Tribute to Martyrs. The film was based on Border Security Force (BSF) martyr Rocky, who saved the lives of 44 people in a terrorist attack. The film was screened at Panjab University and many cities. The film is first released in Yamunanagar, Haryana, where Rocky lived. After that, Punjab University, Indo-Tibetan Border Police (ITBP), and BSF screened the film in Chandigarh. Rajasthan Police Academy also screened this film many times.

In 2018, Rajpoot directed and produced a film "Kaba-e-Hindostan: Ghalib’s Ode to Banares: Charagh-e-dair". The film is based a journey taken by Mirza Ghalib to Banares. Ghalib's much acclaimed poem “Chirag-i-Dair” (Temple lamps) was composed during his trip to Banares in the spring of 1827. This film was first screened on 17 February 2018 at India Islamic Cultural Centre Delhi in 2018. This film has been screened in Banaras, Jalandhar (Punjab), Panjab University Chandigarh, Sangeet Natak Academy Chandigarh, and Hamdard University, Delhi.

In 2019, Rajpoot directed and produced a documentary film Beyond Belief: The Real Mythbuster. The 32-minute documentary several successful visually impaired people, including Padhmashri awardee Shekhar Naik. This film showed that disability does not mean you have no ability. This film was first screened on December 3, 2019, at the Alliance Française de Delhi. The Rajya Sabha TV covered this film.

During COVID-19, Beenu directed another short documentary film, Reunion, in 2020. Her hostelmate friend conceptualized the film. While the lockdown has sparked the creativity of many, a group of women, all 1997-batch pass-outs from HMV College in Jalandhar, have created their own version of a lockdown film.

In 2021, Rajpoot made a documentary Hamari Dharohar based on the history of Hans Raj Mahila Maha Vidyalaya.

In 2022, another documentary film Kathak Log of Kathak Villages directed by Beenu Rajpoot and produced by Shovana Narayan. The film is based on a book Kathak Lok. The Indira Gandhi National Centre for the Arts in Delhi first screened the documentary on April 30, 2022.

Beenu directed and produced "Bhakt Bhagwat: A Tiny Lover of Lord Krishna" in 2023. Her film Bhakt Bhagwat: A Tiny Lover of Lord Krishna is in the headlines. Bhagwat Das Brahmachari, a three-and-a-half-year-old servant (bhakt) of Lord Krishna, preaches Sanatan Dharma and Shrimad Bhagwat Geeta in this film. The Delhi NCUI auditorium showed this film on November 26, 2023, followed by the Jalandhar Hansraj Mahila Mahavidyalaya.

In the same year, Rajpoot directed "Lama Mani: A Story Teller in Arts," about Tibetan Buddhist monk and contemporary artist Lama Tashi Norbu and the old Tibetan tradition of Lama Mani. The Sebastiani Theatre in Sonoma, CA, USA hosted the documentary's first screening on November 19, 2023. Next, the documentary screened at NeueHouse in New York City on January 30, 2024; Tsechen Kunchab Ling Buddhist Temple in Walden, NY, on February 15, 2024.

In 2024, Rajpoot directed Bharat Ki Awaaz: Acharya Rama Kant Shukla, based on Rama Kant Shukla's work and life. The film was screened at Alliance Francaise Auditorium in Delhi. And the show was housefull.

== Gurus ==
Gurus have played a special role in Beenu Rajput's life. Beenu’s artistic foundation was established under the guidance of the renowned photographer O. P. Sharma, often referred to as the "God of Photography" in India. Under Sharma's guidance, she developed a keen attention to detail and a profound appreciation for visual storytelling—qualities that would subsequently form the foundation of her filmmaking style.

Her entry into documentary cinema was facilitated by three-time Green Oscar-winning filmmaker and environmentalist Mike Pandey. Beenu has worked as an assistant film director for him for several years.

== Filmography ==
=== As director ===
- Born to Dance: A Glimpse into the life of a dancer (2016)
- Mera Safer (2016)
- Wall of Valour (2017)
- Kaba-e-Hindostan: Ghalib's Ode to Banaras: Charagh-e-dair (2018)
- Mapping Kathak Villages (2018)
- Banaras: The Sacred City of World (2019)
- Beyond Belief: The real Mythbuster (2019)
- Reunion (2020)
- Hamari Dharohar (2021)
- Kathak Log of Kathak Villages (2022)
- Bhakt Bhagwat: A Tiny Lover of Lord Krishna (2023)
- Lama Mani (2023)
- Bharat Ki Awaaz: Acharya Rama Kant Shukla (2024)
- The Experimental Ecologist (2024)
- Lama Tashi Norbu (2024)

=== As producer ===
- Born to Dance: A Glimpse into the life of a dancer (2016)
- Kaba-e-Hindostan: Ghalib's Ode to Banaras: Charagh-e-dair (2018)
- Beyond Belief: The real Mythbuster (2019)
- Oneness (2019)
- An Artist (2019)
- Bhakt Bhagwat: a Tiny Lover of Lord Krishna (2023)

=== As writer ===
- Born to Dance: A Glimpse into the life of a dancer (2016)
- Kaba-e-Hindostan: Ghalib's Ode to Banaras: Charagh-e-dair (2018)
- Beyond Belief: The real Mythbuster (2019)
- Oneness (2019)
- Our Own Planet (2021)
- Pink Moon (2001)
- Wall of Valour (2017)
- Surra Di Malika: Surinder Kaur
- Gurmeet Bawa: The queen of Punjabi ‘Folk’
- Jai Hind
- Dancing Wheels
- BRU Reangs
- Yoga: The Union of Mind, Body & Soul
- LAMA MANI - A Story Teller in Art (2023)

== Philanthropy ==
Rajpoot always promotes Indian Art & Culture and literature. In the year 2019, she formed a society named “AGRIMAA Society of Arts” in Delhi. She is the founder member of Precious Planet Charitable Trust (PPCT), Delhi.

== Bibliography ==
She is the writer of many journals and author of two books.

- "The Odyssey of An Experimental Ecologist" R. K. Kohli, 2024, Author: Beenu Rajpoot, ISBN 978-93-5886-332-1
- "Photographic Art", 2014, Publisher:Photographic Society of India Mumbai

== Awards and honours ==
- IDPA National Silver Award 2021 for Documentary Film
- Gold Medal in Photography by the Photographic Society of America (PSA).
- Sajjan Lal Purohit Memorial Award 2021 for Excellence in Documentary Films
- Awarded by Governor of Punjab LT. GEN. B. K. N. Chhibber on 16 July 1997 for her excellent performance in Republic Day Parade.
- National Award (Gold Medal) in Aero Modelling at National level VSC 1994 in Control Line Speed.
