= T. R. Satishchandran =

Indian civil servant (1929–2009)

Tumkur Ramaiah Satishchandran

8th Governor of Goa
- In office 16 January 1998 – 18 April 1998
- Appointed by: President of India (then, K. R. Narayanan)
- President: K. R. Narayanan
- Prime Minister: I. K. Gujral
- Chief Minister: Pratapsingh Rane
- Preceded by: P. C. Alexander
- Succeeded by: J. F. R. Jacob

9th Principal Secretary to the Prime Minister of India
- In office 12 June 1996 – 30 June 1997
- Prime Minister: H. D. Devegowda
- Preceded by: Amar Nath Verma
- Succeeded by: N. N. Vohra

Chief Secretary of Karnataka
- In office December 1983 – October 1987
- Chief Minister: Ramakrishna Hegde

Personal details
- Born: Tumkur Ramaiah Satishchandran; April 14, 1929 Madras Presidency, British India (now, Karnataka, India)
- Died: September 10, 2009 (aged 80) Bangalore, Karnataka, India
- Spouse: 1 (wife)
- Children: 2
- Awards: Padma Bhushan (2005)

Tumkur Ramaiah Satishchandran (14 April 1929 – 12 September 2009) was a Padma Bhushan–winning 1953 batch Indian Administrative Service officer of Karnataka cadre, who served as the Governor of Goa and also served as the 7th Principal Secretary to the Prime Minister of India, the Chief Secretary of Karnataka and Power Secretary of India.

== Education ==
Satishchandran had a graduate honours (BSc honours) degree in physics from Mysore University, a postgraduate diploma in electrical engineering from Indian Institute of Science, Bangalore, and a degree in social administration from the London School of Economics.

== Career ==
=== As an IAS officer ===
Satishchandran served in a number of important and key positions in the Government of Karnataka and the Government of India including Chief Secretary of Karnataka, Secretary (Industries), Director (Industries) and deputy commissioner and district magistrate of districts in the Karnataka government; and as the Union Power Secretary, a secretary in the Cabinet Secretariat, Advisor (Energy) in the Planning Commission, director of the National Institute of Community Development and as a director in the now-erstwhile Ministry of Community Development in the Indian government.

==== Power Secretary of India ====
Satishchandran was appointed the Power Secretary of India by the Appointments Committee of the Cabinet (ACC); during his tenure as secretary in the now-erstwhile Ministry of Energy, Satishchandran was elected the president of World Energy Conference, a first for an Indian.

==== Chief Secretary of Karnataka ====
Satishchandran was appointed the Chief Secretary of Karnataka by the Chief Minister of Karnataka; he assumed the office of chief secretary in December 1983, and demitted it—whilst simultaneously retiring from service—in October 1987, after getting an extension of service from the Government of India of six months, following a request by the then-Karnataka chief minister, Ramakrishna Hegde, thus serving as the state's top bureaucrat for almost four years.

=== Post-IAS ===
After his retirement from the Indian Administrative Service, Satishchandran was appointed the director of Institute for Social and Economic Change; Satishchandran was later elevated to the position of the institute's chairperson.

==== Principal Secretary to the Prime Minister of India ====
Satishchandran was appointed by prime minister, H. D. Deve Gowda, through the Appointments Committee of the Cabinet (ACC), as his principal secretary; Satishchandran assumed the office of principal secretary in June 1996, and demitted it in June 1997.

==== Governor of Goa ====
Satishchandran was appointed the Governor of Goa by the President of India in January 1998, succeeding another former IAS officer P. C. Alexander; Satishchandran resigned from the position of the state of Goa's governor in April 1998, after a change in government.

== Death ==
Satishchandran died of an illness on 12 September 2009. On Satishchandran's death, former prime minister, H. D. Deve Gowda said, "I am deeply saddened and shocked to learn about the passing away of Mr Satish Chandran"; whereas the then-leader of opposition in Karnataka Legislative Council, V. S. Ugrappa said that the best way to pay tribute to a visionary such as Satishchandran was to follow the examples set by them. The council observed a minute's silence in the memory of Satishchandran and S. Rudrappa, a freedom fighter and former member of Karnataka legislative assembly, who also died in 2009.

== Honours ==
- Satishchandran was conferred the Padma Bhushan, India's third highest civilian honour, for civil service in 2005.
