= G-Files awards =

Annual award

Governance Files Awards
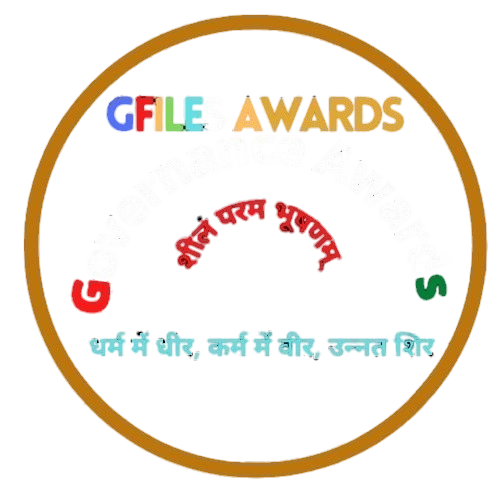
- Awarded for: Good Governance by Civil Servants
- Country: India
- Presented by: Gfiles
- First award: 2012
- Website: gfilesawards.com

Gfiles Award is an annual award presented to Civil Servants at the national level in India for extraordinary achievements in governance. This award is constituted by GFiles magazine, a national magazine on bureaucracy and governance. Winners are selected by a jury comprising former senior bureaucrats and without the intervention of the government.

The first award ceremony took place in 2012. The award ceremony takes place every year in Delhi. Recent award ceremony took place on 12 December at Civil Services Officers Institute(CSOI) where 13 Civil Servants were awarded.

== Jury ==
=== Prabhat Kumar (Former Cabinet Secretary, Govt. of India) ===
A 1964 batch UP Cadre IAS officer Sh. Prabhat Kumar has nearly forty years of rich and varied experience at various levels of governance from grassroots levels in the state to the highest level in the Center. He was the Cabinet Secretary of India during the Prime Ministership of Sh.Atal Bihari Vajpayee. Thereafter, he served as Governor of Jharkhand.

=== Anil Razdan (Former Secretary Power) ===
A B.Sc (Hons.) Physics graduate from St. Stephen's College and a law graduate of Delhi University Law Faculty, Sh. Anil Razdan joined the IAS in 1973 in the Haryana Cadre. After initial stints in Haryana, he moved to the Central Government as Additional and Special Secretary in the Ministry of Petroleum before taking over as Secretary, Ministry of Power. Highly respected as a visionary and man behind many path breaking initiatives in the power sector, he is today one of India's most eminent Energy Experts, Strategic Adviser and Consultant in the field of energy.

=== Vishnu Bhagwan (Former Chief Secretary Haryana) ===
A 1965 batch, Haryana cadre IAS officer Sh. Vishnu Bhagwan has held important positions in the State as well as the Central Government. Positions held by him include Excise & Taxation Commissioner, Deputy Commissioner, Sonepat & Faridabad, Principal Secretary to Chief Minister Om Prakash Chautala and later Chief Secretary Haryana. He was India's representative to the Food and Agricultural Organisation of the UN at Rome.

=== M.B. Kaushal (Former Secretary Internal Security) ===
An IPS officer of the 1963 batch, Sh. M B Kaushal served as Secretary Internal Security, Police & Department of Jammu & Kashmir in the Home Ministry. A recipient of Indian Police Medal for Meritorious Service and the President of India's Police Medal for Distinguished Service, during his illustrious tenure of service Sh. M B Kaushal also served as Director General of Central Reserve Police Force (CRPF) and Police Commissioner of Delhi.

== Categories of Awards ==
- Lifetime Achievement Award
- Special Jury Award
- Exceptional Contribution Award
- Excellent Contribution Award

== Awards Ceremony ==
Ceremony	Date	Venue	City	Chief Guest	Guest of Honour
1st Gfiles Awards	22 December 2012	Shangri-La Hotels and Resorts	Delhi	Salman Khurshid (External Affairs Minister)	Arup Roy Choudhury (CMD. NTPC) Sudhir Vasudeva (CMD. ONGC)
2nd Gfiles Awards	29 November 2013	India International Centre	Delhi	T. K. A. Nair (Advisor to P.M.)	Shekhar Dutt (Governor of Chhattisgarh) Pankaj Pachauri (Media Advisor to P.M.)
3rd Gfiles Awards	13 December 2014	India International Centre	Delhi	V.K. Singh (Minister of External Affairs)	Arup Roy Choudhury (CMD. NTPC) R.K Tyagi (CMD. Hindustan Aeuronautics Limited)
4th Gfiles Awards	28 November 2015	Civil Services Officers Institute (CSOI)	Delhi	Narendra Singh Tomar (Cabinet Minister of Steel)	Captain Abhimanyu (Finance Minister of Govt. of Haryana)
5th Gfiles Awards	26 November 2016	Civil Services Officers Institute (CSOI)	Delhi	Birender Singh (Minister of Steel)	Ram Bilas Sharma(Education Minister Govt. of Haryana)
6th Gfiles Awards	30 November 2018	Civil Services Officers Institute (CSOI)	Delhi	V.K. Singh (Minister of External Affairs)	Alphons Kannanthanam (Minister of Tourism)
7th Gfiles Awards	12 December 2019	Civil Services Officers Institute (CSOI)	Delhi	Nitin Gadkari (Minister of Road, Transport and Highways)	-

== Awardees ==
Year	Exceptional Contribution Award	Excellent Contribution Award	Special Jury Award	Life Time Achievement Award
2012	Armstrong Pame (IAS); Anil Swarup (IAS); Jyotsna Sitling (IFS); Ajit Balaji Joshi (IAS)	J. K. Tripathy (IPS); Aradhana Patnaik (IAS)	-	S. K. Misra (Retd. IAS)
2013	J.S. Deepak (IAS); Dr. Amarjit Singh (IAS); Abhayanand (IPS)	Santha Sheela Nair (IAS); Ashwani Lohani (IRES); Jayesh Ranjan (IAS); Atul N Patney (IAS)	-	E. Sreedharan (Advisor, Metro Rail)
2014	Dr. Shrikar Pardeshi (IAS); Dr. Shahid Iqbal Chaudhary (IAS); K.N. Kumar (IAS); Amitabh Kumar (IRS)	Balvinder Kumar (IAS); Dr. K. M. Abraham (IAS); Pratibha Singh (IFS); Rinkesh Roy (IRTS)	-	Ved Marwah (IPS)
2015	Dr. S. Vijaya kumar (IAS); Dr. Shalini Rajneesh (IAS); Jigmet Takpa (IFS); R.S. Nayak (Engineer); Ajay Singhal (IRRS)	P. K. Deshmukh (IAS); Rakesh Kumar Gupta (IAS); Amulya Kumar Patnaik (IPS); Meeran Chadha Borwankar (IPS); Anshul Mishra (IAS)	-	Anil Kakodkar (Nuclear Scientist)
2016	O.P. Singh (IPS); Saurabh Kumar (IRS); Sanjay Kumar (IFS); K. Balamurugan (IFS)	Sutirtha Bhattacharya (IAS); R.S.. Julania (IAS); N. Prasanth (IAS); Amit Lodha (IPS). Mandeep Singh Randhawa (IPS); Vikas Arya (IRSME)	-	Raghunath Anant Mashelkar (FRS)
2018	Harssh Poddar (IPS); R Krishnamurthi (IRS); U. Sagayam (IAS)	P. Narahari (IAS); Ritu Maheshwari (IAS); Ramesh Kumar Pandey (IFS); Roopa D Moudgil (IPS)	Amarjeet Sinha (IAS)	D.R. Mehta (Retd. IAS)
2019	Ruby Ahluwalia (IRAS); Umakant Umarao (IAS)	Devesh Chandra Srivastava (IPS); Siddharth Kaushal (IPS); Kundan Kumar IAS; Vikas Kumar (IPS); Dr. Renu Raj (IAS); Ronald Rose (IAS); Ashish Tiwari (IPS); Jitender Kumar Soni (IAS); Shashanka Ala (IAS)	Parameswaran Iyer (IAS (Retd.))	PROF. (Dr) Shiv Kumar Sarin
