= Sarla Grewal =

Indian Administrative Service Officer

9th Governor of Madhya Pradesh
- In office 31 March 1989 – 5 February 1990
- Chief Minister: Motilal Vora; Shyama Charan Shukla
- Preceded by: Kizhekethil Chandy
- Succeeded by: M. A. Khan

5th Principal Secretary to the Prime Minister of India
- In office 1985–1989
- Preceded by: P. C. Alexander
- Succeeded by: B. G. Deshmukh

Personal details
- Born: 4 October 1927
- Died: 29 January 2002 (aged 74)
- Education: Hans Raj Mahila Maha Vidyalaya

Sarla Grewal (4 October 1927 – 29 January 2002) was the second female Indian Administrative Service officer in India, when she joined IAS in 1952. She was the Governor of Madhya Pradesh (1989–1990). She was the principal secretary for Rajiv Gandhi.

In addition to the above-mentioned posts, she was Shimla's first deputy commissioner, Secretary to Prime Minister at WHO and UNICEF.

== Career ==
Grewal did her bachelor's from Hans Raj Mahila Maha Vidyalaya in Jalandhar, Punjab. After graduating, she joined IAS in 1952. Then in 1956, she was the Deputy Commissioner and was the first woman in India to be appointed to the post nationwide. She was awarded the British Council Scholarship at LSE on social services in developing countries, with special emphasis on health, education and society welfare schemes.

In 1963, she became the health secretary in Punjab and during her tenure Punjab received four awards for national family welfare. In 1985 Grewal was appointed PM's secretary.

Later in her life she became the chairman of Tribune Trust which she continued until her death.

== Death ==
Grewal died of pulmonary tuberculosis and chronic kidney failure on January 29, 2002.

== See also ==
- List of governors of Madhya Pradesh
