= Raghavendra P. Tiwari =

Indian academic

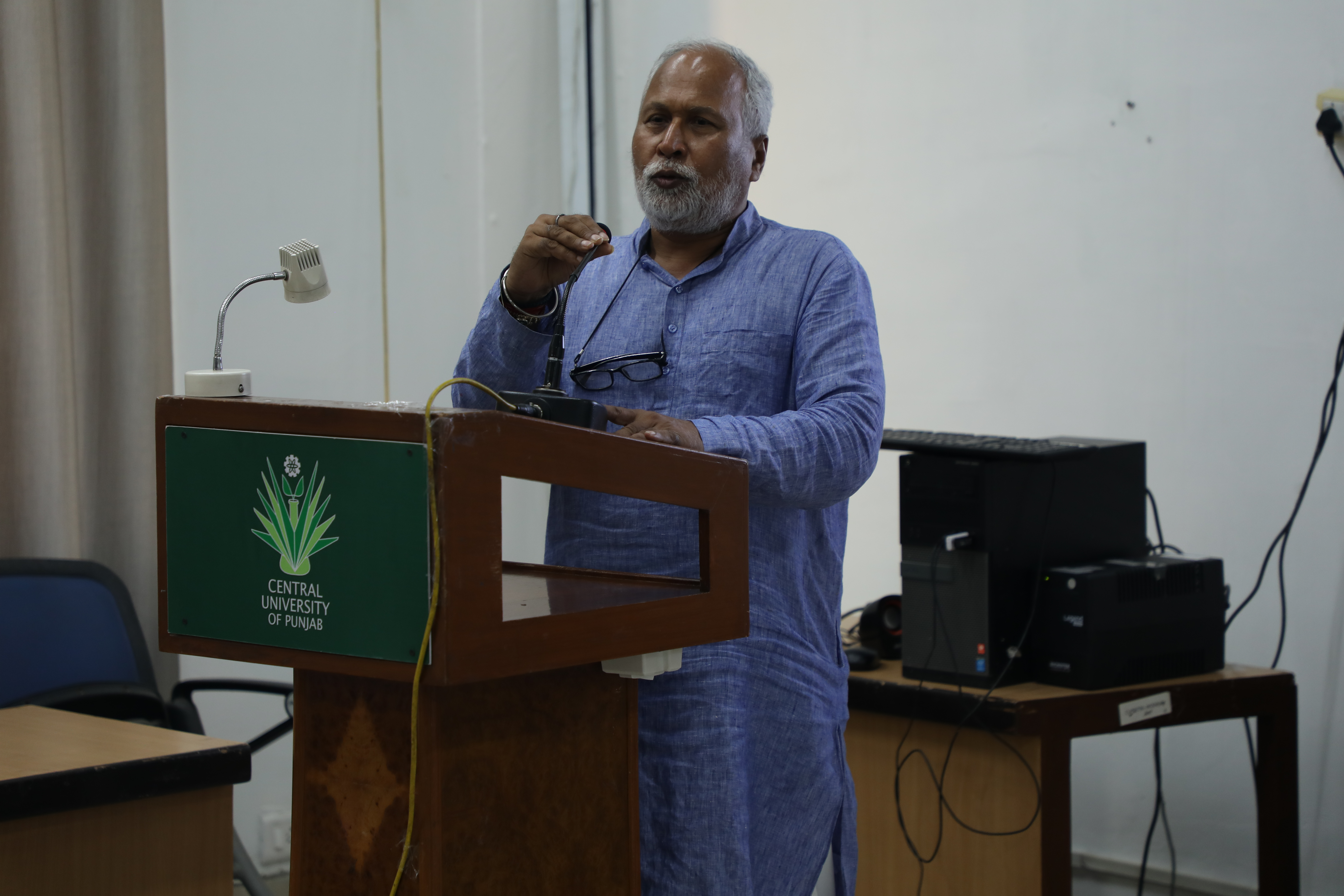
- Prof. Raghavendra P. Tiwari, Vice Chancellor, Central University of Punjab, Bathinda

Vice Chancellor of Central University of Punjab
- In office 22 August 2020 – 31 July 2026
- Preceded by: Prof. R. K. Kohli

Vice Chancellor of Dr. Hari Singh Gour University(Central University)
- In office 18 March 2015 – 22 August 2020
- Preceded by: Prof. Namdeo Gajbhiye
- Succeeded by: Prof. Neelima Gupta

Professor, Department of Geology at Mizoram University
- In office 12 April 1984 – 18 March 2015

Personal details
- Born: 1 January 1959 (age 67) Badraon Tiwariyan
- Education: Dr. Hari Singh Gour University, Gauhati University
- Occupation: Professor, Vice-Chancellor
- Profession: Teaching, Administration

Raghavendra P. Tiwari (born 1 January 1959) is former Vice Chancellor of Central University of Punjab, Bathinda. He has also served as the Vice-Chancellor in Dr. Hari Singh Gour University, Sagar M.P.

== Education ==
He completed his graduation from A.P.S. University, Rewa, M.P. and completed his PG degree in Applied Geology from Dr. Harisingh Gour Vishwavidyalaya, Sagar M.P. and Ph D degree in Palaeontology from Gauhati University. He is also specialized in GPS Geodesy and seismology. He is a pioneer in paleobiological and biostratigraphic research in India. He has supervised 18 doctoral thesis and successfully completed ten major research projects funded by Ministry of Science & Technology and the Ministry of Earth Sciences. He has published nearly 100 research papers in national and international journals. He has been in the editorial board of four national and international journals, and reviewer of five research journals. He has been a Member of the University Grants Commission and the Executive Council of NAAC, Bangalore.

== Books ==
- Tiwari, Raghavendra P, ed. (2011). Geodynamics, sedimentation and biotic response in the context of India-Asia collision: proceedings of the nation seminar, November 26-28, 2009. Bangalore: Geological Society of India. ISBN 978-81-907636-2-2. OCLC 841363520..
- Tiwari, Raghavendra P; Palaeontological Society of India; Centre of Advanced Study in Geology (2014). Indian Miocene: a geodynamic and chronologic framework for palaeobiota, sedimentary environments and palaeoclimates. ISBN 978-81-926033-2-2. OCLC 897871702..

== Career ==
He served for 32 years Mizoram University, in various capacities as the Head, Department of Geology, Dean of School of Studies for 13 years and Finance Officer (additional charge) besides serving as members of the Academic Council, Executive Council and the University Court, Member, Mizoram State Higher Education Council; Member, Governing Body and Research Advisory Council of Wadia Institute of Himalayan Geology, Dehradun; Member, Research Advisory Council of Birbal Sahni Institute of Palaeosciences (BSIP), Lucknow; Member, Exploration Research Advisory Committee of Atomic Mineral Division, North Eastern Region, Shillong and worked as Professor (HAG) in Geology in Mizoram University till 2015. He has headed several committee of UGC, Ministry of Education and Ministry of Science & Technology, Govt. of India concerning higher education.From August 3, 2026, he has been serving as Vice-Chancellor of Pragjyotishpur University, Assam.

== Awards ==
- L. Rama Rao Birth Centenary Award for significant contribution in Indian Stratigraphy & Palaeontology in 2012 by Geological Society of India, Bangalore.
- Dr. S. M. Naqvi Gold Medal Award for significant contribution in Indian Geology in 2014 by Geological Society of India, Bangalore.
