= Principal Secretary to the Prime Minister of India =

Chief of staff to the Indian Prime Minister

- भारत के प्रधानमंत्री के प्रधानसचिव
- State Emblem of India

- Flag of India

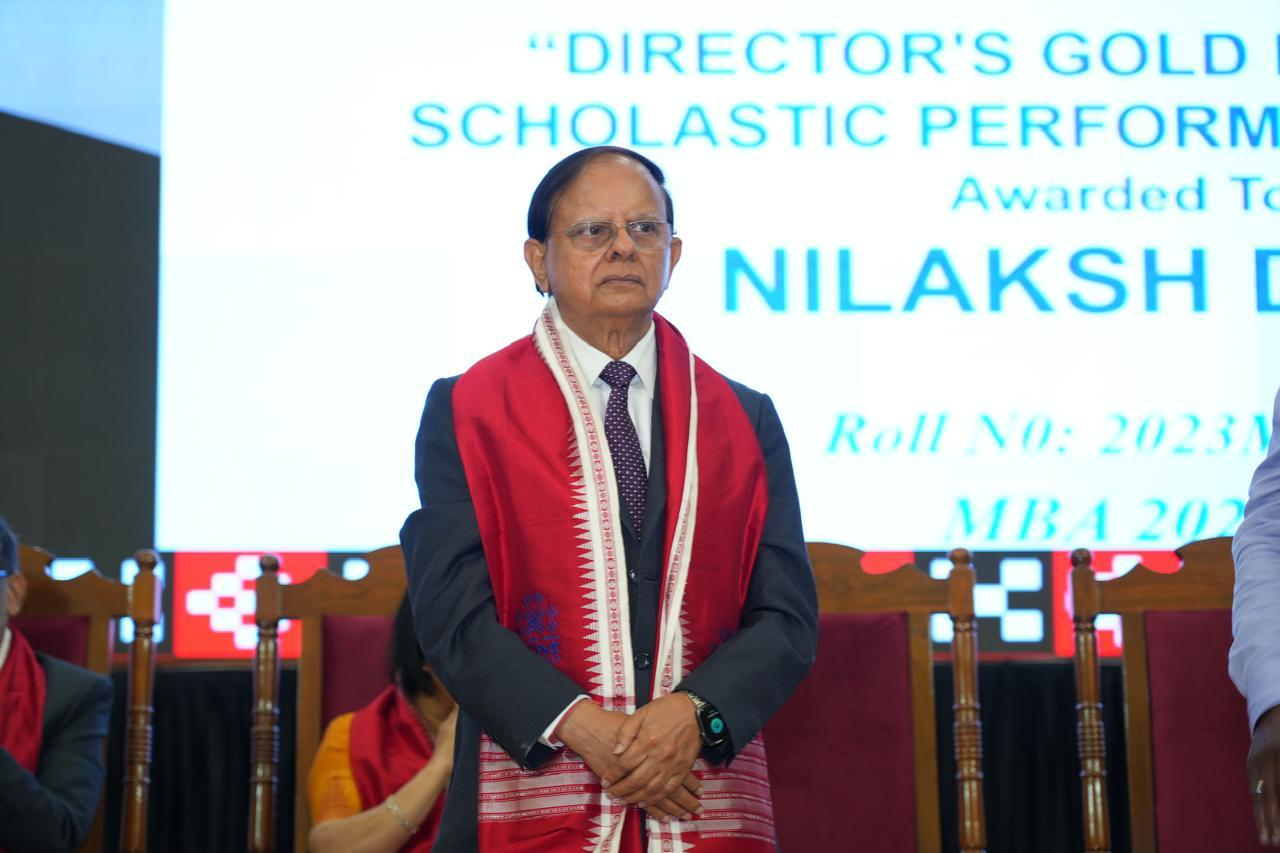
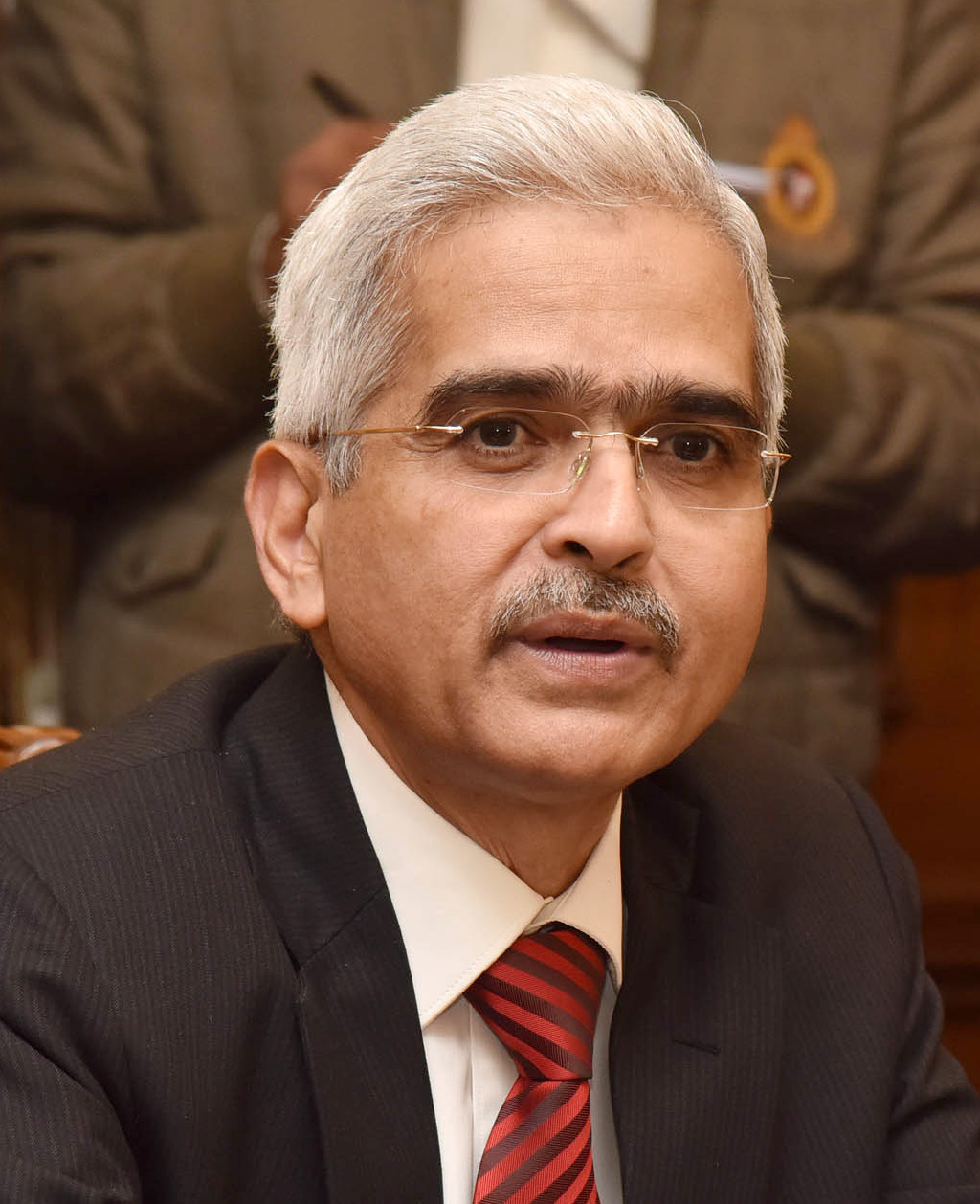
- Incumbent; Pramod Kumar Mishra and Shaktikanta Das since 11 September 2019 and since 22 February 2025
- Prime Minister's Office
- Abbreviation: PS to PM
- Reports to: The Prime Minister
- Seat: Prime Minister's Office, South Block, Secretariat Building New Delhi
- Appointer: Appointments Committee of the Cabinet
- Inaugural holder: P. N. Haksar
- Formation: 6 December 1971; 54 years ago

The Principal Secretary to the Prime Minister of India (PS to the PM; ISO: Bhārat Ke Pradhānmantrī Ke Pradhān Saciv) is the administrative head of the Prime Minister's Office. The officeholder is generally a retired civil servant, commonly from the Indian Administrative Service and occasionally from the Indian Foreign Service.

Since 2019, the officeholder has been accorded with the status of a cabinet minister. The office holder ranks 7th in the Order of Precedence of India.

== History ==
The Prime Minister's Secretariat (PMS)—headed by an officer of the rank of joint secretary to the Government of India—was established after independence under the prime ministership of Jawaharlal Nehru, as a successor to the office of the Governor-General of India's secretary. Lal Bahadur Shastri appointed Lakshmi Kant Jha, an Indian Civil Service officer, as his secretary, making Jha the first secretary to the Government of India-ranked officer in the PMS. During Indira Gandhi's tenure as prime minister, the post of Principal Secretary to the Prime Minister was created; with retired Indian Foreign Service officer P. N. Haksar becoming the first PS to the PM.

== Role ==
The Principal Secretary to the Prime Minister of India acts as the administrative chief of the Prime Minister's Office. The main functions of the officeholder often include, but are not limited to:

- Advising the prime minister on domestic and foreign policy matters.
- Overseeing the affairs of ministries and departments assigned by the prime minister.
- Coordinating activities in the Prime Minister's Office.
- Dealing with official, governmental, important paperwork in the Prime Minister's Office.
- Preparing notes on issues to be discussed by the prime minister with senior politicians, bureaucrats, and other dignitaries.
- Placing before the prime minister critical files of importance for approval and instructions.

The Principal Secretary to the Prime Minister is generally considered the latter's most crucial aide.

== Office holders ==
List of office holders of the Principal Secretary to the Prime Minister.

No.	Portrait	Principal Secretary to the Prime Minister of India	Took office	Left office	Time in office	Service	Prime Minister of India
1	P. N. Haksar	P. N. Haksar (1913–1998)	6 December 1971	28 February 1973	1 year, 84 days	Indian Foreign Service	Indira Gandhi (INC)
2	P. N. Dhar	P. N. Dhar (1918–2012)	1973	1977	4 years	-	Indira Gandhi (INC)
3	V. Shankar	V. Shankar	4 April 1977	31 July 1979	2 years, 118 days	Indian Administrative Service	Morarji Desai (JP)
4	P. C. Alexander	P. C. Alexander (1921–2011)	2 May 1981	18 January 1985	3 years, 261 days	Indian Administrative Service	Indira Gandhi (INC) (2 May 1981 – 31 October 1984); Rajiv Gandhi (INC) (31 October 1984 – 18 January 1985)
5	Sarla Grewal	Sarla Grewal (1927–2002)	25 September 1985	1 March 1989	3 years, 157 days	Indian Administrative Service	Rajiv Gandhi (INC) (1985 – 1989)
6	B. G. Deshmukh	B. G. Deshmukh (1929–2011)	27 March 1989	11 December 1990	1 year, 259 days	Indian Administrative Service	Rajiv Gandhi (INC) (27 March 1989 – 2 December 1989); V. P. Singh (JD) (2 December 1989 – 10 November 1990); Chandra Shekhar (SJP(R)) (10 November 1990 – 11 December 1990)
7	S. K. Misra	S. K. Misra (born 1932)	11 December 1990	24 June 1991	195 days	Indian Administrative Service	Chandra Shekhar (SJP(R))
8	Amar Nath Verma	Amar Nath Verma	25 June 1991	15 May 1996	4 years, 324 days	Indian Administrative Service	Narasimha Rao (INC)
9	T. R. Satishchandran	T. R. Satishchandran (1929–2009)	12 June 1996	30 March 1997	291 days	Indian Administrative Service	H. D. Deve Gowda (JD) (12 June 1996 – 21 April 1997); Inder Kumar Gujral (JD)
10	Narinder Nath Vohra	Narinder Nath Vohra (born 1936)	1 July 1997	19 March 1998	261 days	Indian Administrative Service	Inder Kumar Gujral (JD)
11	Brajesh Mishra	Brajesh Mishra (Note: Concurrently served as the first National Security Advisor from November 1998 to May 2004 (5 years, 6 months).) (1928–2012)	19 March 1998	22 May 2004	6 years, 64 days	Indian Foreign Service	Atal Bihari Vajpayee (BJP)
12	T. K. A. Nair	T. K. A. Nair (born 1939)	28 May 2004	3 October 2011	7 years, 128 days	Indian Administrative Service	Manmohan Singh (INC)
13	Pulok Chatterji	Pulok Chatterji (born 1948)	3 October 2011	26 May 2014	2 years, 235 days	Indian Administrative Service	Manmohan Singh (INC)
14	Nripendra Misra	Nripendra Misra (born 1945)	28 May 2014	11 September 2019	5 years, 106 days	Indian Administrative Service	Narendra Modi (BJP)
15	Pramod Kumar Mishra	Pramod Kumar Mishra (born 1948)	11 September 2019	Incumbent	7 years, 35 days	Indian Administrative Service	Narendra Modi (BJP)
16	Shaktikanta Das	Shaktikanta Das (born 1957)	22 February 2025	Incumbent	1 year, 236 days	Indian Administrative Service	Narendra Modi (BJP)

== Additional principal secretary ==
A prime minister—through the Appointments Committee of the Cabinet—can also appoint an additional principal secretary. The only instance of an additional principal secretary being appointed was in May 2014, Pramod Kumar Misra, a retired 1972-batch Gujarat cadre Indian Administrative Service (IAS) officer, was appointed by the Appointments Committee of the Cabinet to serve as newly elected Prime Minister Narendra Modi's additional principal secretary.

== Bibliography ==
=== Books ===
- Mehta, Dalpat Singh (1968). Handbook of Public Relations in India. New Delhi: Allied Publishers. ISBN 978-8170233343.
- Laxmikanth, M. (2014). Governance in India (2nd ed.). Noida: McGraw-Hill Education (published 25 August 2014). ISBN 978-9339204785.

=== Paper ===
- Singh, Karuna (July–September 2007). "Prime Minister's Office : A Critical Analysis". The Indian Journal of Political Science. 68 (3): 629–640. ISSN 0019-5510. JSTOR 41856360.
