= Shovana Narayan =

Indian Kathak dancer (born 1950)

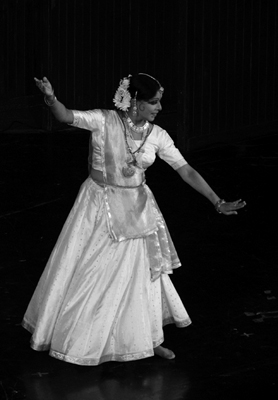
- Born: 2 September 1950 (age 76); West Bengal, India
- Occupation: Dancer
- Years active: 1970–present
- Spouse: Herbert Traxl
- Dancing career
- Dances: Kathak

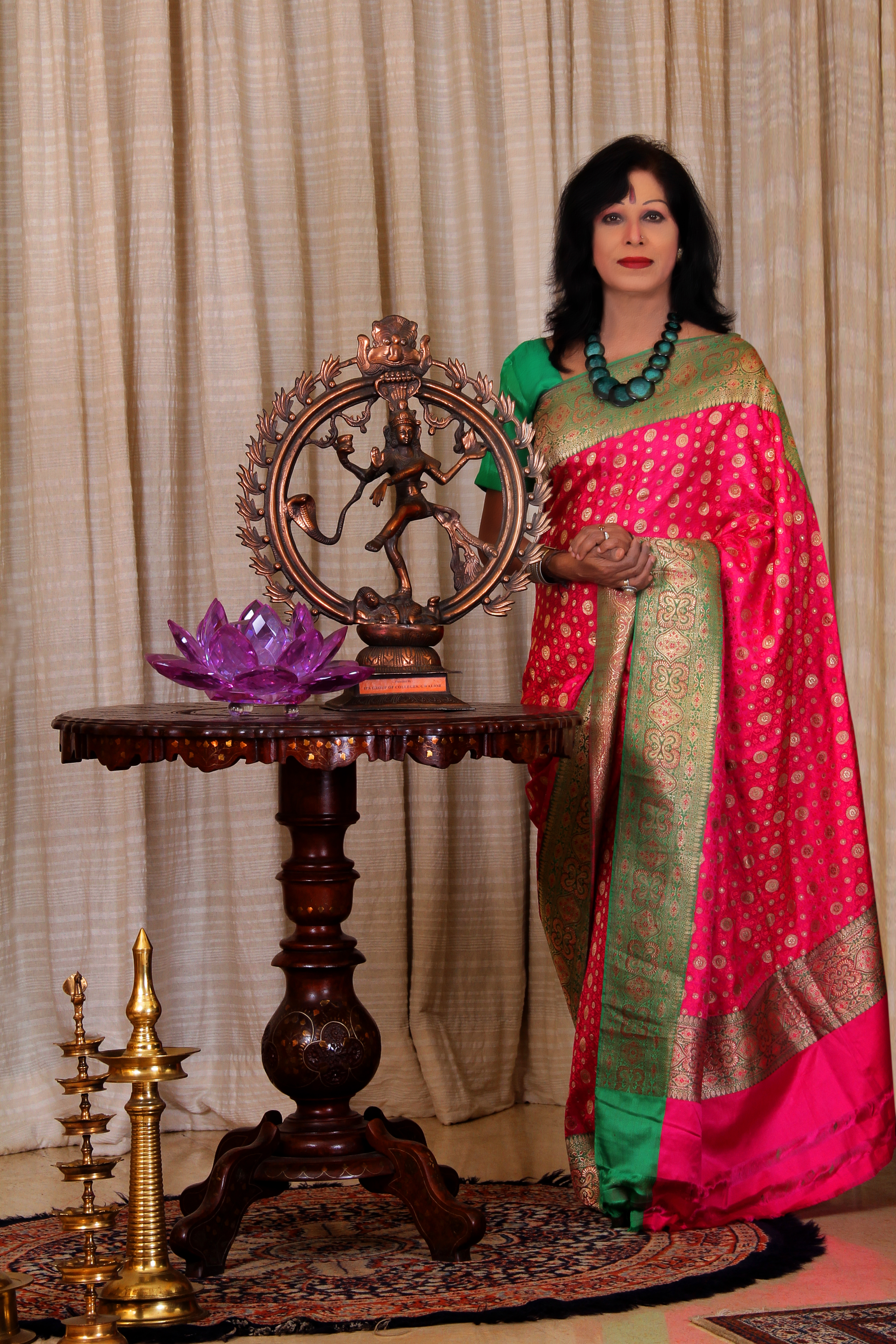

Shovana Narayan (born 2 September 1950) is a recognised Indian Kathak dancer and a career officer with Indian Audit and Accounts Service. She performs in India and internationally, and has been awarded the Padma Shri. She trained under Birju Maharaj.

== Biography ==
Sadhna Bose in Kolkata and Guru Kundal Lal in Mumbai initiated Narayan into Kathak at the age of four.

She studied at Miranda House in Delhi, India, graduating with a master's degree in physics in 1972. She completed M.Phil. in Defence and Strategic Studies from University of Madras in 2008 and MPhil in Social Sciences from Punjab University in 2001. She also worked as a career officer for the Indian Audits & Accounts Service and retired in 2010. She is married to Dr. Herbert Traxl, Austrian Ambassador to India (retired).

As a "performer and guru," Shovana Narayan has performed widely in several prestigious national and international festivals and before several heads of state and governments and has trained several Kathak artists of the young generation.

As a choreographer-performer, Shovana Narayan has worked with leading dancers of western classical ballet, flamenco, tap dance, Buddhist chants with Buddhist monks, as well as dancing the compositions of western classical composers. She was the creative director-producer-dancer of the first-ever trilogy involving western classical dance-Kathak-flamenco in "The Dawn After" in 1994. She was also the creative director of the opening and closing ceremonies of the 6th abylimpics 2003, held at New Delhi. She delivered the opening & closing ceremonies of the Commonwealth Games Delhi in 2010. She has spearheaded and produced several collaborative works with leading dancers of several Indian classical dance styles.

== Research and films ==
Shovana has researched and discovered 8 Kathak villages near Gaya with documentary and official records. She collaborated with Sanskrit & epigraphy scholar KK Mishra, who discovered Prakrit inscription in Asokan-Brahmi script relating to Kathak dated to the 4th century BC. She is the first dancer to have conceived, conceptualised and brought out a dance video on the philosophy and legend of the immortal Khajuraho temples entitled ‘Dance of the Temples’. She is the leading actor in films "Akbar’s Bridge" (Hindi) and "Das Geheimnis des Indisches Tanz" (German).

Shovana has authored 19 books and numerous articles Her research on Kathak villages led to the discovery of a living Temple Kathak tradition in the Gangetic belt as well as of several (19) Kathak villages, many of which had been allotted Census code numbers.

Over 80 articles with in-depth research were published in several national newspapers, recognised journals, etc. such as the Times of India, the Tribune, the Asian Age, in journals of Sangeet Natak Akademi, Rajasthan University, UNESCO, and several others.

In 2016, Documentary film maker Beenu Rajpoot made a film “Born to Dance” on the life of Shovana Narayan.

== Filmography ==
Shovana Narayan has been featured as the main protagonist in several dance-based and narrative films. Her notable screen work includes:

- Aavartan (2020–2021), a full-length feature film (116 minutes) in which she plays the lead role. The film was selected for the Indian Panorama section at the International Film Festival of India (IFFI), Goa, and was telecast on 21 January 2021. It was also showcased at other film festivals, including those in Bengaluru.
- Dance of the Temples (1999), a Hindi dance film centered on the architectural and spiritual heritage of Khajuraho.
- Moksha in Madurai (1997), an English-language dance film exploring philosophical themes through movement and narrative.
- Akbar’s Bridge (1996), a Hindi telefilm in which she appears in a leading role.

== Books ==
- Narayan, Shovana (1 February 1998). Rhythmic echoes and reflections: kathak. Roli Books. ISBN 978-81-7436-049-6.
- Narayan, Shovana; India. Ministry of Information and Broadcasting. Publications Division (1999). Dance legacy of Patliputra. Publications Division, Ministry of Information and Broadcasting, Govt. of India. ISBN 978-81-230-0699-4.
- Raghuvanshi, Alka; Narayan, Shovana; Pasricha, Avinash (2004). Kathak. Wisdom Tree. ISBN 978-81-86685-14-3.
- Narayan, Shovana (2003). Performing arts in India: a policy perspective. Kanishka Publishers, Distributors.
- Narayan, Shovana (14 March 2005). Indian Classical Dances. Sterling Publishers Pvt. Ltd. ISBN 978-1-84557-169-6.
- Narayan, Shovana (1 January 2004). Indian theatre and dance traditions. Harman Pub. House in association with Iādyant. ISBN 978-81-86622-61-2.
- Narayan, Shovana (2004). Folk Dance Traditions of India. Gurgaon: Shubhi Publication. ISBN 81-87226-93-5.
- Narayan, Shovana (4 December 2004). The Sterling Book of Indian Classical Dances. Sterling Publishers Pvt. Ltd. ISBN 978-1-84557-169-6.
- Narayan, Shovana; Vasudev, Uma (2005). Hariprasad Chaurasia, Romance of the Bamboo Reed. Gurgaon: Shubhi Publications. ISBN 81-8290-042-5.
- Narayan, Shovana (2007). Meandering Pastures of Memories. New Delhi: Macmillan. ISBN 978-1-4039-3102-3.
- मिश्र, कमल किशोर (2007). नटराज. Gurgaon, Haryana: Shubhi Publications. ISBN 978-81-8290-103-2.
- Mishra, Kamal Kishor (2013). Art, Architecture and Sculpture. Gurgaon : Jammu: Shubhi Publications; Dharmarth Trust. ISBN 81-8290-304-1.
- Narayan, Shovana (2017). "Wir Sind Östereicher!": Erwin Traxl (1884-1975): a story of survival, resilience and redemption. New Delhi: Rising Sun. ISBN 978-93-81781-28-9.
- Narayan, Shovana; Dua, Anita (2018). Illuminating Indian Classical Dances Through Yoga. Gurugram, India: Shubhi Publications. ISBN 978-81-8290-475-0.
- Narayan, Shovana (2019). Indian theatre traditions: drama, music and dance. Gurugram, India: Shubhi Publications. ISBN 978-81-8290-483-5.
- Narayan, Shovana; Kalha, Geetika (2022). Kathak Lok. New Delhi: Vitasta. ISBN 978-93-90961-42-9.
- Narayan, Shovana; Kalahā, Gītikā (2022). Kathaka loka (in Hindi). ISBN 978-81-8290-498-9.
- Narayan, Shovana; Kalha, Geetika (2022). Indian mythology through classical dance. Gurugram, Haryana, India: Shubhi Publications. ISBN 978-81-8290-499-6.
- Narayan, Shovana, ed. (2025). Ramayana in World Art and Thought. ISBN 978-81-8290-485-9.

== Books on Shovana Narayan ==
- ‘Kathak: The World of Shovana Narayan’ by Dr. Kamal Kishor Mishra (2006)
- ‘I am a Fleeting Moment in Time: Kathak Guru Shovana Narayan’ by Maya ‘Parijat’ (2025) ISBN 978-81-991712-0-6

== In popular culture ==
In 2022, documentary film maker Beenu Rajpoot directed a film "Kathak Log of Kathak Villages" on the life of Shovana Narayan. The film took four years to complete and it is based on a deeply researched book Kathak Lok; the film unearths little-known facts of the pre-Christian era roots of Kathak. The Indira Gandhi National Centre for the Arts in Delhi first screened the documentary on April 30, 2022.

== Awards and honours ==
- Govt. Of India's President Award of "PADMASHRI", 1992
- Govt of India's "Sangeet Natak Akademi Award" for 1999-2000 in 2001
- Delhi Govt's Sahitya Kala Parishad's "'Parishad Samman” for 1991-92 in 1993
- Bihar Govt's "'Rashtriya Samman” Award for 2018-19 in 2021
- Bihar Gaurav Award, 1987
- Priyadarshini Award 1989
- OISCA Award (Japan), 1990–91
- Rajiv Gandhi Award for Excellence, 1992
- Rajdhani Ratna Award, 1992
- Mahila Shringar Shiromani Award 1992, Rashtrapati Bhavan
- Rotary International Vocational Award, 1992
- Rajiv Smriti Puraskar, 1993
- Dadabhai Naoroji Award, 1993
- National Integration award, 1993
- Indira Gandhi Priyadarshini Samman, 1996
- CL Nepali Memorial Award 1999
- United Indians "Pride of the Nation Award 2000"
- Rashtriya Ratan Award 2021
- TP Jhunjhunwala National Excellence Award 2001-2002
- Top Cultural Ambassador Award by World Marketing Congress, IMM, 2002
- FICCI's FLO award, 2007
- Kelvinator's GR8Award, 2007
- Women's International Award, 2010
- International Congress of Women, 2010
- Kalpana Chawla Excellence Award, 2011
- WIN's (Women's International Network) Kiran Lifetime Achievement Award, 2011
- CNN IBN's Guru Shishya Award, 2012
- Bihari Asmita Samman 2012
- Inner Wheel's Women Achievers Awards 2012
- Guru ML Koser Award, 2013
- Guru Deba Prasad Award, 2013
- Parichay Award 2013, Bhubaneswar
- Art Karat Award, 2014
- Rotary's SHREYAS Award, 2013–14
- Bharat Nirman's SOCIAL RESPONSIBILITY Award, 2014
- Spandan Samman 2014, Kanpur
- Ustad Ashique Ali Khan Nritya Ratna Award 2015
- Dr APJ Abdul Kalam Award 2015
- "Shaksiyat" Award, 2015, International Women's Day Special
- 10th Baba Allauddin Khan Award, 2015
- Culture Education Ratna Awarad, 2017
- Ustad Chand Khan Award, 2017
- Ustad Chand Khan Award, 2017
- 8th Rajiv Gandhi Excellence Award, 2017
- Kabi Samrat Upendra Bhanja Award, 2017
- Amar Ujala Excellence Award, 2017
- Lord Beden Powell National Award 2018
- Gurugram Achievers Award 2018
- Shaktya Lifetime Achievement Award 2018, Bremen, Germany
- ICONIC Women with Spirit Award 2018
- Loknayak JP (Jaya Prakash) Award, 2019
- Vidushi Vidyottama Stree Shakti Samman, 2019
- Pt Dargahi Mishra "Nritya Shiromani 2019", Gurugram
- Weaving Dreams Lifetime Achievement and Excellence Award 2019
- 10th AIPA Spirit of Dance Award
- WEAA India Awards 2020
- Indira Gariyali Award 2020
- 4th Saraswati Sadhana Samman 2021
- Atal Bihari Bajpayi National Award 2021
- Bharatmuni Nrithyotsav, Bharatmuni Lifetime Achievement Award,2021
- 13th Guru Debaprasad Nrutya Parampara Award 2021
- Pt Ghanarang Sangeet Shiromani Award 2021
- Topgallant Media's National Women Pride Award 2021
- Women Innovator Award 2021
- ISAW (Institute of South Asian Women) Award 2022
- Stree Shakti Samman 2022 – decorated on 3rd Aug 2022
- Utsav Samman 2022
- Nritya Samrat Pt Birju Maharaj Award 2022, Pune
- Golconda Lifetime Achievement Award 2022
- WUD Critics Choice Award 2022
- Durga Shakti Award 2022
- World University of Design, Critics Choice Awards, 2022
- Institute of South Asian Women, Outstanding Doyen of Kathak, 2022
- Bharatmahotsav, Festival of one India, Bharat Gaurav Samman, 2023
- Sapphire SUBIJOYA Award 2023
- Women Lifetime Achievement Award 2023, AALEKH and Gunjan Foundation
- WOW Award Women of Wonders' 2023 IMS Ghaziabad
- Bhojpuri Icon', 2024, Filmfare-Femina
- ‘Sanskriti Samman', 2024, Calcutta University
- The department of Sanskrit, Calcutta, Vaisvik-Sanskrit-sanskriti- gaurva-samman, 2024
- "Scroll of Honour", 2025, TAAI
- Shikhar Samman', 2025, Bharatiya Vidya Bhavan
- Natraj Music and Dance Academy, Vysakhi Lifetime Achievement Award, 2025
- Bharat Pratibha Samman Council, Bharat Pratibha Samman, 2025
- Pravah Music Society, Pravah Kala Ratna Award,2025
- Sri Sai Natraja Academy of Kuchipudi Dance, 10th Meenakshi Amma Award for Excellence, 2025
- 'IPFEAST 4.0 'LEGENDS Award', 2025.
- 'His Highness Maharaja Martand Singh Ju Deo Lifetime Achievement award' 2025, 2025, Maharaja of Rewa.

== See also ==
- Indian women in dance
