= R. K. Kohli =

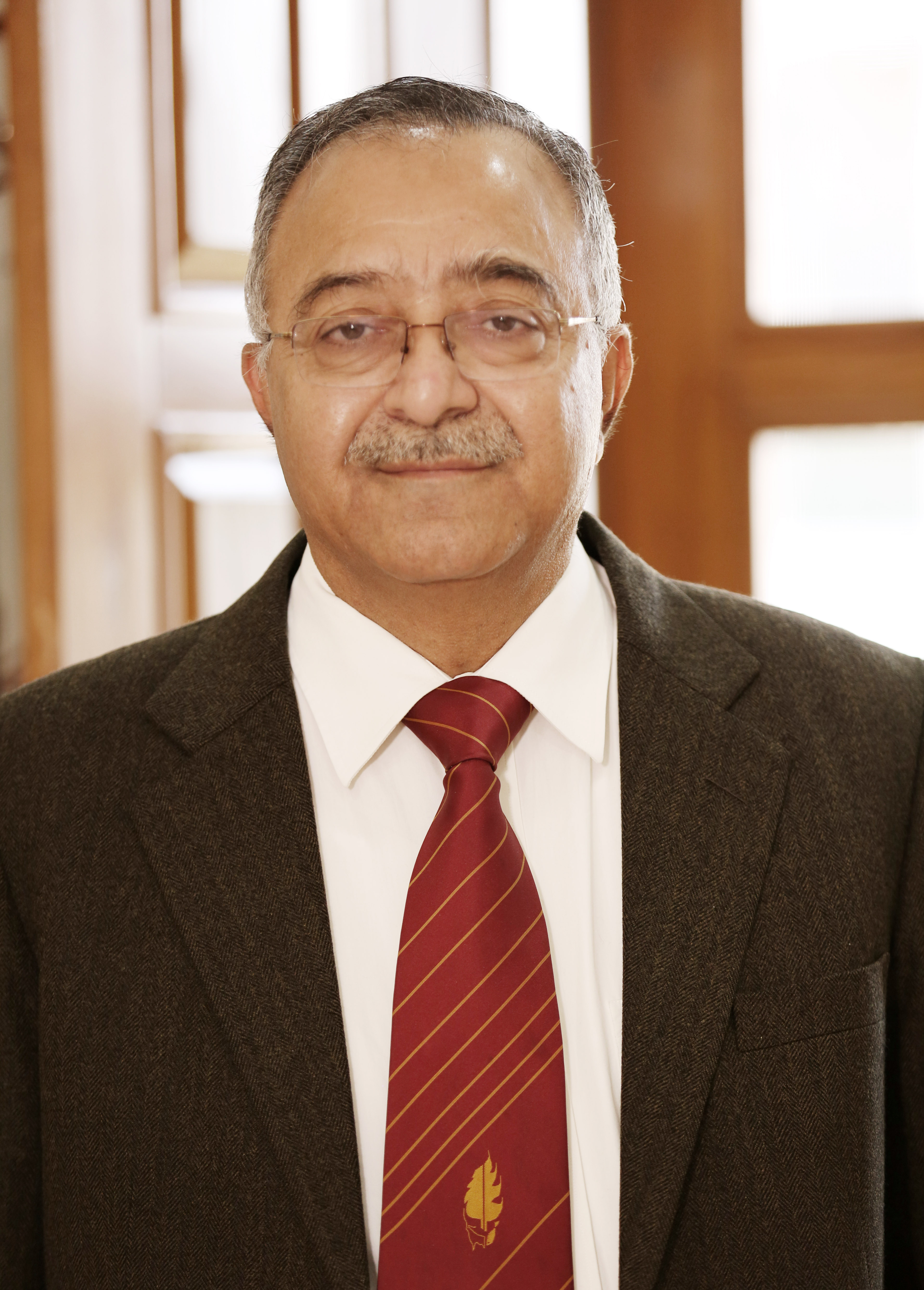

Vice-Chancellor, Amity University Punjab, Mohali, India
- In office 22 August 2020 – August 2025
- Preceded by: Dr. A. S. Grewal

Vice-Chancellor, Central University of Punjab
- In office 5 September 2014 – 20 August 2020
- Preceded by: Prof.Jai Rup Singh
- Succeeded by: Prof.Raghavendra P. Tiwari

Vice-Chancellor, DAV University, Jalandhar
- In office 13 April 2013 – 4 September 2014
- Preceded by: Position Established
- Succeeded by: Dr Ashok K Paul

Personal details
- Born: Baboo; 2 December 1953 (age 72) Gurgaon (Now Gurugram)
- Spouse: Dr Kumkum Kohli
- Children: 2 sons
- Education: Panjab University, CUP Bathinda, DAVC Jalandhar
- Occupation: Professor, Vice-Chancellor
- Profession: Teaching, Administration
- Website: "Professor R. K. Kohli". www.rkkohli.com.

Prof. R. K. Kohli (born 2 December 1953) is an Indian educational administrator. He is Vice-Chancellor of Amity University Punjab, Mohali since August 22, 2020. Prior to joining Amity University, Mohali. He worked as the 2nd Vice-chancellor of Central University Punjab (2014–20). He has also worked as the founder Vice Chancellor of DAV University, Jalandhar (2013–14). He has 47 years of experience in teaching and research since July 1975. He is an elected Fellow of the Indian National Science Academy, New Delhi (2011), The Indian Academy of Sciences, Bengaluru (2010), the National Academy of Sciences (India), Allahabad (now Prayagraj) (2004), National Academy of Agricultural Sciences, New Delhi, (2005), National Environmental Science Academy, New Delhi (2003). Certified Senior Ecologist by Board of Professional Certification, ESA, USA, since 2005 (4th term of 5 years). Member Executive Council, International Union of Biological Sciences, France.

Consecutively for the 3rd year, Ranked among the top 2% of scientists in the world as per Stanford University USA & Elsevier.

Vide Research.com, Ranked 472 in the world & 9th in India among the Best Scientists in Plant Sciences & Agronomy.

== Education ==
Kohli did his Doctoral research on 'Physiological and Biochemical Changes during Floral Initiation in Amaranthus"' in 1979 GNDU Amritsar.

== Awards ==
- Prof Birbal Sahni Medal Award, 2022 (Indian Botanical Society (Estd. 1920) for exemplary research in Botany.
- The most prestigious JC Bose National Fellowship of the Government of India, for the 2nd term of 5 years since 2017.
- Government of Haryana's Best Scientist Award for 2008-09, cash award Rs 1 lac, a citation and trophy.
- B.P. Pal National Environment Fellow – 2001 Union Ministry of Environment & Forests (highest award of MoEF).
- State Honour for Teaching and Research in Environment from UT Chandigarh Government, 1998.
- Chairman, State Expert Appraisal Committee for Environmental clearances developmental activities, Chandigarh.
- Awarded SAARC Chair in Chittagong University, Bangladesh, 2007-08.
- Adjunct Professor, Chinese Academy of Sciences, China at the XTBG, for 2 years 2007–2009.
- Punjab Rattan Award for Environment Science and Education, 2007-08.
- Dr. K.K. Nanda Memorial Oration Lecture Award at Dopoli Maharashtra, 2007.
- Dr. I.S. Grover Memorial Oration Lecture Award at GNDU, Amritsar (2023).
- Vijay Shree Award for Best Scientist, New Delhi, 2006.
- Nanda Memorial National Young Scientist Gold Medal Award for Research in Forestry, 1988.
- Felicitations at the International Conference on Environment and Biodiversity at Delhi University, 2008.
- Gregor Mendel Medal awarded in Brno, Czechoslovakia, 1979.
- UNESCO-WHO Post-doctoral Fellowship at Institute of Experimental Botany, Praha, Czechoslovakia 1978–79.

== Books ==
- Batish, Daizy R; Kohli, Ravinder K; Singh, Harminder Pal (2001). Allelopathy in agroecosystems. Food Products Press. ISBN 1-56022-090-2. OCLC 248170337.
- Kohli, R.K.; Jerath, N. (Neelima); Batish, D. (Daizy R.) (1996). Some facets of biodiversity. Society of Environmental Scientists and Punjab State Council for Science & Technology. ISBN 81-86657-00-2. OCLC 34943997.
- Bawa, Rajan; Khosla, P K; Kohli, R K (1995). Forestry improvement. Bishen Singh Mahendra Pal Singh. ISBN 81-211-0121-2. OCLC 35319096.
- Jose, Shibu; Singh, Harminder Pal; Batish, D; Kohli, R. K. (2013). Invasive plant ecology. CRC Press. ISBN 978-1-4398-8126-2. OCLC 1204882816.
- "The Odyssey of An Experimental Ecologist" R. K. Kohli, 2024, Author: Beenu Rajpoot, ISBN 978-93-5886-332-1
