= Institute of Liver and Biliary Sciences =

Coordinates: 28.5068854°N 77.1659994°E

Institute of Liver & Biliary Sciences (ILBS)

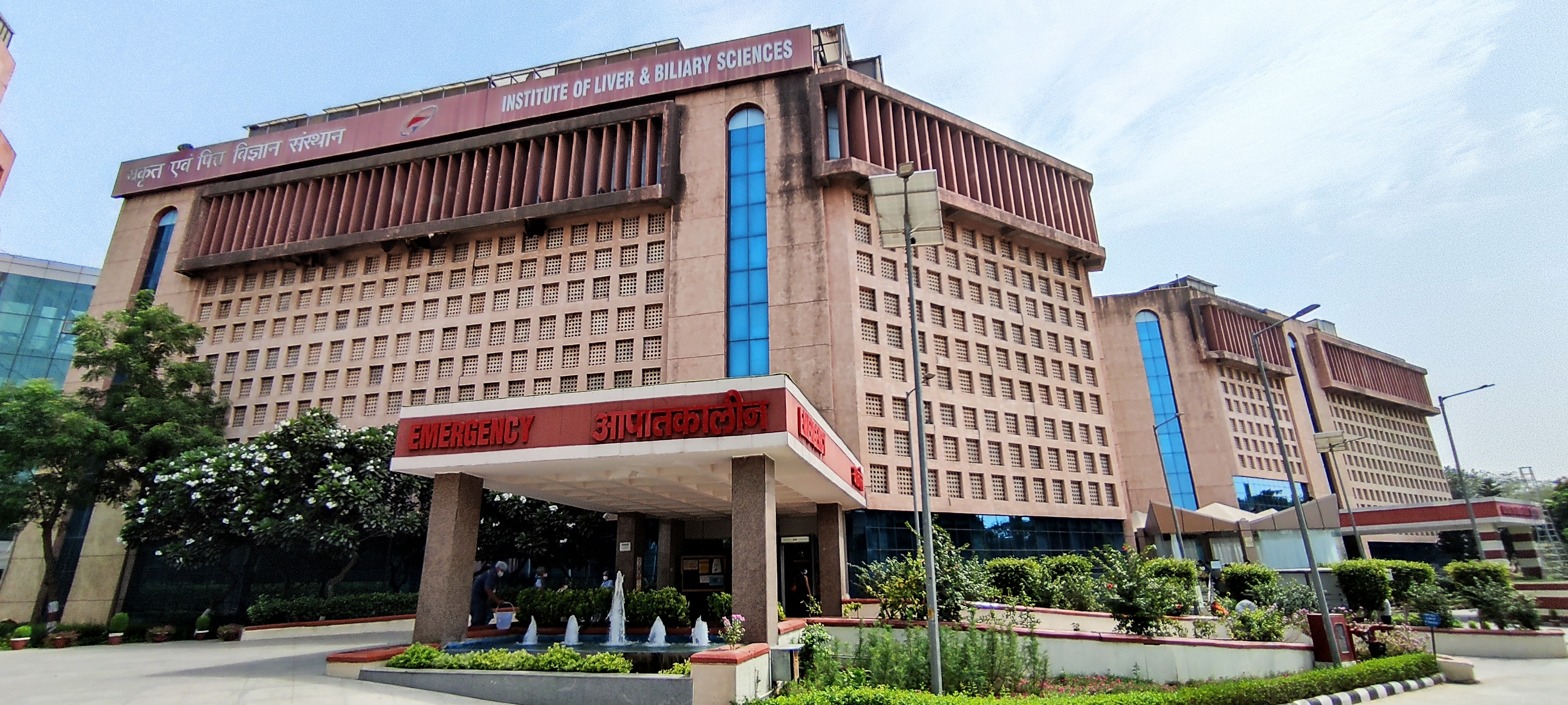
- The Institute of Liver & Biliary Sciences, New Delhi

Geography
- Location: D-1, Vasant Kunj, South West Delhi, Delhi, India

Organisation
- Type: Teaching

Services
- Emergency department: Emergency services available 24x7
- Beds: 155
- Speciality: Liver, Pancreas and Biliary Tract oncology urology

History
- Founded: 2009; 17 years ago

Links
- Website: Institute of Liver and Biliary Sciences

The Institute of Liver and Biliary Sciences (ILBS) is a mono-superspeciality hospital for liver and biliary diseases located at South West Delhi, India. It has been established by the Government of the National Capital Territory (NCT) of Delhi as an autonomous Institute, under the Societies Registration Act, 1860, at South West Delhi with Shiv Kumar Sarin as its founding director. ILBS is a teaching hospital and has been given the status of Deemed University by the University Grants Commission (UGC) of India. It was created by the Government of Delhi to make it a dedicated international center of excellence for the diagnosis and management of liver and biliary diseases and to provide advanced training and research in the field of Hepato-biliary Sciences.

== History ==
The foundation stone of ILBS was laid in 2003. The first phase of ILBS was built by the Public Works Department (PWD). The first phase was completed in 2009. The formal inauguration of the hospital took place on 14 January 2010 by the Chief Minister of Delhi, Mrs. Shiela Dixit.

== Specialties ==
ILBS is an education which is focused on Liver and Biliary Sciences, however, Nephrology an important sister branch of the hospital. The various other specialties provided by the hospital are support based Oncology, and Cardiology, along with other liver related specialties like Pediatric Hepatology, Pulmonary Medicine, Renal Transplant, Urology and Radiology. In the coronavirus pandemic, the institute was the pioneer in starting convalescent plasma therapy (an unproven and experimental procedure which is no longer recommended because of low benefit to harm ratio) for treating serious coronavirus patients in Delhi under the supervision of Dr Sarin.

== Rankings ==
University and college rankings

Medical – India
- NIRF (2024): 34

Institute of Liver & Biliary Sciences ranked 34th among medical colleges in India in 2024 by the National Institutional Ranking Framework (NIRF) medical ranking.
