= Interlocutor (politics) =

Informal diplomat

An interlocutor is someone who informally explains the views of a government and also can relay messages back to a government.

== Examples ==
- Narinder Nath Vohra, Government of India's former Special Representative for carrying out the Jammu and Kashmir Dialogue.
- Dineshwar Sharma, Government of India's former Special Representative for carrying out the Jammu and Kashmir Dialogue.
- R. N. Ravi, Government of India's former Special Representative for carrying out the Nagaland Peace Accord.
