= Narinder Nath Vohra =

Indian bureaucrat and politician

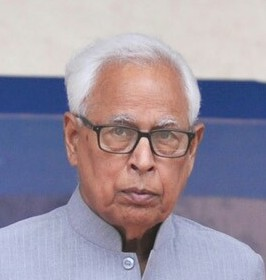

12th Governor of Jammu and Kashmir
- In office 25 June 2008 – 23 August 2018
- Chief Minister: Ghulam Nabi Azad; Omar Abdullah; Mufti Mohammad Sayeed; Mehbooba Mufti
- Preceded by: S. K. Sinha
- Succeeded by: Satya Pal Malik

10th Principal Secretary to the Prime Minister of India
- In office 1 July 1997 – 19 March 1998
- Appointed by: Appointments Committee of the Cabinet
- Prime Minister: I. K. Gujral
- Preceded by: T. R. Satishchandran
- Succeeded by: Brajesh Mishra

Home Secretary of India
- In office 1 April 1993 – 31 May 1994
- Appointed by: Appointments Committee of the Cabinet

22nd Defence Secretary of India
- In office 1 March 1990 – 1 April 1993
- Appointed by: Appointments Committee of the Cabinet
- Preceded by: T. N. Seshan
- Succeeded by: K. A. Nambiar

18th Defence Production Secretary of India
- In office 1 May 1989 – 1 March 1990
- Appointed by: Appointments Committee of the Cabinet
- Preceded by: P. C. Jain
- Succeeded by: N. Raghunathan

Personal details
- Born: Narinder Nath Vohra; 5 May 1936 (age 90) Punjab, India
- Spouse: Usha Vohra an IAS officer of 1960 batch
- Education: Panjab University; Queen Elizabeth House, University of Oxford
- Occupation: Retired IAS officer
- Awards: Padma Vibhushan (2007)

Narinder Nath Vohra (born 5 May 1936), popularly referred as N. N. Vohra, is a retired 1959 batch Indian Administrative Service officer of Punjab cadre who was the 12th governor of the Indian state of Jammu and Kashmir. He was the first civilian governor of Jammu and Kashmir in eighteen years after Jagmohan.

As an IAS officer, Vohra has also served as Principal Secretary to the Prime Minister of India, Home Secretary of India, Defence Secretary of India and Defence Production Secretary of India.

From February 2003 until he became the governor of the state, Vohra had been the Government of India's interlocutor in Jammu and Kashmir. He was awarded India's second highest civilian honour, the Padma Vibhushan, for his contributions to the field civil service, in 2007.

== Education ==
Vohra is a postgraduate (MA) and topper in English from Panjab University. Vohra also was a visiting fellow at Queen Elizabeth House, University of Oxford.

== Career ==
=== Before IAS ===
Before being appointed an IAS officer, Vohra served as lecturer in the Panjab University.

=== As an IAS officer ===
Vohra served in key positions for both the Government of India and the Government of Punjab, such as Secretary (Home), Commissioner and Secretary (Industries), Finance Commissioner, Commissioner (Urban Development), Secretary (Urban Development), Punjab's labour commissioner, Director (Information) and as Director (Panchayati Raj) in the Government of Punjab; as Union Home Secretary, Union Defence Secretary, Union Defence Production Secretary, additional secretary in the Department of Defence of the Ministry of Defence, joint secretary in the Ministry of Health and Family Welfare and as an area organiser in the Cabinet Secretariat in the Government of India.

Vohra also served as a consultant to the World Health Organization.

==== Defence Production Secretary ====
Vohra was appointed Union Defence Production Secretary by the Appointments Committee of the Cabinet (ACC), he assumed the office of Defence Production Secretary on 1 May 1989, and remitted it on 1 March 1990.

==== Defence Secretary ====
Vohra was appointed Union Defence Secretary by ACC, he assumed the office of Defence Secretary on 1 March 1990, and demitted it on 1 April 1993, serving for more than three years.

==== Home Secretary ====
N. N. Vohra was appointed Union Home Secretary by ACC after the 1993 Bombay serial bomb blasts, he assumed the office of Home Secretary on 1 April 1993, and demitted it and simultaneously superannuated from service on 31 May 1994.

=== Post-retirement ===
==== Principal Secretary to the Prime Minister ====
N. N. Vohra was appointed Principal Secretary to the Prime Minister of India, Inder Kumar Gujral, and the administrative head of Prime Minister's Office by ACC in June 1997, he assumed the office of principal secretary on 1 July 1997, and demitted it on 19 March 1998.

==== India’s special representative for carrying out the Jammu and Kashmir dialogue ====
N. N. Vohra was appointed India's interlocutor for carrying out the Jammu and Kashmir dialogue by the Government of India in 2003, he remained as India's interlocutor till 2008, when he was appointed Governor of Jammu and Kashmir.

As the interlocutor, Vohra had been holding wide-ranging discussions with both the elected representatives in the state and also the separatists in a bid to forge a common ground for the all-round development of the state.

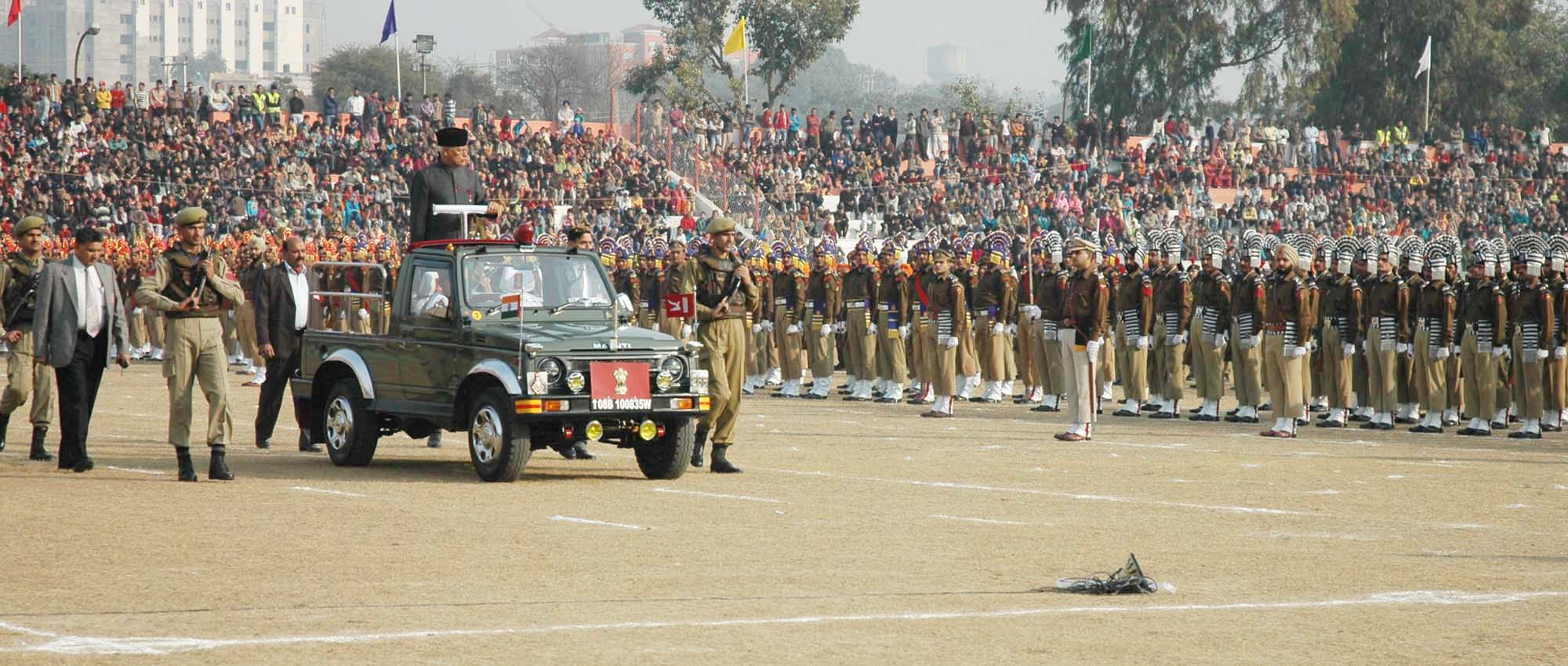
Vohra taking salute from Jammu and Kashmir Police on 61st Republic Day of India

==== Governor of Jammu and Kashmir ====
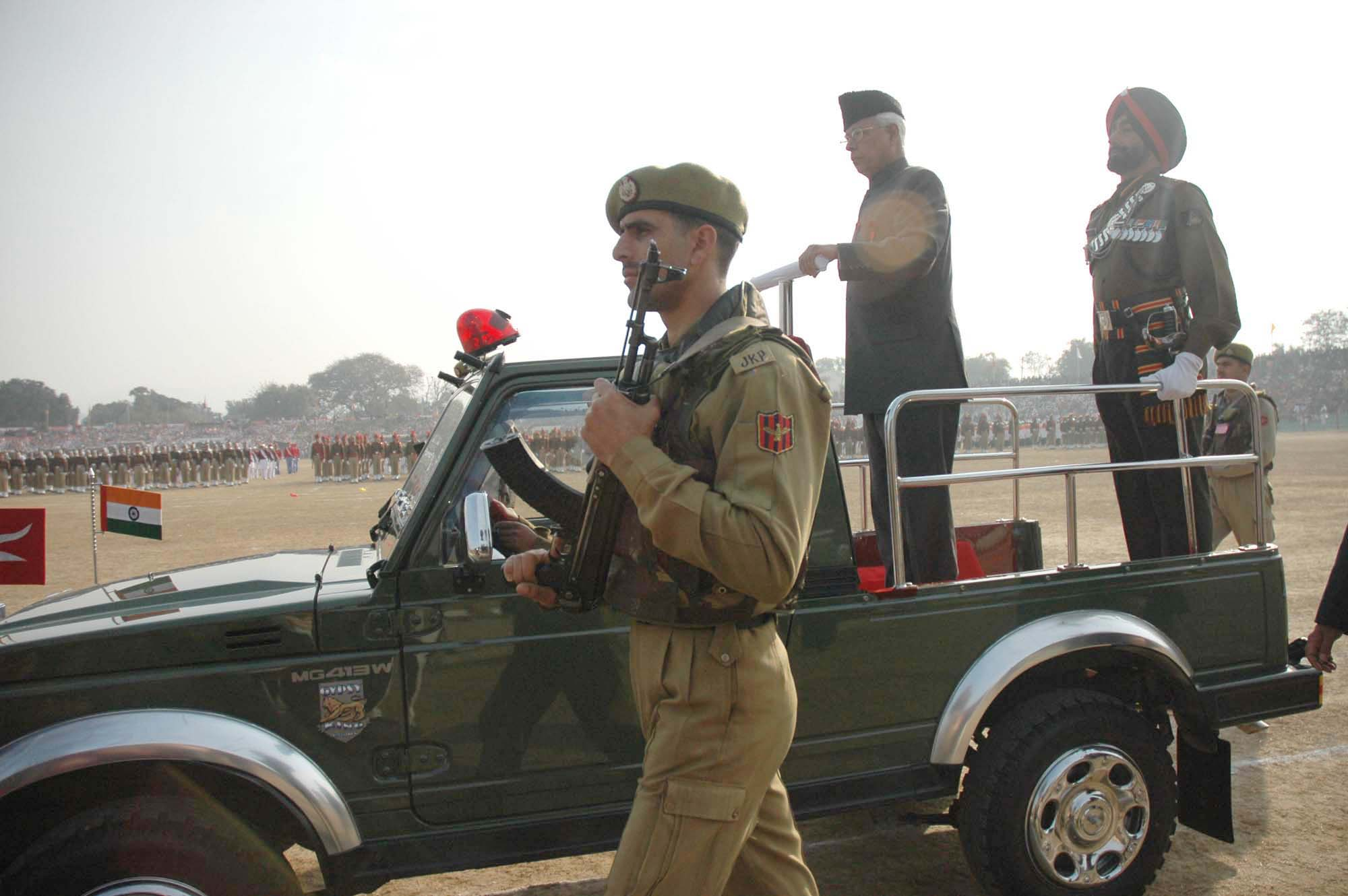
Vohra taking salute from Jammu and Kashmir Police 61st Republic Day of India

Vohra was appointed Governor of Jammu and Kashmir (J&K) by President of India in 2008, his first act as the governor of J&K was to rescind the controversial Amarnath shrine land transfer order.

Vohra was reappointed the governor of Jammu and Kashmir by the president of India in 2013. Vohra retired from the position of governor in August 2018 and was replaced by Satya Pal Malik, a Bharatiya Janata Party politician and a former governor of the state of Bihar.

Vohra ruled Jammu and Kashmir directly four times (governor's rule) during his tenure as governor, with his tenure as state governor being widely seen to be a positive one.

== Awards and recognition ==
- Vohra was conferred the Padma Vibhushan, India's second highest civilian honour, for his contributions to the field of civil service, in 2007.

== Selected bibliography ==
- Vohra, N. N.; Mathews, K. (1997). Africa, India & South-South cooperation. New Delhi: Har-Anand Publications. ISBN 9788124105030.
- —————; Dixit, Jyotindra Nath (1998). Religion, politics, and society in South and Southeast Asia. Delhi: Konark Publishers in association with India International Centre. ISBN 9788122005295.
- ————— (1999). Culture, society, and politics in Central Asia and India. Delhi: SHIPRA Publications India International Centre. ISBN 9788175410404.
- —————; et al. (2000). Issues before the World Trade Organization: India's perspective: report on a seminar held on 20 March, 1999, at the India International Centre. New Delhi: Mosaic Books, in association with India International Centre. ISBN 9788185399515.
- ————— (2001). Culture, democracy, and development in South Asia. New Delhi, India: Shipra Publications. ISBN 9788175410701.
- ————— (2002). India and East Asia: culture and society. Delhi, India: Shipra Publications. ISBN 9788175411067.
- —————; Bhattacharya, Sabyasachi (2002). Looking back, India in the twentieth century. New Delhi: National Book Trust, India in association with India International Centre. ISBN 9788123737508.
- ————— (2003). Emerging Asia: challenges for India and Singapore. New Delhi, India: India International Centre Manohar. ISBN 9788173044847.
- ————— (2003). History, culture, and society in India and West Asia. Delhi, India: Shipra Publications. ISBN 9788175411234.
- ————— (2004). India and Australasia: history, culture, and society. Delhi: Shipra Publications. ISBN 9788175411685.

== See also ==
- Vohra Report
- Governor of Jammu and Kashmir

Political offices
| Preceded by Srinivas Kumar Sinha | Governor of Jammu and Kashmir; 25 June 2008 – 23 August 2018 | Succeeded by Satya Pal Malik |
