= Amar Nath Verma =

Indian bureaucrat

8th Principal Secretary to the Prime Minister of India
- In office 1991–1996
- President: Ramaswamy Venkataraman; Shankar Dayal Sharma
- Prime Minister: P. V. Narasimha Rao
- Preceded by: S. K. Misra
- Succeeded by: T. R. Satish Chandran

Personal details
- Born: Uttar Pradesh, India
- Occupation: IAS officer

Amar Nath Verma, also known as A. N. Verma, is an Indian retired bureaucrat and IAS officer who served sixth Principal Secretary to the Prime Minister of India for P. V. Narasimha Rao from 1991 to 96. Sometimes, he is recognised one of "the most influential bureaucrats" of Rao's government.

== Career ==
Verma is a 1956 batch Indian Administrative Service officer from Uttar Pradesh cadre. He served as industry secretary in the government of India when Rajiv Gandhi took office as the prime minister. Prior to his appointment as principal secretary, he served as secretary for industry to the government of India.

He reportedly played central role in industrial policymaking and implementation of the industrial reforms for union government. He, along with Rakesh Mohan formed the first draft for the industries called the New Industry Policy (NIP) in 1990. The policy was subsequently implemented or adopted by Vishwanath Pratap Singh and Ajit Singh. It was also adopted by Chandra Shekhar in 1991 and Manmohan Singh, in addition to P. V. Narasimha Rao.

After Chandra Shekhar took office as the prime minister, Verma was appointed as the member secretary of the Planning Commission, and later principal secretary to the prime minister. He later became chief enforcer of Rao.
