= Saadiya Kochar =

Indian photographer, artist and writer

Saadiya Kochar is an Indian woman photographer and solo traveller. Her works can be broadly classified into art and social documentary photography, although she dabbles into portraiture, street and fashion as well.

== Early years and education ==
Saadiya was born into a Sikh family. Her birthplace is Jammu, Jammu and Kashmir. Kochar's education was from a missionary school, Convent of Jesus and Mary in Delhi but she never went to a regular college. Having studied mass communication, from Sri Aurobindo Institute of Mass communication she went on to study at Triveni Kala Sangam, under world renowned artist O. P. Sharma, a photographer famous for black and white images. She got a diploma in photography from ICPP, Australia.

== Career ==
When she was 24, this Indian photographer published her first book, Being.....

Kochar, has worked in Kashmir for over a decade, has taught photography at the Pearl Academy of Fashion and is the creative head of astudio, in Delhi. In 2012, she organised a solo show, in New Delhi, of her images from Kashmir, titled Loss. Saadiya has shown her photographs through a few solo shows, earlier as well, titled- Being...( thoughts, emotions and self-discovery displayed through the body), Zikr-the remembrance (Sufi practices) has been a part of a number of group shows, in India as well as abroad. A book on the human form was released in 2004. Kochar has worked on a short video art project called Loss, about the troubles faced by Kashmiri Muslims and the Kashmiri Pandits. She continues to travel and work in Kashmir.

In 2013, she began a blog about her personal journey as a single, female photographer, navigating through the city, archiving her experiences of loss and longing, through photographs and writings A 100 pieces of me-project. In 2017, she travelled through India by herself, covering the Northern, Eastern, Southern and Western Corridors. The project Road Tripping-Photowalli Gaadee is a pan India project that made its debut at the India Art Fair in a group show and at Cafe De Art in a solo one.
