= B. G. Deshmukh =

Former Indian civil servant

B.G. Deshmukh IAS

6th Principal Secretary to the Prime Minister of India
- In office 1989–1990
- Prime Minister: Rajiv Gandhi; V.P. Singh; Chandrashekhar
- Preceded by: Sarla Grewal
- Succeeded by: S. K. Misra

Personal details
- Born: 26 March 1929
- Died: 7 August 2011 (aged 82)

Bhalchandra Gopal Deshmukh, also known as B.G. Deshmukh, IAS (1929–2011) was an Indian civil servant from the 1951 batch of the Indian Administrative Service. During his career he served with distinction in various capacities in Maharashtra and Gujarat. He was secretary to the then chief minister of Maharashtra, Vasantrao Naik, and Commissioner of the Brihanmumbai Municipal Corporation, Bombay. He went on to serve as Additional Secretary, Ministry of Home Affairs, and Union Labour Secretary in the Government of India.

- In 1985, he was appointed as Chief Secretary to the Government of Maharashtra.

B. G. Deshmukh was appointed as the 17th Cabinet Secretary of the Government of India in 1986, taking over from his batchmate P. K. Kaul, IAS (1951 UP).

- In 1989, Rajiv Gandhi appointed him as his principal secretary, a post he went on to hold even under V.P. Singh and briefly under Chandrashekhar.

After his retirement, he served on the Board of several companies including Tata Sons Limited, Tata Housing Development Co. Ltd., Tata Council for Community Initiatives, Tata Institute of Social Sciences, SEBI for Mutual Funds and IDBI Mutual Fund.

He is also associated with social and development organisations such as Bombay Natural History Society, KEM Hospital, National Association for the Blind among others.

Mr. Deshmukh has a number of books to his credit. These include "A Cabinet Secretary thinks aloud", "A Cabinet Secretary looks around" and "Poona to Prime Minister’s Office – A Cabinet Secretary looks back".
