= Shiv Kumar Sarin =

Indian gastroenterologist and hepatologist (born 1952)

- Born: 20 August 1952 (age 73); India
- Occupations: Gastroenterologist, Hepatologist, Chancellor at Institute of Liver and Billiary Sciences, Delhi
- Awards: Padma Bhushan; Shanti Swarup Bhatnagar Prize; TWAS International Prize; G-Files awards Om Prakash Bhasin Award

Shiv Kumar Sarin is an Indian physician; a hepatologist and, gastroenterologist. Under of Delhi Government, he set up the Institute of Liver and Biliary Sciences (ILBS); the largest liver hospital and a deemed Liver University, and a WHO Centre in Vasant Kunj, Delhi. He has received Shanti Swarup Bhatnagar Prize, The World Academy of Science Prize, and Padma Bhushan in 2007. He served as Chairman Board of Governors of Medical Council of India and shaped the New Medical Education Vision, including NEET and NEXT exams. He is a leader in science and served as the President of the Asian Pacific Association for study of Liver and is currently the President of the National Academy of Medical Sciences (NAMS) of India (2021-2024).

== Biography ==
Prof. Shiv Kumar Sarin, Chancellor, Institute of Liver and Biliary Sciences, is an Indian physician; a hepatologist and, gastroenterologist, and public health advocate. He established the Institute of Liver and Biliary Sciences (ILBS) under Delhi Govt., a Liver University in Vasant Kunj, Delhi. Dr. Sarin is currently the President of the National Academy of Medical Sciences (India). He is also serving as an Adjunct Faculty of Molecular Medicine at Jawaharlal Nehru University, Delhi.

== Academic career ==
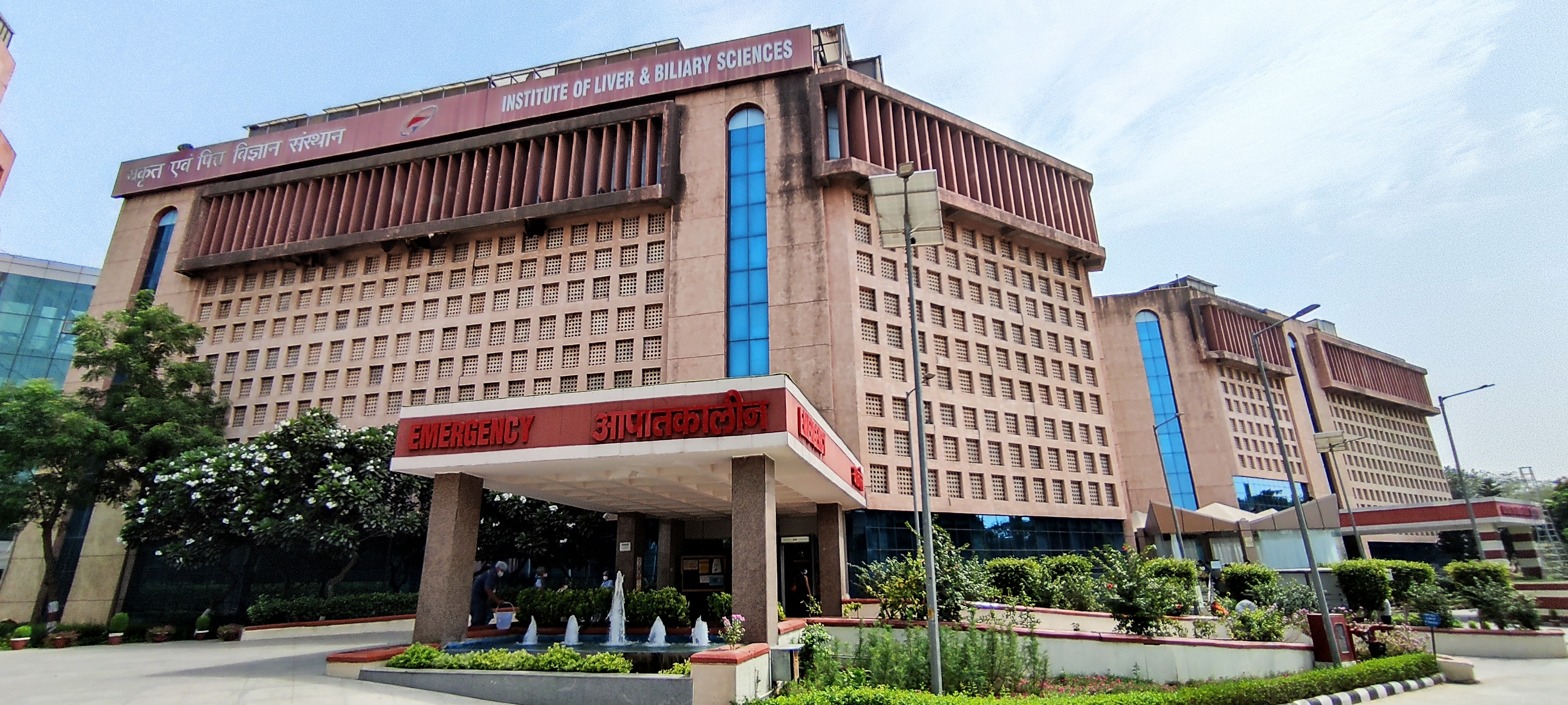
The Institute of Liver & Biliary Sciences, Vasant Kunj

With 7 gold medals in M.B.B.S. and one in L.L.B (law), he continued academic excellence by being a Fogarty Fellow, Japanese SPH Fellow, and Fellow of all science academies in India. His research has enriched the discipline of Liver Diseases with nearly 850 publications, with an H-index of 116, and more than 72,439 citations. His seminal work on band ligation for prevention of variceal bleeding in The NEJM and Sarin’s Classification of Gastric Varices are universally accepted. He described two new disease entities; Acute-on-Chronic Liver Failure and Portal biliopathy. He is credited globally to give a large number of new protocols for the management of liver disease patients. His use of growth factors to stimulate bone marrow for liver regeneration as an alternative to liver transplant opened new treatment vistas. He pioneered fecal microbiota transplantation for alcoholic hepatitis.

He is the founder Chief-editor of Hepatology International, a Springer Nature publication. Dr. Sarin was able to set-up the Asian Pacific School of Hepatology at ILBS since 2012.

Policy Initiatives:

As Chairman of Board of Governors of Medical Council of India (MCI), he introduced seminal reforms in medical education, and scripted ‘Vision 2015’ of Medical Education in India. The ‘National Eligibility cum Entrance Test (NEET)’ and common exit examination (now called NEXT) were his brainchild and are serving well the country. He chaired policy initiatives for Integrating Ayurveda and Modern System of Medicine at Niti Aayog.

He helped and led the GoI in 2021 into Integration of Non-Alcoholic Fatty Liver Disease (NAFLD) within the ambit of NCDs, making India the first country globally (covered by the Lancet, applauded by DG, WHO).

He initiated and guided the launch of the first Universal Hepatitis B vaccination program for newborns in India in Delhi, in 2001. He was instrumental in development of “National Viral Hepatitis Control Program”, implemented by the GoI in 2018. He helped set-up the National Liver Disease Bio-bank with the help of DBT.

Community service:

He championed to generate public awareness on Hepatitis B, by organizing "Yellow Ribbon Campaign" since 1998, observed as Hepatitis Awareness Day by GNCTD for 25 years. In 2013, he also initiated the “Healthy Liver-Healthy India”, a campaign to focus on liver health. Dr. Sarin launched “Empathy” (Empowering People Against Hepatitis), a program to give equal rights to more than 50 million people living with hepatitis [2018]. In 2020-2023 parliamentarians at the Sansad, pledged to eliminate hepatitis B and C from India. Initiated HepiSchool (Hepatitis Initiated School) program [2018-19] for Delhi Govt. schools for protection of children from hepatitis. His “Liv Healthy” mission is core to major health programs [2018] and runs mobile Liver Vans in Delhi. Started SMiLES (Stronger India through a Million Health Educated Students) project for young and healthy India.

Set-up the First Plasma Bank in India for Covid patients at ILBS under the GNCTD. This 24x7 bank, served and issued more than 8,000 plasma units.

== Positions ==
Dr. Sarin is a Senior Professor of Hepatology and Chancellor of ILBS University. He set-up a WHO collaborative center on liver diseases at ILBS and is its Director. He is a former President of the Indian Society of Gastroenterology, Indian National Association for the Study of the Liver, and the Asian Pacific Association for the Study of the Liver (APASL) and is serving as Chairman of the Steering Committee of APASL. He is also the Patron of the APASL-ACLF Research Consortium (AARC), having 26 member countries.

== Awards and honors ==
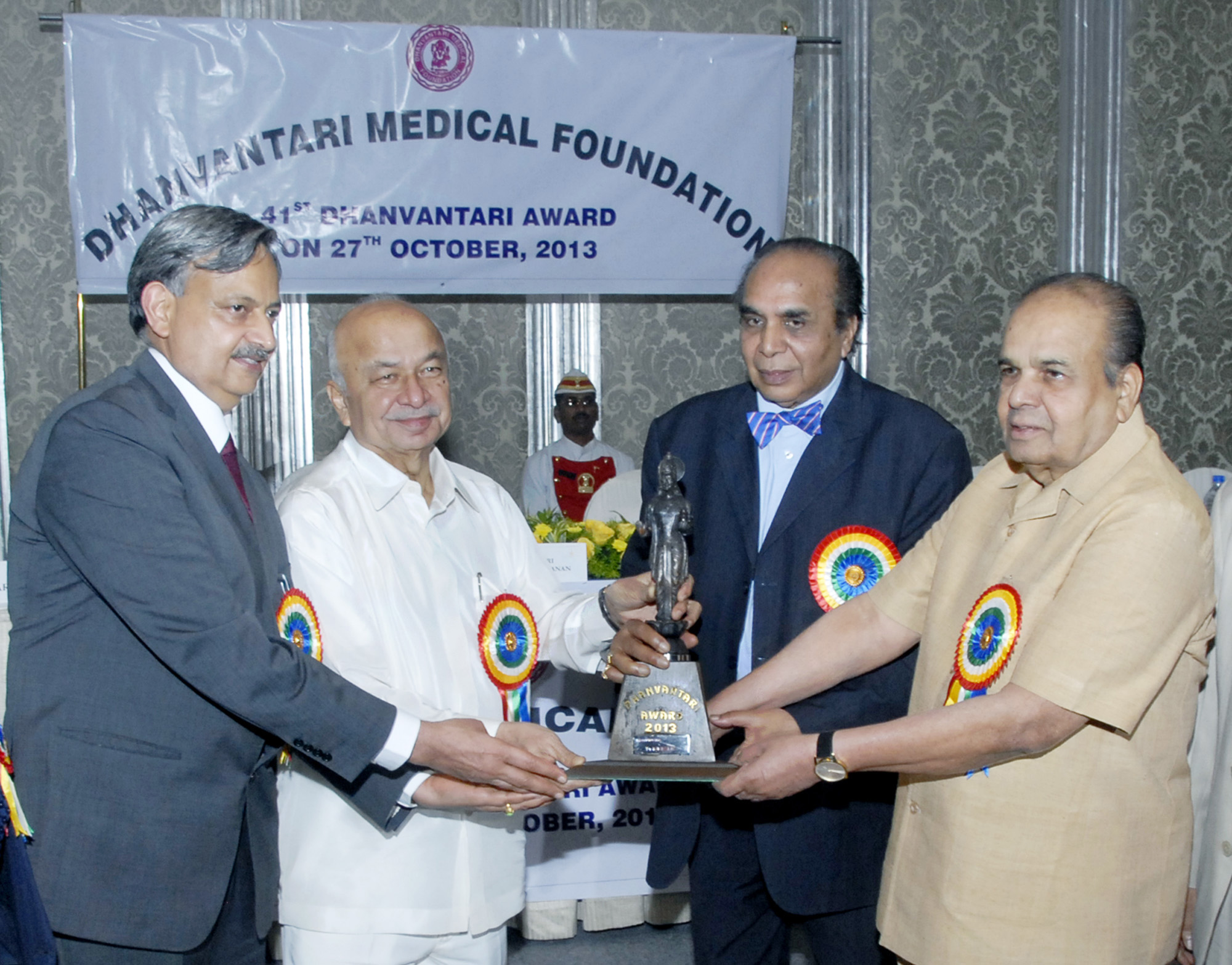
K. Shankarnarayanan, the Union Home Minister, Shri Sushilkumar Shinde and Padmavibhushan Dr. B. K. Goyal felicitated Dr. Shivkumar Sarin by “41th Dhanvantari Award 2013”, organized by Dhanvantari Medical Foundation

Sarin was awarded the Japanese Research Science Award in 1986 and the Hoechst Om Prakash Memorial Award in 1987. He received the Ranbaxy Research Science Award in Medical Sciences in 1994 followed by Shanti Swarup Bhatnagar Prize of the Council of Scientific and Industrial Research (CSIR), the highest Indian award in the science category in 1996. The Association of Physicians of India (API) awarded him the Gifted Teacher Award in 1999 and Amrut Mody Unichem Award of the Indian Council of Medical Research (ICMR) reached him in 2003. He received the TWAS Prize of The World Academy of Sciences in 2004, the Silver Jubilee Award of the Medical Council of India the same year and the FICCI Award of the Federation of Indian Chambers of Commerce and Industry in 2005. The Government of India included him in the Republic Day honours list for the civilian award of the Padma Bhushan in 2007, the same year as he received the Om Prakash Bhasin Award and he received the Mahaveer Award of the Bhagwan Mahaveer Foundation in 2008. He is also a recipient of the Dhanvantri Medical Award, IEDRA Rashtriya Samman Puraskar, Lifetime Achievement Award of the Government of Delhi, Malaysia Liver Foundation Award and Vashisht Chikitsa Ratan Award of the Delhi Medical Association.

Sarin, a 1988 Fogarty Fellow of the National Institutes of Health, had been elected as its Fellow by the National Academy of Sciences, India (NASI) the previous year. He is an elected fellow of several other science or medical academies such as the American College of Gastroenterology (2002), Indian National Science Academy (2004), Indian Academy of Sciences (2005), and National Academy of Medical Sciences (2005). He has delivered several award orations; Dr. Dharamveer Datta Memorial Award Oration and Dr. Kunti and Om Prakash Award Oration of the Indian Council of Medical Research (2004), Netaji Oration by the Association of Physicians of India (2003), Dr. V. R. Khanolkar Oration of the National Academy of Medical Sciences (2004) and Dr. Yellapragada Subba Row Memorial Award Oration of the Indian National Science Academy (2005) are some of the notable ones.
