= Ashok Alexander =

Indian businessman

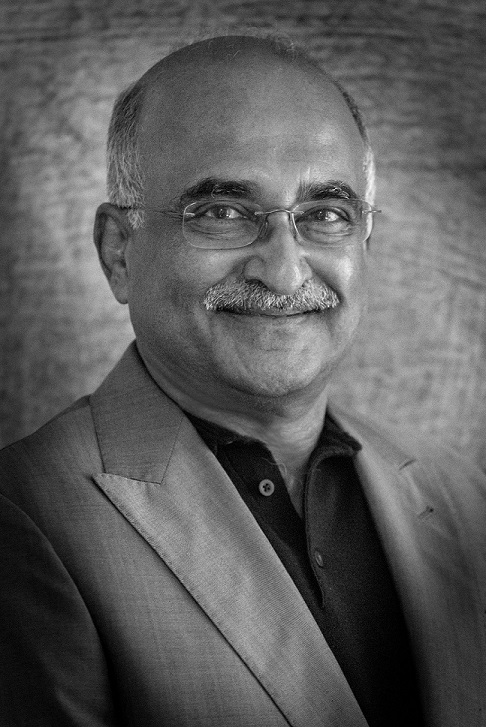
- Born: 5 May 1954 (age 72)
- Education: St. Stephen's College, Delhi; Delhi School of Economics; Delhi University; IIM Ahmedabad
- Occupations: Founder-Director, The Antara Foundation
- Spouse: Anjali Alexander
- Children: 2
- Father: P. C. Alexander

Ashok Alexander is the Founder-Director of The Antara Foundation, a non-profit focused on public health. Prior to establishing Antara Foundation in 2013, Ashok headed the India operations of the Bill & Melinda Gates Foundation. He led the creation and expansion of the Foundation's India office from its inception in 2003 until 2012. There, he created Avahan, India's national AIDS program, which rapidly became the world's largest ever private HIV prevention program.

Before the Gates Foundation, Ashok spent 17 years at McKinsey & Company, and left as Director of the firm's Delhi office. He joined McKinsey in 1986 in New York and was part of a small group that moved to India to establish its highly successful India practice.

Ashok is a graduate of St. Stephen's College, Delhi, a post-graduate from the Delhi School of Economics, and has an MBA from the Indian Institute of Management Ahmedabad. Married and has two sons, his passions are painting in oils and charcoal, and chess in which he has been a US Master. He is a founding board member of the Public Health Foundation of India, served on the board of CARE India, and been a founding trustee of the America-India Foundation.

== Career ==
=== Bill & Melinda Gates Foundation ===
Ashok left McKinsey to lead the Bill and Melinda Gates Foundation's India operations. He led the team that set up Avahan, an initiative aimed at stemming India's growing HIV epidemic. In less than three years, Avahan had become the world's largest-ever privately sponsored HIV prevention program. Avahan worked with groups most at risk to HIV – primarily commercial sex workers. The Lancet in 2013, credited Avahan with preventing over 600,000 HIV infections. Alexander himself has said much of the credit for the reduction in HIV belong to the sex workers themselves.

Ashok's team took the business model behind Avahan to maternal and child health and infectious diseases in Bihar and UP. Over a decade, Ashok led the growth and expansion of the Gates Foundation in India, with grants spanning health, sanitation and agriculture. The grants portfolio he oversaw amounted to over $1 billion involving scores of grantee organizations.

== Bibliography ==
- Ashok Alexander (2018). A Stranger Truth - Lessons in Love, Leadership and courage from India's Sex Workers. Juggernaut Publications. ISBN 978-8193876701.
