= S. K. Misra =

Indian Administrative Service Officer

7th Principal Secretary to the Prime Minister of India
- In office 1990–1991
- Preceded by: B. G. Deshmukh
- Succeeded by: Amar Nath Verma

Personal details
- Born: 1932 (age 93–94) Uttar Pradesh, India
- Occupation: Civil servant
- Awards: Padma Bhushan; G-Files awards

S. K. Misra (born 1932) is a retired Indian civil servant, social worker, writer and a former Principal Secretary to Chandra Sekhar, the 8th Prime Minister of India. He served as the principal secretary to three chief ministers of Haryana and is a former secretary at the ministries of Tourism, Civil Aviation and Agriculture. He is one of the founders of Motilal Nehru School of Sports, Rai and the founder chairman of Indian Trust for Rural Heritage and Development. The Government of India awarded him the third highest civilian honour of the Padma Bhushan, in 2009, for his contributions to Indian civil service.

== Biography ==
Born in the Indian state of Uttar Pradesh in 1932, Misra secured a master's degree from Allahabad University and started his career as a member of faculty at his alma mater before joining the Indian Administrative Service in 1956. His civil service started with a posting at Patiala and East Punjab States Union (PEPSU) and later he moved to Hisar as the Deputy Commissioner. When Bansi Lal became the third chief minister of Haryana in 1968, Misra was appointed as his principal secretary and he held the post till 1975. When he moved to Union Government as the Minister of Defence, Lal took Misra with him to continue as the principal secretary. His second tenure as the principal secretary was with Bhajan Lal who was the chief minister of the state from 1979 to 1985. His association with Bansi Lal continued during the Lal's second term as the chief minister (1985–87) and Chaudhary Devi Lal, who succeeded him as the chief minister also retained Misra as his principal secretary. It was during this period, he contributed to the setting up of Punjab Agricultural University, in Ludhiana and Hisar as well as the National Institute of Fashion Technology. While Misra was holding the post, Chandra Sekhar who became the prime minister of India in 1990, offered him the post as the principal secretary and he superannuated from civil service holding the post.

After his retirement from civil service, Misra had a short spell with the Union Public Service Commission and was later appointed as the director-general of Festival of India, a series of cultural festivals held in France, USA, erstwhile Soviet Union and Japan. Concurrently, he was also associated with Indian National Trust for Art and Cultural Heritage (INTACH), a cultural forum conceptualized by Indira Gandhi and founded by Pupul Jayakar in 1984 and served the organization as its vice chairman for 10 years and as the chairman for the next 6 years. He disassociated with INTACH in 2010 to found a new organization in 2011, under the name, The Indian Trust for Rural Heritage and Development, and the organization is involved in rural development and education; they run a village school at Hariharpur, in the Azamgarh district of Uttar Pradesh, in collaboration with the Lutyens Trust, UK. His contributions have also been reported in the establishment of Motilal Nehru School of Sports, Rai, a co-educational institution under government of Haryana located in Sonipat . The Government of India awarded him the civilian honor of the Padma Bhushan in 2009.

Misra has recorded his experiences during the civil service years in a book, Flying in High Winds, published in 2016, which has details of his tenure as the principal secretary at the state and the centre as well as has his meetings with such notable people as Jawaharlal Nehru, M. F. Hussain, Prince Charles, Sanjay Gandhi and Ebrahim Alkazi.

== See also ==
- Motilal Nehru School of Sports, Rai
- Indian National Trust for Art and Cultural Heritage
