= Hans Raj Mahila Maha Vidyalaya =

Coordinates: 31.3256°N 75.5792°E

Hans Raj Mahila Maha Vidyalaya is a college in Jalandhar, Punjab. The college was founded by Mahatma Hansraj Mahila in 1927 in Lahore, Pakistan. After the partition of India and Pakistan the school moved to Jalandhar in 1948. The first class consisted of about 80 students compared to 4,650 students in the current class.

The college is managed by the D.A.V. College Managing Committee (DAVMC).currently principal of college is Mrs. Ajay sareen.

== Notable alumni ==
- Sarla Grewal, first woman president of Tribune Trust
- Mrs. Chanchal, first deputy director of Sports of Punjab
- Gurveen Sidhu, deputy director of National Academy of Audits and Accounts
- J Kakria, ex-principal of HRMMV
- Sarita Verma, principal of B. D. Arya College in Jalandhar
- Usha Kapoor, principal of GND University in Jalandhar
- Neelam Sethi, principal of S. D. College in Gurdaspur
- Sumita Dawra, IAS Officer
- Sarla Bhardwaj, National Sanskrit Literary Award recipient
- Rachna Puri
- Sunita Rani, Arjuna Award and Padma Shree Award recipient
- Surbhi Jyoti, television, Punjabi movie and theatre actress best known for Raula Pai Gaya and Qubool Hai
- Lieutenant Nandita Bhardwaj, Platoon Contingent Commander of the first women contingent of Navy on Republic Day Parade 2015
- Nalini Priyadarshni, poet and writer
- Beenu Rajpoot, Documentary Filmmaker, Delhi
- hmv college jalandhar

== Awards ==
- First prize in Zonal Youth Festival at GND University in Amritsar
- GND University Sports Championship (22 years consecutive)

The college also has status of Star College conferred by, Government of India. The college is also recognized by UGC as a "College of Excellence." The college has the unique distinction of having been re-accredited with grade A scoring 3.83 (Highest score in India amongst Women Colleges) out of 4 in NAAC accreditation.
