= O. P. Sharma (photographer) =

Indian photographer

- Born: 20 November 1937; Agra, British Raj
- Died: 6 November 2026 (aged 88)
- Occupation: Photographer
- Known for: World Photography Day

O. P. Sharma (born 1937) is an Indian photographer based in Delhi. He heads the photography department of Triveni Kala Sangam. Earlier, he taught photography at Modern School for many years. His works have been widely exhibited in India as well as other countries. He is the recipient of many awards and honours, and is credited with mobilising the international photography community to observe 19 August as World Photography Day.

== Early life ==
O. P. Sharma was born in 1937 in Agra, British India, and grew up in the city. He studied at Christian College, Lucknow, and obtained a Bachelor's degree in science from Lucknow University. It was in Lucknow that he discovered his calling as a photographer. The head of the department of Physics, Lucknow University, placed the darkroom at his disposal. Sharma taught himself how to obtain a print that was a perfect replica of the negative. From that time onwards, he has always done all his darkroom work himself.

== Career ==
Sharma moved to Delhi in 1958 and began his career as photography teacher in Modern School. In 1980 he started teaching at Triveni Kala Sangam (TKS), where he continues to take photography classes three times a week. Both at Modern and at TKS he trained many students who went on to become professional photographers. Some of them, such as Saadiya Kochar and Vicky Roy, have themselves achieved eminence. A short film has been made to commemorate the completion of 40 years of photography at TKS.

At Modern School, Sharma met many well-known people whom he persuaded to pose for studio portraits. Some of the people whose portraits he captured were Begum Akhtar, Pandit Jasraj, Faiz Ahmed Faiz, K. M. Cariappa and Rajiv Gandhi.

During the 1970s, Sharma also worked with the Hindi film industry. He did the still photography for a number of films including Chhupa Rustam, Do Boond Pani, Siddhartha and Shalimar.

== World Photography Day ==
The idea of a day (World Photography Day) that commemorated the birth of photography first occurred to Sharma in 1988. As he says in an interview: "... in various publications that documented the history of photography, I came across this date: 19 August 1839. It was recorded as the date on which the then French government announced the invention of the 'Daguerreotype' process of photography as a ‘free gift to the world'."

Sharma set up about propagating the idea within the photography community in India and abroad. The first observance of the day was in 1991, by the Indian International Photographic Council, founded by Sharma himself. Subsequently, Sharma was able to persuade the Photographic Society of America and the Royal Photographic Society of Great Britain to join in. By now, the observance of 19 August as World Photography Day is worldwide.

== Books authored by O. P. Sharma ==
- Practical Photography, by O. P. Sharma, Full Circle, 2003. ISBN 9788121600309.
- Vision from the Inner Eye: The Photographic Art of A. L. Syed, by O. P. Sharma, Mapin Publishing, 2006. ISBN 9781890206284.

== Awards and honours ==
- Honorary Fellow, Royal Photographic Society of Great Britain, 2000
- Photographic Society of America:
  - Fellow 1991
  - Honorary Fellow 1994

Sharma's works at exhibitions and competitions have fetched him around six hundred awards.
