= Badraon Tiwariyan =

Village in Madhya Pradesh, India

- Village
- Location in Madhya Pradesh, India Badraon Tiwariyan (India)
- Coordinates: 24.83405°N 81.38865°E
- Country: India
- State: Madhya Pradesh
- District: Rewa
- Elevation: 291 m (955 ft)

Population (2011)
  - Total: 877

Languages
  - Official: Hindi
- Time zone: UTC+5:30 (IST)
- Postal code: 486448
- ISO 3166 code: IN-MP
- Vehicle registration: MP

Badaraotiwariyan is a village of Sirmor tehsil (Janpad) in Rewa of Madhya Pradesh in India. It is located 33 km north of Rewa, 11 km from Sirmour, and 509 km from Bhopal. The village postal head office in Sirmour. Nearby villages include Badarao Gautaman, Dol, Umari, Belwa Sursari Singh, and Mahari. Gangev Tehsil, Jawa Tehsil, Raipur Karchuliyan Tehsil, and Rewa Tehsil are all surrounding the village.

== Demographics ==
As of 2011 India census, a total population of 877 people, with 424 males and 453 females (51.7%) with 237 houses. The village has a literacy rate of 68.2% and a female literacy rate of 31.2% a total of 598 literates. The population was divided into 152 scheduled tribes. The survey also included 470 workers and 407 non-workers.

== Transport ==
By train Dabhaura Railway Station is 50 km from Badraon Tiwariyan village

By air

Nearest airport in Prayagraj, Uttar Pradesh.

By bus

Bus stand available in the city bus stand Sirmaur.

== See also ==
- Sirmour (Vidhan Sabha constituency)
