= Arup Roy Choudhury =

Indian businessman

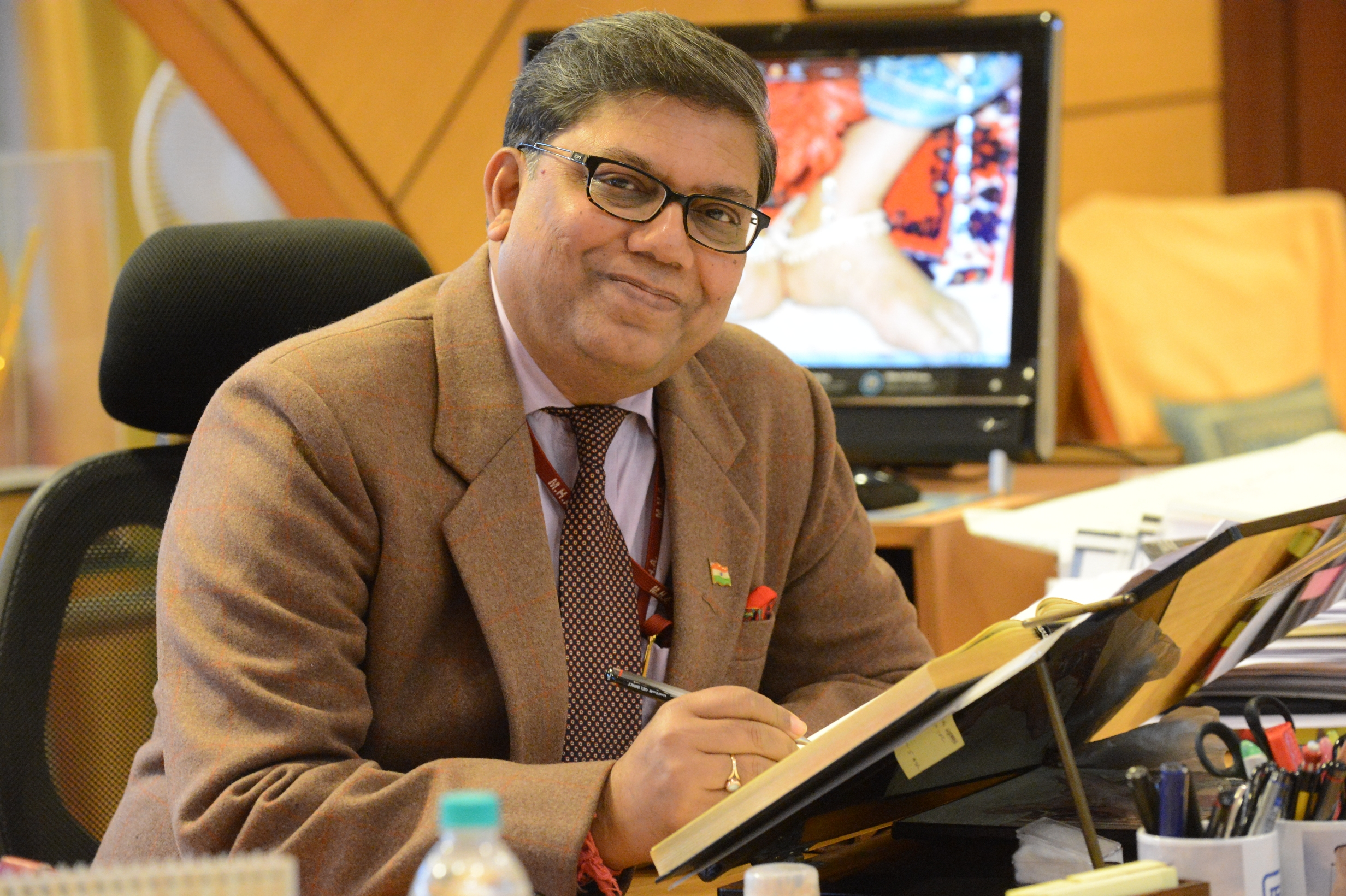

Professor of Practice, Indian Institute of Technology, Delhi
- In office 28 January 2021 - present

Personal details
- Born: 29 December 1956 (age 69)
- Education: BIT (Mesra); IIT Delhi

Arup Roy Choudhury (born 29 December 1956) is an Indian business executive and professor. He worked as the Chairman & MD of NBCC (National Building Construction Corporation), a Navaratna Central Public Sector Company from 3 April 2001 to 31 August 2010, and as Chairman and MD of NTPC (National Thermal Power Corporation), a Maharatna Central Public Sector Company from 1 September 2010 to 31 August 2015.

He also held an additional charge of Chairman of DVC (Damodar Valley Corporation), a Company owned by Govt. of India, Govt. of West Bengal, and Govt. of Jharkhand. From 6 October 2015 till 15 December 2020 he worked with the Govt. of West Bengal, initially as the Chief Commissioner of West Bengal Right to Public Service Commission, and thereafter as the Principal Advisor Infrastructure to the West Bengal Cabinet. Since 28 January 2021, he has joined as Professor of Practice with the Indian Institute of Technology, Delhi.

Choudhury holds a Bachelor's degree in Civil Engineering with a Post graduation in Management & Systems. He has a Ph. D from IIT Delhi in Project Management, with a special emphasis in Dispute Resolution.

Choudhury's ancestors came to Patna in Bihar in the 1920s. His paternal grandfather belonged to the landowning (Zamindar) class of Taki in today's West Bengal and had to leave home under adverse family circumstances due to sudden death of his father. Choudhury's father was a member of the Bihar Government. His mother came from the Zamindar family of Bagerhat in Khulna, in present-day Bangladesh.

== Career ==
Choudhury was appointed chairman of the National Buildings Construction Corporation Limited (NBCC) at the age of 44, making him the youngest CEO ever of a public sector enterprise. He was the corporation's chairman until 2010, and during his time in office, NBCC's turnover and net-worth grew significantly.

In September, 2010, Choudhury became the chairman and managing director of NTPC Limited, the 10th largest power producer in the world. NTPC is also one of the seven largest Central Public Sector Undertakings of India, designated as a Maharatna.

Choudhury was the Chairman of Standing Conference of Public Enterprises (SCOPE), a forum of over 200 Central Public Sector Enterprises (CPSEs) in India from April 2009 to March 2013. He was ranked as number 40 on a list of "India Inc's 100 Most Powerful CEOs 2013", compiled by The Economic Times.

Choudhury has written the books Management by Idiots and Delhi's New Moti Bagh.

== Awards and honors ==
- SCOPE Excellence Award Gold Trophy in individual category 2008–09 as the Best Individual Leader of a Public Sector Enterprise by Prime Minister Dr. Manmohan Singh on 15 December 2010
- The best organizational turnaround from Hon. President of India in 2006 for leadership as CMD NBCC.
- Awarded as CMD, the Gold Trophy for NTPC for best performance, from Hon'ble Prime Minister of India in January 2012.
- Top Ten PSU and Turnaround Award from Hon. Prime Minister of India in 200714.
- Top Ten Central Public Sector Undertaking Award from Hon. Prime Minister of India in 2009 as CMD, NBCC.
- SCOPE Meritorious Award 2010–11 for Corporate Social Responsibility & Responsiveness by HE President of India Smt. Pratibha Patil on 13 April 2012.
- Indira Gandhi Rajbhasha Award from HE President of India Shri Pranab Mukherjee in the presence of Shri Sushilkumar Shinde, Union Home Minister on 14.09.2012.

Individual Awards & Recognitions

- "Best Chief Executive Gold Award" of Public Sector for his outstanding contribution in bringing a remarkable turnaround in the performance of NBCC in November 2005.
- Conferred the title of Business Leader in the Power Sector at the NDTV Business Leadership Awards in April '13.
- At #40 (2nd among CEOs from PSUs) in a prestigious survey by The Economic Times for the year 2013 for making a list of 100 most powerful CEOs in India, and #52 for the year 2012.
- Eminent Engineering Personality Award by Institution of Engineers (I) on 14.12.2012 for remarkable and valuable contribution in the field of engineering, particularly in the civil engineering and construction sector, both nationally and internationally.
- "Outstanding Engineers Award" in recognition of unfailing commitment to Excellence in Project Management by The Institution of Engineering and Technology (U.K.) Delhi Network on 30.10.2012 at New Delhi.
- "Asian CEO of the Year 2012" award by Terrapinn, a business media company with a presence on five continents doing significant work in Energy dialogue, in their "3rd Annual Asian Utility Industry Awards 2012" Night at "Power and Electricity World Asia" conference at Singapore on 17 April 2012.
- Exemplary Leadership Award for People Excellence, awarded for outstanding contribution to the fraternity and sector at the Global HR Excellence Awards under the aegis of World HRD Congress.
- Rotary Vocational Excellence Award 2008–09 for achieving excellence in the profession and making a significant contribution to society.
- Best Technocrat award by Creative Foundation in December 2005.
