= P. C. Alexander =

Indian diplomat and politician

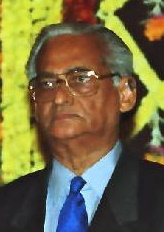

Governor of Maharashtra
- In office 12 January 1993 – 13 July 2002
- Chief Minister: Manohar Gajanan Joshi; Narayan Tatu Rane; Vilasrao Deshmukh
- Preceded by: C Subramaniam
- Succeeded by: Mohammed Fazal

Governor of Tamil Nadu
- In office 17 February 1988 – 24 May 1990
- Preceded by: Sundar Lal Khurana
- Succeeded by: Sardar Surjit Singh Barnala

Governor of Goa
- In office 19 July 1996 – 15 January 1998
- Preceded by: Romesh Bhandari
- Succeeded by: T. R. Satish Chandran

Personal details
- Born: 20 March 1921 Mavelikara, Travancore, British India
- Died: 10 August 2011 (aged 90) Chennai, Tamil Nadu, India
- Education: University of Kerala; Annamalai University
- Profession: Retired IAS officer Politician

Padinjarethalakal Cherian Alexander (20 March 1921 – 10 August 2011) was an Indian Administrative Service officer of 1948 batch who served as the Governor of Tamil Nadu from 1988 to 1990 and as the Governor of Maharashtra from 1993 to 2002. He was considered as a candidate for the post of the President of India in 2002. During his time in Maharashtra, he had additional charge of Goa from 1996 to 1998. He was also a member of the Rajya Sabha representing Maharashtra as an independent candidate from 29 July 2002 to 2 April 2008.

His career included extended stints with the United Nations and India's Ministry of Commerce and his high-profile appointment as the powerful Principal Secretary to the Prime Minister of India during his years with Indira Gandhi. He also served as the Indian High Commissioner to the Court of St. James's.

His autobiography is Through the Corridors of Power. His other works include My years with Indira Gandhi, The Perils of Democracy, and India in the New Millennium.

== Family history, early life and background ==
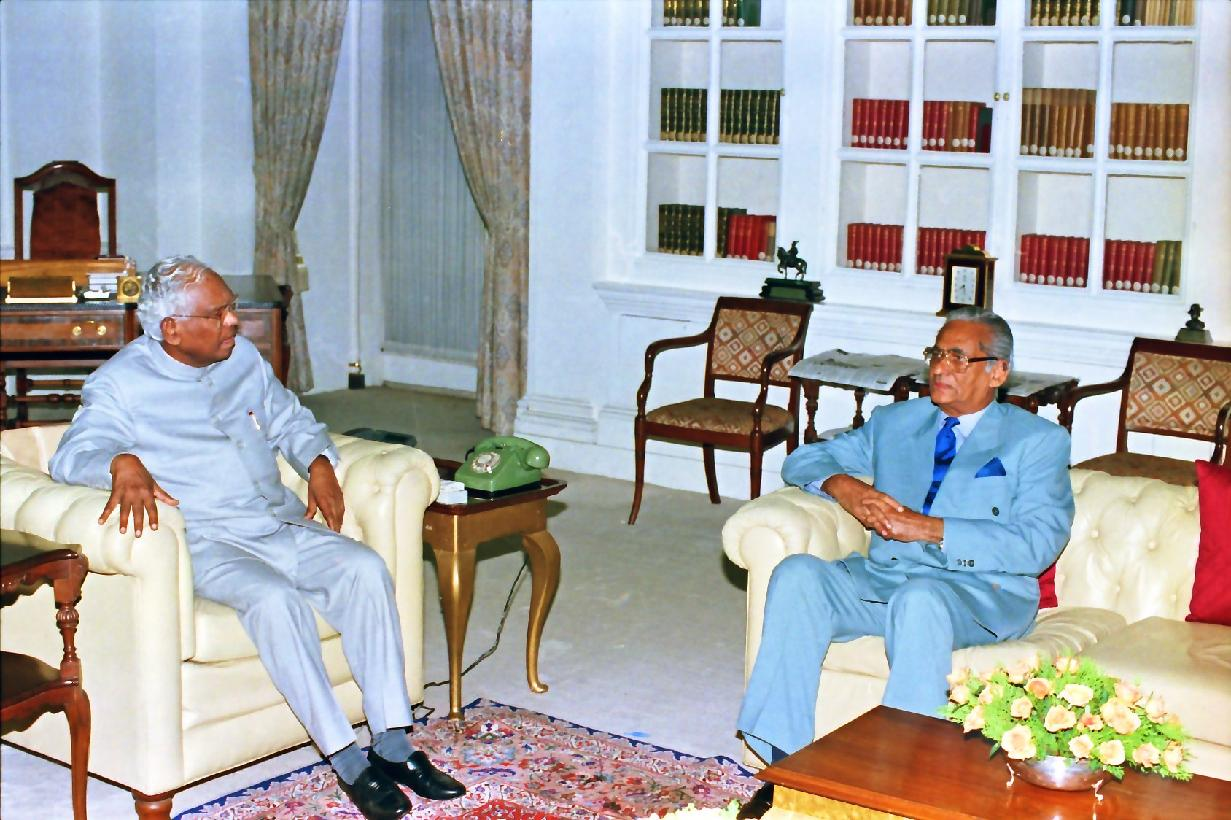
The Governor of Maharashtra, Shri P. C. Alexander calling on the President of India, Shri K. R. Narayanan at Rashtrapati Bhavan

P. C. Alexander was born to a prominent Malankara Orthodox Christian Padinjarethalakal family on 20 March 1921 to P. J. Cherian and Mariamma. He studied at Bishop Hodges Higher Secondary School, and gained his post-graduate degree in History and Economics from the University of Travancore (now University of Kerala). During this period he also remained President, Travancore University Students Union.

== Career ==
Alexander started his career as a civil servant in 1949, entering the IAS on 15 October of that year as an emergency recruited officer. He held several high positions during his career, and also involved himself in public life. Alexander was the principal secretary to Indira Gandhi and virtually served as her shadow and policy adviser for the years after her return to power in January 1980.

On 18 January 1985, he resigned as the principal secretary to the Prime Minister Rajiv Gandhi owing to the Coomar Narain spy scandal wherein his private secretary TN Kher, personal assistant Malhotra among others was implicated as supplying top secret defense and security documents to Coomar Narain who was a Bombay-based businessman with the Maneklal group of industries which was involved in government military contracts. Coomar Narain's sources were tactically placed within various Indian government agencies and was unveiled when the Intelligence Bureau started the surveillance of numerous civil servants and diplomats. Narain supplied sensitive information which included India's defense and internal security documents to major superpowers like France and the Soviet Union which were the major defense suppliers to India.

He was sent as India's High Commissioner of India to the United Kingdom (1985-1987).

He was considered a potential candidate for the 2002 presidential elections. His candidacy was opposed by the Congress party. However, Abdul Kalam was chosen instead. He was also a member of the Rajya Sabha representing Maharashtra as an independent candidate from 29 July 2002 to 2 April 2008.

== Illness and death ==
Alexander died at the Madras Medical Mission hospital in Chennai at the age of 90. He was undergoing treatment for cancer. His dead body was taken to his native land, and was buried there with full state honours.

== Personal life ==
He was married to Akkamma Alexander, and had two sons and two daughters. His son, Jawahar Alexander was named after Jawaharlal Nehru. His other son, Ashok Alexander is the Founder-Director of The Antara Foundation, a non-profit focused on public health.

== Bibliography ==
- My Years with Indira Gandhi by P. C. Alexander, Orient Paperbacks, ISBN 978-81-709408-7-6
