= Chairperson of the Union Public Service Commission =

Head of the Union Public Service Commission

- Flag of India

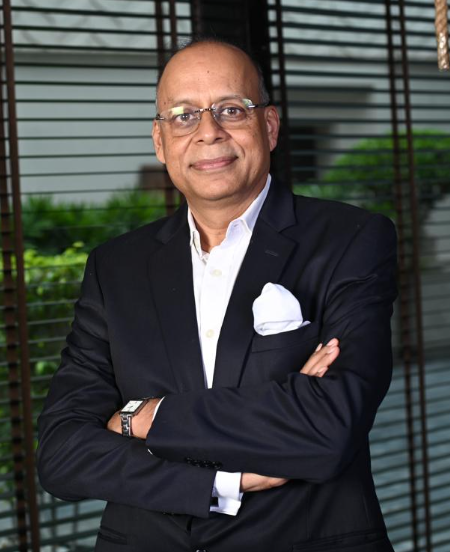
- Incumbent; Ajay Kumar, IAS since 15 May 2025
- Union Public Service Commission
- Status: Head of the commission
- Member of: Union Public Service Commission
- Reports to: The president
- Seat: Dholpur House, New Delhi
- Appointer: The president
- Term length: 6 years or until the age of 65 years; (whichever is earlier)
- Constituting instrument: Part XIV of the Constitution of India
- Formation: 1 October 1926; 100 years ago
- First holder: Ross Barker
- Salary: ₹250,000 (US$2,600) per month under pay level 18
- Website: upsc.gov.in

The Chairperson of the Union Public Service Commission is the head of the Union Public Service Commission (UPSC), a constitutional body. The chairperson is responsible for overseeing the conduct of exams, the transfer and promotion of higher officers and civil servants. The chairperson reports directly to the president of India.

== Background ==
=== Term of office ===
The term for the UPSC chairperson is fixed up to six years or until reaching the age of 65, whichever is earlier. Under Article 316 of the Indian Constitution, the president appoints the members of the UPSC, including the chairperson. The chairperson's tenure is term-limited and ineligible for re-appointment as per Article 319.

=== Qualification of office ===
The chairperson of the UPSC must be a senior civil officer from All India Services or Central Civil Services, who has held positions under the Government of India or any state government for at least ten years. Any academician or a senior military officer can also be appointed as UPSC chairperson if served as a member of the commission itself. The chairperson or members of any state public service commissions can also be appointed as the chairperson.

== Dismissals ==
The chairperson can be removed under Article 317, by order of the president on the ground of "misbehavior" after the Supreme Court, on a reference being made to it by the president, has, on inquiry reported that the chairman or such other member ought to be removed. The president may also remove the chairperson of the commission for:

- being declared insolvent; or
- engaging in any paid employment outside during their term of office ; or
- being unfit to continue in office because of infirmity of mind or body.

== Responsibilities ==
The chairperson, along with other members of the UPSC, manages the recruitment of officers of All India Services and Central Civil Services, the transfer and promotion of higher officers, and deputation from one state to another. The chairperson's duties and service fall under the Union Public Service Commission (Members) Regulations, 1969. Upon the advice of the UPSC members, the tenure of any officer posted in a state or the union can be extended beyond the age of 60 years.

== List of the chairpersons ==
List of the chairpersons of the Union Public Service Commission since 1947
Chairpersons	Service or profession	Tenure start	Tenure end	Duration of office	Previous post	Appointed by
H. K. Kripalani	ICS	1 April 1947	13 January 1949	1 year, 287 days	Chief Secretary of Bombay Province	Louis Mountbatten
R. N. Banerjee	ICS	14 January 1949	9 May 1955	6 years, 115 days	Home Secretary of India	C. Rajagopalachari
N. Govindarajan	ICS	10 May 1955	9 December 1955	213 days	—	Rajendra Prasad
V. S. Hejmadi	ICS	10 December 1955	9 December 1961	5 years, 364 days	—	Rajendra Prasad
B. N. Jha	ICS	11 December 1961	22 February 1967	5 years, 73 days	Cabinet Secretary of India	Rajendra Prasad
K. R. Damle	ICS	18 April 1967	2 March 1971	3 years, 318 days	Secretary to the Ministry of Food and Agriculture, Government of India	Sarvapalli Radhakrishnan
R. C. S. Sarkar	IAS‍–‍WB	11 May 1971	1 February 1973	1 year, 266 days	Secretary to the Ministry of Law and Justice, Government of India	V. V. Giri
A. R. Kidwai	Academician	5 February 1973	4 February 1979	5 years, 364 days	Professor at Aligarh Muslim University	V. V. Giri
M. L. Shahare	—	16 February 1979	16 February 1985	6 years, 0 days	—	Neelam Sanjiva Reddy
H. K. L. Kapoor	IAS‍–‍GJ	18 February 1985	5 March 1990	5 years, 17 days	Chief Secretary of the Government of Gujarat	Zail Singh
J. P. Gupta	IRSME	5 March 1990	2 June 1992	89 days	Chairperson of the Railway Board	Ramaswamy Venkataraman
R. M. Bathew (Kharbuli)	IAS‍–‍ML	23 September 1992	23 August 1996	3 years, 335 days	Member of the Meghalaya Public Service Commission	Shankar Dayal Sharma
S. J. S. Chhatwal	IFS	23 August 1996	30 September 1996	38 days	High Commissioner of India to Canada	Shankar Dayal Sharma
J. M. Qureshi	IPS‍–‍MP	30 September 1996	11 December 1998	72 days	Director general of the Madhya Pradesh Police	Shankar Dayal Sharma
Lt. Gen Surinder Nath	Army‍–‍Regiment of Artillery	11 December 1998	25 June 2002	3 years, 196 days	Vice Chief of the Army Staff	K. R. Narayanan
P. C. Hota	IAS‍–‍OD	25 June 2002	8 September 2003	1 year, 75 days	Additional Secretary to the Ministry of Labour, Government of India	K. R. Narayanan
Mata Prasad	IAS‍–‍UP	9 September 2003	4 January 2005	1 year, 118 days	Secretary to the Ministry of Water Resources, Government of India	A. P. J. Abdul Kalam
S. R. Hashim	Academician	4 January 2005	1 April 2006	1 year, 87 days	Ambassador of India to Kazakhstan	A. P. J. Abdul Kalam
Gurbachan Jagat	IPS‍–‍AGMUT	1 April 2006	30 June 2007	1 year, 90 days	Director General of Border Security Force	A. P. J. Abdul Kalam
Subir Dutta	IAS‍–‍WB	30 June 2007	16 August 2008	1 year, 47 days	Defence Secretary of India	A. P. J. Abdul Kalam
D. P. Agrawal	Academician	16 August 2008	16 August 2014	6 years, 0 days	Director of Indian Institute of Information Technology and Management, Gwalior	Pratibha Patil
Rajni Razdan	IAS‍–‍HR	16 August 2014	21 November 2014	97 days	Secretary to the Department of Administrative Reforms and Public Grievances, Government of India	Pranab Mukherjee
Deepak Gupta	IAS‍–‍JH	22 November 2014	20 September 2016	1 year, 303 days	Secretary to the Ministry of New and Renewable Energy, Government of India	Pranab Mukherjee
Alka Sirohi	IAS‍–‍MP	21 September 2016	3 January 2017	103 days	Secretary to the Department of Personnel and Training, Government of India	Pranab Mukherjee
David R. Syiemlieh	Academician	4 January 2017	21 January 2018	1 year, 17 days	Vice-Chancellor of Rajiv Gandhi University, Arunachal Pradesh	Pranab Mukherjee
Vinay Mittal	IRTS	22 January 2018	19 June 2018	148 days	Chairperson of the Railway Board	Ram Nath Kovind
Arvind Saxena	IPoS	20 June 2018 (acting)	6 August 2020	2 years, 47 days	Special Secretary for the Aviation Research Centre	Ram Nath Kovind
Arvind Saxena	IPoS	28 November 2018 (permanent)	6 August 2020	2 years, 47 days	Special Secretary for the Aviation Research Centre	Ram Nath Kovind
P. K. Joshi	Academician	7 August 2020	4 April 2022	1 year, 240 days	Chairperson of the Chhattisgarh Public Service Commission	Ram Nath Kovind
Manoj Soni	Academician	5 April 2022 (acting)	31 July 2024	2 years, 117 days	Vice-chancellor of Dr. Babasaheb Ambedkar Open University	Ram Nath Kovind
Manoj Soni	Academician	16 May 2023 (permanent)	31 July 2024	2 years, 117 days	Vice-chancellor of Dr. Babasaheb Ambedkar Open University	Droupadi Murmu
Preeti Sudan	IAS‍–‍AP	1 August 2024	29 April 2025	271 days	Secretary to the Ministry of Health, Government of India	Droupadi Murmu
Ajay Kumar	IAS‍–‍KL	15 May 2025	Incumbent	1 year, 139 days	Defence Secretary of India	Droupadi Murmu
