= S. R. Hashim (economist) =

Indian economist

Saiyed Raza Hashim
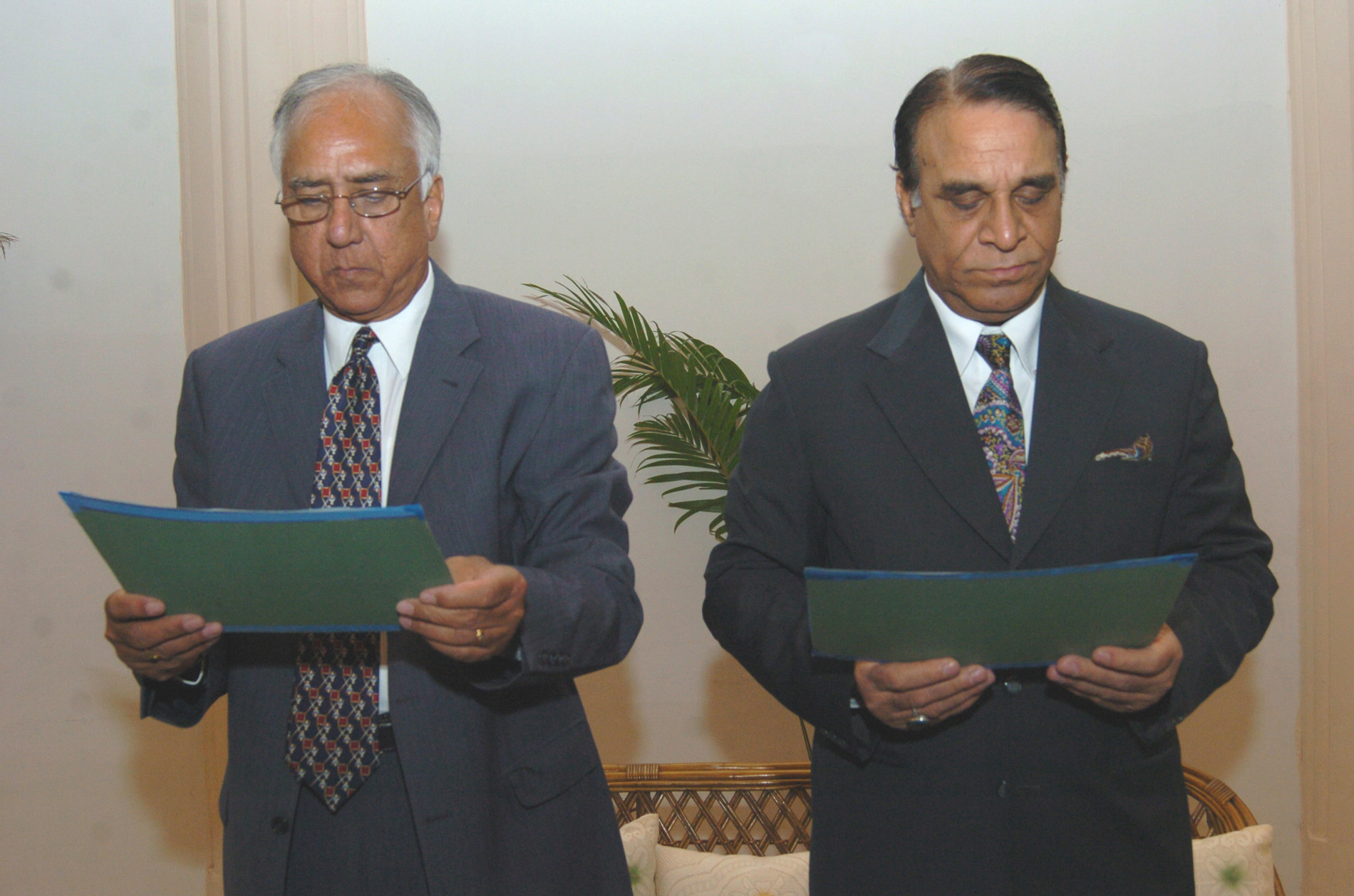
- Dr. S. R. Hashim (right) administers the oath to Gurbachan Jagat (left), New Delhi.

Ambassador of India to the Kazakhstan
- In office 1999–2002
- Appointed by: Atal Bihari Vajpayee

Chairman of the Union Public Service Commission
- In office 4 January 2005 – 1 April 2006
- Appointed by: A. P. J. Abdul Kalam
- Preceded by: Mata Prasad
- Succeeded by: Gurbachan Jagat

Personal details
- Born: 1941 (age 84–85)
- Education: M.A. Economics, Ph.D
- Alma mater: University of Lucknow, Pune University

Saiyed Raza Hashim, commonly known as S. R. Hashim, is an Indian economist, academic and diplomat.

== Early life and education ==
Hashim was born in 1941. He studied at the University of Lucknow for graduation and post graduation. He later completed doctorate from Gokhale Institute of Politics and Economics, then affiliated with the University of Poona, where he received a Ph.D. He also studied at the University College of Wales, Aberystwyth.

== Academic career ==
Hashim began his academic career as an economist and teacher. He served as Professor and Head of the Department of Economics at Maharaja Sayajirao University of Baroda from 1978 to 1986.He was associated with several major economic research institutions in India. He served as Director of the Institute of Economic Growth and later as Director of the Institute for Studies in Industrial Development. He also remained associated with the latter institution as a researcher and faculty member.His early research focused on industrial economics, particularly the measurement of capital stock and capital-output relations in Indian industries. His work, including Capital-Output Relations in Indian Industries, contributed to the study of industrial investment and productivity in India.

== Career in government and public service ==
Hashim joined the Planning Commission of India in 1986. During his tenure, which continued until 2000, he served in several senior positions, including Adviser, Principal Adviser, Member and Member-Secretary. From 2000 to 2002, he served as Ambassador of India to Kazakhstan.Hashim was appointed a Member of the Union Public Service Commission in 2002. He later served as Chairman of the Union Public Service Commission from 2002 to 2006.
