= Hota (disambiguation) =

Hota refers to the seeds of the plant Canna indica.

Hota may also refer to:

== People ==
- Almedin Hota, a Bosnian former professional footballer
- Damodar Hota, an Indian classical musician
- Purna Chandra Hota, an Indian bureaucrat and chairman of the Union Public Service Commission
- Reela Hota, an Indian Odissi dancer and arts promoter

== Other uses ==
- Home of the Arts, Gold Coast, a cultural precinct in Queensland, Australia
- Home Office Type Approval, a testing and approval process for speed cameras in the United Kingdom
- Hota, Japan, one of the settlements that merged to form Kyonan, Chiba Prefecture, Japan
- Hota Station (Chiba), a railway station in Kyonan, Chiba Prefecture, Japan
- Hota Station (Fukui), a railway station in Katsuyama, Fukui Prefecture, Japan.

== See also ==
- HOTAS
