= Preeti Sudan =

Indian bureaucrat

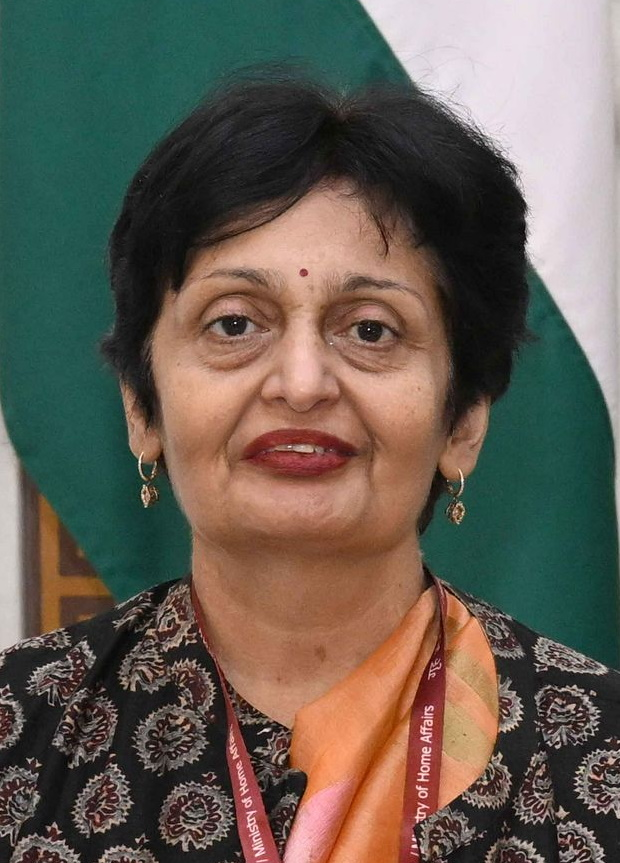

Chairperson of the Union Public Service Commission
- In office 1 August 2024 – 29 April 2025
- Appointed by: Appointments Committee of the Cabinet
- Preceded by: Manoj Soni
- Succeeded by: Ajay Kumar

Health Secretary of India
- In office 12 October 2017 – 31 July 2020
- Appointed by: Appointments Committee of the Cabinet
- Minister: J. P. Nadda; Harsh Vardhan
- Preceded by: C. K. Mishra
- Succeeded by: Rajesh Bhushan

Personal details
- Born: 30 April 1960 (age 65) Haryana
- Occupation: Civil servant

Preeti Sudan (born 30 April 1960) is a retired IAS officer and former Chairperson of the Union Public Service Commission (UPSC). Sudan joined the UPSC as a member in November 2022. Previously, she held the office of the Health Secretary of India from October 2017 to July 2020. Sudan has also served as a member of the Independent Panel for Pandemic Preparedness and Response (IPPR), an independent group overseeing the World Health Organization (WHO) from 2020 till 2022.

Sudan earned a degree in Economics and Social Policy and Planning from the London School of Economics and Political Science. She has been trained in public finance management in Washington.

== Career ==
A 1983 batch IAS officer of the Andhra cadre, Sudan was previously a Secretary, Department of Food and Public Distribution. Apart from this, she has served at various central and state level positions such as a Joint Secretary in the Ministry of Defense as well as in position relating to disaster management and tourism. She has been a key functionary in the planning and implementation of the Ayushman Bharat Yojana, a scheme of the Indian government's National Health Policy aiming to provide free health coverage at the secondary and tertiary level to India's bottom 40% poor and vulnerable population. She has also served as consultant in the World Bank.

Since 2020, Sudan has been serving as a member of the Independent Panel for Pandemic Preparedness and Response (IPPR), an independent group examining how the World Health Organization (WHO) and countries handled the COVID-19 pandemic, co-chaired by Helen Clark and Ellen Johnson Sirleaf and served till 28 November 2022. Thereafter, she served as a member of Union Public Service Commission from 29 November 2022 onwards. Afterwards, on 1 August 2024, she was appointed Chairman of Union Public Service Commission and served there till 29 April 2025.

== Other activities ==
- Partnership for Maternal, Newborn & Child Health (PMNCH), Member of the Board
