= Rajni Razdan =

Chairman, Union Public Service Commission
- In office 18 August 2014 – 24 November 2014
- Preceded by: D. P. Agrawal
- Succeeded by: Deepak Gupta

Rajni Razdan was an Indian Administrative Service Officer of 1973 batch of Haryana cadre. She assumed the post of Chairman of Union Public Service Commission of India. Ms. Razdan has been a UPSC member since 19 April 2010. Deepak Gupta was chosen as the new UPSC chairman in Nov. 2014 after the completion of tenure of Rajni Razdan.
