= G. K. Pillai =

G. K. Pillai may refer to:

- Gopal Krishna Pillai (born 1949), Indian Administrative Service (I.A.S) officer and the former Home Secretary of India
- G. K. Pillai (actor) (born 1924), Indian actor in Malayalam films hails from Thiruvananthapuram
- Kollam G. K. Pillai (1934–2016), Indian actor in Malayalam films hails from Kollam
