= D. P. Agrawal (UPSC chairman) =

Indian academic and civil servant

D. P. Agarwal

Chairperson of the Union Public Service Commission
- In office 16 August 2008 – 2014
- President: Pratibha Patil
- Preceded by: Subir Dutta
- Succeeded by: Rajni Razdan

Personal details
- Education: Aligarh Muslim University; IIT Delhi

D. P. Agarwal is an Indian academic and civil servant who served as Chairman of the Union Public Service Commission (UPSC) of India.

== Biography ==
Agarwal graduated in Mechanical Engineering with honors from Aligarh Muslim University in 1970, then earned his M.Tech and Ph.D. degrees from IIT Delhi in 1972 and 1978, respectively. He joined the mechanical engineering faculty at IIT Delhi in 1975 and held roles as both professor and dean. He left in 1994 to serve as Joint Educational Adviser (Technical) for the Ministry of Human Resource Development. There, he focused on the growth of quality technical education and contributed to the development of Centers for Excellence in higher technical and polytechnic education. He has also been Director of the Indian Institute of Information Technology and Management Gwalior, Managing Director of EdCIL and the warden of Kumaon hostel. He became a member of the UPSC on 31 October 2003 and was appointed Chairman by Pratibha Patil, President of India, on 16 August 2008. He preceded Rajni Razdan. While Chairman, he introduced aptitude tests to the recruitment examination process for UPSC and introduced e-governance initiatives at UPSC, including online application process for recruitment exams.

Agrawal continues to teach engineering and publish papers.

== Awards and honours ==
- Eminent Engineer, 2003, Institution of Engineers
- Engineer of the Year, 2006, Institution of Engineers
- Honorary Fellowship, 2006, Indian Society for Technical Education
- Honorary D. Sc. degree, 2009, Jiwaji University, Gwalior
- Honorary Fellowship, 2011, Institution of Electronics and Telecommunication Engineers
