= Deepak Gupta =

Deepak Gupta may refer to:

- Deepak Gupta (civil servant) (born 1951), former chairman of the Union Public Service Commission
- Deepak Gupta (judge) (born 1955), judge of the Supreme Court of India
- Deepak Gupta (attorney) (born 1977), American attorney
