= Rabindra Nath Banerjee =

Indian civil servant (born 1895)

Personal details
- Born: February 1, 1895
- Died: December 1984
- Education: Scottish Church College, University of Calcutta; Emmanuel College, Cambridge

Rabindra Nath Banerjee CSI, CIE (1 February 1895–December 1984) was an Indian Civil Service (ICS) officer.

== Career ==
A graduate of Scottish Church College and Emmanuel College, Cambridge, Banerjee entered the Indian Civil Service on 22 March 1920, arriving in India on 20 May. He served in the Central Provinces and Berar, rising to deputy commissioner by February 1930 and to revenue secretary in December 1933. In November 1936, he was appointed the provincial secretary for local self-government, becoming secretary to the governor in April 1937.

In February 1944, Banerjee was appointed secretary to the Government of India (Commonwealth Relations, and served successively as Home Secretary and as Chairperson of the Union Public Service Commission (UPSC) following India's independence. While an ICS officer, he was appointed a Companion of the Order of the Indian Empire (CIE) in the 1938 Birthday Honours list, and was further appointed a Companion of the Order of the Star of India (CSI) in the 1946 New Year Honours list.
