= L. C. Goyal =

Indian civil servant

L. C. Goyal IAS
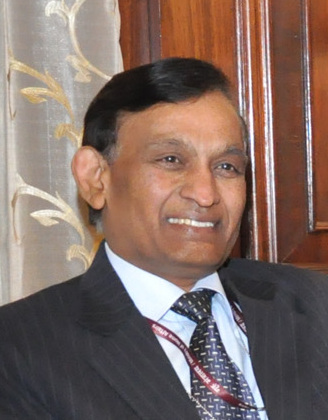

Chairman and Managing Director of the India Trade Promotion Organisation
- In office 2 September 2015 – 1 September 2022
- Prime Minister: Narendra Modi
- Minister: Nirmala Sitharaman; Suresh Prabhu; Piyush Goyal

Union Home Secretary
- In office 5 February 2015 – 31 August 2015
- Minister: Rajnath Singh
- Preceded by: Anil Goswami
- Succeeded by: Rajiv Mehrishi

Union Rural Development Secretary
- In office 1 October 2013 – 5 February 2015
- Minister: Jairam Ramesh; Gopinath Munde; Nitin Gadkari; Birender Singh
- Preceded by: Subrahmanyam Vijay Kumar
- Succeeded by: Vandana Kumari Jena (additional charge); Jugal Kishore Mohapatra

Personal details
- Born: 10 May 1955 (age 71)
- Profession: Civil servant

L. C. Goyal is a retired member of the Indian Administrative Service (IAS) belonging to 1979 batch, Kerala cadre and former Chairman and Managing Director (CMD) of India Trade Promotion Organization, a miniratna Public sector undertaking (PSU).

Goyal was born on May 10, 1955, in the state of Haryana. He is a Bachelor of Commerce & Law from Delhi University, India.

In his long career, Goyal has held many key senior management positions both at the Center as well in the Government of Kerala. Some of them being Union Home Secretary, Ministry of Home Affairs, Govt. of India; Secretary Rural Development, Ministry of Rural Development, Govt. of India (where he implemented flagship programs like MGNREGA, PMGSY, IAY & NRLM); Special Secretary, Cabinet Secretariat, Govt. of India; Principal Secretary Finance, Govt. of Kerala, Additional Secretary & Director General (CGHS), Ministry of Health & Family Welfare, Govt. of India; Joint Secretary, Ministry of Home Affairs, Govt. of India; Collector & District Magistrate Kozhikode, Govt. of Kerala; Deputy Secretary, Ministry of Corporate Affairs, Govt. of India. He retired from service on 31 August 2015.
