= Anil Goswami =

Indian bureaucrat

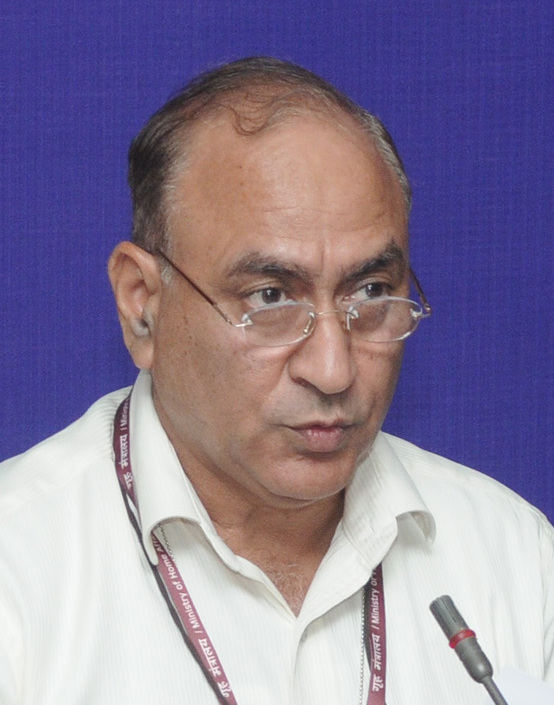

Union Home Secretary
- In office 30 June 2013 – 4 February 2015
- Minister: Sushilkumar Shinde; Rajnath Singh
- Preceded by: R. K. Singh
- Succeeded by: L. C. Goyal

Union Social Justice and Empowerment Secretary
- In office 2 July 2012 – 27 April 2013
- Minister: Mukul Wasnik; Kumari Selja
- Preceded by: Vishwapati Trivedi (additional charge)
- Succeeded by: Stuti Narain Kackar (additional charge)

Personal details
- Born: 14 January 1955 (age 71) Jammu, Jammu and Kashmir, India
- Occupation: Civil servant

Anil Goswami (born 14 January 1955) is an Indian Administrative Service officer of Jammu and Kashmir cadre and held the post of Union Home Secretary of India in the Ministry of Home Affairs till February 2015. He succeeded Raj Kumar Singh. He is the first civil servant from the state to hold this position. His son is the popular television actor Bhanu Uday.

== Early life and education ==
Goswami was born on 14 January 1955 in Jammu. He graduated from the second division in history, economics and English, and completed his post-graduation in the first division in history.

== Career ==
Goswami was the first chief executive of the Vaishno Devi Shrine Board. The board, set up in August 1986, is responsible for the maintenance of the Hindu pilgrimage Vaishno Devi. Goswami served in the state tourism department as the Principal Secretary from 29 June 2004 to 17 November 2005. He was later appointed by the state cabinet, headed by the Chief Minister Ghulam Nabi Azad, as the Principal Secretary to the Chief Minister on 17 November 2005. He held this office until 17 July 2008.

On 4 February 2009 he took over the office of Principal Secretary of the Industries and Commerce Department. He was a member of the delegation that visited the Line of Control in North Kashmir in September 2009.

On 4 February 2015 he was made to resign due to his admittance of talking to the CBI to favour the arrested Singh in the Saradha Scam case. He was found to commit the telephone call to CBI and hence resigned after queried by the Home Ministry Office and the PMO office.

=== Home Secretary ===
Goswami assumed the office of Secretary of Ministry of Social Justice and Empowerment on 2 July 2012. He remained in this capacity until 27 April 2013, when he was appointed the officer on special duty (OSD) in the Ministry of Home Affairs. He was named Union Home Secretary by the appointing committee of the cabinet chaired by the Prime Minister of India, Manmohan Singh. The two other candidates who were considered for the position but not selected by the committee were Secretary Ministry of Steel D.R.S. Chaudhary and P. K. Misra, Secretary Department of Personnel and Training, Ministry of Personnel, Public Grievances and Pensions. Goswami assumed the office on 1 July 2013 after the retirement of Raj Kumar Singh of the Bihar cadre. He is the first civil servant from Jammu and Kashmir to serve as Home Secretary of India. He remained in office until June 2015.

== Controversy ==
On 21 August 2014, Uttarakhand Governor Aziz Qureshi informed the Supreme court of India that he had received two calls from Mr. Goswami informing him that he has two options, either to resign or prepare to be sacked. Government claimed that it did not attempt to force Qureshi from office. The Supreme Court, however, ordered the centre to explain whether Mr Qureshi had in fact received the alleged two phone calls from the Center asking him to resign.

== Update ==
On 4 February 2015, news channels were buzzing with reports of Goswami being asked to resign or be ready to be sacked, as he is alleged to have tried to stall the arrest of Saradha scam accused and former Minister Matang Sinh. Shortly afterwards, Goswami resigned.
