= Mata Prasad =

Indian Administrative Service Officer

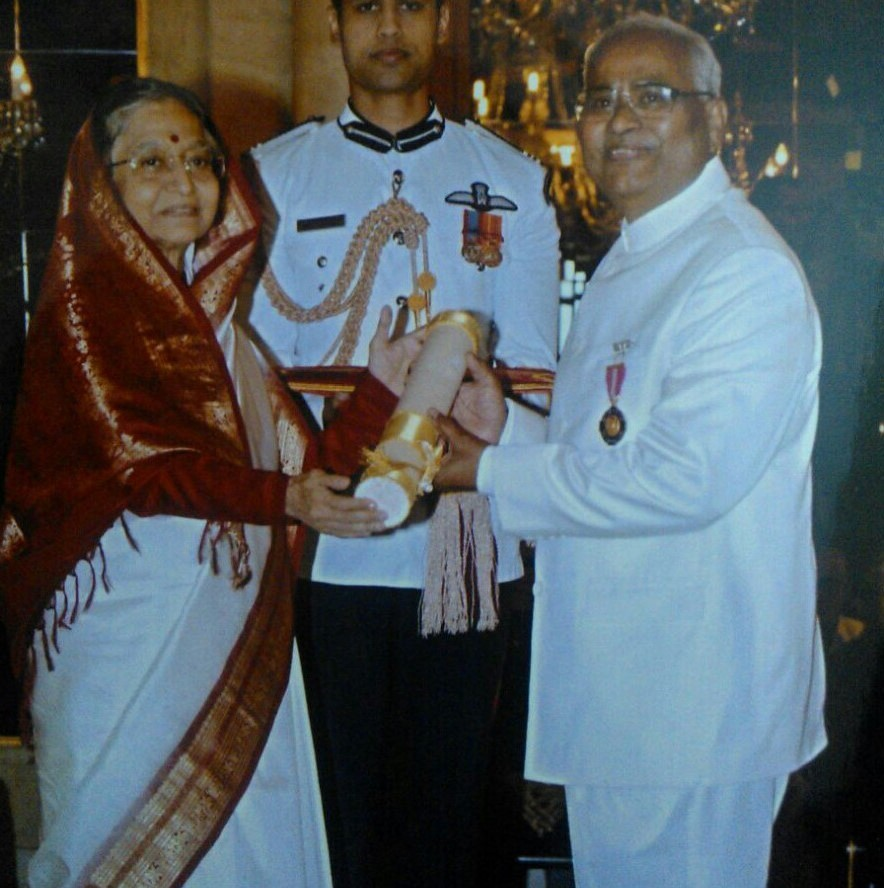

Chairman of the Union Public Service Commission
- In office 9 September 2003 – 4 January 2005
- Appointed by: A. P. J. Abdul Kalam
- Preceded by: P. C. Hota
- Succeeded by: S. R. Hashim

Personal details
- Born: 1925 Uttar Pradesh, India
- Died: 19 January 2021 (aged 95–96)
- Occupation: Retired IAS Officer
- Awards: Padma Bhushan

Mata Prasad was an Indian Administrative Service officer. He was one of the first people from the Scheduled Castes to become an IAS officer. He is a former chairman of the Union Public Service Commission of India. He served as the chief secretary of the state of Uttar Pradesh from June 1995 to October 1996, thus becoming the first Scheduled Caste officer to head the state bureaucracy. The Government of India awarded him the third highest civilian honour of the Padma Bhushan, in 2012, for his contributions to civil service.

== Biography ==
Born in the Indian state of Uttar Pradesh, Mata Prasad secured his master's degree in first class from Allahabad University and started his career as an assistant professor in October 1960 at the department of economics of the university. He resigned from the academic post when he was selected to the Indian Administrative Service in 1962 and served the civil service for over 35 years till his superannuation as the secretary of Water Resources of the Government of India. In between he held several positions such as District Collector of the districts of Almora, Etah, Lakhimpur and Bareilly as well as the Divisional Commissioner of Agra district. Subsequently, he served as the Managing Director of the Cement Corporation of Uttar Pradesh before returning to revenue department posts as the secretary to the Government of Uttar Pradesh and headed various departments including Public Enterprises, Administrative Reforms, Planning, Home, Jail, Home Guards, Civil Defence, Political Pensions and Official Language. Moving to the Union Government as a Joint Secretary at the Ministry of Human Resource Development, he headed the Department of Youth Affairs and served as a Joint Secretary, Additional Secretary and later, as a Secretary at the Ministry of Welfare, in charge of the Department of Personnel Training.

It was during his tenure as the Secretary, he made news by becoming the subject of a power struggle between Sitaram Kesari, the then Minister of Welfare who wanted Prasad to stay at his ministry, and Mulayam Singh Yadav, chief minister of Uttar Pradesh during that time, who invited Prasad to head the state bureaucracy. Prasad, eventually, decided to accept the latter post and became the first dalit chief secretary of the state, starting his stint in June 1995 during Mayawati's first incumbency as the state chief minister, holding the post till October 1996. His tenancy as the chief secretary or his relationship with Mayawati were not reported to have been smooth. He returned to central government service in 1996 as the secretary at the Ministry of Water Resources and retired from civil service in February 1999, after getting a one-year extension of service. It was reported that he was a candidate to become a cabinet secretary, supposedly the first dalit to get to the rank, but his candidature was overlooked. However, he was appointed a member of the Union Public Service Commission on 23 April 1998 and, after a stint of five years, he became the chairman of the agency on 8 September 2003. He retired from the position on 4 January 2005, succeeded by S. R. Hashim. He is associated with Sitapur Shiksha Sansthan, a Lucknow-based educational organization, as a member of its Board of Advisors. The Government of India included him in the Republic Day Honors list for the civilian award of the Padma Bhushan in 2012.

== See also ==
- K. R. Narayanan
- K. G. Balakrishnan
- Dalit
