= Shashi Kant Sharma =

12th Comptroller and Auditor General of India

Shashi Kant Sharma IAS (Retd.)
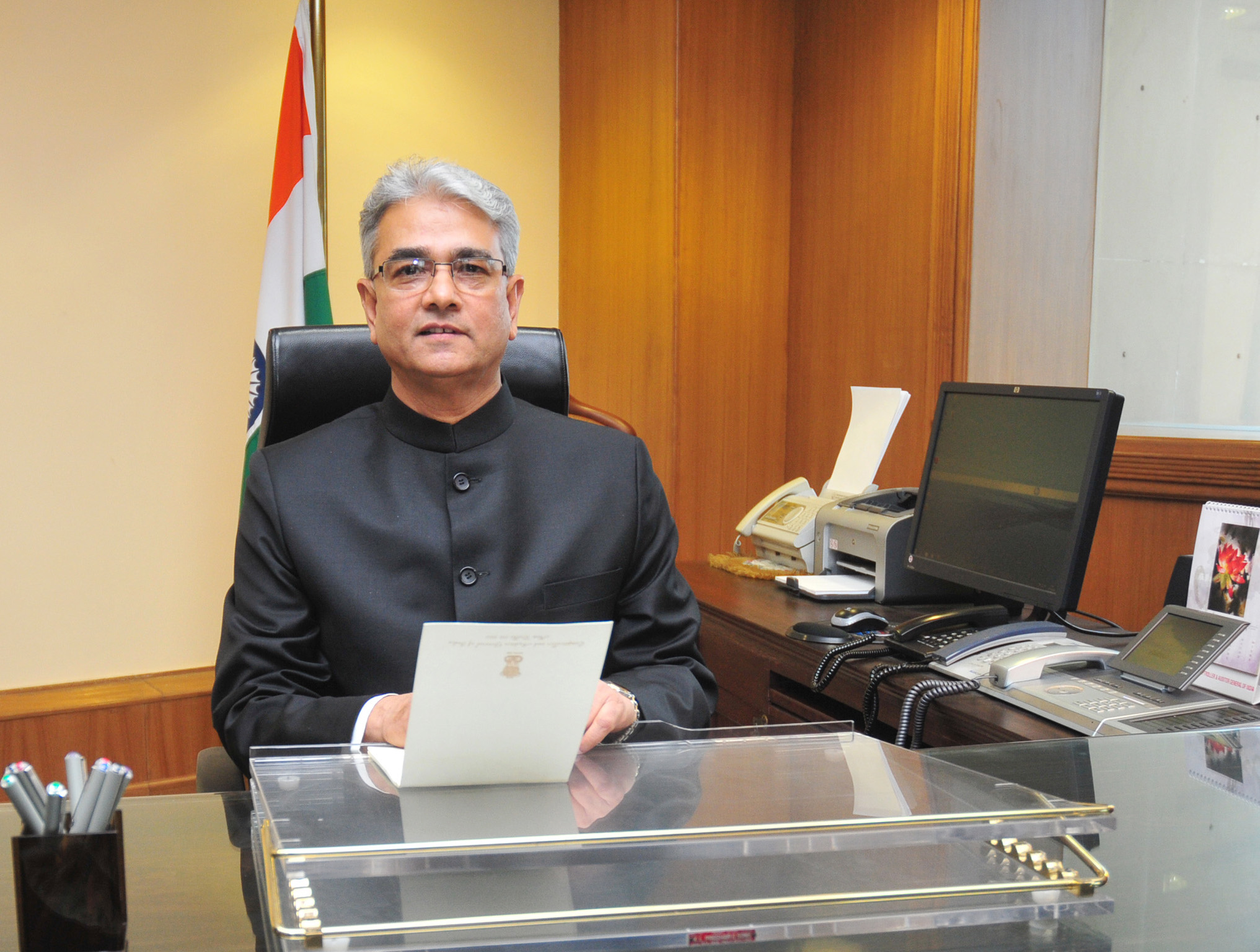
- Shashi Kant Sharma taking charge as the Comptroller and Auditor General of India

Chairman of United Nations Board of Auditors
- In office 11 January 2017 – 24 September 2017
- Preceded by: Vinod Rai
- Succeeded by: Rajiv Mehrishi

12th Comptroller and Auditor General of India
- In office 23 May 2013 – 24 September 2017
- Preceded by: Vinod Rai
- Succeeded by: Rajiv Mehrishi

35th Defence Secretary of India
- In office 14 July 2011 – 23 May 2013
- Preceded by: Pradeep Kumar
- Succeeded by: Radha Krishna Mathur

Financial Services Secretary of India
- In office 9 February 2011 – 11 July 2011

Information and Technology Secretary of India
- In office 24 September 2010 – 8 February 2011

Personal details
- Born: Shashi Kant Sharma; 25 September 1952 (age 74) Chandausi, Uttar Pradesh
- Education: University of York; University of Allahabad; University of Agra
- Occupation: Retired Central Civil Servant (IAS)

Shashi Kant Sharma is a retired 1976 batch IAS officer of Bihar cadre. He was the Comptroller and Auditor General of India. In July 2014 he assumed office as a Member of the United Nations Board of Auditors. On 11 January 2017, Sharma took over as the Chairman of the United Nations Board of Auditors. The reports of the Board serve as a key input for policy making within the UN.

== Education ==
He has BSc from University of Allahabad, an MSc in Administrative Science and Development Problems from University of York, and is a MA in Political Science from Agra University.

== Career ==
=== As an IAS officer ===
Shashi Kant Sharma served in key positions for both Union and Bihar Governments, like as the Excise Commissioner of Bihar, Labour Commissioner of Bihar, managing director of Bokaro Industrial Development Authority and as the District Magistrate and Collector of Patna, Singhbhum, Palamau and Bhagalpur in Bihar Government, and as the Union Defence Secretary, Union Financial Services Secretary, Union Information Technology Secretary, Director General (Acquisition) in Ministry of Defence, Additional Secretary in Department of Administrative Reforms and Public Grievances in Ministry of Personnel, Public Grievances and Pensions and as Additional Secretary in Ministry of Defence in the Union Government.

=== Post-retirement ===
==== Comptroller and Auditor General of India ====
Since taking over as CAG of India, Sharma has finalized more than 100 Audit Reports for the Union Government and 250 Audit Reports for the State Governments. Some of these reports relate to critical issues, such as the Agricultural Crop Insurance Scheme, Nirmal Bharat Abhiyan, Flood control and Flood Forecasting, E-auction of coal mines, Environmental Clearance mechanism, Turnaround plan and financial restructuring of Air India, Sharing of Revenue by Private service providers in Telecom sector, Public Debt Management, Implementation of PAHAL (DBTL) Scheme by the Oil Marketing Companies, Construction of Indo China Border Roads by Border Roads Organisation, Audit of Pricing Mechanism of Major Petroleum Products, Audit of Hydrocarbon Production Sharing Contracts, Reports on Defence Services (Air Force and Navy), PPP Projects in NHAI, Defence Services (Army and Ordnance Factories and Defence PSUs), and Audit of Refit of Indian Naval Ships.

He was elected by the General Assembly of United Nations as a Member of the UN Board of Auditors in 2014 for a term of six years. His other international responsibilities include Member of UN Panel of External Auditors, Chair of the Knowledge Sharing and Knowledge Services Committee of the International Organisation of Supreme Audit Institutions (INTOSAI), Chair of the Working Group of INTOSAI on I.T. Audit. He was also the Chairman of the Asian Organization of Supreme Audit Institutions (ASOSAI) until February 2015, and is currently a member of its Governing Board.

In a Public Interest Litigation (PIL), Prashant Bhushan questioned the selection of former Defence Secretary, saying that there was conflict of interest in this appointment as CAG. The manner in which his appointment had been made adversely was thought of to possibly affect the perception of impartiality that is necessary for an independent constitutional office-holder. The Delhi High Court, by a detailed judgement in the Writ Petitions no 4653/2013 and WP 4619/2013 dated 13.08.2014, held that the appointment did not violate the principles of institutional integrity nor was the appointment arbitrary. The Hon’ble Court observed that he has an unblemished and impeccable record, and that his integrity cannot be doubted. The Petitioners challenged the Delhi High Court judgement before the Supreme Court. The Hon’ble Supreme Court, in its order in SLP No.24328/2014 on 11 February 2015, dismissed the petition by holding that there was no good ground to interfere in the High Court's judgement and order. It did not accept Prashant Bhushan's plea for examining the appointment of Sharma as CAG, a Constitutional post, on the mere apprehension of conflict of interest. The Hon’ble Court accepted the submission of the Attorney General that Sharma had an exceptional career without blemish.

Sharma demitted the office of Comptroller and Auditor General of India on 24 September 2017.

==== Chairman of United Nations Board of Auditors ====
Sharma assumed the office of Chairman of United Nations Board of Auditors on 11 January 2017.

Sharma demitted the office of Chairman of United Nations Board of Auditors on 24 September 2017.
