= Ajay Kumar Bhalla =

Governor of Manipur (born 1960)

Ajay Kumar Bhalla IAS (Retd.)
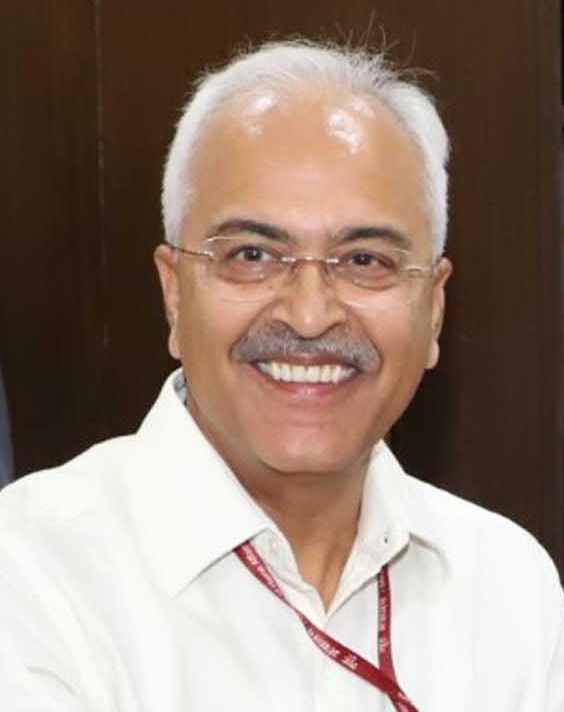
- Bhalla c. 2019

Governor of Manipur
- Incumbent
- Assumed office 3 January 2025
- Chief Minister: N. Biren Singh (until 13 February 2025); President's rule (13 February 2025 - 3 February 2026); Yumnam Khemchand Singh (from 4 February 2026)
- Preceded by: Lakshman Acharya

Governor of Nagaland
- Additional Charge
- In office 25 August 2025 – 13 March 2026
- Chief Minister: Neiphiu Rio
- Preceded by: La. Ganesan
- Succeeded by: Nand Kishore Yadav

Union Home Secretary
- In office 22 August 2019 – 22 August 2024
- Appointed by: Appointments Committee of the Cabinet
- Preceded by: Rajiv Gauba
- Succeeded by: Govind Mohan

Union Power Secretary
- In office July 2017 – July 2019
- Preceded by: P. K. Pujari
- Succeeded by: Subhash Chandra Garg

Personal details
- Born: 26 November 1960 (age 65) Jalandhar, Punjab, India
- Party: Independent
- Education: University of Delhi, University of Queensland
- Occupation: Retired civil servant

Ajay Kumar Bhalla (born 26 November 1960) is a retired Indian bureaucrat and IAS officer of 1984 batch who is currently serving as the 19th Governor of Manipur from January 2025. He also acted as Governor of Nagaland as additional charge from August 2025 to March 2026. He previously served as the Home secretary of India having assumed the office on 23 August 2019, succeeding Rajiv Gauba. from Assam Meghalaya cadre. He served as Home Secretary of India for around five years there till 22 August 2024. He hails from Jalandhar, Punjab, India.

In December 2024 Bhalla was appointed as Manipur Governor. In August 2025 he was also given with the additional charge of Nagaland Governor and served in that position till 13 March 2026.

== Early life and education ==
Ajay Kumar Bhalla was born on 26 November 1960 in Jalandhar, Punjab, India. Before pursuing higher studies, he completed his early education in Punjab. Bhalla obtained his Master of Science degree in botany from the University of Delhi. He further enhanced his academic qualifications by earning a Master of Business Administration (MBA) degree from the University of Queensland in Brisbane, Australia. He received his M.Phil. degree in Social Sciences from Panjab University.

== Career ==
Bhalla is a 1984-batch Indian Administrative Service (IAS) officer of the Assam-Meghalaya cadre.

=== Union Home Secretary ===
Bhalla was appointed as the Union Home Secretary on 22 August 2019. His tenure has been marked by several significant events and challenges:

- Oversaw the implementation of changes following the abrogation of Jammu & Kashmir's special status in 2019.
- Managed the government's response to nationwide protests against the Citizenship Amendment Act (CAA) in late 2019.
- Spearheaded the nation's fight against the COVID-19 pandemic, overseeing lockdown measures and coordinating with states.
- Handled various security challenges, including farmers' protests in Delhi and the Manipur conflict.

Bhalla's tenure as Home Secretary has been extended multiple times, with his fourth extension in August 2023 set to keep him in office till 22 August 2024. This made him only the second Union home secretary to complete five years in office and thereafter, he retired.

=== Previous positions ===
Prior to his appointment as Home Secretary, Bhalla held several key positions in the Indian government:

1. Secretary, Ministry of Power (July 2017 - July 2019)
2. Director General of Foreign Trade
3. Additional Secretary, Department of Commerce
4. Joint Secretary, Ministry of Coal
5. Director (Ports), Department of Shipping

== Governorships (2025 - Incumbent) ==
=== Governor of Manipur (2025 - Incumbent) ===
Bhalla has been the Governor of Manipur since January 2025. During his gubernatorial post, President's rule was imposed on the state for the 11th time. From 2025 to 2026, he had been in charge of administrative and other security-related decisions.

=== 2023-2025 Manipur violence ===
On 25 December 2024, President Droupadi Murmu notified Bhalla as the new Governor of Manipur relieving Assam Governor Lakshman Acharya who was holding additional charge of Manipur since July 2024. The appointment was significant as it came amidst the then ongoing 2023–2025 Manipur violence. Following this, on 3 January 2025, Bhalla was sworn in as the 19th Governor of Manipur by the then Manipur High Court Chief Justice D. Krishnakumar in Imphal.

The following day, Bhalla held a unified command meeting for security review which was attended by the Security Adviser Kuldiep Singh and Director-General of Police Rajiv Singh among others. Manipur Chief Minister N. Biren Singh did not attend the meeting. During the meeting, Bhalla suggested that the state police charges miscreants with National Security Act 1980 to bring peace in the state. The act provides detention for a year without trail. Bhalla asked the security agencies to prepare dossiers of key suspects who were fuelling violence in Manipur and initiate action against them. The Central Reserve Police Force (CRPF) and the Border Security Force (BSF) flagged ceasefire violations by the Pambei faction of the United National Liberation Front (UNLF). Bhalla also discussed employment opportunities for the state's youth.

On 13 February 2025, President's rule was imposed on Manipur four days after the Chief Minister N. Biren Singh resigned after meeting then India's Home Minister Amit Shah. In addition, the state assembly was put under animated suspension after receiving a report from Bhalla. Thereby, Bhalla was handed over administrative and other security-related decisions. Previously, the Supreme Court of India had noted called the ensuing violence in the state as the "absolute breakdown of constitutional machinery". This marked the 11th time that President's rule has been imposed on the state.

On the occasion of commemorating Kargil Vijay Diwas, Bhalla claimed that peace and normalcy was returning to Manipur in July 2025. For this, multiple checkpoints have been strategically established across the districts on its National Highways to ensure essential supplies of food and medicines. In addition, community outreach to dismantle armed networks and curb extortion was also in place. In September 2025, he announced that a three-phase resettlement plan for those displaced by the conflict is underway with increased security personnels deployed and Quick Reaction Team (QRT) of the Indian Army stationed. Nevertheless, he recommended extension of the Armed Forces (Special Powers) Act across the state for another six months a few days later with the exception of the jurisdiction of 13 police stations in five districts.

On 4 February 2026, the President's rule was revoked and Yumnam Khemchand Singh was sworn in as the new chief minister and the Manipur Legislative Assembly was reinstated.

=== Land notification ===
On 13 September 2025, addressing a public meeting at Churachandpur, Bhalla urged its people not to allow settlements of people from 'beyond the borders' and asserted that steps are being undertaken to stop the migration from Myanmar amidst its conflict. On 18 September, while under Bhalla's administration, the state's Land Resources Department issued a government notification that laid guidelines for the procedure for sale, purchase and registration of land within the state. The notification required land purchases to require permission of the Deputy Commissioner of the respective districts who will verify the application and forward it to the said department. An internal committee will further scrutinise the application and present them to a panel for final recommendations. In addition, land transactions above ₹200,000 must be completed through bank clearance. The directive was issued under the Manipur Regulation of Sale Deed Registration (Amendment) Rules, 2023.

Several tribal organisations including the Kuki Inpi Manipur, United Naga Council, and Tribal Youth Council Manipur, urged the governor to withdraw the notification claiming that it contravenes constitutional protection of tribal land under Article 371C of the Indian Constitution. This vested all land related matters in the hill areas to the tribal communities according to their customary law practices.

=== Governor of Nagaland (2025 - 2026) ===
Following the death of then Governor of Nagaland La. Ganesan on 15 August 2025, Bhalla was given the additional charge of the state the following day. He was sworn in as the acting Governor of Nagaland on 25 August 2025 by the then Chief Justice of the Gauhati High Court Ashutosh Kumar. Five of the 17 major tribes of the state–Ao, Angami, Lotha, Rengma, and Sümi–did not participate in the ceremony in protest of the four-decade-old job reservation policy for backward tribes in the state.

In September 2025, Bhalla was inducted as the chief patron of the Nagaland Bharat Scouts and Guides in Kohima.

He was relieved of his additional duties as the Governor of Nagaland when Nand Kishore Yadav was sworn in as the Governor.

Political offices
Preceded by Lakshman Acharya; Additional Charge	Governor of Manipur; 3 January 2025 - Present	Incumbent
Preceded by La. Ganesan	Governor of Nagaland; 16 August 2025 - 6 March 2026; Additional Charge	Next: Nand Kishore Yadav
