= Ranadhir Chandra Sarma Sarkar =

11th Chairman, Union Public Service Commission of India
- In office May 1971 – February 1973
- Preceded by: K. R. Damle
- Succeeded by: A. R. Kidwai

Personal details
- Born: 1908
- Died: 2000 (aged 91–92)
- Occupation: Bureaucrat

Ranadhir Chandra Sarma Sarkar, I.A.S. (1908–2000) was an Indian bureaucrat and civil servant. He was the 11th chairman of the Union Public Service Commission of India from May 1971 to February 1973. He served as the Law Secretary of Government of India. He has authored various books and articles in various journals related to law which have been referred to by other academics. In 1973-74, Sarkar was part of the committee set by All India Panchayat Parishad, along with S. K. Dey and headed by Laxmi Mall Singhvi. The committee's report helped in granting the constitutional status to the Panchayati Raj. He studied at Presidency University, Kolkata.

== Works ==
- An Approach to the Constitution of India, 1981
- The Press in India, 1984 ISBN 9994046829
- Union-State Relations in India, 1986
- The Constitution of India, 1991 ISBN 8121403529
