= Rajiv Gauba =

32nd Cabinet Secretary of India

Rajiv Gauba IAS (Retd.)
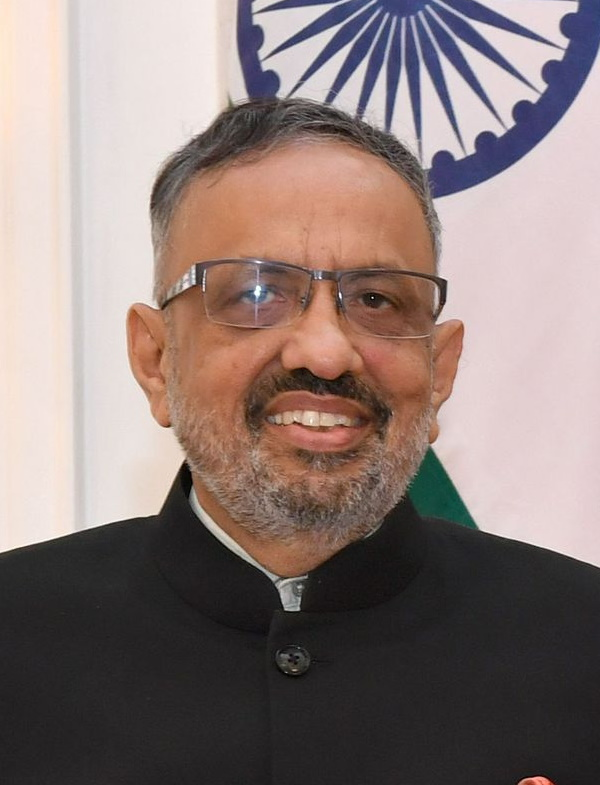

32nd Cabinet Secretary of India
- In office 30 August 2019 – 30 August 2024
- Appointed by: Appointments Committee of the Cabinet
- Prime Minister: Narendra Modi
- Preceded by: Pradeep Kumar Sinha
- Succeeded by: T. V. Somanathan

Home Secretary of India
- In office 31 August 2017 – 22 August 2019
- Minister: Rajnath Singh
- Preceded by: Rajiv Mehrishi
- Succeeded by: Ajay Kumar Bhalla

Urban Development Secretary of India
- In office 31 January 2016 – 22 June 2017
- Appointed by: Appointments Committee of the Cabinet
- Minister: Venkaiah Naidu
- Preceded by: Madhusudan Prasad
- Succeeded by: Durga Shanker Mishra

Chief Secretary of Jharkhand
- In office 27 January 2015 – 30 January 2016
- Appointed by: Chief Minister of Jharkhand
- Chief Minister: Raghubar Das
- Preceded by: Sajal Chakraborty
- Succeeded by: Raj Bala Verma

Personal details
- Born: 15 August 1959 (age 67) Punjab, India
- Spouse: Dr. Pammi Gauba (Academician)
- Education: Patna Science College (BSc); Patna University
- Occupation: Retired IAS officer

Rajiv Gauba (born 15 August 1959; IAST: Rājīva Gaubā) is a retired Indian bureaucrat and IAS officer who served as the Cabinet Secretary of India from 30 August 2019 to 30 August 2024. As of March 2025, he serves as a full time member of NITI Aayog, the Indian Government's apex public policy think tank. He served for five years as Cabinet Secretary making him longest serving cabinet secretary in history his tenure as the Cabinet Secretary of India has been extended 4 times by 1 year durations by the Appointment Committee of the Cabinet (ACC) which is chaired by the Prime Minister of India.

== Education ==
Gauba has a graduate degree and is a gold medalist in physics (BSc) from Patna Science College, Patna University.

== Career ==
In a career spanning over four decades, Rajiv Gauba has worked in several important positions in the Government of India, the Government of Bihar and the Government of Jharkhand. Prior to his appointment as Cabinet Secretary, i.e., the head of civil services in India, he served with distinction as the Union Home Secretary, Union Urban Development Secretary, and the Chief Secretary of Jharkhand.

Gauba, as a young officer and a loyal civil servant handled the Anti-Sikh riots in October/November 1984. He worked as Deputy Development Commissioner in the predominantly tribal Dumka district. Gauba had a tenure of nearly six years as district magistrate and collector first in Nalanda, then Muzaffarpur and in Gaya. His handling of elections won him notable praise in the difficult elections held in Muzaffarpur in 1994 & 1995 and Gaya in 1996.

In 1996, Gauba moved on deputation to the Government of India, first being posted as Director in Ministry of Environment, Forest and Climate Change. Gauba was later appointed the Private Secretary (Chief of Staff) to the then Raksha Mantri (Union Defense Minister) Mr. George Fernandes. In this role he helped run the very strategic office at a time when India acquired nuclear capability and won the Kargil war.

For his keen grasp of international economics & policy issues, Gauba was selected for the prestigious post of Sr. Adviser to ED, India, IMF based in Washington. The period 2002-03 was a crucial one for relations between India and the IMF. India agreed to participate in the Financial Transaction Plan of the IMF in late 2002 i.e., it became a creditor to the IMF and has continued to remain a creditor since then. Selection of India by IMF as member of the FTP, for the first time in 2002, sent strong signals regarding the country’s strength and resilience of its external sector to the international community. Gauba returned to the Union Government in 2009 as Joint Secretary in the Ministry of Environment, Forest and Climate Change where he set up the National Mission on Clean Ganga.

As Additional Secretary in Ministry of Electronics and Information Technology, Gauba oversaw the implementation of the National E-Governance Plan. Later as Additional Secretary in Ministry of Home Affairs (MHA), Gauba was the architect of National Action Plan to combat Left Wing Extremism which has helped to significantly contain this major internal security challenge.

=== Chief Secretary of Jharkhand ===
Gauba was appointed the Chief Secretary of the Government of Jharkhand by the Chief Minister of Jharkhand on 20 January 2015.

As one of the youngest Chief Secretaries, Gauba set about on an ambitious agenda which involved changing the way the governance system worked. The Government of Jharkhand saw a major downsizing, bringing down the number of departments. Jharkhand was a state of immense potential but had belied hopes. Gauba spearheaded a number of initiatives, the most notable among them being tackling this problem through a combination of proactive policing, and developmental outreach. Young officers were posted as DMs and SPs and improve the reach of police & Government administration. CAPF and State Police camps were established in remote areas and Roads & Bridges were built to promote development. These culminated in significant shrinking of the area under LWE influence.

As an industrial state Jharkhand offered immense potential. To realize this, Ease of Doing Business reforms were carried out in true earnest and in World Bank’s Ease of Bizassessment, Jharkhand leapfrogged to the third position from almost the bottom of the list in 2016. This was done by removing archaic legislations like Agricultural Market Cess and Boiler Room Inspections among others, and by introducing positive changes by way of Labor Reforms. Initial reforms in Jharkhand were viewed with skepticism yet the ethos of governance changed from a negative obstructionist approach and to a positive enabling environment.

Gauba left the state when he was appointed as a Secretary in the Government of India.

=== Urban Development Secretary ===
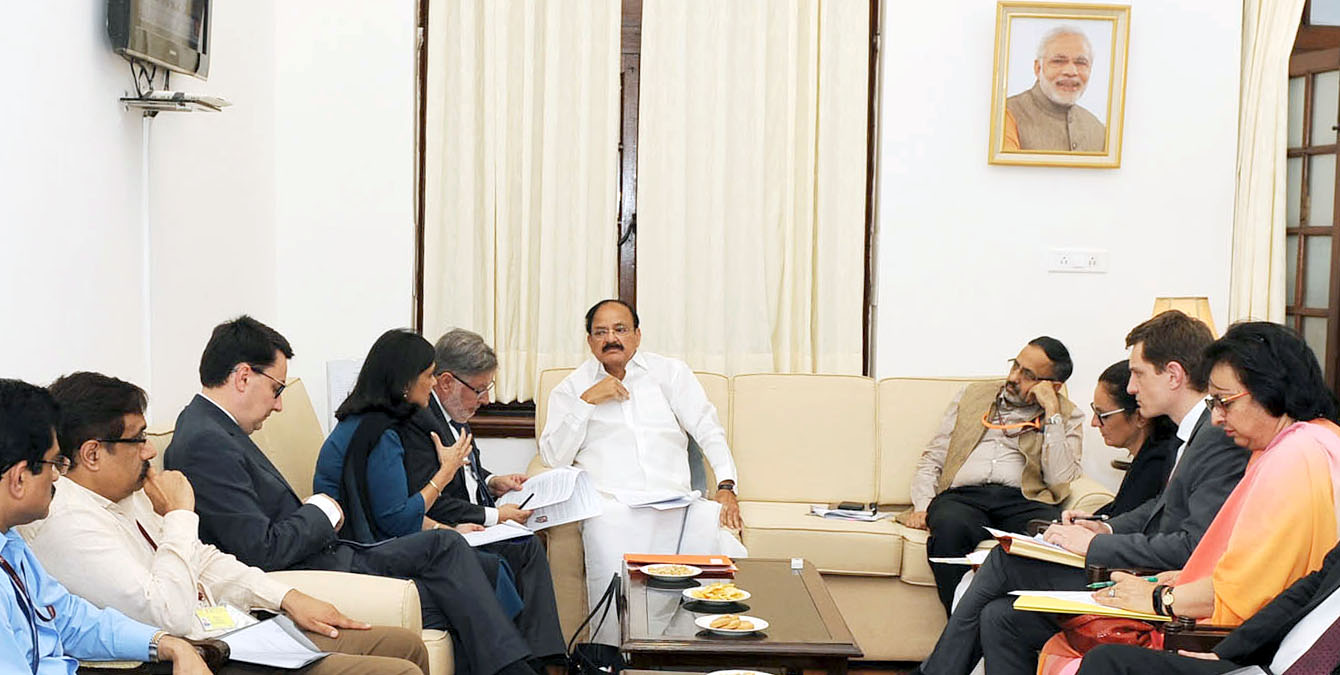
Gauba (centre-right), as the Urban Development Secretary, with the Minister of Urban Development, Venkaiah Naidu (centre-left) and the French Minister of Transport, Fisheries and Maritime Affairs (minister of state-rank), Alain Vidalies (left)

Gauba was appointed as the Union Urban Development Secretary by the Appointments Committee of the Cabinet (ACC) on 1 April 2016.

Gauba drove interventions aimed at addressing the huge infrastructure deficit in Indian cities/urban areas with focus on water supply, sewerage network and green spaces. As Urban Development Secretary, he helped conceptualize and implement a series of major initiatives for urban transformation such as the Smart Cities Mission, Swachh Bharat Mission and AMRUT Mission.

Gauba also led key initiatives of the Ministry, such as the preparation of the report of The High-Powered Committee On Decongesting Traffic In Delhi – which studied New Delhi’s traffic scenario in-depth and provided a four-pronged strategy for resolution – and it was under his tenure that the Ministry prepared the critical National Policy on Fecal Sludge and Septage Management.

One of the major projects under Gauba was the massive redevelopment project of seven general pool residential accommodations in India’s capital city New Delhi which sought to renew then 12,970 existing homes with 25,667 dwelling units, at an estimated project cost of INR 32,835 crores (operation costs for 30 years).

=== Home Secretary of India ===
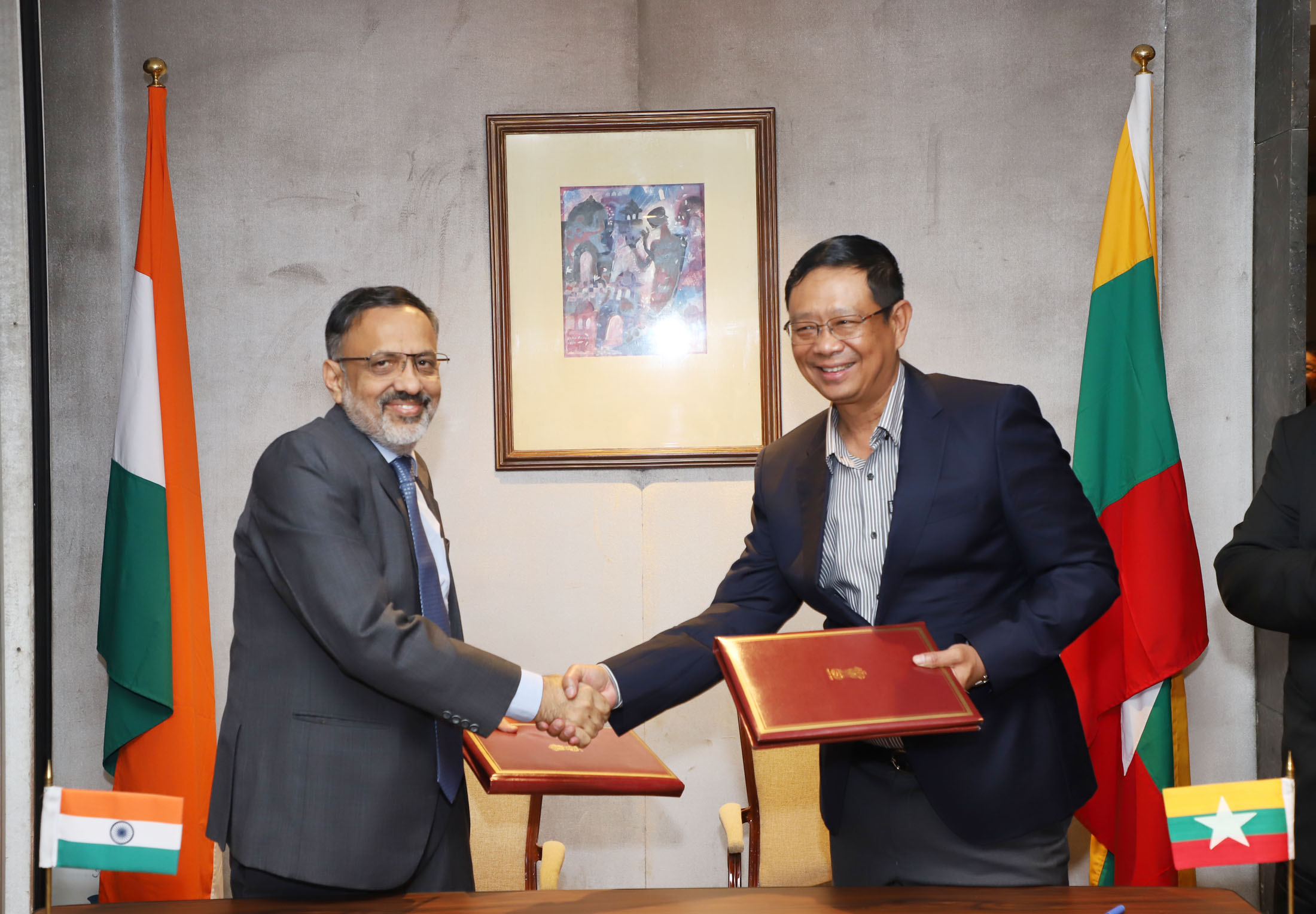
Gauba with the Deputy Minister of Home Affairs of Myanmar, Aung Thu in October 2018

Gauba was appointed as the Union Home Secretary by the ACC on 22 June 2017, succeeding Rajiv Mehrishi. He served as an officer on special duty in the rank of secretary, till Mehrishi's retirement, he formally took charge on 31 August 2017.

During Gauba’s tenure, the Government of India undertook historic step of abrogation of the Article 370 and reorganization of J&K State. Gauba closely monitored and managed the on-ground situation. One of the major actions to ensure these changes were implemented was the banning of Jammu Kashmir Liberation Front, which has been at the forefront of separatist activities and violence since 1988. Gauba’s greatest success was the peaceful abolition of Art 370 and his management of the on-ground situation in Kashmir.

Gauba as Union Home Secretary ensured effective implementation of the LWE strategy that he had conceptualized earlier. The renewed focus on mitigating and then combating the LWE menace across the country. Gauba is credited for significantly rationalizing the weapons and equipment procurement process for Central Armed Police Forces (CPRF, BSF), removing bulging procedural layers and empowering Commandant level officers with financial powers.

Gauba was appointed as Cabinet Secretary in August 2019. He handed over charge of Home Secretary to Ajay Kumar Bhalla (IAS) on 22 August 2019.

=== Cabinet Secretary of India ===
Rajiv Gauba took over as Cabinet Secretary from Pradeep Kumar Sinha on 30 August 2019 and served there till 30 August 2024. His tenure of five years as Cabinet Secretary of India is the longest in history.

=== Member, NITI Aayog ===
In March 2025, Rajiv Gauba was appointed as a full-time member of NITI Aayog, India's premier think tank. He became the fifth full-time member of NITI Aayog alongside Vijay Kumar Saraswat, Ramesh Chand, Vinod Kumar Paul and Arvind Virmani.

== Personal life ==
His wife Pammi Gauba is Director R&D Dean (PG)& Head of the Department, Department of Biotechnology, Jaypee Institute of Information Technology. Gauba has a son and a daughter.

Government offices
Preceded by Pradeep Kumar Sinha	Cabinet Secretary; 2019-present	Incumbent
Preceded by Rajiv Mehrishi	Home Secretary; 2017-2019	Succeeded by Ajay Kumar Bhalla
