= Arvind Mayaram =

Indian government officer

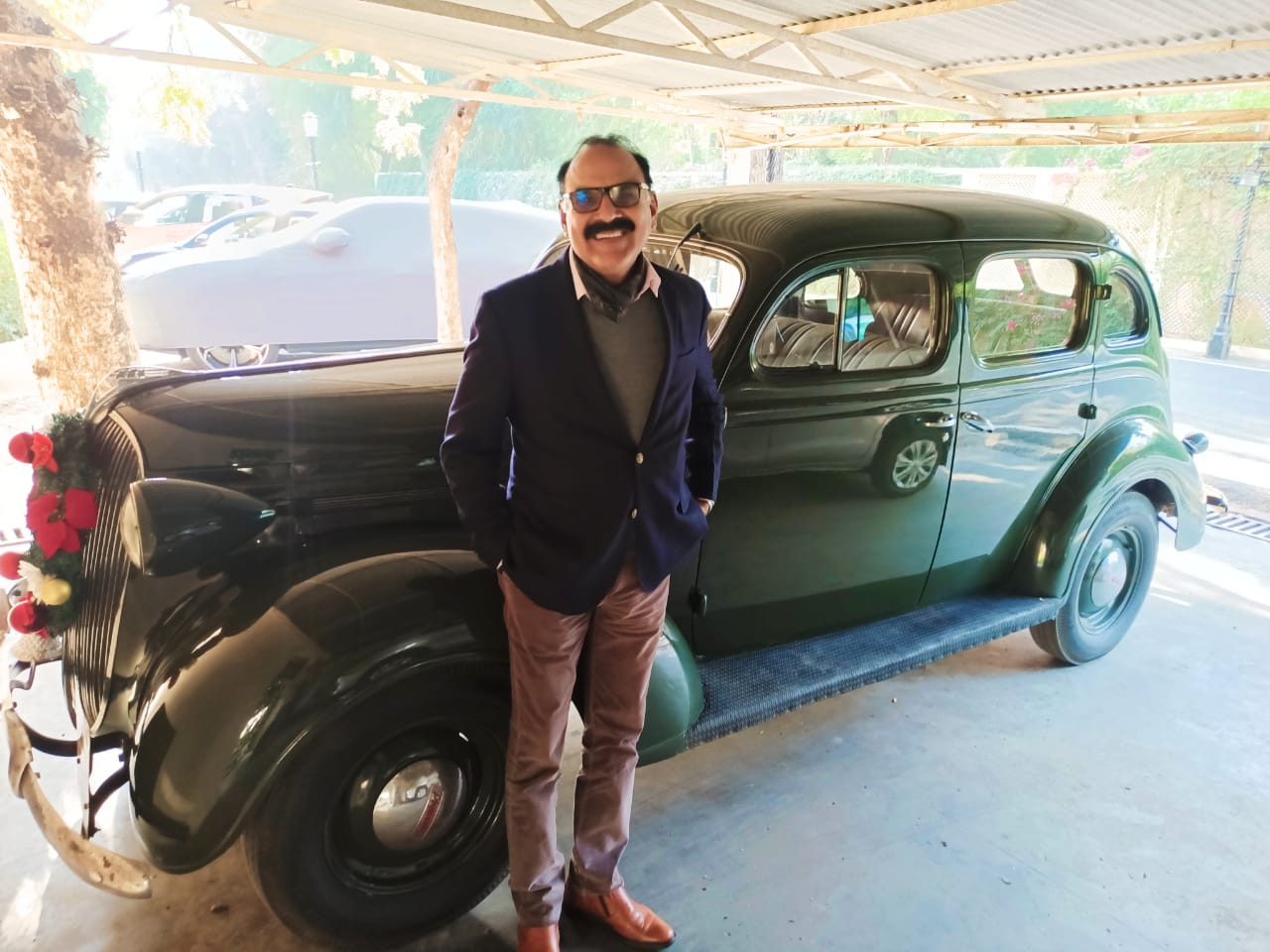

Chief Economic Advisor Government of Rajasthan, Vice-Chairperson, Rajasthan Economic Transformation Advisory Council
- In office 2018–2023
- Appointed by: Ashok Gehlot
- Preceded by: Position Established
- Succeeded by: Position Abolished

Finance Secretary of India
- In office April 2014 – October 2014
- Appointed by: Appointments Committee of the Cabinet
- Preceded by: Sumit Bose
- Succeeded by: Rajiv Mehrishi

Personal details
- Born: October 13, 1955 (age 70)
- Spouse: Shail Mayaram
- Children: 2
- Occupation: Retired IAS officer

Arvind Mayaram (born 13 October 1955) is an Indian Administrative Service (IAS) officer of 1978 batch belonging to Rajasthan cadre. He was Finance Secretary, Ministry of Finance of Government of India.

On 21 December 2018 he was appointed as principal economic advisor to Government of Rajasthan where he served till December 2023.

== Background ==
Arvind Mayaram was born on 13 October 1955; his mother, Indira Mayaram (1935–2022), was a politician from Sanganer and served as a minister in the Ashok Gehlot ministry. Arvind holds a PhD in finance from the University of Rajasthan. He is married to historian and philosopher Shail Mayaram and has two sons with her: Abhinav Mayaram, who is a businessman, and Anirudh Mayaram (1982–2005), who committed suicide due to academic stress while studying law at the Cardiff University.

Mayaram is one of the accused in the Gurugram Rajiv Gandhi Trust land grab case. His residence was raided by CBI in alleged corruption, criminal conspiracy and cheating case related to De La Rue on 12 January 2023.

== Career ==
Currently he occupies the position of Vice Chairman of the Rajasthan Economic Transformation Advisory Council. He is also Chairman of the Institute of Development Studies, Jaipur and CUTS Institute for Regulation & Competition

=== Indian Administrative Service ===
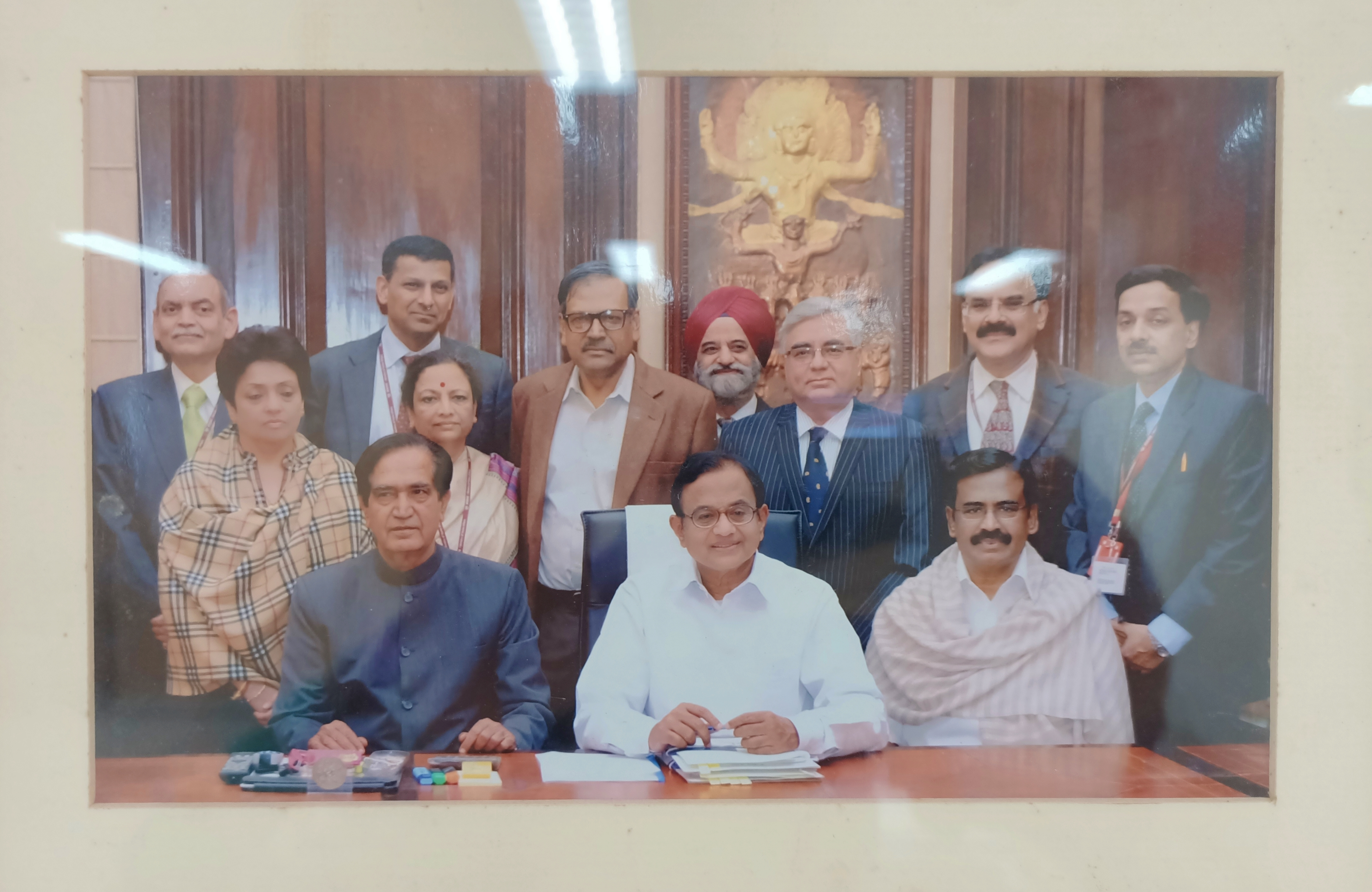
Arvind Mayaram as Finance Secretary along with Finance Minister

He had earlier held the positions of Secretary Ministry of Finance, Secretary & Special Secretary Ministry of Rural Development, Government of India. He has also been the Alternate Governor for India on the Boards of the World Bank, the Asian Development Bank & the African Development Bank. He was India's Finance (Deputy) in the G-20 & BRICS. He sat on the boards of the Reserve Bank of India and Securities and Exchange Board of India.

=== BRICS and G20 ===
He was India's chief negotiator for BRICS New Development Bank and Asian Infrastructure Investment Bank (AIIB), and co-chair of the Framework Working Group of the G-20.

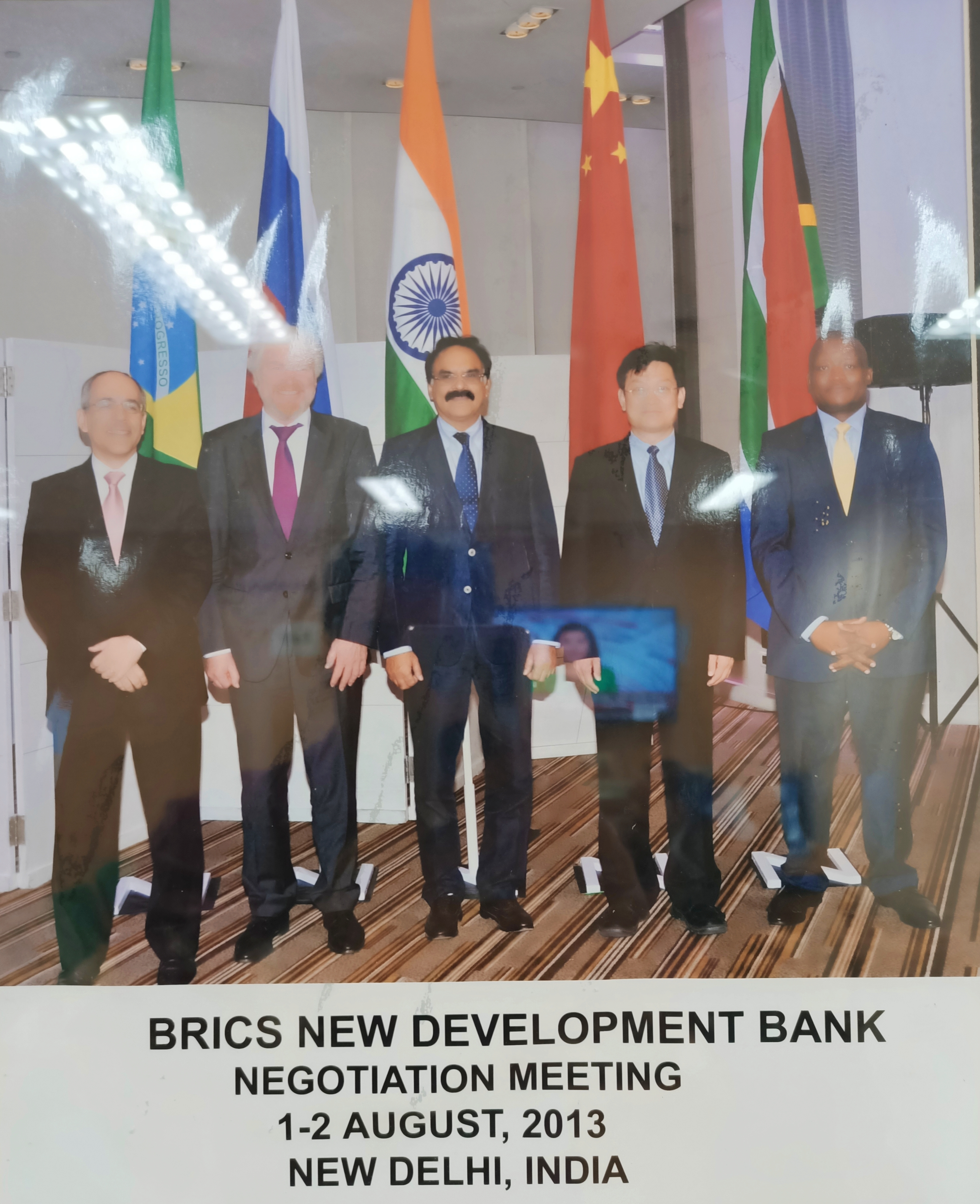
Arvind Mayaram as part of the BRICS Negotiation Meeting

=== Rajasthan ===
He has worked as Commissioner, Investment & Non Resident Indians investment, Secretary Planning, Secretary Industries and Secretary Tourism, Art & Culture. He has also had experience of senior management positions in public sector enterprises.

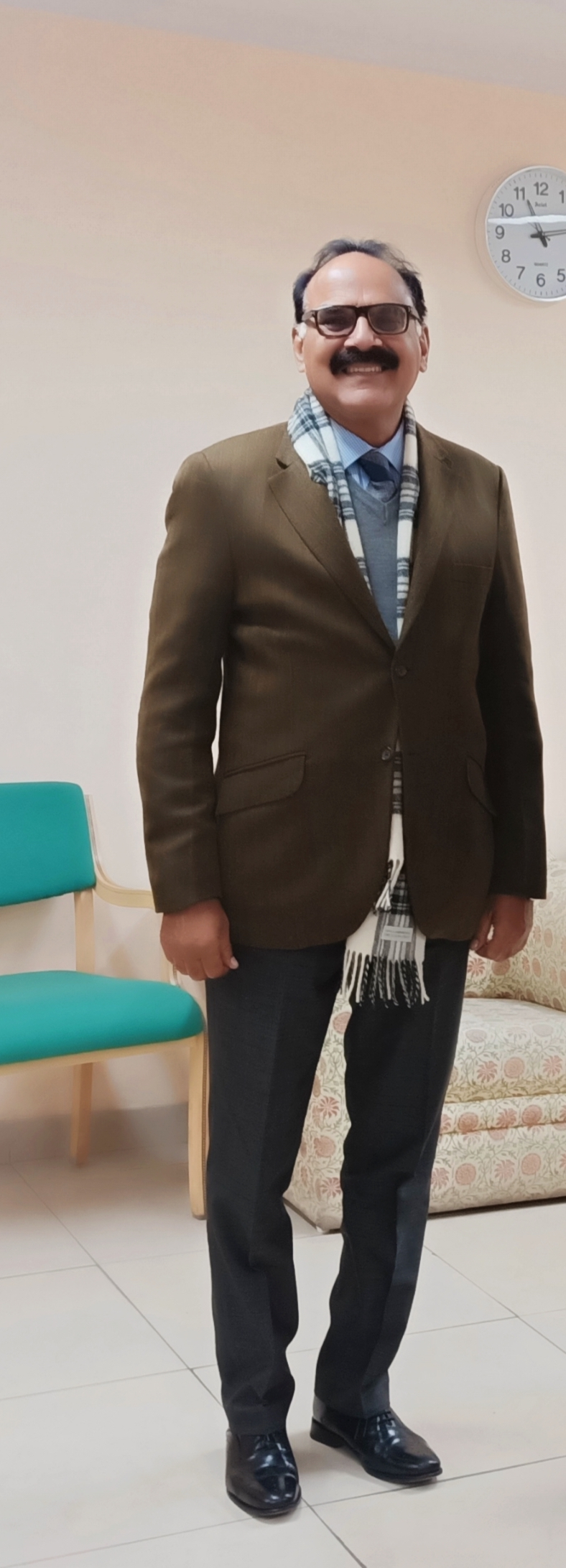
Arvind Mayaram at office in Jaipur

=== India ===
He conceptualised and established the National Skill Development Trust and National Skill Development Corporation (NSDC). He has been instrumental in several major initiatives in the area of investment, infra-structure development, Public Private Partnerships and institution building. He spear-headed the establishment of the framework for mainstreaming PPPs In India and accelerated the process of including newer areas for PPPs not only on sectoral basis but also in a large number of states across India. He also designed the first PPP module for delivering infrastructure in the rural areas.

=== Global experience ===
He has been an investment promotion expert with the UNCTAD for several years. He has undertaken a large number of missions for the UN agencies in several developing countries such as Sudan, South Africa, Fiji, Ecuador, Uzbekistan, South Africa, Cambodia etc. apart from participating in several foreign economic negotiations on behalf of the Government of India. His expertise in the area of PPPs is internationally acknowledged. He has been recognised as “Certified Public Private Partnership Specialist” by the Institute for Public-Private Partnerships (IP3) and the Water, Engineering and Development Centre of Loughborough University U.K.
