= Rajiv Mehrishi =

Indian administrative service officer

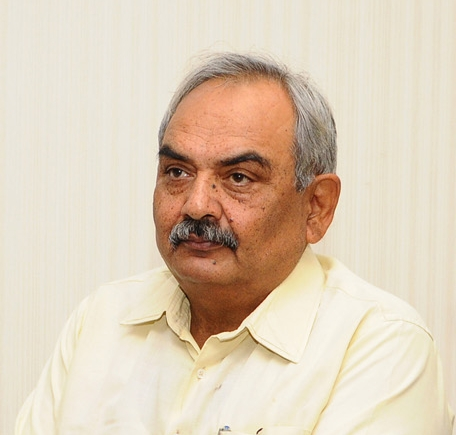

Vice Chairman of United Nations Board of Auditors
- In office 25 September 2017 – 7 August 2020
- Preceded by: Shashi Kant Sharma
- Succeeded by: G C Murmu

13th Comptroller and Auditor General of India
- In office 25 September 2017 – 7 August 2020
- Preceded by: Shashi Kant Sharma
- Succeeded by: G C Murmu

Home Secretary
- In office 31 August 2015 – 30 August 2017
- Preceded by: LC Goyal
- Succeeded by: Rajiv Gauba

Finance Secretary
- In office 29 October 2014 – 30 August 2015
- Preceded by: Arvind Mayaram
- Succeeded by: Ratan P. Watal

Chief Secretary of Rajasthan
- In office 21 December 2013 – 28 October 2014
- Preceded by: C. K. Mathew
- Succeeded by: C. S. Rajan

Fertilizers Secretary
- In office 4 October 2012 – 30 November 2013
- Preceded by: Sudhir Mital
- Succeeded by: Shaktikanta Das

Overseas Indian Affairs Secretary
- In office 17 April 2012 – 3 October 2012
- Preceded by: Parvez Dewan
- Succeeded by: Prem Narain

Personal details
- Born: 8 August 1955 (age 71) Jaipur, Rajasthan, India
- Spouse: Mira Meherishi IAS
- Education: University of Strathclyde; St. Stephen's College, Delhi University; St. Xavier's School, Jaipur
- Occupation: Senior Indian government functionary
- Awards: Padma Bhushan (2022)

Rajiv Mehrishi (born 8 August 1955) is a retired IAS officer of the 1978 batch belonging to the Rajasthan cadre who served as the 13th Comptroller and Auditor General of India (C&AG) and Vice Chairman of the United Nations Panel of External Auditors.

Prior to this he also served as the Home Secretary, Finance Secretary and Economic Affairs Secretary of India. He also served as the Chief Secretary, Government of Rajasthan. He was awarded the Padma Bhushan, India's third highest civilian award, in 2022 by the Indian Government in the Civil Service. More recently he wrote a book, India 2022.

== Personal life ==
He is married to Mira (née Sahni) also an officer of the IAS, now retired. His brother-in-law is lieutenant general Anoop Malhotra. He has three sons, Tarun (married to Aastha Jain), Tushar, and Abhinav (Vishakha Mehta). One son lives in Bangalore, one in Mumbai, and the other in the United States. He has the unique hobby of making pickles with his very own recipes and it is available under the brand name 'Pickley—Taste of Dada'.

== Education ==
Rajiv Mehrishi holds a degree in business administration from Strathclyde Business School, Glasgow. His earlier degrees of BA (History) and MA (History) were from the St. Stephen's College.

== Career ==
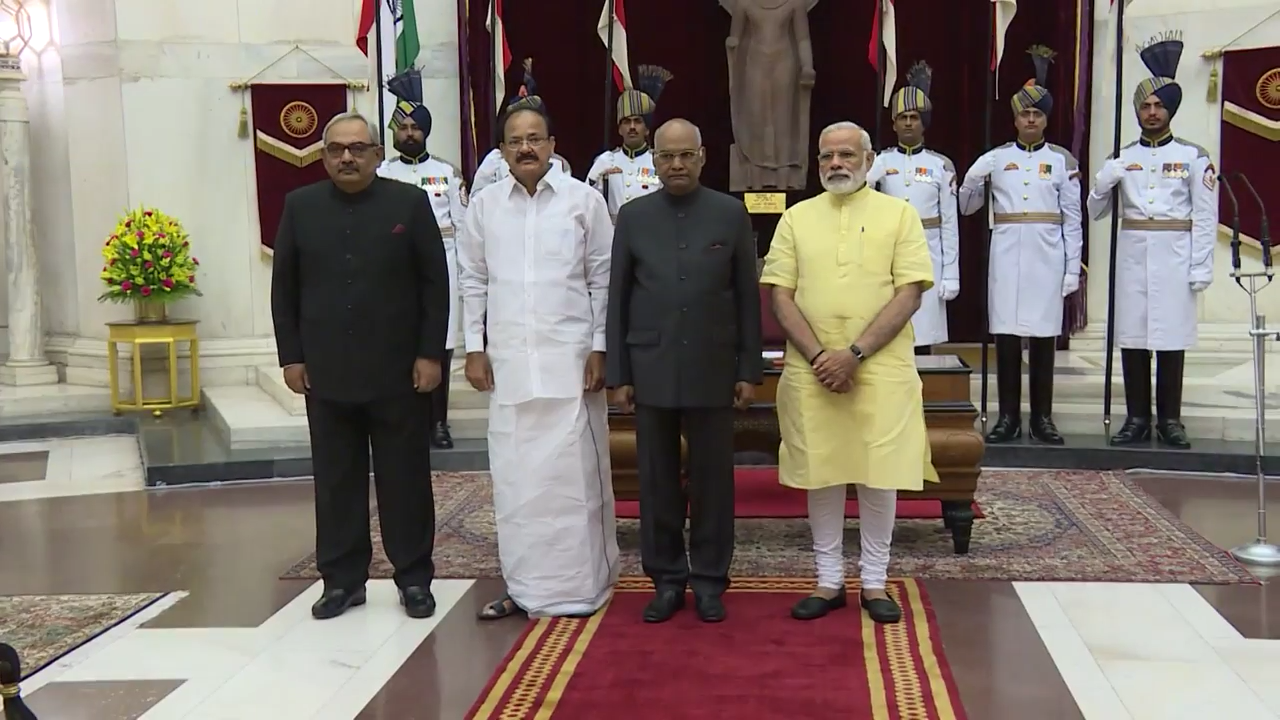
(From L-R) Rajiv Mehrishi, Vice-President, President and Prime Minister of India

=== As an IAS officer ===
Apart from being the Home Secretary of India, Rajiv Mehrishi has served in various key posts in both Union and Rajasthan governments, such as Chief Secretary of Rajasthan, Principal Resident Commissioner of Rajasthan, Principal Secretary (Finance), Chairman of Indira Gandhi Nahar Board and District Magistrate and Collector of Bikaner in Rajasthan Government, and as the Union Finance Secretary, Union Fertilizers Secretary, and Union Overseas Indian Affairs Secretary, Special Secretary in Ministry of Agriculture and Joint Secretary in the Cabinet Secretariat, in the Union Government.

Rajiv Mehrishi retired on 30 August 2017.

=== Chief Secretary of Rajasthan ===
Mehrishi was appointed the Chief Secretary of Rajasthan by the Chief Minister of Rajasthan on 21 December 2013.

=== Finance Secretary ===
Mehrishi was appointed as the Economic Affairs Secretary by the Appointments Committee of the Cabinet (ACC). As he was the senior-most Secretary in the Ministry of Finance, he was designated as Finance Secretary.

=== Home Secretary ===
Rajiv Mehrishi was appointed as the Union Home Secretary by the Appointments Committee of the Cabinet (ACC) on 31 August 2015.

=== As Comptroller and Auditor General of India ===
Rajiv Mehrishi assumed the office of Comptroller and Auditor General of India (C&AG) on 25 September 2017 and held the office till 7 August 2020. Mehrishi also concurrently became the Vice-Chairman of the United Nations Panel of External Auditors.

=== As an independent director on the board of Jio Financial Services Limited ===
In July 2023, Rajiv Mehrishi was appointed as an independent director on the board of Jio Financial Services (JFSL), a demerged entity from Reliance Industries Ltd, for a term of five years. The board meeting confirming Mehrishi's appointment was held on July 7, with the official record date being July 20.
