= Sheel Vardhan Singh =

Indian police officer (born 1963)

Director General of Central Industrial Security Force Sheel Vardhan Singh IPS
- Born: 26 August 1963 (age 62)
- Education: Bachelor of Arts English (Honours)
- Alma mater: Punjab University, Chandigarh
- Occupations: Indian Police Service, Director General of Central Industrial Security Force
- Years active: 1986-2023
- Organization: Central Industrial Security Force
- Honours: President's Gallantry medal,
- Website: https://cisf.gov.in

Sheel Vardhan Singh is a retired Indian Police Service officer, former 29th Director General of the Central Industrial Security Force, and former Special Director of the Intelligence Bureau from Bihar cadre (1986). He also served as First Secretary of the Indian High Commission in Dhaka. An alumnus of Panjab University and National Defence College, India, he serves as a member of the Union Public Service Commission from 15 January 2024 to 25 August 2028.
