= Govind Mohan =

Union Home Secretary of India

Home Secretary of India
- Incumbent
- Assumed office 23 August 2024
- Appointed by: Appointments Committee of the Cabinet
- Preceded by: Ajay Kumar Bhalla

Secretary, Ministry of Culture
- In office 1 October 2021 – 22 August 2024
- Preceded by: Raghvendra Singh
- Succeeded by: Vivek Aggarwal

Personal details
- Born: 21 September 1965 (age 61) Uttar Pradesh, India
- Education: IIT BHU; IIM Ahmedabad
- Occupation: IAS officer

Govind Mohan (born 21 September 1965) is a 1989-batch Indian Administrative Service (IAS) officer from Sikkim cadre who has been serving as the Home Secretary of India since from 23 August 2024.

== Early life ==
Mohan was born on 21 September 1965 in Uttar Pradesh. His father worked in the public work department as chief engineer.

== Education ==
Mohan completed his primary education at St. Joseph's College, Uttarakhand, and St. Francis' College, graduating in March 1982.

Afterward, Mohan earned his B.Tech degree from IIT BHU after studying there from July 1982 to March 1986. He then earned an M.B.A from the IIM Ahmedabad after studying there July 1986 to March 1988.

== Career ==
Mohan has previously served in the Government of India as the Secretary of the Ministry of Culture. He was also the Joint Secretary/Additional Secretary of the Ministry of Home Affairs, and the Joint Secretary of the Department of Economic Affairs in the Ministry of Finance.

He worked as the divisional head of the Union Territories, and has also been the Principal Resident Commissioner of the Government of Sikkim.
