= Reela Hota =

Indian Odissi performer

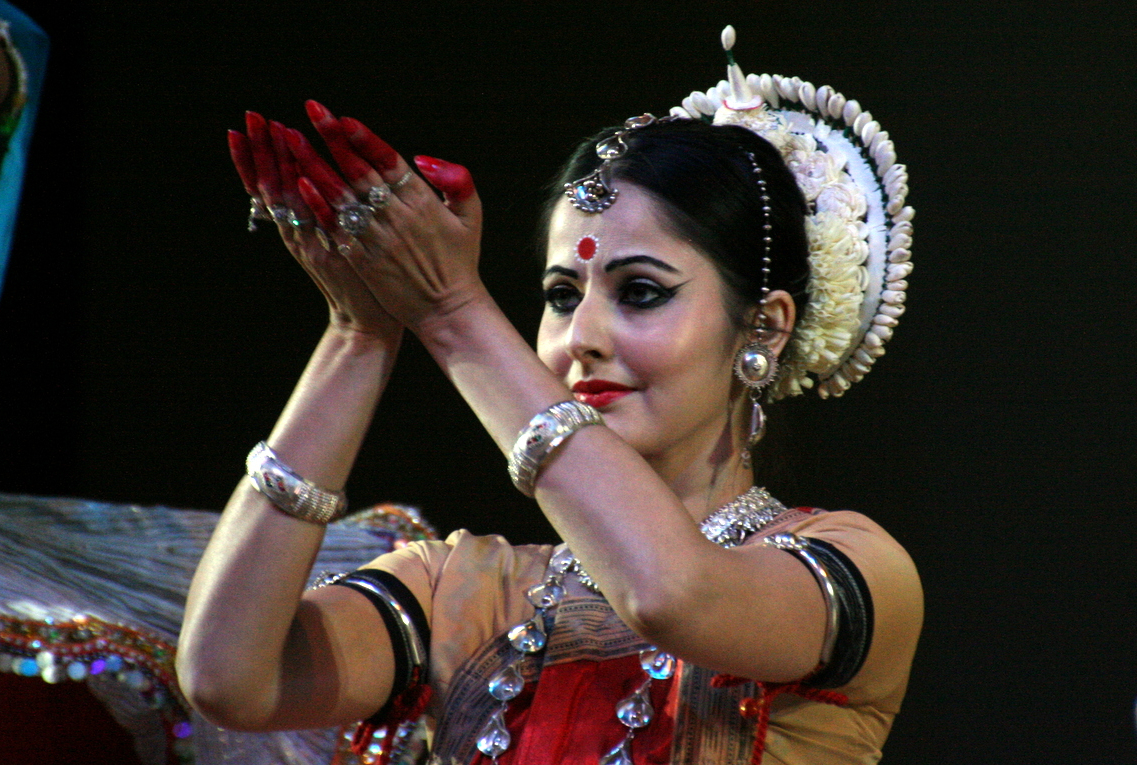
- Reela Hota performing in Ram Lila
- Born: Balasore, Odisha, India
- Occupations: Odissi Dancer, Arts Promoter
- Known for: Presenting Spiritual philosophy through dance
- Style: Odissi, Fusion Dance
- Parent(s): Purna Chandra Hota, Bijoylaxmi Hota
- Relatives: Reema Hota Singh ( sister) Prasenjeet Hota ( brother)
- Awards: Beti Bachao Beti Padhao' ( 2019) 8th International Human Rights Award(2018) Atal Bihari Vajpayee National Award (2018) Uthsav Nritya Ratna ( 2012) Sanatan Sangeet Puraskar ( 2007)
- Website: reela.org

Reela Hota (Odia: ରୀଲା ହୋତା) is an Odissi dance performer, educator and producer, who has several performances to her credit. Daughter of Yoga Guru, Bijoylaxmi Hota and former bureaucrat Purna Chandra Hota, Reela was exposed to dance, yoga & ashram life since childhood. Having trained under the 3 doyens of Odissi dance, Guru Gangadhar Pradhan, Srimati Madhavi Mudgal and Guru Kelucharan Mohapatra, she inculcated perfect rhythm, sophistication, grace and presentation skills. A trend setter, Reela Hota pioneered in making Indian spiritual philosophy such as Yoga, Kundalini and Sanskrit the theme of her performances and is credited for adding a new dimension to Odissi Dance - the spiritual aspect.

== Background ==
Reela is the youngest daughter of the Sri Purna Chandra Hota, IAS and Bijoylaxmi Hota. Purna Hota was the topper of the 1962-batch Civil-Services and went on to be the Chairman UPSC. Bijoylaxmi Hota is a great yoga teacher and has written eight books on the subject 'Yoga and Food'. She has an elder sister Reema Singh, IRS and an elder brother Prasenjeet Hota.

== Career ==
She started training early at the age of eight under Guru Gangadhar Pradhan. She went on to advance her dancing skills under the able guidance of Gurvi Madhavi Mudgal and the legendary Guru Kelucharan Mohapatra. A trend setter, her association with the great spiritual master, Paramahamsa Swami Satyananda Saraswati, inspired Reela to make Indian spiritual philosophy the theme of her performances. Reela Hota, founded the Rays of Wisdom Society, an organization dedicated to highlighting how music, dance and vital therapeutic practices in traditional systems of healing can combine to meet lifestyle challenges of today. A grade artist, she has been awarded the Sanatan Nritya Puraskar for her outstanding contribution to Indian Arts.

Reela is based out of New Delhi, India.

=== Dance Fusion ===
She diversified her range of productions by fusing Odissi with several other classical dance forms of India namely Manipuri, Kathak, Bharatnatyam and Chhau. One such masterpiece creation is Rabindra Abhivyakti, a unique fusion production based on the poetry of great Nobel Laureate, Rabindranath Tagore, which brings out the "explain the spiritual and yogic significance of his poems through different art forms".

In 2013 Reela achieved another milestone in her career to create a unique dance fusion on the healing aspect of Sanskrit when she collaborated with Ballet dancers from Bucharest National Opera House in what is the first-time-ever "amalgamation of Western classical and Odissi". Sometimes a talk from a leading expert in the field precedes the dance performance to enable a better appreciation of the work. In the second day of the International Ancient Arts Festival, 2013, a talk on "Psychodrama as a Living Process" by Psychodrama Institute of Melbourne director Sue Daniel preceded the events for the day.

In 2014, Reela worked with Broadway current sensation, Jason Macdonald to create an Unusual and exotic synergy of Dance, Music and Drama on symbolism of seven chakras.

Fusion with Italian Opera

Reela produced and starred in the first ever Opera "Ramleela in Opera". Ramleela in Opera art form saw 100 artists from 5 countries: Italy, France, Hungary, USA and India, working hard to put the spotlight at the confluence of culture and ideas. Written by Reela's mother, Yoga Guru Bijoylaxmi Hota, the story of Ramleela in opera art form started with Lord Rama's marriage to Sita, followed by the banishment of the trio (Ram, Laxman and Sita) from Ayodhya and Sita's abduction. The opera continued with Hanuman from Kishkindha visiting Lanka, clearing the path for Lord Rama to battle it out with Ravana. It finally ended with the famous trio returning to Ayodhya followed by celebrations.

Directed by Maestro Marco Pucci Catena, Ramleela in Opera, was performed to a live orchestra of 45 Indian & Western elements, conducted by Maestro Fabrizio Da Ros. The spectacle had Mattia Oliviere(Baritone), Raffaele Abette( Tenor ) and Federico Benitti( Bass) play Lord Rama, Prince Lakshman and Shri Hanuman respectively while Reela essayed the role of Sita. The Operatic score was written by the contemporary composer Maestro Antonio Cocomazzi[11] who remarked "It's a wonderful idea that two worlds that are so far apart both geographically and culturally unite through the Ramayana".

=== Organization ===
She has organized the International Ancient Arts, a unique festival-cum-symposium in collaboration with Indian Council for Cultural Relations (ICCR). These are like long-weekend festivals and include events ranging from Ramlila, classical dances, Qawwali, foreign dances, fusions and even puppetry and folk dances. The International Ancient Arts Festival of 2012, organised by Reela Hota was a two-day gala affair where Aruna Broota, a Delhi-based clinical psychologist, had some hard-hitting points to make about the social perceptions regarding the arts and Vivien Marcow Speiser, a dance therapist and professor at Lesley University expounded on the idea of 'the body as a sacred instrument'. This time the fusion was very strong with international collaborative music performance, featuring Wang Fei from China on the Geqin, Bahman Panahi from Iran on the Tar and Ustad Johar Ali from India on the violin with Reela giving a magnificent Odissi performance. In 2013, the International Ancient Arts focused on the therapeutic benefits of music and dance through ancient languages, in particular Sanskrit. The highlight of the festival was "Sanskrit: the Mantra Bhasha" where Reela danced with ballet dancers from Bucharest National Opera House to Hindustani classical music and Western classical symphonies.

=== Television ===
She is the youngest celebrity and only Odissi dancer to be featured in by Doordarshan Bharati on the Program: ‘What Celebrities Say’ with stalwarts such as Padma Bhushan Dr. Raja Reddy, Pandit Birju Maharaj and Padma Bhushan Pandit Debu Chaudhari. She was interviewed on Doordarshan. She produced and performed in a fusion dance for Colors of India series of the Rajya Sabha TV with artists Bogdan Canila, Christina Dijmaru, Lipsa Das, and others. Previously, she had also performed for the Lok Sabha TV series "State of Culture".

Community Development

Since 2008, Reela teaches dance to the local community of Rikhia, Jharkhand, as her 'sewa' or selfless service.

== Notable performances ==
Reela Hota has performed in many prestigious Indian dance festivals. A few of the notable performances are listed below.

1. Harare Arts International Festival, Zimbabwe (2007)
2. International Yoga Day, Mozambique (2018)
3. Tour of Colombia, Ministry od Culture (2018)
4. Kumbhalgarh Festival, Department of Tourism, Govt of Rajasthan
5. Pinjpre Festival, Department of Tourism, Govt of Haryana (2018)
6. CAPAM International Conference, DOPT, Govt of India (2012)
7. BRICS International Conference, Competition Commission of India (2014)
8. ICN, Competition Commission of India (2018)

== Major achievements ==
- She is the youngest celebrity and only Odissi dancer to be featured in by Doordarshan Bharati on the Program: ‘What Celebrities Say’ with stalwarts such as Padma Bhushan Dr. Raja Reddy, Pandit Birju Maharaj and Padma Bhsushan Pandit Debu Chaudhari
- She is the youngest performer and Artistic director for International BRICS, CAPAM and CVC Conference by Government of India
- She was sponsored by Indian Council for Cultural Relations (ICCR) in 2006 to visit five countries for the promotion of Indian dance and culture: Mauritius, Botswana, Zimbabwe, Zambia, South Africa

== Awards ==
1. Sanatan Nritya Puraskar by Sanatan Sangeet Sanskriti (2007) by Rai Foundation for Outstanding Contribution to Indian Arts
2. Utsav Nritya Ratna by Uthsav Music, Chennai (2012) for Outstanding Contribution to Indian
3. Art & Culture appreciation Award ( 2018) by PHD Chamber of Commerce & Industry
4. Atal Bihari Vyajpayee Award for Art and Culture ( 2018) Asian Academy of Arts and International Chamber of Media Industries
5. Senior Fellowship, Healing Aspects of Odissi Dance, ( 2019), Ministry of Culture, Government of India
