= Home Secretary (India) =

Administrative head of the Ministry of Home Affairs of India

- गृह सचिव

- Flag of India
- Incumbent; Govind Mohan, IAS since 23 August 2024
- Ministry of Home Affairs
- Member of: Strategic Policy Group; Committee of secretaries on Administration
- Reports to: Home Minister
- Residence: 3, New Moti Bagh, New Delhi
- Seat: Ministry of Home Affairs; North Block, Cabinet Secretariat; Raisina Hill; New Delhi
- Appointer: Appointments Committee of the Cabinet
- Term length: Two years, term can be extended.
- Formation: 1947; 79 years ago
- Salary: ₹225,000 (US$2,400) monthly
- Website: Official Website

The home secretary (ISO: Gṛh Saciv) is the administrative head of the Ministry of Home Affairs. This post is held by a senior IAS officer of the rank of secretary to the Government of India. The current home secretary is Govind Mohan. All central forces including the Central Reserve Police Force, Central Industrial Security Force, Border Security Force and Central Police Organizations are under the home secretary.

As a secretary to the Government of India, the home secretary ranks 23rd on Indian order of precedence.

== Powers, responsibilities and postings ==
The home secretary is the administrative head of the Ministry of Home Affairs, and is the principal adviser to the home minister on all matters of policy and administration within the Home Ministry.

The role of home secretary is as follows:

- To act as the administrative head of the Ministry of Home Affairs. The responsibility in this regard is complete and undivided.
- To act as the chief adviser to the home minister on all aspects of policy and administrative affairs.
- To represent the Ministry of Home Affairs before the Public Accounts Committee of the Parliament of India.
- To act as the first among equals secretaries in the Ministry of Home Affairs.

== Emolument, accommodation and perquisites ==
The home secretary is eligible for a diplomatic passport. The official earmarked residence of the home secretary is 3, New Moti Bagh, New Delhi, a Type-VIII bungalow.

As the home secretary is of the rank of secretary to the Government of India, his/her salary is equivalent to chief secretaries of state governments and to vice chief of army staff/commanders, in the rank of lieutenant general and equivalent ranks in Indian Armed Forces.

Home secretary monthly pay and allowances
Base salary as per 7th Pay Commission (per month)	Pay matrix level	Sources
₹225,000 (US$2,400)	Pay Level 17	

== List of home secretaries ==
Name	Assumed office	Left office	Ref
Govind Mohan	23 August 2024	Incumbent	
Ajay Kumar Bhalla	22 August 2019	22 August 2024	
Rajiv Gauba	31 August 2017	22 August 2019	
Rajiv Mehrishi	31 August 2015	30 August 2017	
L. C. Goyal	5 February 2015	31 August 2015	
Anil Goswami	30 June 2013	4 February 2015	
R. K. Singh	30 June 2011	30 June 2013	
Gopal Krishna Pillai	30 June 2009	30 June 2011	
Madhukar Gupta	31 March 2007	30 June 2009	
Vinod Kumar Duggal	31 March 2005	31 March 2007	
Dhirendra Singh	1 July 2004	31 March 2005	
Anil Baijal	8 February 2004	1 July 2004	
N. Gopalaswami	15 October 2002	8 February 2004	
Kamal Pande	5 May 1999	15 October 2002	
Balmiki Prasad Singh	1 November 1997	4 May 1999	
K. Padmanabhaiah	1 June 1994	31 October 1997	
N. N. Vohra	6 April 1993	31 May 1994	
Madhav Godbole	4 October 1991	23 March 1993	
R. K. Bhargava	12 December 1990	3 October 1991	
Naresh Chandra	21 March 1990	11 December 1990	
Shiromani Sharma	29 December 1989	20 March 1990	
J. A. Kalyankrishnan	17 October 1988	29 December 1989	
C. G. Somiah	1 July 1986	16 October 1988	
R. D. Pradhan	15 January 1985	30 June 1986	
Prem Kumar	6 November 1984	15 January 1985	
M. M. K. Wali	1 March 1984	4 November 1984	
T. N. Chaturvedi	12 August 1981	29 February 1984	
S. M. H. Burney	29 February 1980	12 August 1981	
T. C. A. Srinivasavaradan	31 March 1977	29 February 1980	
S. L. Khurana	23 June 1975	30 March 1977	
Nirmal Kumar Mukarji	4 July 1973	23 June 1975	
Govind Narain	1 January 1971	18 May 1973	
L. P. Singh	18 September 1964	1 January 1971	
V. Vishwanathan	27 November 1961	18 September 1964	
B. N. Jha	15 January 1958	26 November 1961	
A. V. Pai	1 March 1953	14 January 1958	
H. V. R. Iyengar	1 August 1949	28 February 1953	
R. N. Banerjee	5 May 1947	2 July 1949	

== See also ==
- Cabinet Secretary of India
- Secretary of the Research and Analysis Wing
- Foreign Secretary of India
- Defence Secretary of India
- Finance Secretary of India

== Bibliography ==
- Maheshwari, S.R. (2000). Indian Administration (6th ed.). New Delhi: Orient Blackswan Private Ltd. ISBN 9788125019886.
- Laxmikanth, M. (2014). Governance in India (2nd ed.). Noida: McGraw Hill Education. ISBN 978-9339204785.
