= Gopal Krishna Pillai =

Indian civil servant

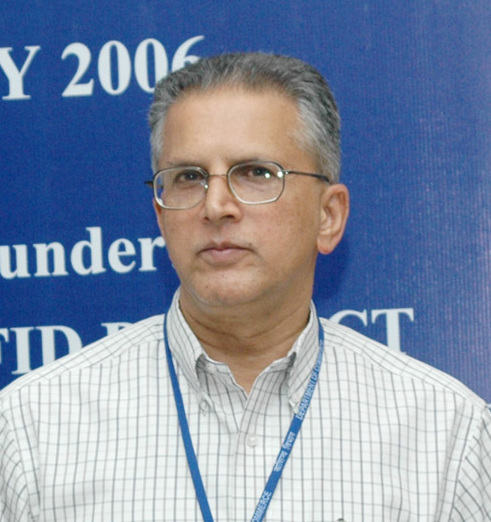

Home Secretary
- In office 30 Jun 2009 – 30 Jun 2011
- Preceded by: Madhukar Gupta
- Succeeded by: R. K. Singh

Personal details
- Born: 30 November 1949 (age 76) Kollam, Kerala
- Spouse: Sudha Pillai
- Education: St. Joseph's College, Bangalore; IIT Madras
- Occupation: Civil Servant (IAS)

Gopal Krishna Pillai or G. K. Pillai (born 30 Nov 1949) is a retired Indian Administrative Service officer and the former Home Secretary in the Government of India. He was born into a Nair family in Kerala. He was educated at Bishop Cotton Boys' School, Bangalore, and at the St. Joseph's College, Bangalore. He then obtained an M.Sc from IIT Madras. He belongs to the Kerala cadre of the 1972 batch of I.A.S.

== Career ==
G.K. Pillai held diverse positions in the state government of Kerala such as:

- District Collector of Kollam from 1982 to 1985
- Special Secretary for Industries, especially the traditional industries of cashew, coir and handlooms
- Secretary of Health
- Principal Secretary to the Chief Minister of Kerala.

== Media spotlight ==
In February 2016, Pillai claimed to media that there was political interference in the controversial Ishrat Jahan case. Pillai's claims were corroborated by another former official in March 2016, bringing the Ishrat Jahan case into media spotlight once again.
