= Deepak Gupta (civil servant) =

Deepak Gupta (born 21 September 1951, Nurpur, Himachal Pradesh) is a former chairman of the Union Public Service Commission.

He is an IAS officer of 1974 batch and an alumnus of the St. Stephens College.

Deepak Gupta is currently the Honorary Director General of National Solar Energy Federation of India (NSEFI). Deepak Gupta, former MNRE Secretary Govt. of India and UPSC Chairman has been a source of Inspiration to NSEFI. He presided over the conceptualization and implementation of India's National Solar Mission which is the basis for the latest ambitious target of 100,000 MW Solar capacity with 40,000 MW Solar Rooftop. He has rendered distinguished services to the country in his long administrative career and held many senior key positions in the Government of India.

Deepak Gupta, Former MNRE Secretary Govt. of India and UPSC Chairman is the Hon. Director General of NSEFI. He retired in 2011 as Secretary, Ministry of New and Renewable energy where he presided over the conceptualization and implementation of India’s National Solar Mission. After retirement he consulted with the world bank and UNIDO and writes on issues of energy and sustainable development. He was Chairman of UPSC from November 2014 to September 2016.

== As an Author ==
Mr Deepak has authored following books

- Small Things Matter - Key to Good Governance. Unique Publishers. 2021. ISBN 978-9391008321.
- The Steel Frame A History Of The IAS. Roli Books. 2019.
