= Purna Chandra Hota =

Purna Chandra Hota (9 September 1938 – 27 December 2020) was an Indian bureaucrat and civil servant. He was married to Bijoylaxmi Hota, a yoga expert and author of several books on yogic therapy. He had three children, Reema Hota Singh, an Indian revenue Service Officer, Prasenjeet Hota, and Reela Hota, an odissi dancer.

== Education and career ==
The oldest son of Banchanidi Hota, an Excise Official, Hota was born and raised in the Indian state of Odisha. He was educated in Ravenshaw College in Cuttack and at the University of Allahabad.

Hota served as lecturer in the Post-Graduate Department of Political Science of Utkal University. He competed in the Indian Administrative Service (I.A.S.) Examination held by the UPSC and was among the first ten candidates in order of merit. Hota was allotted the Odisha Cadre of the Indian Administrative Service in 1962.

Hota studied law in the South Campus Law College of the University of Delhi while serving in the I.A.S.

From 1966 to 1984, he worked for the Government of Odisha in various departments. As the Additional Secretary of Ministry of Labor of the Government of India, he was appointed the Chairman of the Tripartite Committee appointed by Government of India, and empowered to plan a pension scheme for workers, which has been implemented since 1995.

In May 2010, he was appointed by the Government of India as the Chairman of a Committee of Experts, to suggest measures for expeditious disposal of disciplinary and vigilance inquiries.

In August 2012, he was honorarily named Doctor of Letters by Ravenshaw University in recognition of "Outstanding Contribution to Public Service". In July 2013, he was appointed by the Government of Karnataka to recommend measures for reform of the practices and procedures of the Karnataka Public Service Commission.

In 2019, Hota wrote a book on law titled Nuggets of Wisdom- Some path breaking judgements of the Supreme Court, published by Atlantic. Chandra Hota died on 27 December 2020 at the age of 82.

== International delegations ==
- 1982: Member of a Delegation to the World Bank, Washington DC for negotiating a loan for a major river valley project in Odisha
- 1991: Led the Indian delegation to the International Labor Conference at Geneva
- 1991: Member of the Indian delegation to the Asian Productivity Council at Bangkok
- 1992: Led the Indian Delegation to the International Social Security Association at Acapulco, Mexico
- 1995: Member of the Indian delegation to the Eastern Regional Organization of Public administration (EROPA) at Tokyo
- 1995: Member of the Indian delegation to the International Anti-Corruption Conference at Beijing
- 2001: Led a delegation of Union Public Service Commission for Study of Modalities of Recruitment to the Public Service in Singapore and Australia
