= Union Public Service Commission =

Constitutional body in India tasked with recruiting officers for the civil services

- Union Public Service Commission

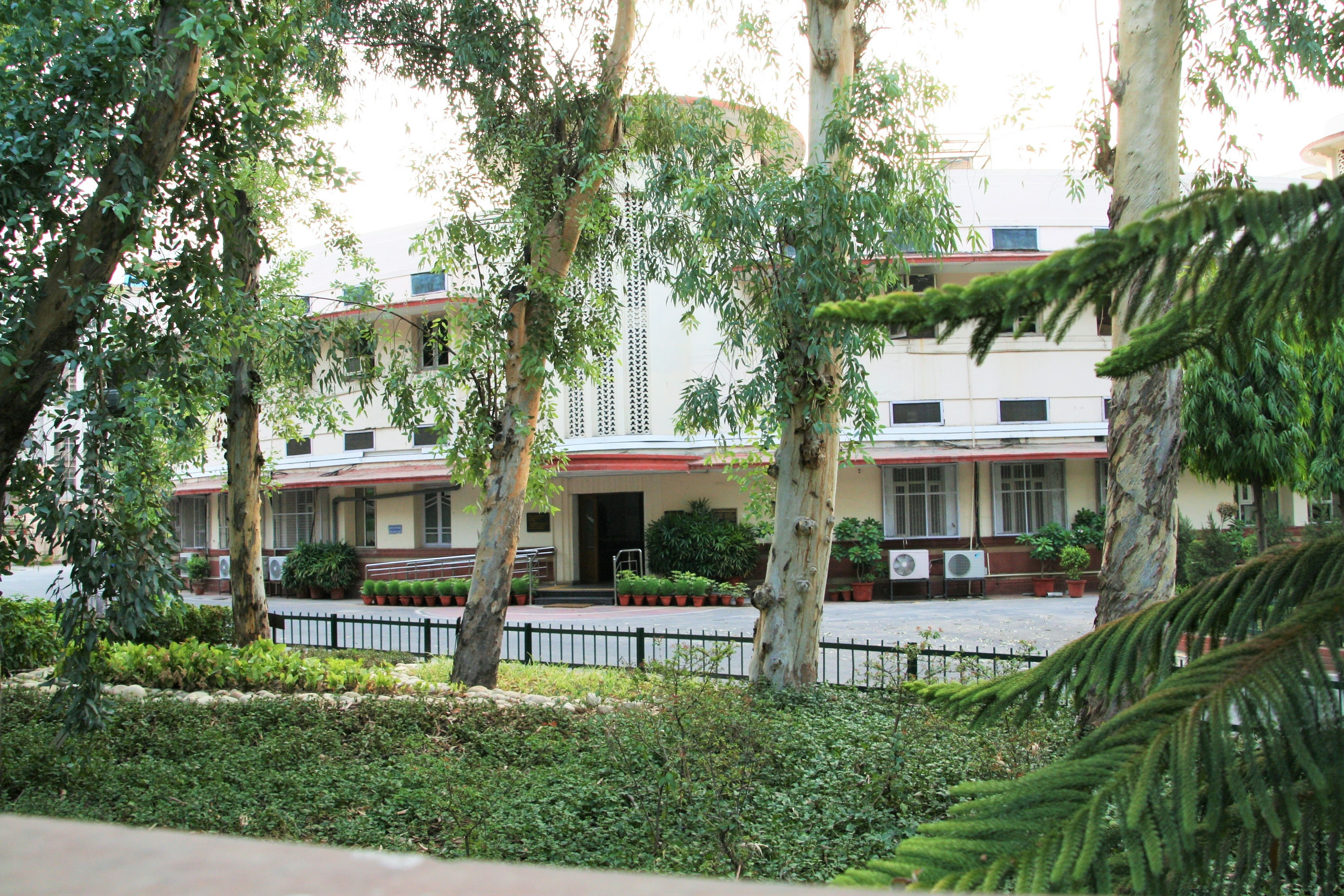

Constitutional body overview
- Formed: 1 October 1926 (100 years ago)
- Jurisdiction: Republic of India
- Headquarters: Dholpur House, Shahjahan Road, New Delhi; 28.6080°N 77.2269°E
- Motto: "सत्यमेव जयते"
- Constitutional body executive: Ajay Kumar (IAS), Chairperson
- Key document: Constitution of India (Article 315)
- Website: upsconline.nic.in www.upsc.gov.in

The Union Public Service Commission (UPSC) is a constitutional body in India tasked with recruiting officers for All India Services and the Central Civil Services (Group A and B) through various standardized examinations. In 2023, 1.3 million applicants competed for just 1,255 positions.

The agency's charter is granted by Part XIV of the Constitution of India, titled Services Under the Union and the States. The commission is mandated by the Constitution for appointments to the services of the Union and All India Services. It is also required to be consulted by the Government in matters relating to appointment, transfer, promotion, and disciplinary matters. The commission reports directly to the President. The commission can advise the Government through the president, although such advice is not binding. Being a constitutional authority, UPSC is amongst the few institutions that function with both autonomy and freedom, along with the country's higher judiciary and lately the Election Commission. The commission is headquartered at Dholpur House in New Delhi, and functions through its secretariat. Established on 1st October 1926 as the Public Service Commission, it was later reconstituted as the Federal Public Service Commission by the Government of India Act 1935, and was later renamed as today's Union Public Service Commission after independence.

== History ==
In 1947, the then deputy prime minister Vallabhbhai Patel called the recruits the "steel frame of India".

The Royal Commission on the Superior Civil Services in India was set up under the chairmanship of Lord Lee of Fareham by the British Government in 1923. With equal numbers of Indian and British members, the commission submitted its report in 1924, recommending the setting up of a Public Service Commission. The Lee Commission proposed that 40% of future entrants should be British, 40% Indians directly recruited, and 20% Indians promoted from the provincial services.

This led to the establishment of the first Public Service Commission on 1 October 1926 under the chairmanship of Sir Ross Barker. A mere limited advisory function was granted to the Public Service Commission, and the leaders of the freedom movement continually stressed this aspect, which then resulted in the setting up of a Federal Public Service Commission under the Government of India Act 1935. The Federal Public Service Commission became the Union Public Service Commission after the country gained independence. It was given a constitutional status under the Constitution of India on 26 January 1950.

== Constitutional status ==
Articles 315 to 323 of Part XIV of the Constitution, titled Services Under the Union and the States, provide for a Public Service Commission for the Union and each state. Accordingly, as per Art. 315, at the Union level, the Union Public Service Commission is envisaged by it. UPSC is amongst the few institutions which function with both autonomy and freedom, along with the country's higher judiciary and lately the Election Commission. The constitutional safeguards for the Commission's independence include security of tenure for its members, protection of its expenses through charges on the Consolidated Fund of India, and restrictions on members accepting further government employment after demitting office, except as expressly permitted by the Constitution.

=== Appointment ===
As per Art. 316, the chairman and other members of the Union Public Service Commission shall be appointed by the president. In case the office of the chairman becomes vacant, the duties shall be performed by one of the other members of the Commission at the appointment of the President.

Also, nearly half of the members of the Commission shall be persons who, at the dates of their respective appointments, have held office for at least ten years either under the Government of India or under the Government of a State. A member of the Union Public Service Commission shall hold office for a term of six years from the date on which they enter upon the office or until they attain the age of sixty-five years, whichever is earlier. Under Art 318, the President is empowered to determine the number of members of the commission and their conditions of service.

As per Art 319, a person who holds office as chairman shall, on the expiration of the term of office, be ineligible for re-appointment to that office. But, a member other than the chairman of the Union Public Service Commission shall be eligible for appointment as the chairman of the Union Public Service Commission, or as the chairman of a State Public Service Commission, but not for any other employment either under the Government of India or under the Government of a State. Also, the chairman of a State Public Service Commission shall be eligible for appointment as the chairman or any other member of the Union Public Service Commission.

==== Expenses ====
As per Art. 322, the expenses of the Union Public Service Commission, including any salaries, allowances, and pensions payable to or in respect of the members or staff of the commission, shall be charged on the Consolidated Fund of India.

==== Extension of functions ====
As per Art. 321, an Act made by Parliament may provide for the exercise of additional functions by the Union Public Service Commission w.r.t. Services of the Union.

=== Functions ===
As per Art. 320, it shall be the duty of the Union Public Service Commission to conduct examinations for appointments to the services of the Union. It shall also assist two or more states, if requested so, in framing and operating schemes of joint recruitment for any services.

=== Removal and suspension ===
As per Art. 317, the chairman or any other member of a Public Service Commission shall only be removed from their office by order of the president on the ground of "misbehavior" after the Supreme Court, on a reference being made to it by the president, has, on inquiry, reported that the chairman or such other member ought to be removed. The president may suspend the chairman or other members of the commission until the report of the Supreme Court is received.

=== Reporting ===
As per Art. 323, it will be the duty of the Union Commission to annually present a report to the President on the work done by the commission. On receipt of such report, the president shall present a copy before each House of Parliament, together with a memorandum, if any, explaining the reasons why he did not accept the advice of the commission.

The president may also remove the chairman or other member of the commission if he/she/they:

- is/are adjudged an insolvent; or
- engage(s) during their term of office in any paid employment outside the duties of their office; or
- is/are, in the opinion of the president, unfit to continue in office because of infirmity of mind or body.
- The chairman or any other member cannot hold an office of profit or otherwise they shall be deemed to be guilty of misbehavior.

The Union Public Service Commission shall be consulted on all matters relating to:

- methods of recruitment to civil services and for civil posts
- making appointments to civil services and posts
- making promotions and transfers from one service to another
- The suitability of candidates for such appointments, promotions, or transfers
- On all disciplinary matters against a civil servant serving in a civil capacity, including memorials or petitions relating to such matters.
- On any claim by or in respect of a person who is serving or has served in a civil capacity, that any costs incurred in defending legal proceedings instituted against him in respect of acts done or purporting to be done in the execution of their duty should be paid out of the Consolidated Fund of India.
- On any claim for the award of a pension in respect of injuries sustained by a person while serving in a civil capacity, and any question as to the amount of such award. It shall be the duty of a Union Public Service Commission to advise on any matter referred to them; provided that the President has not made any regulations specifying the matters in which it shall not be necessary for the Union Public Service Commission to be consulted.

== Organizational structure ==
The Commission consists of the chairman and other members appointed by the President of the Republic of India. Usually, the Commission consists of 9 to 11 members, including the chairman. Every member holds office for a term of six years or until he attains the age of sixty-five years, whichever is earlier. The terms and conditions of service of the chairman and members of the commission are governed by the Union Public Service Commission (Members) Regulations, 1969.

The chairman and any other member of the commission can submit their resignation at any time to the President of India. They may be removed from their office by the President of India on the ground of misbehavior (only if an inquiry of such misbehavior is made and upheld by the Supreme Court) or if he is adjudged insolvent, or engages during the term of office in any paid employment outside the duties of their office, or in the opinion of the president unfit to continue in office because of the infirmity of mind or body.

=== Secretariat ===
The commission is serviced by a Secretariat headed by a Secretary with four Additional Secretaries, several Joint Secretaries, Deputy Secretaries, and other supporting staff. The secretariat, for administrative purposes, is further divided into divisions, each undertaking having a specific responsibility:

- Administration: Administers the Secretariat as well as looks after personal matters of the Chairman/Members and other Officers/Staff of the commission.
- All India Services: Recruitment to All India Services is done either by direct recruitment, through Civil Services Examination or by promotion from the State Service. The AIS Branch handles the promotions of State Service officers to the IAS, IPS and IFS. It also handles policy matters relating to All India Services and amendments in the 'Promotion Regulations' of respective services.
- Appointments: It carries out appointments to central services based on Promotion (based on proposals from various Ministries/Departments/Union Territories and from certain local bodies) and by the means of Deputation and Absorption.
- Examinations: It carries out merit-based selection and recommendation of candidates through various examinations such as the Engineering Services Examination, Combined Medical Services Examination, Defence Services Examination, Civil Services Examination, etc., to Group A and Group B Services of the Government of India.
- General: Primarily deals with day-to-day housekeeping work for the Commission, such as arrangements and facilitation for the conduct of Examinations by the UPSC, printing the Annual Report, etc.
- Recruitment: This branch carries out Direct Recruitment (out of the 3 possible mechanisms of: 'direct recruitment', 'recruitment by promotion' and 'recruitment by transfer and permanent absorption') by selection to all Group `A’ and certain Group `B’ posts of the services of the Union (including some Union Territories). These recruitments are done either by selection (interview) or through competitive examination.
- Recruitment Rules: The commission is mandated under Art. 320 of the Constitution of India, read along the UPSC (Exemption from Consultation) Regulations, 1958, to advise on framing and amending of Recruitment and Service Rules for various Group A and Group B posts in the Government of India, and certain autonomous organizations like EPFO, ESIC, DJB, NDMC & Municipal Corporations(s) of Delhi. This Branch carries out this responsibility by facilitating the Ministries / Departments / UT Administrations / Autonomous Organisations in this regard.
- Services I: Handles disciplinary cases received from various Ministries/Departments and State Governments for the advice of the commission, as required under Article 320 (3)(c).
- Services II: Handles all other cases that the 'Services I' branch doesn't. It compiles the Annual Report. Also, it coordinates visits of foreign delegations, correspondence with foreign countries, and hosting of international events concerning Public Service Commissions, including the SAARC Member States.

=== Present members ===
The institute currently has nine members, including the chairperson, compared to its sanctioned strength of ten members.

Current members of the Commission
Name	Service	Position	Term started	Term end
Ajay Kumar	IAS	Chairperson	15 May 2025	1 October 2027
Lieutenant General Raj Shukla (Retd.)	Indian Army	Member	18 July 2022	26 March 2027
Suman Sharma	IRS	Member	25 May 2023	24 May 2029
Bidyut Bihari Swain	IAS	Member	1 June 2023	4 September 2028
Sanjay Verma	IFS	Member	1 February 2024	27 January 2030
Dr. Dinesh Dasa	Academician	Member	29 September 2023	28 September 2029
Sheel Vardhan Singh	IPS	Member	15 January 2024	25 August 2028
Sujata Chaturvedi	IAS	Member	1 May 2025	18 June 2030
Anuradha Prasad	IDAS	Member	2 May 2025	22 January 2029

== UPSC Museum ==
The Museum Building is located within the premises of the UPSC, the Dholpur House, Shahjahan Road, New Delhi. There prevailed for a long time a feeling that an institution like the Union Public Service Commission that has in its possession a rich treasure of archival material: original Pamphlets, Documents, reports, and other Records not easily accessible to the public, should have a Museum providing the public a window to have a vision of the great journey of this august institution. Accordingly, the Union Public Service Commission decided to set up a museum where such materials could be aesthetically displayed for discerning visitors.

== See also ==
- List of Public Service Commissions in India
