= Civil Services of India =

Indian Civil Services

In India, the Civil Service is the collection of civil servants of the government who constitute the permanent executive branch of the country. This includes career officials in the All India Services, the Central Civil Services, and various State Civil Services. The civil service forms the basis of the Government, without which there is no administration. They act as the main channel to articulate people's needs and implement government policies on the ground. They provide the necessary inputs, identify policy areas, analyse various alternatives, offer multiple solutions to societal issues, and give robust advice to the ministers, policy makers, and legislators.

As of 2010, there were 6.4 million government employees in India at all levels (Group A to D) within the central and state governments. The services with the most personnel are with the Central Secretariat Service (Note: As on year 2021, CSS cadre has a total strength of 12,500 members and is controlled by DOPT, Ministry of Personnel GOI. According to a PTI report published by ThePrint on 7 March 2024, the sanctioned strength of the CSS officers is 13,016.) and Indian Revenue Service (IT and C&CE). (Note: The Indian Revenue Service is not one entity and not one service. The two independent branches are controlled by two separate statutory bodies, the Central Board of Direct Taxes (CBDT) and the Central Board of Indirect Taxes and Customs (CBIC). The IT and C&CE also have two different independent service associations. The total members are 4192 (Income Tax) and 5583 (Customs and Indirect Taxes).)

Civil servants in a personal capacity are paid from the Civil List. Article 311 of the Constitution of India protects civil servants from politically motivated or vindictive action. Senior civil servants may be called to account by the Parliament. The civil service system in India is rank-based and does not follow the tenets of the position-based civil services.

== History ==
If a responsible government is to be established in India, there will be a far greater need than is even dreamt of at present for persons to take part in public affairs in the legislative assemblies and elsewhere, and for this reason, the more Indians we can employ in the public service, the better. Moreover, it would lessen the burden of Imperial responsibilities if a body of capable Indian administrators could be produced.

— Regarding the importance of Indianising Civil Services, Montagu–Chelmsford Reforms

The present civil services of India are mainly based on the pattern of the former Indian Civil Service of British India. During the British Raj, Warren Hastings laid the foundation of the civil service and Charles Cornwallis reformed, modernised, and rationalised it. Hence, He is known as 'the Father of civil service in India'.

Cornwallis introduced two divisions of the Indian Civil Service—covenanted and uncovenanted. The covenanted civil service consisted of only Europeans (i.e., British personnel) occupying the higher posts in the government. The uncovenanted civil service was solely introduced to facilitate the entry of Indians at the lower rung of the administration.

With the passing of the Government of India Act 1919, the Imperial Services headed by the Secretary of State for India were split into two—the All India Services and the Central Services.

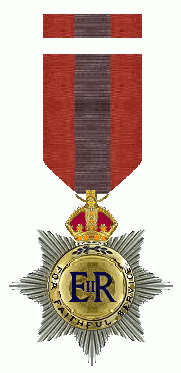
Imperial Service Order were awarded to those who were working in the administrative, clerical, and technical branches of the civil service.

The All India and Central Services (Group A) were designated as Central Superior Services as early as 1924. From 1924 to 1934, the administration of India consisted of 10 All India Services (including Indian Political Service, Indian Education Service, Indian Medical Service) and 5 central departments, all under the control of the Secretary of State for India, and 3 central departments under joint Provincial and Imperial Control.

During the British Raj, the Chairperson of the Railway Board was the highest paid civil servant until 1959 and V. P. Menon became the highest-ranking civil servant as the Political Reforms Commissioner to the British Viceroy.

=== Women in civil service during British India ===
No women were ever formally recruited into the Imperial Civil Service between 1858 and 1947. The service was exclusively male until its final years. Women were appointed only at the level of clerks (as typists and lowly clerical assistants), concentrated in the lower echelons of the uncovenanted civil service.

Women were recruited to Imperial Secretariat Service (Class II) but were disqualified for higher posts in the various departments under the control of the Governor-General of India like Imperial Secretariat Service (Class I). In the Imperial Police, there were no women who were recruited as its members. Also, for the Imperial Forest Service, there were no women recruited as its members.

=== Medals, honors, and awards in civil service during British India ===
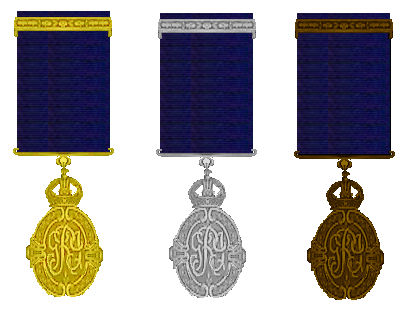
The highest and most prestigious decoration given to civil servants and other civilians by the British government in India was the Kaisar-i-Hind Gold Medal for Public Service in India.

During British rule in India, civil servants were recipients of orders of chivalry namely - Order of the Indian Empire, Order of the British Empire, Imperial Service Order, Order of the Star of India and Knight Bachelor. They were also awarded the title of honor Rai Bahadur, civil medals such as Kaisar-i-Hind Medal, Delhi Durbar Medal (1903) and Delhi Durbar Medal (1911).

=== 21st century ===
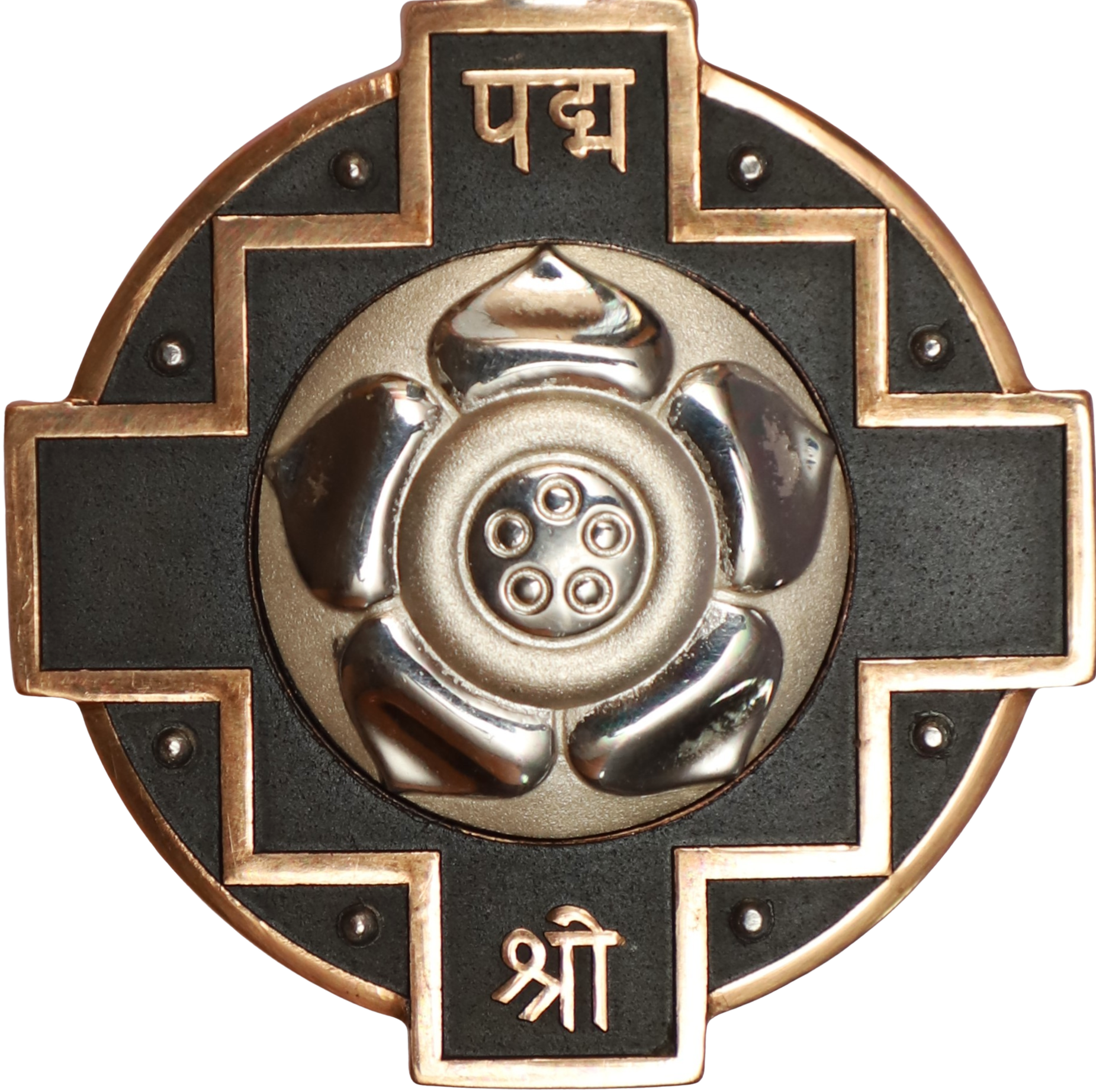
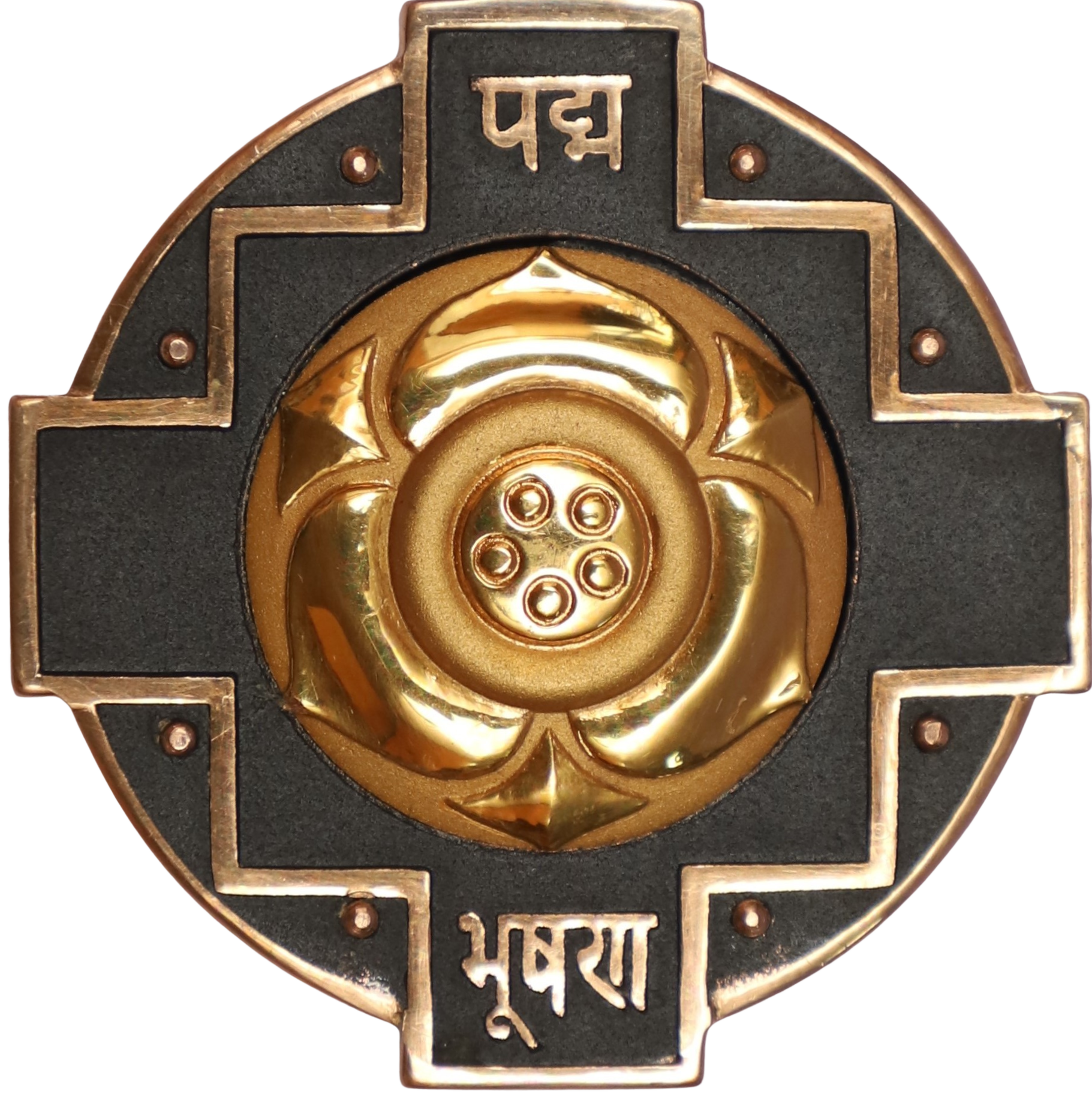
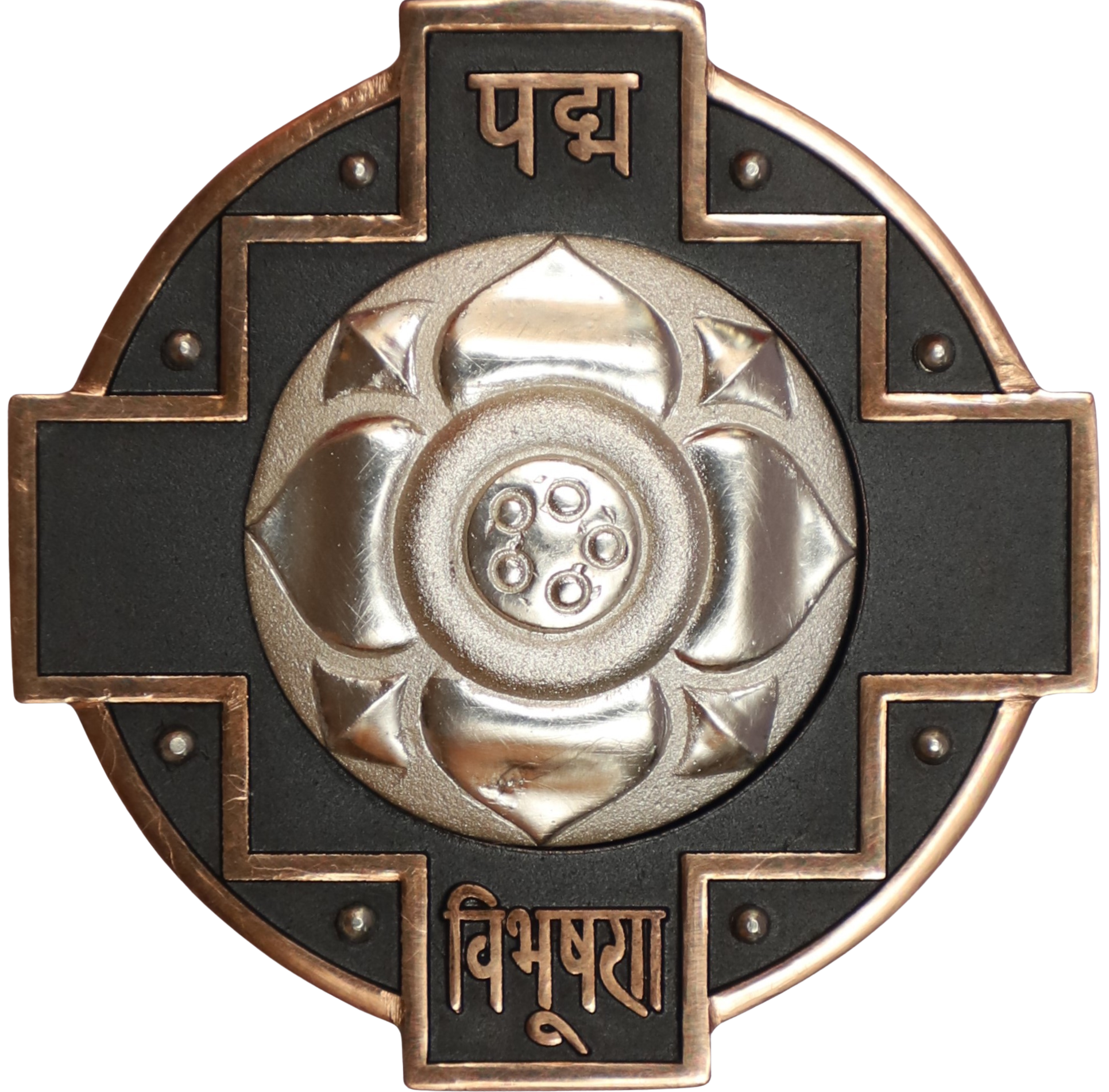
Padma Shri, Padma Bhushan and Padma Vibhushan civilian awards in recognition for civil service category.

The present modern civil service was formed after the partition of India in 1947. It was Sardar Patel's vision that the civil service should strengthen cohesion and national unity. The values of integrity, impartiality, and merit remain the guiding principles of the Indian civil services.

By the early 21st century, especially in Indian media, Indian civil servants were regularly colloquially called 'babus' (as in 'the rule of babus'), while Indian bureaucracy is called 'babudom'.

The Ministry of Personnel, Public Grievances and Pensions, located in New Delhi, is unofficially the 'Ministry of Civil Services'. The Ministry is responsible for training, reforms, and pensions for the civil service system in India. A significant number of Indian civil servants have been recipients of the Padma Shri, Padma Bhushan, and Padma Vibhushan civilian awards in recognition of their contributions to public administration and governance.

== Framework, provision and principles ==
=== Constitutional provision ===
The Constitution, under Article 312 gives authority to the Rajya Sabha (the upper house of Parliament) to set up new branches of the All-India Services with a two-thirds majority vote. The Indian Administrative Service, Indian Police Service, and Indian Forest Service have been established under this constitutional provision.

=== Guiding principles ===
==== Values ====
A member of the civil service in discharge of his/her functions is to be guided by maintaining absolute integrity, allegiance to the constitution and the law of the nation, patriotism, national pride, devotion to duty, honesty, impartiality and transparency.

==== Code of ethics ====
The Government of India promotes values and a certain standard of ethics of requiring and facilitating every civil servant:

- To discharge official duty with responsibility, honesty, accountability, without discrimination, and with political, religious, and social neutrality.
- To ensure effective management, leadership development, and personal growth.
- To avoid misuse of official position or information.
- To serve as instruments of good governance and foster social and economic development.

== Purpose, role, and responsibilities ==
An Indian diplomatic passport (left) and an official passport generally issued to civil servants. As opposed to the deep blue passport issued to ordinary Indian citizens, the diplomatic passport is maroon with the gold text 'Diplomatic Passport' printed on it in English and Hindi.

The responsibility of the civil services is to run the administration of India. The country is managed through several central government agencies in accordance with policy directions from the ministries. Civil servants are the actual makers of Indian law and policy. They work on behalf of the elected government and cannot publicly show their disinterest or disapproval for it. It is mandatory for them to form certain rules and policies according to the government's views and interests. However, they cannot be removed by any state or central government, but can only be retired.

Among the members of the civil services are administrators in the central government and state government; emissaries in the foreign missions/embassies; tax collectors and revenue commissioners; civil service commissioned police officers; permanent representative(s) and employees in the United Nations and its agencies; and chairmen, managing directors, and full-time functional directors and members of the board of various public-sector undertakings, enterprises, corporations, banks, and financial institutions. Civil servants are employed by various agencies of India and can also be appointed as advisors, special duty officers, or private secretaries to ministers of the Union and the State Government.

== Head of the Civil Services ==
The highest-ranking civil servant in India is the Cabinet Secretary, who functions from Cabinet Secretariat. He is the ex-officio Chairman of the Civil Services Board; the chief of the Indian Administrative Service and head of all civil services under the rules of business of the Government of India. He also holds the 11th position in the Order of Precedence of India. The position holder is accountable for ensuring that the Civil Service is equipped with the skills and capability to meet the everyday challenges it faces and that civil servants work in a fair and decent environment.

== Recruitment ==
The Civil Services Board is responsible for the entry-level recruitment and subsequent job promotions below the rank of Joint Secretary to the Government of India. The recruits are university graduates or above, selected through the following rigorous system of specialisation-based examinations for recruitment into respective specialised departments:

- Civil Services Examination (Civil Service)
- National Defence Academy and Naval Academy Examination (Defence Service)
- Indian Cost Accounts Service (ICoAS) Examination (Civil Service)
- Combined Defence Service Examination (Defence Service)
- Combined Geo-Scientist Examination (Natural Resource)
- Engineering Services Examination (Civil Service)
- Indian Economic Service/Indian Statistical Service Examination (I.E.S./I.S.S. Exam) (Civil Service)
- Combined Medical Services Examination (Medical)
- Central Armed Police Forces - Assistant Commandants Examination (CAPF - AC Exam) of Union Public Service Commission (UPSC) for Group A posts (Civil Service)

=== Promotions and appointments to higher ranks ===
All appointments in the rank of Joint Secretary to Government of India and above, other major appointments, empanelment, and extension of tenure are done by the Appointments Committee of the Cabinet. Lower appointments are handled by the Civil Services Board.

=== Central Administrative Tribunal ===
For settling various administrative disputes, the Central Administrative Tribunal (CAT) can be approached. For instance, citizens can approach CAT to obtain permission to sue corrupt or inept civil servants, and civil servants can approach CAT for unfair dismissal.

== Civil Services Day ==
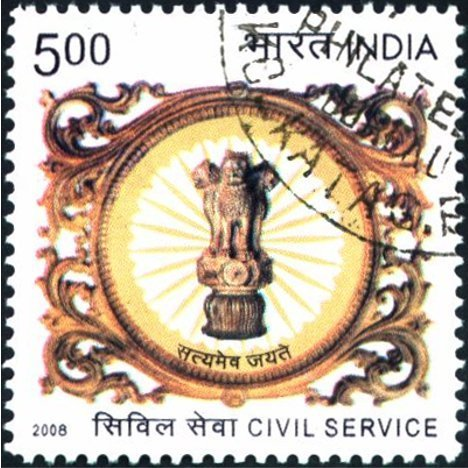
A commemorative stamp released at the inaugural session of the 3rd Civil Services Day, in New Delhi on April 21, 2008.

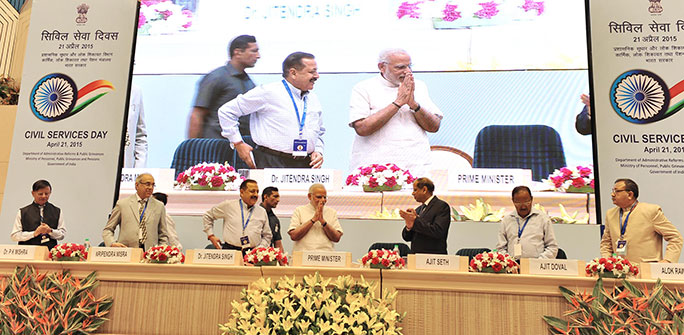
Prime Minister Narendra Modi on Civil Services Day in year 2015

The Civil Service Day is celebrated on 21 April every year. The purpose for this day is to rededicate and recommit themselves to the cause of the people. It is observed by all Civil Services. This day gives civil servants the opportunity for introspection and thinking about future strategies to deal with the challenges being posed by the changing times.

This date (21 April) was chosen to commemorate the day in 1947 when Sardar Vallabhbhai Patel, the first Home Minister of Independent India, addressed the probationers of Administrative Services Officers. On this occasion, all officers of the Central and State Governments are honoured for excellence in public administration by the Prime Minister of India. The 'Prime Minister's Awards for Excellence in Public Administration' is presented in three categories. Under this scheme of awards instituted in 2006, all the officers, individually or as a group or as an organisation, are eligible. The award includes a medal, scroll, and a cash amount of ₹100,000 (US$1,000). In case of a group, the total award money is ₹500,000 (US$5,200) subject to a maximum of ₹100,000 (US$1,000) per person. For an organisation the cash amount is limited to ₹500,000 (US$5,200).

== Civil Services - All India and Central ==
The Union Civil Services of India can be classified into two types - the All India Civil Services and the Central Civil Services (Group A).

- Additionally, the officers from the State Civil Services cadre can seek deployment with the Government of India cadre for the Union Civil Services jobs.

=== All India Services ===
All appointments to All India Civil Services are made by the President of India.

- Indian Administrative Service
- Indian Forest Service
- Indian Police Service

=== Central Services ===
==== Group A ====
The Central Civil Services (Group A) are concerned with the administration of the Union Government. All appointments to Central Civil Services (Group A) are made by the President of India.

- Archaeological Service, Group 'A' (Civil Service)
- Border Roads Engineering Services (Engineering)
- Botanical Survey of India, Group 'A' (Natural Resource)
- Central Architects Service, Group 'A' (Engineering)
- Central Engineering Service, Group 'A' (Engineering)
- Central Electrical and Mechanical Engineering Service, Group 'A' (Engineering)
- Indian Naval Armament Service, Group 'A' (Engineering)
- Central Geological Service (CGS), Group 'A' (Natural Resource)
- Central Health Service, Group 'A' (Medical)
- Central Revenues Chemical Service, Group 'A' (Civil Service)
- Central Secretariat Service (Civil Service)
  - (a) Selection Grade
  - (b) Grade I
- General Central Service, Group 'A' (Civil Service)
- Indian Audit and Accounts Service, Group 'A' (Civil Service)
- Indian Cost Accounts Service, Group 'A' (Civil Service)
- Indian Corporate Law Service (Civil Service)
- Indian Defence Accounts Service (Civil Service)
- Indian Defence Service of Engineers (IDSE), Group 'A'
- Indian Foreign Service, Group 'A' (Civil Service)
- Indian Meteorological Service, Group 'A' (Natural Resource)
- Indian Information Service, Group 'A' (Civil Service)
- Indian Postal Service, Group 'A' (Civil Service)
- Indian Naval Material Management Service (Engineering)
- Indian Posts and Telegraphs Traffic Service, Group 'A' (Civil Service)
- Indian Revenue Service (Civil Service) -
  - (a) Customs Branch (Indian Customs Service, Group 'A')
  - (b) Central Excise Branch (Central Excise Service, Group 'A')
  - (c) Income Tax Branch (Income Tax Service, Group 'A')
- Indian Trade Service, Group 'A' (Civil Service)
- Indian Salt Service, Group 'A' (Engineering)
- Mercantile Marine Training Ship Service, Group 'A' (Civil Service)
- Directorate General of Mines Safety, Group 'A' (Medical)
- Overseas Communications Service, Group 'A' (Civil Service)
- Survey of India Service, Group 'A' (Engineering)
- Indian Telecommunication Service, Group 'A' (Civil Service)
- Indian Radio Regulatory Service, Group 'A' (Engineering)
- Zoological Survey of India, Group 'A' (Natural Resource)
- Indian Ordnance Factories Service (IOFS) (Civil Service)/(Engineering)
- Indian Ordnance Factories Health Service (IOFHS) (Medical)
- Indian Frontier Administrative Service, Group 'A' (Civil Service)
- Research and Analysis Service, Group 'A' (Intelligence)
- Indian Railways Management Service
- Indian Railway Health Services (Civil Service)
- Railway Protection Force (Civil Service)
  - (a) Grade I
  - (b) Grade II
- Central Legal Service (Grades I, II, III, and IV) (Law)
- Railway Inspectorate Service, Group 'A' (Civil Service)
- Delhi, Andaman and Niccobar Island Civil Services, Grade I. (Civil Service)
- Indian Inspection Service, Group 'A' (Engineering)
- Indian Salt Service(Civil Services )
- Indian Supply Service, Group 'A' (Engineering)
- Indian Statistical Service (Civil Service)
- Indian Economic Service (Civil Service)
- Indian Enterprise Development Service
- Telegraph Traffic Service, Group 'A' (Civil Service)
- Central Water Engineering Service, Group 'A' (Engineering)
- Central Power Engineering Service, Group 'A' (Engineering)
- Indian Civil Accounts Service (Civil Service)
- Central Labour Service, Group 'A' (Civil Service)
- Central Engineering Service (Roads), Group 'A' (Engineering)
- Indian Posts and Telegraphs Accounts and Finance Service, Group 'A' (Civil Service)
- Indian Broadcasting (Engineers) Service (Engineering)
- Armed Forces Headquarters Civil Services, Group 'A' (Civil Service)
- Central Secretariat Official Language Service, Group 'A' (Civil Service)
- Indian Skill Development Service

==== Group B ====
For Group B central civil service posts, the Combined Graduate Level Examination (CGLE) is conducted by the Staff Selection Commission (SSC). (Note: The Schedule of Central Civil Services for Group 'B'. The complete list as per Department of Personnel & Training, Ministry of Personnel, Public Grievances and Pensions, Govt. of India) All appointments to Group B are made by the authorities specified by a general or special order of the President.

- Armed Forces Headquarters Civil Services (Civil Service)
- Botanical Survey of India, Group 'B' (Natural Resource)
- Central Electrical Engineering Service, Group 'B' (Engineering)
- Central Engineering Service, Group 'B' (Engineering)
- Central Excise Service, Group 'B' (Civil Service)
- Central Health Service, Group 'B' (Medical)
- Central Power Engineering Service, Group 'B' (Engineering)
- Central Secretariat Official Language Service, Group 'B' (Civil Service)
- Central Secretariat Service, Group 'B' (Section and Assistant Section Grade officers only) (Civil Service)
- Central Secretariat Stenographers’ Service, (Grade I, Grade II, and Selection Grade officers only) (Civil Service)
- Customs Appraisers Service, Group 'B'- (Principal Appraisers and Head Appraisers) (Civil Service)
- Customs Preventive Service, Group 'B' – (Chief Inspectors) (Civil Service)
- Defence Secretariat Service (Civil Service)
- DANIAS, Grade II (Civil Service)
- DANIPS, Grade II (Civil Service)
- Geological Survey of India, Group 'B' (Natural Resource)
- Indian Foreign Service, Group 'B' - (General Cadre, Grade I and General Cadre, Grade II only) (Civil Service)
- Indian Posts and Telegraphs Accounts and Finance Service, Group 'B' Telecommunication Wing (Civil Service).
- Indian Posts & Telegraphs Accounts & Finance Service, Postal Wing, Group 'B' (Civil Service)
- Income Tax Service, Group 'B' (Civil Service)
- Indian Salt Service, Group 'B' (Engineering)
- India Meteorological Service, Group 'B' (Natural Resource)
- Survey of India, Group 'B' (Engineering)
- Postal Superintendents’ Service, Group 'B' (Civil Service)
- Postmasters’ Service, Group 'B' (Civil Service)
- Railway Board Secretariat Service, Group 'B' (Civil Service)
- Telecommunication Engineering Service, Group 'B' (Engineering)
- Telegraphs Traffic Service, Group 'B' (Civil Service)
- Zoological Survey of India, Group 'B' (Natural Resource)

== Civil Services - State Civil Services ==
The State Civil Services examinations and recruitment are conducted by the individual states' public service commissions in India. These services are feeder services of All India Services. All appointments to State Services (Group A) are made by the Governors of States.

=== Group A ===
==== State Civil Service (Executive Branch) or State Administrative Service ====
Each state and union territory in India has its own State Civil Service, which is responsible for various administrative functions, including the implementation of government policies, maintenance of law and order, revenue administration, and development activities within its respective jurisdiction. The officers of the State Civil Service (Executive Branch) or State Administrative Service are recruited through state-specific examinations conducted by the respective state public service commissions. Such officers in India are state civil servants posted as Deputy Collector or equivalent rank in the concerned state government. They belong to Group A gazetted rank and are part of state civil services of India. The officers of the following state civil services cadre are later promoted to Indian Administrative Service and hence conceived as a feeder service for the Indian Administrative Service in the respective state cadre.

Andhra Pradesh Civil Service (Executive Branch); Arunachal Pradesh Civil Service (Executive Branch); Assam Civil Service (Executive Branch); Bihar Administrative Service; Goa Civil Service (Executive Branch); Maharashtra Public Service Commission Civil Service (Executive Branch); Madhya Pradesh Civil Service (Executive Branch); Gujarat Administrative Service; Haryana Civil Service (Executive Branch); Himachal Pradesh Administrative Service; Chhattisgarh Civil Service (Executive Branch); Jharkhand Administrative Service; Jammu and Kashmir Administrative Service / JKAS (General )& JKAS (Finance)	Karnataka Administrative Service; Kerala Administrative Service; Manipur Civil Service (Executive Branch); Mizoram Civil Service (Executive Branch); Meghalaya Civil Service (Executive Branch); Nagaland Civil Service (Executive Branch); Tripura Civil Service (Executive Branch); Odisha Administrative Service; Provincial Civil Service (Executive Branch) of Uttar Pradesh; Punjab Civil Service (Executive Branch); Rajasthan Administrative Service; Sikkim Civil Service (Executive Branch); Telangana Civil Service (Executive Branch); Tamil Nadu Civil Service (Executive Branch); Tripura Civil Service (Executive Branch); West Bengal Civil Service (Executive Branch)

All State Engineering Services officers are Group A gazetted officers.

==== State Forest Service (Natural Resource) ====
All State Forest Services of the rank of Assistant Conservator of Forest(ACF) are Group A gazetted officers under state natural resource services. The officers of this state natural resource services are later promoted to the Indian Forest Service after 8 years of Service.

==== State Police Service (Civil Service) ====
All State Police Services of the rank of Deputy Superintendent of Police/Assistant Commissioner of Police/Assistant Commandant are Group 'B' Officers and is included under state civil services. The officers of the following state civil services are later promoted to Indian Police Service.

Andhra Pradesh State Police Service (APPS); Arunachal Pradesh Police Service (APPS); Assam Police Service (APS); Bihar Police Service (BPS); Goa Police Service (GPS); Maharashtra Police Service (MPS); Madhya Pradesh Police Service (MPPS); Gujarat Police Service (GPS); Haryana Police Service (HPS); Himachal Pradesh Police Service (HPPS); Jharkhand Police Service (JPS); Kashmir Police Service (KPS); Karnataka State Police Service (KSPS)	Kerala Police Service (KPS); Manipur Police Service (MPS); Mizoram Police Service (MPS); Meghalaya Police Service (MPS); Nagaland Police Service (NPS); Odisha Police Service (OPS); Provincial Police Service (Uttar Pradesh) (PPS); Punjab Police Service (PPS); Rajasthan Police Service (RPS); Sikkim Police Service (SPS); Telangana Police Service (TSPS); Tamil Nadu Police Service (TNPS); Tripura Police Service(TPS); Uttarakhand Police Service (UPS); West Bengal Police Service (WBPS)

=== Group B ===
The state civil services (Group B) deal with subjects such as land revenue, agriculture, forests, education, etc. The officers are recruited by different States through the respective State Public Service Commissions and appointed by the Governor of that state.

- Sub Divisional Officer (S.D.O.) of various departments (Civil Service)
- Assistant Registrar Cooperative Societies (Civil Service)
- Block Development Officer (Civil Service)
- District Employment Officer (D.E.O.) (Civil Service)
- District Food and Supplies Controller/Officer (D.F.S.O.) (Civil Service)
- District Treasury Officer (S.T.O.) (Civil Service)
- District Welfare Officer (D.W.O.) (Civil Service)
- Excise and Taxation Officer (E.T.O.) (Civil Service)
- Tehsildar/Talukadar/Assistant Collector (Civil Service)
- Forest Range Officer (F.R.O.) (Natural Resource)
- Any other Class-I/Class-II service notified as per rules by the concerned State, i.e., officers, lecturers, assistants, associate professors, or principals of Government Degree Colleges, Class I (Civil Service/Academia)

== Judicial and Legal Services - Union and States ==
All India Judicial Service, All India Legal Service, State Regional Legal Service, Central Legal Service and State Legal Service are equivalent to civil services and defence services. Their appointment is made by the Governor of respective states after the consultation/approval of the respective states' High Courts and President of India in case the appointment is made for Supreme Court of India and central government establishments.

== Critique ==
=== Criticism ===
==== Poor performance on international ratings ====
We estimate that if India were to pursue civil service reforms and reach the Asian average on government effectiveness, it could add 0.9 percentage points annually to per capita GDP... Institutional quality is a crucial driver of economic performance.

— Goldman Sachs report

Professor Bibek Debroy and Laveesh Bhandari asserted in their book Corruption in India: The DNA and RNA that public officials in India are misappropriating as much as 1.26 per cent of the GDP or ₹921 billion (US$9.6 billion) through corruption.

A 2009 survey of the leading economies of Asia, revealed Indian bureaucracy to be not only the least efficient among Singapore, Hong Kong, Thailand, South Korea, Japan, Malaysia, Taiwan, Vietnam, China, Philippines and Indonesia, but also that working with India's civil servants was a "slow and painful" process.

A 2012 study by the Hong Kong-based Political and Economic Risk Consultancy ranked and rated Indian bureaucracy as the worst in Asia with a 9.21 rating out of 10. According to the study, India's inefficient and corrupt bureaucracy was responsible for most of the complaints that business executives have had about the country.

A 2013 EY (Ernst & Young) Study reports the industries most vulnerable to corruption are: Infrastructure & Real Estate, Metals & Mining, Aerospace & Defence, and Power & Utilities.

==== Inefficiency and misalignment with strategic national goals ====
The IAS is hamstrung by political interference, outdated personnel procedures, and a mixed record on policy implementation, and it needs urgent reform. The Indian government should reshape recruitment and promotion processes, improve performance-based assessment of individual officers, and adopt safeguards that promote accountability while protecting bureaucrats from political meddling.

— The Indian Administrative Service Meets Big Data, Carnegie Endowment for International Peace

==== Institutionalised corruption ====
A paper prepared in 2012 by the Ministry of Personnel, Public Grievances and Pensions states that corruption is prevalent at all levels in civil services and it is institutionalised.

==== Bribery ====
A 2005 study done by the Transparency International in India found that more than 92% of the people had firsthand experience of paying bribes or peddling influence to get services performed in a public office. Taxes and bribes are common between state borders; Transparency International estimates that truckers annually pay ₹222 crore (US$23 million) in bribes. There have been several cases of collusion involving officials of the Income Tax Department of India for preferential tax treatment and relaxed prosecutions in exchange for bribes.

==== Criminalisation ====
In 2011, over a period of the preceding three years, more than 450 chargesheets for criminal cases of corruption were filed, and a total of 943 corruption cases were at different stages of investigation by CBI against civil servants.

==== Misappropriation of funds ====
₹1 lakh crore (US$10 billion) losses through corruption, waste, and fraud occurred from the government's National Rural Health Mission healthcare programme, several of the arrested high-level public servants died under mysterious circumstances, including one in prison.

==== Tendering processes and awarding contracts ====
World Bank report stated that the aid programmes are beset by corruption, bad administration, and under-payments. As an example, the report cites that only 40% of grain handed out for the poor reaches its intended target. The World Bank study finds that the public distribution programmes and social spending contracts have proven to be a waste due to corruption.

A 2006 report stated that the state-funded construction activities, such as road building were dominated by construction mafias, consisting of cabals of corrupt public works officials, materials suppliers, politicians and construction contractors.

==== Theft of state property ====
Corrupt officials steal the state property. In cities and villages throughout India, groups of municipal and other government officials, elected politicians, judicial officers, real estate developers, and law enforcement officials acquire, develop, and sell land in illegal ways.

==== Political interference ====
Much of the deterioration in the functioning of bureaucracy is due to political interference.

— Justice K. S. Radhakrishnan and Justice P. C. Ghose, Supreme Court of India

Interference by politicians and the politician-babus nexus in corruption is an ongoing concern. In October 2013, the Supreme Court of India, in the case of TSR Subramanian & Ors vs Union of India & Ors ordered both Government of India and State governments to ensure fixed tenure to civil servants. The court asked senior bureaucrats to write down the oral instructions from politicians so that a record would be kept of all the decisions. This judgement was seen on the similar lines of the Supreme Court's 2006 judgement in Prakash Singh case on police reforms. The judgement was welcomed by various bureaucrats and the media who hoped that it will help in giving freedom and independence to the functioning of bureaucracy.

=== VIP Culture in Bureaucracy ===
There are several incidents of civil servants misusing their position for personal needs and special priority.The colonial legacy of the British Raj, where officials were treated as elites, still exist in Indian society. The VIP culture practices such as unauthorized use of beacon lights on vehicles, security convoys, and priority access in public places and events, etc. These practices are undemocratic and damages the trust between citizens and administration.

In popular perception, the allure of pursuing a career in the All India Services such as IAS, IPS, IFS lies in the associated privileges and benefits, which drive more than a million candidates to compete for a mere 180 positions each year.

== Reforms ==
=== Central Civil Services Authority ===
To professionalise the Civil Services, the Defence Minister A. K. Antony led in decision on the creation of a Central Civil Services Authority (CCSA) to oversee the higher bureaucracy.

=== Alignment with strategic national goals ===
Under Prime Minister Narendra Modi's principle of "minimum government and maximum governance", government undertook several reforms to align country's civil service with the strategic national goals, including lateral entry, forcibly retiring inept and corrupt officers, etc. Previously, newly hired IAS officers were deployed directly in the state cadres. From 2014, to align civil servants to the government's agenda, they are first deployed within the central government ministries as assistant secretaries for a few years. From 2020 to 2021, the government will conduct a common foundation course for all Group A services to counter the attitude of an elite clique operating in silos. Doing away with the earlier discriminatory practice of appointing only IAS officers in the central government, officers from other services with domain experience are also empanelled and appointed; this is said to have widened the pool for selection of competent domain experts.

==== 360 degree appraisal ====
In 2014, to align the country's civil service systems with the strategic national goals, government implemented a new 360 degree appraisal system which entails Annual Confidential Report (ACR), review of work-related attitude and behavior based on confidential feedback from peers, subordinates, and outsiders stakeholders who have dealt with the officer. This new system replaced the earlier, archaic annual performance appraisal based solely on the ACR written by an officer's boss.

==== Lateral entry of domain experts ====
From 2018, to attract the best domain expert candidates from across the world for the senior civil servants' job, vacancies that were earlier available only through promotion of officers were opened for direct hire or lateral entry as well. This was said to "boost the ministry or department's capabilities and proficiency... [and] provide synergies to policy and implementation". Initially, domain experts, lateral entry candidates were appointed to 10 posts out of a total of 450 posts of joint secretary in the central government, and a further 40 lateral entrants at the director and deputy secretary level were also inducted.

=== Punishment and removal of corrupt officers ===
==== Empowerment of citizens to sue corrupt officers ====
In 2016, the government decided to empower citizens to seek prosecution of corrupt IAS officers. The Department Personnel and Training (DoPT), Ministry of Personnel, Public Grievances and Pensions, has accepted to receive requests from private persons seeking sanction for prosecution in respect of IAS officers without any proper proposal and supporting documents. In 2019, the Government of India dismissed 12 (IRS IT) and 15 (IRS Customs and Central Excise) officers for corruption and bribery charges.

==== Forced retirement of corrupt and inept officers ====
In 2011, the Department of Personnel and Training (DoPT), Ministry of Personnel, Public Grievances and Pensions, created a proposal to retire and remove incompetent, inefficient and unproductive All India Service officers after 15 years of service, which was accepted and rule 16(3) of the All India Services (death-cum-retirement benefits) Rules of 1958 was amended on 31 January 2012.

In 2016, the Ministry of Finance dismissed 72 and prematurely retired another 33 Indian Revenue Service officers for the first time for non-performance and on disciplinary grounds.

In 2019, to send a message that the job posting with government bureaucracy is no longer "permanent for the dishonest, corrupt and inefficient" officers, the government fired 22 corrupt officers from the Indian Revenue Service (IRS) and another 284 Central Secretariat Service officers were under performance audit by a review panel headed by the Cabinet Secretary.

== See also ==
- Gazetted officer
- Order of precedence in India
- Graduate Aptitude Test in Engineering
- Combined Defence Services Examination
- Engineering Services Examination
- Combined Medical Services Examination
- Union Public Service Commission
- Staff Selection Commission
- Public service commissions in India
- Appointments Committee of the Cabinet
- Ministry of Personnel, Public Grievances and Pensions
