= Central Civil Services =

Under the sole jurisdiction of the Indian central government

Central Civil Services of India
- भारत की केंद्रीय सिविल सेवाएं
- National Emblem of India

- Flag of India

The Central Civil Services (CCS) encompasses the various Civil Services of India that are exclusively under the jurisdiction of the Government of India. This is in contrast to the All India Services, which are common to both the central and state government entities, or the state civil services, which fall under the purview of individual states.

The services with the most personnel in the entire Civil Services of India and also the Central Civil Services are with the Central Secretariat Service (Note: As on year 2021, CSS cadre has a total strength of 12,500 members and is controlled by DOPT, Ministry of Personnel GOI. According to a PTI report published by ThePrint on 7 March 2024, the sanctioned strength of the CSS officers is 13,016.) and Indian Revenue Service (IT and C&IT). (Note: The Indian Revenue Service is not one entity and not one service. The two independent branches are controlled by two separate statutory bodies, the Central Board of Direct Taxes (CBDT) and the Central Board of Indirect Taxes and Customs (CBIC). The IT and C&CE also have two different independent service associations. The total members are 4192 (Income Tax) and 5583 (Customs and Indirect Taxes).)

The Cadre Controlling Authority for each established Service is controlled by the respective union government ministries of India. The higher-level positions in the Central Civil Services are classified into Group A and Group B, both of which are gazetted.

== History ==
=== British India ===
With the passing of the Government of India Act 1919, the Imperial Services headed by the Secretary of State for India, were split into two – All India Services and Central Services.

The All India and Central Services (Group A) were designated as Central Superior Services as early as 1924. From 1924 to 1934, Administration in India consisted of 10 All India Services (including Indian Education Service, Indian Medical Service) and 5 central departments, all under the control of Secretary of State for India, and 3 central departments under joint Provincial and Imperial Control. The Central Services were headed by the Viceroy and Governor-General of India.

=== Modern India ===
The Group A officers are appointed by the President of India, and appointments to Group B are made by the authorities specified by a general or special order of the President.

== Nature, deputations and rules ==
=== Rules and regulations ===
The Central Civil Services (CCS) is run as per the Central Civil Services (Classification, Control and Appeal) Rule, and all service members work under restrictions and rules of the Central Civil Services (Conduct) Rules. The Indian Railway Services work under the Railway Services (Conduct) Rules of 1966.

The Central Civil Services also follows CCS (Commutation of Pension) Rules and has its own Recognition of Service Associations Rules 1993 and Leave Travel Concession Rules 1988. The University Grants Commission (UGC), in a circular released in October 2018, directed central universities to adopt the Central Civil Services (Conduct) Rules 1964 for professors at the university.

=== Deputations ===
The members of Central Civil Services are eligible for deputation to state governments either on personal grounds or official approval from both Government of India Staffing Scheme of Government of India.

=== Performance review and dismissal ===
The employees performance review is conducted under the Fundamental Rule (FR) 56 (J) and 56 (I), and also under Rule 48 (1) (b) of the Central Civil Services (Pension) Rules, 1972, that gives "absolute right" to the appropriate authority to retire a government servant, "if it is necessary to do so in public interest".

A government servant can be retired "in public interest" under Central Civil Services (Classification, Control & Appeal) Rules, 1965, as a penalty for possession of assets disproportionate to known source of income or for accepting gratification as a reward for doing or forbearing to do an official act.

== Recruitment ==
The recruitment of the CCS (Group A) is made through Civil Services Examination, Engineering Services Examination, Combined Geo-Scientist and Geologist Examination, I.E.S./I.S.S. Examination, Combined Medical Services Examination, Central Armed Police Forces of Union Public Service Commission (UPSC). All promotions or empanelment in the CCS are either by the Civil Services Board or by the Appointments Committee of the Cabinet.

== Central Civil Services (Group A) ==
The Central Services (Group A) are concerned with the administration of the Union Government. All appointments to Central Civil Services (Group A) are made by the President of India.

=== Organised Service ===
The attributes of an Organised Group 'A' Service (OGAS) are as follows:

- The highest cadre post is not below the Senior Administrative Grade (Level 14).
- The service has all standard grades, such as Junior Time Scale (Level 10), Senior Time Scale (Level 11), Junior Administrative Grade (Level 12), Non-Functional Selection Grade (Level 13), and Senior Administrative Grade (Level 14).
- At least 50% of vacancies in Junior Time Scale (Level 10) are filled through Direct Recruitment.
- All vacancies above Junior Time Scale (Level 10) and up to Senior Administrative Grade (Level 14) are filled by promotion from the next lower Grade.

CLASSIFICATION OF CENTRAL GROUP 'A' CIVIL SERVICES
Sl. No.	Name of the Service	Organised / Non-Organised	Participation in Central Staffing Scheme (CSS)	Cadre Controlling Authority	Total Cadre Strength (officially sanctioned)
NON- TECHNICAL SERVICES
1	Central Secretariat Service	Organised	Yes	Ministry of Personnel, Public Grievances and Pensions (DOPT)	13,016 (Note: According to a PTI report published by ThePrint on 7 March 2024, the sanctioned strength of the CSS officers is 13,016.) (A,B)
2	Indian Foreign Service	Organised	Yes	Ministry of External Affairs	3,556 (A,B)
3	Indian Revenue Service (Customs & Indirect Taxes)	Organised	Yes	Ministry of Finance	5,583
4	Indian Revenue Service (IT)	Organised	Yes	Ministry of Finance	4,192
5	Indian Audit & Accounts Service	Organised	Yes	Comptroller and Auditor General	~ 616
6	Indian Railway Management Service (Note: Indian Railway Management Service is a single service, but includes eight sub-cadres: Traffic, Accounts, Personnel, Civil, Electrical, Mechanical, Signal & Telecommunication, and Stores. Recruitment for the first four is through the Civil Services Exam, while the remaining are recruited through the Engineering Services Exam. .) (Technical and Non-Technical)	Organised	Yes	Ministry of Railways	~ 8,458
7	Indian Civil Accounts Service	Organised	Yes	Ministry of Finance	
8	Indian Defence Accounts Service	Organised	Yes	Ministry of Defence	~ 1000–1200 (A,B)
9	Indian P&T Accounts and Finance Service	Organised	Yes	Ministry of Communications	
10	Indian Postal Service	Organised	Yes	Ministry of Communications	~ 574
11	Indian Defence Estates Service	Organised	Yes	Ministry of Defence	~ 189
12	Indian Information Service	Organised	Yes	Ministry of Information & Broadcasting	~ 2350–2900 (A,B)
13	Indian Trade Service	Organised	Yes	Ministry of Commerce	191
14	Railway Protection Force	Non-Organised		Ministry of Railways	~ 600–950 (A,B)
15	Delhi, Andaman and Nicobar Islands, Lakshadweep, Daman and Diu and Dadra and Nagar Haveli Civil Services (Selection Grade) (Selection Grade)	Non-Organized	No	Ministry of Home Affairs	434
16	Delhi, Andaman and Nicobar Islands, Lakshadweep, Daman and Diu and Dadra and Nagar Haveli Police Services (Selection Grade) (Selection Grade)	Non-Organized	No	Ministry of Home Affairs	533
TECHNICAL SERVICES
15	Research & Analysis Service	Organised		Cabinet Secretariat	Classified
16	National Technical Research Service	Organised		Prime Minister's Office	Classified
17	Defence Research & Development Service	Organised		Ministry of Defence	~ 7256
18	Indian Telecommunications Service	Organised	Yes	Ministry of Communications	~ 1690
19	Indian Ordnance Factories Service	Organised	Yes	Ministry of Defence	~ 1760
20	Central Engineering Service (Roads)	Organised	Yes	Ministry of Road Transport & Highways	
21	Central Water Engineering Service	Organised	Yes	Ministry of Jalshakti	
22	Indian Defence Service of Engineers	Organised	Yes	Ministry of Defence	
23	Central Engineering Service (CPWD)	Organised	Yes	Ministry of Urban Development	
24	Central Electrical & Mechanical Engineering Service (CPWD)	Organised		Ministry of Urban Development	
25	Border Roads Engineering Service	Organised		Ministry of Defence	
26	Central Power Engineering Service	Organised	Yes	Ministry of Power	
27	Indian Supply Service	Organised	Yes		
28	Indian Inspection Service	Organised	Yes		
29	Indian Naval Armament Service	Organised		Ministry of Defence	
30	Indian Naval Material Management Service	Organised		Ministry Of Defence	
31	Indian Broadcasting (Engineering) Service	Organised	Yes		
32	P&T Building Works Service	Organised			
33	Central Architect Service (CPWD)	Organised		Ministry of Urban Development	
34	Indian Radio Regulatory Service	Organised		Ministry of Communications	
35	Indian Skill Development Service	Non-Organised		Ministry of Skill Development	263
HEALTH SERVICES
36	Central Health Services (General Duty Cadre)	Organised		Ministry of Health	
37	Indian Ordnance Factory Health Service	Organised			
38	Indian Railways Health Service	Organised		Ministry of Railways	
NATURAL SCIENCES (TECHNICAL) SERVICES
39	Central Geological Service Group 'A'	Organised		Ministry of Mines	
40	Geological Survey of India Chemical Service Group 'A'	Organised		Ministry of Mines	
41	Geological Survey of India Geophysical Service Group 'A'	Organised		Ministry of Mines	
42	Geological Survey of India Engineering Service Group 'A'	Organised		Ministry of Mines	
43	Indian Meteorological Service	Non-Organised		Ministry of Earth Sciences	
OTHER SERVICES
44	Indian Legal Service	Organised		Ministry of Law & Justice	
45	Indian Economic Service	Organised	Yes	Ministry of Finance	~ 538
46	Indian Statistical Service	Organised	Yes	Ministry of Statistics & Programme Implementation	~ 814
47	Indian Cost Accounts Service	Organised	Yes	Ministry of Finance	
48	Indian Corporate Law Service	Organised	Yes	Ministry of Corporate Affairs	~ 291
49	Defence Aeronautical Quality Assurance Service	Organised		Ministry of Defence	
50	Survey of India Group 'A' Service	Organised		Ministry of Science & Technology	
51	Defence Quality Assurance Service	Organised		Ministry of Defence	
52	Indian Broadcasting (Programme) Service	Organised	Yes		
53	Central Labour Service	Organised		Ministry of Labour & Employment	~ 340
Central Armed Police Forces & Central Police Organisations
54	Intelligence Bureau	Organised		Ministry of Home Affairs	Classified
55	National Investigation Agency	Organised		Ministry of Home Affairs	Classified
56	Indo Tibetan Border Police	Organised		Ministry of Home Affairs	~ 1207 (Note: This is for ITBP Executive Group A (excl. IPS).)
57	Central Industrial Security Force	Organised		Ministry of Home Affairs	
58	Border Security Force	Organised		Ministry of Home Affairs	~ 4065 (Note: This is for BSF Executive Group A (excl. IPS).)
59	Central Reserve Police Force	Organised		Ministry of Home Affairs	
60	Sashastra Seema Bal	Organised		Ministry of Home Affairs	

In 2019, based on the Bibek Debroy committee report of 2015, the Cabinet of India approved the plan to merge eight railway services. In 2022, the government released a gazette notification about the merger of the existing eight services, which fall under the Central Civil Services, into a new Indian Railways Management Service (IRMS). The eight services includes Indian Railway Accounts Service, Indian Railway Personnel Service, Indian Railway Service of Electrical Engineers, Indian Railway Service of Engineers, Indian Railway Service of Mechanical Engineers, Indian Railway Service of Signal Engineers, Indian Railway Stores Service, and Indian Railway Traffic Service. The merged Indian Railways Management Service was again demerged into various specific services as of 2024.

== Central Government Services (Group B) ==
For Group B civil service posts only, the Combined Graduate Level Examination (CGLE) is conducted by the Staff Selection Commission (SSC). (Note: The Schedule of Central Civil Services for Group 'B'. The complete list as per Department of Personnel & Training, Ministry of Personnel, Public Grievances and Pensions, Govt. of India) All appointments to Group B are made by the authorities specified by a general or special order of the President. (Note: The Schedule of Central Civil Services for Group 'B'. The complete list as per Department of Personnel & Training, Ministry of Personnel, Public Grievances and Pensions, Govt. of India)

- Armed Forces Headquarters Services (Civil Service)
- Botanical Survey of India, Group 'B' (Natural Resource)
- Central Electrical Engineering Service, Group 'B' (Engineering)
- Central Engineering Service, Group 'B' (Engineering)
- Central Excise Service, Group 'B' (Civil Service)
- Central Health Service, Group 'B' (Health Science)
- Central Power Engineering Service, Group 'B' (Engineering)
- Central Secretariat Official Language Service, Group 'B' (Civil Service)
- Central Secretariat Service, Group 'B' (Section and Assistant Section Officers Grade only) (Civil Service)
- Central Secretariat Stenographers Service, Group 'B' (Private Secretary and Personal Assistant Grade only) (Civil Service)
- Customs Appraisers Service, Group 'B' – (Principal Appraisers and Head Appraisers) (Civil Service)
- Customs Preventive Service, Group 'B' – (Chief Inspectors) (Civil Service)
- Defence Secretariat Service (Civil Service)
- DANICS (Civil Service)
- DANIPS (Civil Service)
- Geological Survey of India, Group 'B' (Natural Resource)
- Indian Foreign Service, Group 'B' – (General Cadre, Grade I and General Cadre, Grade II only) (Civil Service)
- Indian Posts and Telegraphs Accounts and Finance Service, Group 'B' Telecommunication Wing. (Civil Service)
- Indian Posts & Telegraphs Accounts & Finance Service, Postal Wing, Group 'B' (Civil Service)
- Income Tax Service, Group 'B' (Civil Service)
- Indian Salt Service, Group 'B' (Engineering)
- India Meteorological Service, Group 'B' (Natural Resource)
- Survey of India, Group 'B' (Engineering)
- Postal Superintendents' Service, Group 'B' (Civil Service)
- Postmasters' Service, Group 'B' (Civil Service)
- Railway Board Secretariat Service, Group 'B'(SO and ASO only) (Civil Service)
- Telecommunication Engineering Service, Group 'B' (Engineering)
- Telegraphs Traffic Service, Group 'B' (Engineering)
- Zoological Survey of India, Group 'B' (Natural Resource)

== Corruption, challenges and reforms ==
=== Corruption and challenges ===
In 2016, the Ministry of Finance for the first time, dismissed 72 and prematurely retired another 33 Indian Revenue Service officers for non-performance and on disciplinary grounds. In 2019, Government of India dismissed 12 (IRS IT) and 15 (IRS Customs and Central Excise) officers for corruption and bribery charges. In 2019, Department of Personnel and Training in Ministry of Personnel, Public Grievances and Pensions listed 284 Central Secretariat Service officers for performance audit by review panel headed by Cabinet Secretary of India.

=== Reforms ===
In December 2019, as per a decision approved by Union Cabinet of India, a new Indian Railway Management Service (IRMS) was created by merging eight existing Group A Indian Railway services in the Central Civil Services. A new Indian Skill Development Service was created as a technical cadre within the Ministry of Skill Development and Entrepreneurship.

=== Supreme court cases, directions, and verdicts ===
In May 2025, Supreme Court of India upheld the organised service status of the Central Armed Police Forces. The judgement clarified that "for all intent and purposes, CAPFs belong to OGAS [Organised Group-A Services],"

== See also ==
- All India Services
- Appointments Committee of the Cabinet
- Civil Services Examination
- Civil Services of India
- Combined Defence Services Examination
- Combined Medical Services Examination
- Engineering Services Examination
- Gazetted officer
- Indian Institute of Public Administration
- Indian Railway Management Service
- Ministry of Personnel, Public Grievances and Pensions
- Order of precedence in India
- Public service commissions in India
- Staff Selection Commission
- Union Public Service Commission
