= Ministry of Home Affairs (India) =

Government ministry of India

- Branch of Government of India

- Ministry of Home Affairs

Ministry overview
- Formed: 15 August 1947; 79 years ago
- Jurisdiction: Government of India
- Headquarters: Kartavya Bhavan-03 Janpath, New Delhi
- Annual budget: ₹255,233.53 crore (US$27 billion) (2026–27)
- Minister responsible: Amit Shah, Minister of Home Affairs
- Deputy Ministers responsible: Nityanand Rai, Minister of State for Home Affairs; Bandi Sanjay Kumar, Minister of State for Home Affairs
- Ministry executive: Govind Mohan, IAS, Home Secretary
- Website: गृहमंत्रालय.सरकार.भारत/en

The Ministry of Home Affairs (IAST: Gṛha Mantrālaya) is a ministry of the Government of India. It is mainly responsible for the maintenance of internal security and domestic policy. It is headed by the Minister of Home Affairs.

The Ministry of Home Affairs is also the Cadre Controlling Authority for the Indian Police Service (IPS), DANIPS, DANICS and Central Secretariat Official Language Service (CSOLS).

== History ==
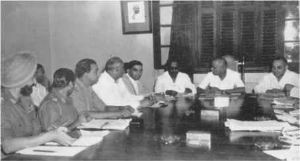
ISS officer V. P. Menon with Rajpramukhs convened by the States Ministry to discuss the future of the Indian States Forces in 1940's.

During British rule, internal security, law enforcement, and public order were managed by the Home Department of the British Indian Government. This department was formally established in 1861 following the Indian Councils Act, tasked with maintaining law and order, overseeing the police forces, and administering the criminal justice system across British India. It played a crucial role in maintaining colonial control, often focused on suppressing dissent and political movements against the British Raj.

The first home minister Vallabhbhai Patel had a decisive role in integrating 562 princely states into the India, which was done with V. P. Menon, a senior civil servant who served as Secretary to the Ministry of the States.

After India gained independence in 1947, the Home Department was reorganized into the Ministry of Home Affairs of the Government of India. The new ministry was entrusted with crucial responsibilities for internal security, law and order, integration of princely states, border management, and the rehabilitation of refugees in the aftermath of Partition. Additionally, the ministry began the process of reorganizing states on linguistic lines, an endeavor that culminated in the States Reorganisation Act of 1956.

The ministry also assumed responsibility for the administration of Union Territories, citizenship laws, and the regulation of foreign nationals. With growing challenges of insurgency, terrorism, and communal violence, the ministry's role expanded to include counter-terrorism policies and coordination among various security agencies. In February 2026, the ministry released PRAHAAR, India's national counter-terrorism policy and strategy.

== Senior officials ==
=== Home Secretary and other senior officials ===
The home secretary (IAST: Gṛiha Sachiva) is the bureaucratic head of the Ministry of Home Affairs. This post is held by a very senior IAS officer of the rank of secretary to Government of India. The current Home Secretary is Govind Mohan, IAS. The Secretary acts as advisor to the Minister on all matters related to policy formulation, implementation, internal security, etc. The pay scale of the Secretary is equivalent to other senior IAS officers in the state or on deputation. The Secretary draws salary at the pay level 17 of the 7th Central Pay Commission i.e. rupees 2,25,000 plus other allowances applicable as per Central Govt rules. All Central Armed Police Forces such as the CRPF, CISF, BSF, etc., and Union territory police forces are under administrative control of the Ministry of Home Affairs.

==== Central Armed Police Forces and domestic intelligence agency ====
Chief of CAPFs, NIA and IB have relative operational independence.This is subject to terms and conditions of the central civil services. DGs of CAPFs may also report to the Special Secretary (internal security) and Special Secretary/additional secretary (border management).

Chiefs of Central Armed Police Forces, National Investigation Agency, and Intelligence Bureau
	Designation
Mahesh Dixit, IPS	Director of the Intelligence Bureau
Gyanendra Pratap Singh, IPS	Director General, Central Reserve Police Force
Praveen Kumar, IPS	Director General, Border Security Force
Praveer Ranjan, IPS	Director General, Central Industrial Security Force
Sanjay Singhal, IPS	Director General, Sashastra Seema Bal
Shatrujeet Singh Kapoor, IPS	Director General, Indo-Tibetan Border Police
B. Srinivasan, IPS	Director General, National Security Guard
Rakesh Aggarwal, IPS	Director General, National Investigation Agency

== Organisation ==
The Ministry of Home Affairs has the following constituent departments:

=== Department of Home ===
Attached/Subordinate Offices

- Andaman and Nicobar Police
- Directorate General–Fire Services, Civil Defense and Home Guards
- Directorate of Forensic Science Services
- Delhi Police
- Central Armed Police Forces
  - Assam Rifles
  - Border Security Force
  - Central Industrial Security Force
  - Central Reserve Police Force
  - Indo-Tibetan Border Police
  - Sashastra Seema Bal
  - National Security Guard
- Intelligence Bureau
- National Investigation Agency
- National Disaster Management Authority
  - National Disaster Response Force
- Jammu and Kashmir Police

Commissions/Committees

- Office of the Registrar General and Census Commissioner
- National Human Rights Commission

Statutory Bodies

- Bureau of Immigration
- Narcotics Control Bureau
- National Crime Records Bureau

Councils

- Inter-State Council

Boards/Academies/Institutions

- Sardar Vallabhbhai Patel National Police Academy, Hyderabad
- National Industrial Security Academy, Hyderabad
- North Eastern Police Academy, Umiam
- National Civil Defence College, Nagpur
- National Fire Service College, Nagpur
- National Forensic Sciences University, Gandhinagar
- Welfare and Rehabilitation Board, New Delhi
- National Institute of Disaster Management, New Delhi
- Regional Institute of Correctional Administration, Kolkata
- Rashtriya Raksha University, Gandhinagar

Autonomous Bodies, Boards & Corporations

- National Foundation for Communal Harmony
- Repco Bank

=== Department of Border Management ===
Department of Border Management, dealing with the management of borders, including coastal borders.

=== Department of Official Language ===
Attached/Subordinated Offices

- Central Translation Bureau

Commissions/Committees

- Committee of Parliament on Official Language
- Town Official Language Implementation Committee

Statutory Bodies

- Central Hindi Training Institute

=== Divisions ===
These are organizational divisions of the ministry itself, without the splitting into specialised departments.

==== Administration Division ====
Handling all administrative and vigilance matters, allocation of work among various Divisions of the ministry and monitoring compliance in furnishing information under the Right to Information Act, 2005, matters relating to the Order of Precedence, Padma Awards, Gallantry Awards, Jeevan Raksha Padak Awards, National Flag, National Anthem, State Emblem of India and Secretariat Security Organisation.

==== Border Management Division ====
Matters relating to coordination by administrative, diplomatic, security, intelligence, legal, regulatory, and economic agencies of the country for the management of international borders, the creation of infrastructure like roads/fencing and floodlighting of borders, border areas development program pilot project on Multi-purpose National Identity Card and Coastal Security.

==== Centre-State Division ====
The division deals with Centre-State relations, including working on the constitutional provisions governing such relations, the appointment of governors, creation of new states, nominations to Rajya Sabha/Lok Sabha, Inter-State boundary disputes, over-seeing the crime situation in States, imposition of President's Rule and work relating to Crime and Criminal Tracking Network System (CCTNS), etc.

==== Coordination Division ====
Intra-ministry coordination work, parliamentary matters, public grievances (PGs), publication of annual report of the ministry, record retention schedule, annual action plan of the ministry, custody of classified and unclassified records of the ministry, internal work study, furnishing of various reports of scheduled castes/scheduled tribes and persons with disabilities, etc.

==== Disaster Management Division ====
Responsible for the response, relief, and preparedness for natural calamities and human-made disasters (except drought and epidemics). The division is also responsible for legislation, policy, capacity building, prevention, mitigation, and long-term rehabilitation.

==== Finance Division ====
The division is responsible for formulating, operating, and controlling the budget of the ministry under the Integrated Finance Scheme.

==== Foreigners Division ====
The division deals with all matters relating to visa, immigration, citizenship, overseas citizenship of India, acceptance of foreign contribution and hospitality.

==== Freedom Fighters and Rehabilitation Division ====
The division frames and implements the Freedom Fighters' Pension Scheme and the schemes for the rehabilitation of migrants from former West Pakistan/East Pakistan and the provision of relief to Sri Lankan and Tibetan refugees. It also handles work relating to Enemy Properties and residual work relating to Evacuee Properties.

==== Human Rights Division ====
The division deals with matters relating to the Protection of Human Rights Act and also matters relating to national integration and communal harmony.

==== Internal Security Division ====
Internal security and law and order, including anti-national and subversive activities of various groups/extremist organisations, policy and operational issues on terrorism, security clearances, monitoring of ISI activities and Home Secretary-level talks with Pakistan on terrorism and drug trafficking as a part of the composite dialogue process.

Recently launched cyber coordination center (CYCORD) https://cycord.gov.in meant for assisting LEAs in all the matters of cyber-crime, cyber-espionage and cyber-terrorism works under this division.

Division deals with arms and explosives; letters of request for mutual legal assistance in criminal matters; National Security Act, 1980 and representations thereunder; administration of Narcotics Control Bureau; providing central assistance to victims of terrorist, communal, and naxal violence; matters relating to breach of privilege of MPs, etc.

Division deals with national integration, human rights and Ayodhya Issue.

==== Judicial Division ====
Legislative aspects of the Bharatiya Nyaya Sanhita (BNS), Bharatiya Nagarik Suraksha Sanhita (BNSS), and also the Commission of Inquiry Act. It also handles matters relating to state legislations, which require the assent of the President under the Constitution, political pension to erstwhile rulers before independence, and mercy petitions under Article 72 of the Constitution.

==== Left Wing Extremism Division. ====
Countering of left-wing Naxalite-Maoist extremism in India.

==== North East Division ====
The division deals with the internal security and law and order situation in the northeastern states, including matters relating to insurgency and talks with various extremist groups operating in that region.

==== Police Division-I ====
The division functions as the cadre controlling authority in respect of Indian Police Service (IPS) and also deals with the award of Presidents' Police Medals for Meritorious/ Distinguished service and Gallantry, etc.

==== Police Division-II ====
This division deals with the policy, personnel, operational (including deployment), and financial matters relating to all the Central Armed Police Forces (CAPFs). It also deals with matters relating to the welfare of the serving and retired CAPF personnel and the deployments in UN peacekeeping missions.

==== Police Modernisation Division ====
The division handles all items of work relating to the modernisation of State Police Forces, provisioning/procurement of various items for the modernisation of Central Police Forces, police reforms, and police missions.

==== Policy Planning Division ====
The division deals with matters relating to policy formulation in respect of internal security issues, international cooperation on counter-terrorism, international covenants, bilateral assistance treaties, and related items of work.

==== Union Territories Division ====
The division deals with all legislative and constitutional matters relating to Union territories, including National Capital Territory of Delhi. It also functions as the cadre controlling authority of the Arunachal Pradesh-Goa-Mizoram-Union Territories (AGMUT) cadre of the Indian Administrative Service (IAS), the Indian Forest Service (IFS/IFoS), and the Indian Police Service (IPS) as also Delhi, Andaman and Nicobar Islands Civil Service (DANICS)/ Delhi, Andaman and Nicobar Islands Police Service (DANIPS). Besides, it is responsible for overseeing the crime and law and order situation in UTs.

== See also ==
- Minister of Home Affairs (India)
- Parliamentary Standing Committee on Home Affairs
- Law enforcement in India
- Indian Police Foundation and Institute
