= Pranjal Lahensingh Patil =

IAS Officer working for indian government

Pranjal Lahensingh Patil IAS
- Born: 1 April 1988 (age 38); Wadaji, Jalgaon, Maharashtra
- Education: St. Xavier's College, Mumbai
- Occupation: IAS officer
- Years active: 2017–present
- Employer: Government of India
- Organization: Indian Administrative Service
- Parents: Lahen Singh B. Patil (father); Jyothi Patil (mother)

Pranjal Lahensingh Patil (born 1 April 1988) is an Indian Administrative Service (IAS) officer and India's first visually impaired woman to hold such a position. Despite losing her vision at the age of six, she has made significant contributions to public administration in India.

== Early life and education ==
Pranjal Patil was born on 1 April 1988 in Wadaji, Jalgaon, Maharashtra, to Lahen Singh B. Patil and Jyothi Patil. She lost her vision completely by the age of six due to a progressive eye condition. She was diagnosed in 1994 and by 1995 Mrs. Patil was totally blind.

Despite these challenges, her parents prioritized her education, enrolling her in Smt. Kamla Mehta School for the Blind in Dadar, Mumbai. Her teachers appreciated her as a very studious and intelligent girl. She studied at the Chandibai Himatlal Manshukhani College in Ullhasnagar. Pranjal excelled academically, achieving 85% in her Class 12 examinations and topping the Arts section at Chandibai College.

After graduating from high school, she earned a degree in Political Science from St. Xavier's College, Mumbai. Later, in her constant quest for learning, Mrs. Patil moved to New Delhi, where she pursued postgraduate studies and obtained a master's degree in International Relations, an MPhil, and a PhD from Jawaharlal Nehru University (JNU), Delhi in International Relations.

While training at the university, she frequently traveled by train and received assistance from terminal staff and daily commuters. This experience heightened her awareness of the civil service's significance and the role of an educated society, where individuals willingly help those in need.

== Civil services career ==
Patil's journey into civil services began with her first attempt at the Union Public Service Commission (UPSC) Civil Services Examination in 2016, where she secured the 744th rank. Unsatisfied with this result, she reappeared in 2017 and achieved an impressive 124th rank. Notably, she prepared for these examinations without any formal coaching, utilizing screen-reading software to study.

Initially, Patil was allocated to the Indian Railway Accounts Service (IRAS). However, due to her visual impairment, she faced challenges in securing the position.She was rejected as the Personnel and Training Department informed her that the Indian Railways does not employ staff with 100% blindness. She was subsequently assigned to the Post and Telecommunications Department, at a lower rank than the first position. To achieve the position, she deserved by merit she had to fight against bureaucracy, met with ministers and even made statements in the press. As a result, Railway Minister Suresh Prabhu promised to give her a job commensurate with her qualifications.

Undeterred, she continued her pursuit and was appointed to the Indian Administrative Service (IAS) in 2017. She commenced her IAS career as an Assistant Collector in Ernakulam, Kerala, in 2018. Subsequently, she served as the Sub-Collector of Thiruvananthapuram and later as the District Magistrate of Ernakulam. As of 2023, she holds the position of Additional Director (Administration) in the Directorate of Education, Delhi.

== Personal life ==
Pranjal Patil is married to Komal Singh Patil who is a Businessman. Her story has been a source of inspiration for many, highlighting the possibilities of overcoming physical challenges to achieve professional success.

== Achievements and Impact ==
Pranjal's success story has been widely covered by the media, highlighting her as a role model for civil service aspirants, especially those with disabilities. She has worked towards making public administration more inclusive and efficient, advocating for better accessibility in government offices and education systems.

== See also ==
- Indian Administrative Service
- Civil Services Examination (India)
- Union Public Service Commission
- Official UPSC Website
- Official Department of Personnel and Training
