= Civil Services Examination =

Civil services examination in India

- Emblem of India
- Acronym: CSE
- Type: Paper-based test
- Administrator: Union Public Service Commission
- Skills tested: General knowledge, writing, comprehension, analytical skills, etc.
- Purpose: Measuring the eligibility of candidates for recommending as civil servants
- Year started: 1855 (171 years ago)
- Duration: 240 minutes (preliminary); 1620 minutes (main); 20 – 40 minutes (personality test)
- Score range: 0 – 2025
- Offered: Once a year
- Restrictions on attempts: 6 (General & EWS); 9 (OBC/PwBD); Unlimited (SC/ST)
- Regions: India
- Languages: English; Hindi; 22 Scheduled languages
- Annual number of test takers: 11,35,697 (registrations for preliminary, 2022); 5,73,735 (appeared for preliminary, 2022)
- Prerequisites: Graduate
- Fee: ₹100; All the candidates (Except Female/SC/ST/Persons with Benchmark Disability Candidates who are exempted from payment of fee) are required to pay fee of Rs. 100/-
- Used by: Government of India
- Qualification rate: 0.078% (2023)
- Website: upsc.gov.in upsconline.nic.in

The Civil Services Examination (abbr. CSE) is a standardised test in India conducted by the Union Public Service Commission (UPSC) for recruitment to higher civil services in the Government of India, such as the All India Services and Central Civil Services (Group A and a few Group B posts). It is considered to be one of the toughest examinations in the world.

It is conducted in three phases: a preliminary examination (abbr. Prelims) consisting of two objective-type papers (Paper I consisting of General Studies and Paper II consisting of Mathematics, Logical Reasoning and Comprehension, referred to as the Civil Service Aptitude Test or CSAT). The candidates who qualify the Prelims will appear in the main examination (abbr. Mains) consisting of nine papers of conventional descriptive type, in which two papers are qualifying and rest of the seven papers are accountable to qualify the Mains. Finally, after qualifying the Mains, a personality test (abbr. Interview) is conducted in the UPSC headquarters in New Delhi. A successful candidate sits for 32 hours of examination during the complete process spanning around one year.

== List of services ==
Those who pass the Civil Service Examination may be selected to join the following services:

All India Services

- Indian Administrative Service (IAS)
- Indian Police Service (IPS)

Central Civil Services (Group A)

- Indian Foreign Service (IFS)
- Indian Audit and Accounts Service (IAAS)
- Indian Civil Accounts Service (ICAS)
- Indian Corporate Law Service (ICLS)
- Indian Defence Accounts Service (IDAS)
- Indian Defence Estates Service (IDES)
- Indian Information Service (IIS)
- Indian Postal Service (IPoS)
- Indian P&T Accounts and Finance Service (IP&TAFS)
- Indian Railway Protection Force Service (IRPFS)
- Indian Revenue Service (IRS)
  - Indian Revenue Service (Income Tax) (IRS-IT)
  - Indian Revenue Service (Custom & Indirect Taxes) (IRS-C&IT)
- Indian Railway Management Service (IRMS)
  - IRMS Traffic
  - IRMS Accounts
  - IRMS Personnel
- Indian Trade Service (ITrS)

Central Civil Services (Group B)

- Armed Forces Headquarters Civil Services (AFHQCS)
- Delhi, Andaman and Nicobar Islands Civil Service (DANICS)
- Delhi, Andaman and Nicobar Islands Police Service (DANIPS)
- Pondicherry Civil Service (PONDICS)
- Pondicherry Police Service (PONDIPS)

Previously, passing the Civil Services Examination also allowed candidates to join the Central Secretariat Service (CSS), (Note: From 1946 until 2003, 50 percent of direct recruitment into CSS cadre was through the UPSC CSE. In 2003, the direct recruitment through CSE has been permanently stopped and now happens through UPSC Limited Departmental Competitive Examination.) Indian Ordnance Factories Service (IOFS) (Note: The service has been removed from the list of services that are offered by UPSC through Civil Services Examination, since 2022.) and the engineering services of Indian Railway Management Service (IRMS) cadre i.e. IRSEE, IRSME, IRSE, IRSSE for the period of 4 years (2021–2025). Later the IRMS Engineering services remerged into the UPSC ESE examination since 2026.

== Process ==
Every year, the UPSC releases the notification for the Civil Services Examination between January and February. The application process for the Preliminary examination also occurs during this period. Admit cards for the Prelims are typically issued 1–2 weeks prior to the examination. The Preliminary examination is generally conducted on the last Sunday of May, with results being declared within 2–3 weeks, usually in June or July.

Since 2025, the schedule for the Mains examination has been shifted from September to August. The Mains examination is conducted over a span of five days, spread across two weeks. Results for the Mains are generally announced within 2–3 months; in 2025, the results were declared in November. Candidates who qualify are then allowed to make corrections and update information in the Common Application Form, CAF (formerly known as the Detailed Application Form, DAF), including service preferences, interests, hobbies, and achievements.

The Personality Test (Interview) is usually conducted between December and February, and the final results are typically released in March or April.

After the final result of the successful candidates and other necessary formalities, the training program i.e. the Foundation Course for the selected candidates usually commences the following July–August or sometimes September in Lal Bahadur Shastri National Academy of Administration.

== Eligibility ==
Eligibility for the examination is as follows:

=== Nationality ===
- For the Indian Administrative Service (IAS), the Indian Police Service (IPS) and the Indian Foreign Service (IFS); the candidate must be a citizen of India.
- For other services, the candidate must be one of the following:
1. A citizen of India.
2. A citizen of Nepal or a subject of Bhutan.
3. A Tibetan refugee who settled permanently in India before 1 January 1962.
4. A person of Indian origin who has migrated from Pakistan, Myanmar, Sri Lanka, Kenya, Uganda, Tanzania, Zambia, Malawi, Zaire, Ethiopia or Vietnam with the intention of permanently settling in India.

=== Educational qualification ===
All candidates must have as a minimum one of the following educational qualifications:

- A degree from a Central, State or a Deemed university
- A degree received through correspondence or distance education
- A degree from an open university
- A qualification recognized by the Government of India as being equivalent to one of the above

The following candidates are also eligible, but must submit proof of their eligibility from a competent authority at their institute/university at the time of the main examination, failing which they will not be allowed to attend the exam.

- Candidates who have appeared in an examination the passing of which would render them educationally qualified enough to satisfy one of the above points.
- Candidates who have passed the final exam of the MBBS degree but have not yet completed an internship.
- Candidates who have passed the final exam of ICAI, ICSI and ICWAI.
- A degree from a private university.
- A degree from any foreign university recognized by the Association of Indian Universities.

=== Age ===
The candidate must have attained the age of 21 years and must not have attained the age of 32 years (for the General category candidate) on 1 August of the year of examination. Prescribed age limits vary with respect to caste reservations.

- For Other Backward Castes (OBC) the upper age limit is 35 years.
- For Scheduled Castes (SC) and Scheduled Tribes (ST), the limit is 37 years.
- For Defence Services Personnel disabled in operations during hostilities, the limit is 40 years.
- For Candidates belonging to ex-servicemen including Commissioned officers and ECOs/SSCOs who have rendered military services for at least five years as of 1 August, of the year and have been released
- For PWD candidates, the limit is 37 years.
- For Domiciles of Jammu and Kashmir from 1 January 1980 to 31 December 1989, the limit is 32 years.
- For the Economically Weaker Section (EWS) category, the standard age limits apply.

=== Number of attempts ===
The number of times a candidate can appear for the exam are given below.

- General category candidates – 6
- OBC category candidates – 9
- SC/ST candidates – unlimited attempts till 37 years of age.

Appearing to attempt one of the papers in the preliminary examination is counted as an attempt, including disqualification/ cancellation of candidature. However, applying to sit the exam but failing to attend is not counted as an attempt.

=== Restrictions on Applying for the Civil Services Examination (since CSE-2026) ===
- IAS/IFS from previous exams
  - A candidate who is already appointed to the IAS or IFS from an earlier exam and continues to be a member of that service, is not eligible to appear for CSE-2026.
  - If such a candidate is appointed to IAS or IFS after the Preliminary Examination-2026 but continues in service, they shall not be eligible for the Main Examination-2026 even if qualified in Prelims.
  - If such a candidate joins IAS or IFS after the commencement of Mains-2026 but before results are declared, they shall not be considered for any service based on CSE-2026 results.
- IPS from previous exams
  - A candidate who has been selected or appointed to the IPS based on an earlier examination shall not be eligible to choose or be allocated IPS in CSE-2026.
- Candidates allocated IPS or Central Group 'A' through CSE-2026 : These candidates can appear in CSE-2027, if otherwise eligible, subject to the following:
  - They must obtain one-time exemption from joining training for the service allocated through CSE-2026 to appear in CSE-2027.
  - They shall join only the Foundation Course (FC) training.
  - If they neither join training nor take exemption, their service allocation from CSE-2026 is cancelled.
  - If they are recommended in CSE-2027, they may choose the service from either CSE-2026 or CSE-2027 and join training for CSE-2027. The other allocation is cancelled.
  - If they are not allocated any service in CSE-2027, they can join the service allocated through CSE-2026.
  - If they do not join training for either CSE-2026 or CSE-2027, both allocations are cancelled.
  - Their seniority will be decided according to joining the service from CSE-2026 or CSE-2027; seniority shall not be lowered.
  - They are not allowed to appear for CSE-2028 or later unless they resign from the allocated service.
  - If they want to use remaining attempts after the one-time exemption, they must not join any service allocated from CSE-2026 or CSE-2027; such allocation shall be automatically cancelled.
  - Candidates allocated service in CSE-2025 or earlier are given one-time opportunity to appear in CSE-2026 or CSE-2027 to utilize remaining attempts without resigning. To appear in CSE-2028 or later, they must resign from the allocated service.

== Preliminary ==
The pattern of the Preliminary examination, also known as the Prelims exam up to 2010, was based on the recommendations of the Kothari Commission (1979). It included two examinations, one on general studies worth 150 marks, and the second on one of 23 optional subjects worth 300 marks. Until 2011, when it was revamped, the preliminary pattern was sustained with only minor changes once every ten to fifteen years.

From 2011 onwards, the preliminary examination intends to focus on analytical abilities and understanding rather than the ability to memorize. The new pattern includes two papers of two hours duration and 200 marks each. Both papers have multiple-choice objective type questions only. They are as follows:

=== General Studies (Paper I) ===
Tests the candidate's knowledge of current events, the history of India and the Indian national movement, Indian and world geography, Indian polity Panchayati Raj system, and governance, economic and social development, environmental ecology, biodiversity, climate change, and general science, Art and culture.

=== CSAT (Paper II) ===
The CSAT or Civil Services Aptitude Test tests the candidate's skills in comprehension, interpersonal skills, communication, logical reasoning, analytical ability, decision-making, problem-solving, basic numeracy, data interpretation, English language comprehension skills, and mental ability. It is qualifying, and the marks obtained in this paper are not counted for merit. However, the candidate must score a minimum of 33 percent in this paper to qualify for the Prelims exam.

==== Changes ====
In August 2014, the centre announced that English marks in CSAT will not be included for gradation or merit and 2011 candidates may get a second chance to appear for the test next year.

In May 2015, the Government of India announced that Paper II of the preliminary examination would be qualifying in nature i.e. it will not be graded for eligibility in the Mains Examination and a candidate will need to score at least 33% to be eligible for grading based on marks of Paper I of the Preliminary Examination. Those who qualify in the Prelims become eligible for the Mains.

== Mains ==
The Civil Services Mains Examination consists of a written examination and an interview.

=== Mains Examination ===
The Civil Services Main written examination consists of nine papers, two qualifying and seven ranking in nature. The range of questions may vary from just one mark to sixty marks, twenty words to 600 words answers. Each paper is of a duration of 3 hours. Candidates who pass qualifying papers are ranked according to marks and a selected number of candidates are called for an interview or a personality test at the commission's discretion.

According to the new marks allocations in Civil Service Examination 2013, there are some changes made in the examination according to the suggestion of Prof. Arun. S. Nigavekar Committee. However, after some controversy, the qualifying papers for Indian languages and English were restored.

Civil Services New Mains Format
| Paper | Subject | Marks |
|---|---|---|
| Paper A^{[A]} | (One of the Indian languages listed below, to be selected by the candidate (from the languages listed in the Eighth Schedule to the Constitution of India) (Qualifying) | 300 |
| Paper B | English (Qualifying) | 300 |
| Paper I | Essay | 250 |
| Paper II | General Studies I (Indian heritage and culture, history and geography of the world and society) | 250 |
| Paper III | General Studies II (Governance, constitution, policy, social justice and international relations) | 250 |
| Paper IV | General Studies III (Technology, economic development, bio-diversity, environment, security and disaster management) | 250 |
| Paper V | General Studies IV (ethics, integrity and aptitude) | 250 |
| Paper VI | Two papers on one subject to be selected by the candidate from the list of optional subjects below (250 marks for each paper) | 250 |
| Paper VII | Two papers on one subject to be selected by the candidate from the list of optional subjects below (250 marks for each paper) | 250 |
| Sub Total (Written Test) | | 1750 |
| Personality Test (Interview) | | 275 |
| Total Marks | | 2025 |

1.^{A} The paper A on Indian Language will not, however, be compulsory for candidates hailing from the states of Arunachal Pradesh, Manipur, Meghalya, Mizoram, Nagaland and Sikkim.

==== List of languages ====
The examination is available in the following languages, with the name of the script in parentheses:

- Assamese (Assamese)
- Bengali (Bengali)
- Bodo (Devanagari)
- Dogri (Devanagari)
- English (English)
- Gujarati (Gujarati)
- Hindi (Devanagari)
- Kannada (Kannada)
- Kashmiri (Persian)
- Konkani (Devanagari)
- Maithili (Devanagari)
- Malayalam (Malayalam)
- Manipuri (Bengali)
- Marathi (Devanagari)
- Nepali (Devanagari)
- Odia (Odia)
- Punjabi (Gurumukhi)
- Sanskrit (Devanagari)
- Santhali (Devanagri or Ol Chiki)
- Sindhi (Devanagari or Arabic)
- Tamil (Tamil)
- Telugu (Telugu)
- Urdu (Persian)

==== Optional subjects ====
The subjects available for Papers VI and VII are:

- Agriculture
- Animal Husbandry and Veterinary Science
- Anthropology
- Botany
- Chemistry
- Civil Engineering
- Commerce and Accountancy
- Economics
- Electrical Engineering
- Geography
- Geology
- History
- Law
- Literature of any one of the languages listed above
- Management
- Mathematics
- Mechanical Engineering
- Medical Science
- Philosophy
- Physics
- Political Science and International Relations
- Psychology
- Public Administration
- Sociology
- Statistics
- Zoology

== Interview ==
The UPSC CSE Personality Test (commonly known as interview), conducted at Dholpur House after clearing the rigorous Mains examination, functions not as a test of encyclopedic retention but as a comprehensive evaluation of a candidate's mental caliber, social traits, and administrative potential across multiple interconnected dimensions. Rather than merely re-verifying academic proficiency, a five-member board chaired by a senior UPSC member assesses candidates holistically through their Detailed Application Form (DAF), exploring their intellectual depth, situational crisis management, emotional intelligence, and constitutional morality. Crucially, factors such as balanced judgment on socio-economic issues, clarity of thought under cross-questioning, active social empathy, and uncompromising integrity form the bedrock of the interview, determining whether an aspirant possesses the nuanced temperament, leadership aptitude, and ethical grounding required for public service.

== See also ==
- All India Services
- Central Civil Services
- Civil Services of India
- Combined Defence Services Examination
- Graduate Aptitude Test in Engineering
- Engineering Services Examination
- Combined Medical Services Examination
- Staff Selection Commission
- Public service commissions in India
- Appointments Committee of the Cabinet
- Ministry of Personnel, Public Grievances and Pensions
