= Indian Post and Telecommunication Accounts and Finance Service =

Group "A" Central Civil Services of the Union of India

The Indian Post & Telecommunication Accounts and Finance Service / IP&TAFS (now known as Indian Communication Finance Service / ICFS) is a Group "A" Central Civil Services of the Union of India. The service was started in 1972 for prudent and professional management of the finances of the Department of Posts and Department of Telecommunications, which were the sole providers of the communications needs of the country at that time. Gradually, the service has crystallized into a professional cadre of over 376 officers. In 2017, 25 officers were recruited through the Civil Services Examination conducted by Union Public Service Commission.

== Duties performed by officers of IP&TAFS GR.’A’ ==
As in the other Central Services, the officers are liable to be transferred and posted in anywhere in India. The officers of IP&TAFS are working in Department of Telecom, Department of Posts, and various other ministries and statutory bodies of Govt of India on deputation.

In the Department of Telecommunications, the officers are posted at DOT Headquarters as adviser, Sr DDG, DDG, directors & ADG. In field units the officers are posted as controllers or joint controllers of communication accounts (CCA/JCCA), who are involved in the collection of license fees and spectrum usage charges from Airtel, Vodafone, Idea, BSNL, MTNL and other service providers. They check and disburse claims received under the Universal Service Obligation fund. They carry out administrative functions such as settlement of pension cases of DoT employees, and maintaining General Provident Fund accounts of DoT employees. The amount collected under licensing was approximately Rs.44000 crores for the financial year 2017-18. The CCA units also assist in the administration of Universal Service Obligation Fund under the Ministry of Communications & IT for providing telecom service in rural/remote areas of the country involving planning & forecasting, tendering, costing, disbursement of support to service providers, and monitoring. The collection towards USO for the 10th Plan Period is around Rs. 13000 crores.

In the Department of Post, the officers from this service are manning the offices of FA / DDG / GM, director, ADG /dy director / ACAO of Postal Accounts located at DOP Headquarters and in all states. The work in these offices mainly comprises maintaining General Provident Fund accounts of the staff employed in a particular postal circle, settlement of pension cases, checking of money order deliveries and NSCs, budgeting and financial control, internal audit of postal units and rendering financial advice to the concerned head of the circle.

Besides IP&T AFS, Gr. ‘A’ officers can be appointed on deputation to Central Government, State Governments, Central Staffing Scheme, Autonomous Organizations/ Subordinate Organizations, PSUs and UN Organizations/International Organizations like world Bank, Asian Development Bank in various capacities.

== Cadre Controlling Authority ==
Member Finance, Digital Communication Commission of India, Department of Telecommunications is the Cadre Controlling Authority of IP&TAFS), Group "A"& "B". Member Finance is an ex officio Secretary to Government of India. Sri Manish Sinha holds the post of Member Finance.

== Hierarchy ==
Grade	Designation in the field	Designation in headquarters	Basic pay
Apex Scale (pay level 17)	Nil	Secretary / Controller General of Communication Accounts	₹225,000 (US$2,300)
Higher Administrative Grade (+) (pay level 16)	Principal Chief Controller of Communication Accounts	Member (Finance), Department of Telecommunications / Posts	₹205,400 (US$2,100)—₹224,400 (US$2,300)
Higher Administrative Grade (pay level 15)	Chief Controller of Communication Accounts	Additional Secretary	₹182,200 (US$1,900)—₹224,100 (US$2,300)
Senior Administrative Grade (pay level 14)	Controller of Communication Accounts	Joint Secretary	₹144,200 (US$1,500)—₹218.2 (US$2.30)
Junior Administrative Grade (Functional) (pay level 13)	Deputy Controller of Communication Accounts	Director	₹123,100 (US$1,300)—₹215,900 (US$2,200)
Senior Time Scale (Non Functional) (pay level 12)	Assistant Controller of Communication Accounts (Selection Grade)	Deputy Secretary	₹78,800 (US$820)—₹209.2 (US$2.20)
Senior Time Scale (pay level 11)	Assistant Controller of Communication Accounts	Under Secretary	₹67,700 (US$700)—₹208.7 (US$2.20)
Junior Time Scale (pay level 10)	Junior Accounts Officer	Assistant Secretary	₹56,100 (US$580)—₹177.5 (US$1.80)
