= DANICS =

Civil service of Indian Union Territories

Delhi, Andaman and Nicobar Islands, Lakshadweep, Daman and Diu and Dadra and Nagar Haveli (Civil) Services

Agency overview
- Formed: 1992; 34 years ago
- Type: Civil service
- Jurisdiction: Union Territories
- Headquarters: New Delhi
- Employees: 208 (2016)
- Agency executive: T. V. Somanathan, Cabinet Secretary
- Parent ministry: Ministry of Home Affairs

The Delhi, Andaman and Nicobar Islands, Lakshadweep, Daman and Diu and Dadra and Nagar Haveli (Civil) Services, abbreviated DANICS and formerly called the Delhi, Andaman and Nicobar Islands Civil Service is the civil service of the Union Territories of India. It is part of the Central Civil Services (CCS).

Candidates are recruited directly through the Civil Services Examination (CSE). Selected Group B officers are responsible for the administration of Delhi, Andaman and Nicobar Islands, Lakshadweep, and Dadra and Nagar Haveli and Daman and Diu.

== Selection ==
Direct recruitments to DANICS are conducted through the Civil Services Examination (CSE) by the Union Public Service Commission (UPSC), comprising three-stages—preliminary exam, main exam, and personality test. Two thirds of the strength is filled by direct recruitment and the remaining by promotion.

== Cadre ==
The Union Territories Division of the Ministry of Home Affairs is the cadre controlling authority for DANICS. As of 2016, DANICS comprised 208 personnel, while the sanctioned strength was 367.

== Postings ==
DANICS officers are initially posted as Assistant collector (District Administration, Delhi) or Sub Divisional Magistrate. On deputation in the autonomous Bodies of Delhi like Municipal Corporation of Delhi, North Delhi Municipal Corporation, Delhi District Administration etc. or as Deputy Secretary in different Ministries of Delhi Government. Other than Delhi DANICS officers are regularly posted to UTs of Daman & Diu, Dadra & Nagar Haveli, Andaman & Nicobar Islands and Lakshdweep Islands. Recently Three DANICS officers were transferred and posted to UT of Chandigarh thereby increasing the territorial extent of DANICS cadre. Ministry of Home Affairs is considering the inclusion of UT of Ladakh also into DANICS cadre but official notification in this regard has not been issued so far. After attaining seniority, they get promotion into Senior Grades (JAG-I and JAG-II/SAG) and get inducted into the AGMUT cadre of the Indian Administrative Service.

== See also ==
- DANIPS
- Indian State Civil Services
- List of Public service commissions in India
