= Armed Forces Headquarters Civil Services =

Group A Central Civil Services with induction at Group B grade

- State Emblem of India

- Flag of India

Armed Forces Headquarters Civil Services (AFHQCS) is a Group A Central Civil Services with induction at Group B grade, responsible for policy formulation, implementation and providing administrative support through civilian officers and staff to the Tri-services headquarters of Indian Armed Forces and Inter-Services Organizations (ISOs) such as DRDO, DGQA, DGAQA, DGNCC etc under the Ministry of Defence (MOD). The cadre was established in 1968. The number of employees in the service in 1968 was 1778; in 2011, 2644; and in 2016, 3235.

== Background ==
In 1942, during World War II, civilian employees under different departments and branches of the Armed Forces Headquarters responsible for providing static ancillary services were reorganized and consolidated under one head which was called the Chief Administrative Officer (CAO). The first CAO took over on 1 August 1942. In 1987, the post of Chief Administrative Officer (CAO), was upgraded to the level of a Joint Secretary (JS).

== Command and control ==
AFHQCS being an integral and specialist Service of Ministry of Defence (India) reports to Hon'ble Minister of Defence (India) through Defence Secretary/JS & CAO. The Defence Secretary is the Cadre Controlling Authority of AFHQCS.

== Upgrading of posts ==
The AFHQCS pay grades have been revised upwards following the 4th, 5th, 6th, and 7th Central Pay Commissions: in 1968, it had four grades, 204 were in Group A, and 1472 in Group B. The highest grade was senior civil staff officer, a level analogous to deputy secretary. After the 4th Central Pay Commission (1986), and Sixth Central Pay Commission(2006)a large number of existing posts were upgraded. By 2011 Group A level posts had doubled to 409 including 4 at Joint secretary level, and 2235 at Group B level. Following the 7 CPC, in July 2013, a committee was constituted to carry out further cadre restructuring/review of AFHQ Civil Service to enhance the career prospects of the AFHQ-Civil Service. It currently has six grades/levels, from Assistant Section Officer to Principal Director.

== Grades and levels ==
There are three levels of inductions into the AFHQ service wherein there is a direct entry(DR) through prestigious Civil Services Examination (CSE) conducted by Union Public Service Commission as Section Officer ( Group -B Gazetted), then direct recruitment at ASO level through SSC ( Combined Graduate level) and by promotion from upper division clerk (UDC) (Clerical Cadre) in ASO. The evolution of the service, its hierarchical structure, pay grades, and levels, are tabulated below:

AFHQ Civil Service: Grades and Levels Table 1
	Designation and Group	Pay grade-scales 1968	Pay Band and Scale [after 6CPC] 2008	Grade Pay (Rs) 2008	level in Pay matrix 2016
1	Senior Administrative Grade (2001) designation changed to Principal Director in October 2002.(Group`A') AFHQ Civil Service has 11 posts of Principal Director (Joint Secretary Equivalent) .	-	PB-4 37400-67000	10000	14
2	Director (Group 'A') Directors of the AFHQ Civil Service eligible for appointment to Principal Director on completion three years service.	-	PB-4 37400-67000	8700	13
3	Senior Civilian Staff Officer/Joint Director (2001) designation changed to Joint Director in October 2002.(Class I/ Group 'A') Joint Directors of the AFHQ Civil Service eligible for appointment to the Director grade on completion of 05 years of approved service in the grade	1100-50-1400	PB-3 15600-39100	7600	12
4	Civilian Staff Officer (2001) designation changed to Deputy Director in October 2002.(Group 'A') Deputy Directors of the AFHQ Civil Service will be eligible for appointment to the Joint Director grade and to other administrative posts on completion of 05 years of approved service in the grade.	740-30-100-50-1150	PB-3 15600-39100	6600	11
5	Assistant Civilian Staff Officer (2001) Designation changed to Section Officer in October 2002 Group 'B' 50% of the posts of Section Officers are filled by Direct Recruitment. Section Officers eligible for promotion to the grade of Deputy Directors on completion of 06 years service. In addition, up-gradation (Non-Functional Scale) to the Grade Pay of Rs. 5400/- in PB-3 on completion of 4 years approved service as Section Officer	350-25-500-30-520-EB-20-800	PB-2 (i) 9300-34800 (on initial appointment) (ii) 15600-39100 (Non-functional scale/Grade Pay on completion of 4 years approved service)	(i) 4800 (ii) 5400 (Non- functional Grade Pay)	8-9
6	Assistant Section Officer (Group 'B', Non-Gazetted) Ministerial. Assistant Section officer grade done by Direct Recruitment (50%) and 50% by Promotion from UDC grade.	210-10-270-15-200-EB-15-450- 20-520	Group 'B', Non- Gazetted) PB-2 9300-34800	4600	7

== Strength ==
The authorized strength of the service is 2644 (2011), an increase of 866, from a total of 1778 in 1968. This is in addition to Armed Forces Headquarters Stenographers Service, which has an overall strength of 856 (8 Senior Principal Private Secretary; 44 Principal Private Secretaries; 300 Private Secretary; and 504 Personal Assistants). The increase in strength of the service is tabulated below:

Strength of AFHQCS 1968-2016 Table 2
	Designation and Group	authorized strength 1968	authorized strength 2001	authorized strength 2011	authorized strength 2016
1	Senior Administrative Grade] Designation Changed to Principal Director in October 2002.(Group`A') AFHQ Civil Service has 4 posts of Principal Director.	nil	2	3	4
2	Director (Group 'A')	nil	9	20	21
3	Senior Civilian Staff Officer/Joint Director. Joint Director, since October 2002.(Group 'A')	12	72	83	157
4	Civilian Staff Officer. Deputy Director since in October 2002.(Group 'A')	194	253	303	419
5	Superintendent- Central civil services class II ministerial (1968)/ Assistant Civilian Staff Officer (2001). Designation changed to Section Officer in October 2002 Group 'B'	506	683	778	514
6	Assistant Section Officer (Group 'B', Non-Gazetted) Ministerial.	1066	1709 including leave reserve	1457	2120
		1778	2571	2644	3235

== Time Line ==
=== 1 August 1942 ===
In response to the demands of the World War II civilian employees in the War Department in Delhi are consolidated under the Office of Chief Administrative Officer (CAO). The first four CAO were brigadiers of the Indian Army.

=== 1 March 1968 ===
Armed Forces Headquarters Civil Service constituted as group B Service from the existing staff under the Armed Forces headquarters and inter service organisations. The highest grade in the AFHQ Civil Service is Senior Staff Officer, analogous to a deputy secretary, with pay grade of Lt colonel.

=== 1987 ===
The post of CAO is upgraded to Joint Secretary.

=== 2001 ===
The Armed Forces Headquarters Civil Service Rules, 2001, superseded Armed Forces Headquarters Civil Service Rules, 1968. Two Existing posts upgraded to JS, and Nine to Director.

=== 31 October 2002 ===
AFHQCS adopts new designations of Principal Director (Senior Administrative Grade); Joint Director (Senior Civilian Staff officer), analogous to Civil Service time scale post with 9 years of service; Deputy Director (deputy director), analogous to civil service time scale post with 4 years of service; and Section Officer (Assistant Civilian Section Officer) .

=== 15 April 2011 ===
Principal Director posts increased from 1 to 3: one each in the Military Secretary's branch, Adjutant General's branch, and Directorate general of Quality assurance. 20 existing post upgraded to Director post, a post analogous to civil service time scale post with 13 years

=== 2017 ===
Principal Director posts increased from 4 to 11 and Directors posts from 21 to 36. All promotions are based on vacancies at higher grade. All Directors in the service are empanelled to be Principal Directors. The present strength of AFHQ CS is 3235.

== See also ==
- Pay commission
- Sixth Central Pay Commission
- 7th Central Pay Commission (CPC) and Defence Forces
