= Indian Salt Service =

- State Emblem of India

- Flag of India

Indian Salt Service is a Central Engineering Service of the Government of India. Under the administrative control of the Ministry of Commerce and Industry, it is one of the smallest Central services under the Government of India.

== History ==
The organized and uniform collection of tax revenue on salt in British India began under the British Raj. Both before and after that, various native rulers of the Indian Princely states (outside British India proper) collected such revenue in accordance with their own revenue and administrative requirements and resources. In 1856, the government appointed the young William Chichele Plowden, Secretary of the Board of Revenue of the North West Provinces, to report on the establishment of a uniform system of revenue realisation from salt within the British Provinces, and he recommended the extension of the excise system, the reduction of duty, and the introduction of a system of licensing as the measures to achieve this goal.

In 1876, separate departments under a Salt Commissioner were set up, and these operated at the level of each British Province and Presidency. It was with the passing of the Government of India Act 1935, that within British India (which then included much of present-day Pakistan) salt came under the exclusive control of the central government, with the Government of India taking over the task of collecting salt revenue and transferring it from the provincial salt agencies to the Central Excise and Revenue Department. In 1944, the Government of India passed the Central Excises and Salt Act which unified and amended all laws dealing with duties on excise and salt.

The Salt Department was originally a part of the Central Board of Revenue under the Ministry of Finance, but since a reorganisation of the ministries of India in 1957 it has come under the authority of the Ministry of Commerce and Industry.

According to the Union List of subjects under the Seventh Schedule of the Indian Constitution, the "manufacture, supply and distribution of salt by Union agencies; regulation and control of manufacture, supply and distribution of salt by other agencies", is the responsibility of the Government of India. The posts of Salt Controller, Deputy Salt Controller and Assistant Salt Controller were re-categorized as Salt Commissioner, Deputy Salt Commissioner and Assistant Salt Commissioner in 1952 and the Indian Salt Services were created in 1954 for the realisation of the entry under the Union List. The Salt Service has both Group A and Group B wings.

== Recruitment ==
The Salt Service is one of the smallest services under the Government of India with a sanctioned strength of only 11 posts. As a central engineering service, recruitment to the Indian Salt Service is conducted by the Union Public Service Commission.

== Service hierarchy ==
The Indian Salt Service is part of India's Salt Organization which is headquartered in Jaipur. The service is headed by the Salt Commissioner below whom are five Deputy Salt Commissioners and nine Assistant Salt Commissioners who man the agency with the help of other supporting staff. The Deputy Salt Commissioners head regional offices and the Assistant Salt Commissioners are in charge of divisional offices of the organisation. The Service has four regional offices at Chennai, Mumbai, Ahmedabad and Kolkata and field offices in the salt producing states.

== Functions ==
The Salt Service is tasked with several functions including monitoring and quality updation of salt, setting production targets, providing technical guidance to salt manufacturers and leasing and managing department lands for the same, collection of cess, fees and rents and the implementation of various schemes aimed at combating iodine deficiency and programs for promoting the growth of the salt industry in India.
