= Imperial Secretariat Service =

Civil service of British India (1919–1945)

The Imperial Secretariat Service (commonly abbreviated as the ISS) was a civil service of the British Empire in British India during British rule in the period between 1919 and 1945. The members served in the 5 central departments (1924 to 1934) and then later expanded to 10 central departments at that time, Secretariat of the Viceroy's Executive Council and later Cabinet Secretariat and Central Secretariat.

The service was one of the "Imperial Services" with the Imperial Civil Service, Indian Imperial Police, and Imperial Forest Service of the Indian Government under the British colonial rule in India.

This service still continues in the contemporary Civil Services of India, Central Superior Services of Pakistan and Bangladesh Civil Service, though these are now organised differently post-independence. It is an earliest organised civil service.

== History ==
The role of the service was ensuring of the continuity of administration in the Central Secretariat called as the “Administration of the Secretariat and House Keeping”.

In the year 1919, the Imperial Secretariat Service came into being as one of the offshoots of the Lewllyn-Smith Committee which had been set up on the eve of the introduction of the Montagu–Chelmsford Reforms. As per Report of Government of India Secretariat Procedure Committee 1919, the general status of this service was recognised as equivalent to that of Provincial Civil Service (PCS) and that all members treated as gazetted officers.

The posts of Assistant Superintendent, Superintendent, Assistant Secretary, Under Secretary were filled by officers drawn from the Imperial Secretariat Service during the British Raj.

In 1946, after India gained independence from Britain, the Imperial Secretariat Service was replaced by Central Secretariat Service in India. However, in Pakistan, a Central Secretariat Service was formed in Central Superior Services of Pakistan, which was later replaced and renamed to Office Management Group (OMG) and Secretariat Group (SG).

== Recruitment ==
The recruitment of the members was made by Central Staff Selection Board, which was precursor of the Union Public Service Commission set up in 1926. As per Report of Government of India Secretariat Procedure Committee 1919, it was suggested that Staff Selection Board should recruit from the main sections of the community namely Hindus, Muslims, Europeans and Anglo-Indian.

All candidates chosen by examination were given probation for a year before their appointment in the Secretariat by a definite certificate of confirmation by the Secretary in the Department.

=== Women ===
Women were recruited to Imperial Secretariat Service Class II but were disqualified for higher posts in the various departments under the control of the Governor-General of India like Imperial Secretariat Service Class I.

== Responsibilities and work profile ==
The officers were policy and coordination specialists. The officers were engaged in:

- Reading and digesting provincial and departmental reports, then producing a concise summary highlighting facts, issues, and recommendations.
- Specialists in drafting policy notes, statutory rules, legislative drafts, and official correspondence for the Viceroy’s Executive Council.
- Drafting official notes and replies for Ministers or Members of Council, ensuring they aligned with precedent, law, and Government policy.
- Preparing background material for legislative debates in the Legislative Assembly or Council of State, including collecting statistics and relevant precedents.
- Routing files for inter-departmental consultation, e.g., sending a Finance-related railway project to both the Railway Board and the Finance Department for input.
- Maintaining secrecy in matters of defence, foreign affairs, and finance, with special procedures for confidential telegrams and documents.
- Ensuring timely circulation so that decision-makers had adequate time to study documents before meetings.

They were the official communication channel between - provincial Governments and the Central Government, the Central Government and the Secretary of State’s Office in London and different departments within the Central Government itself.

== Postings ==
The members of the Imperial Secretariat Service served in New Delhi after the capital shifted from Calcutta in 1912, and worked in Shimla during the summer months as the Government of India moved there seasonally. They had previously been based in Calcutta before the transfer of the capital.

Some officers were deputed to work in provincial secretariats in places such as Bombay, Madras, Lahore, and Rangoon to coordinate central–state administrative matters. A small number were attached to the India Office in Whitehall as “Secretariat officers on special duty,” liaising between the Secretary of State for India and the Viceroy’s Government.

A few ISS officers served temporarily in places like Karachi (for commerce/shipping project work), Peshawar (frontier coordination), or Rangoon (Burma affairs) when specific tasks required.

== Salary and posts ==
Imperial Secretariat Service was classified into Class I and Class II.

- Central Government
  - Under Secretary to Government of India
  - Assistant Secretary to Government of India
  - Superintendent
  - Assistant Superintendent

== Notable members ==
Many members were receipients of orders of chivalry (Note: See V. P. Menon .) namely - Order of the Indian Empire, Order of the British Empire, Order of the Star of India and Knight Bachelor. They were also awarded the title of honor Rai Bahadur.

- V. P. Menon
- P. V. Gopalan
- Hari Sharma
- Prem Nath Kirpal
