= States Department =

Department of the government of India

The States Department, later States Ministry, was a department of the Government of India headed by the Minister of States. Its responsibility was to deal with the princely states and manage their relationship with independent India.

The department was formed in June 1947 to replace the Political Department of the British Government, which had administered relations between the British Crown and British India on the one side and the princely states on the other. The Political Department had exercised its power on the basis of paramountcy. Lord Mountbatten of Burma, the last Viceroy of India, proposed that a department that would replace the Political Department avoid that name, and instead call itself the States Department. Vallabhbhai Patel, who was to be the first home minister of India, was also made Minister of States. V.P. Menon was appointed the administrative head of the department.

The States Department had principal responsibility for bringing about the political integration of India by securing the accession of the princely states to India. Subsequently, it supervised the conduct of their affairs, their democratisation, and their administrative integration into India.

== Bibliography ==
- Hodson, H. V. (1969), The Great Divide: Britain, India, Pakistan, London: Hutchinson
- Menon, V. P. (1956), The Story of Integration of the Indian States (PDF), Orient Longman
