= Indian Civil Accounts Service =

Government of India Civil Service

Indian Civil Accounts Service (ICAS)
- Indian Civil Accounts Service

Service Overview
- Abbreviation: ICAS
- Formed: 1976
- Country: India
- Training Ground: National Institute of Financial Management, Faridabad Institute of Government Accounts and Finance, New Delhi
- Controlling Authority: Ministry of Finance, Government of India
- Minister Responsible: Nirmala Sitharaman
- Legal Personality: Governmental, Civil Service
- General Nature: Accounting and Finance

Service Chief
- Controller General of Accounts: Ms. T.C.A. Kalyani, ICAS

Head of the All India Civil Services
- Cabinet Secretary: T. V. Somanathan, IAS

The Indian Civil Accounts Service (ICAS; Hindi: भारतीय सिविल लेखा सेवा Bharatiya Civil Lekha Seva ) is one of the Civil Services of India. ICAS is under the Department of Expenditure in the Union Ministry of Finance. The service was created in 1976 with the purpose of separating the Auditing and Accounting functions of the Union Government with deputation and transfer from the Indian Audits and Accounts Service. Since 1977, personnel have been selected from the Civil Services Examination conducted by the Union Public Service Commission, like all other Central Civil Services.

== History ==
The Union Government introduced a major Public Financial Management reform in 1976 by separating audit and accounts functions, thereby relieving the Comptroller and Auditor General of India of the responsibility for preparing Union Government accounts and leading to the creation of the Indian Civil Accounts Service (ICAS), carved out from the Indian Audit & Accounts Service (IA&AS) through legislative changes including the Departmentalisation of Union Accounts (Transfer of Personnel) Act, 1976, which received Presidential assent on 8 April 1976 and was effective from 1 March 1976; as a result, ICAS observes 1 March as “Civil Accounts Day” every year, and the service was formally constituted in April 1977 as a specialised Group ‘A’ Central Service, marking a significant reform in modernising and strengthening financial management in the Government of India.

== Recruitment ==
Recruitment to the Indian Civil Accounts Service (ICAS) is primarily conducted through the Civil Services Examination held by the Union Public Service Commission (UPSC).

== Training ==
The training structure of the Indian Civil Accounts Service (ICAS) for UPSC-selected officers is conducted in three distinct phases.

Followed by the three month Foundational course happens in the LBSNAA, the Officer Trainees (OTs) then proceed to the following trainings:

- In the first phase, probationers are trained at the National Institute of Financial Management (NIFM) in Faridabad for about six months, which also includes an overseas exposure visit to understand global best practices in public financial management.
- The second phase takes place at the Institute of Government Accounts and Finance (INGAF) in New Delhi, where officers receive advanced instruction in government accounting systems, financial rules, and related procedures.
- In the final stage, officers undergo On-the-Job Training (OJT) in one of the Pay & Accounts Offices located across the country, gaining practical experience in day-to-day government accounting operations.

== Functions ==
The Controller General of Accounts (CGA), under the Allocation of Business Rules, 1961, is responsible for designing and maintaining a sound accounting system for departmentalized accounts and prescribing principles, systems, and formats of Government accounts. (S)He coordinates with the Budget Division and the Comptroller and Auditor General of India on accounting matters and issues instructions to Ministries/Departments regarding accounting procedures for receipts and payments. He also ensures accurate, comprehensive, and timely accounting information. The CGA has inspection powers to ensure proper maintenance of accounts and is the cadre controlling authority for Group ‘A’ and Group ‘B’ officers of the Indian Civil Accounts Service, responsible for cadre management and HR development.

Key functions include:

- Promoting management accounting systems in Ministries/Departments
- Reconciliation of Union Government cash balances with Reserve Bank of India (RBI).
- Consolidation of monthly accounts and preparation of Appropriation and Finance Accounts
- Coordination for Group ‘C’ and ‘D’ staff administration
- Conducting departmental examinations
- Revising Treasury Rules, Account Codes, and related financial rules

Additionally, the CGA oversees the Central Plan Scheme Monitoring System, tracking expenditure under Central Plan Schemes up to beneficiary level, ensuring proper fund utilization and monitoring.

== Career Progression ==
After joining the ICAS, the officer starts his/her career as an Assistant Controller of Accounts in the rank of Assistant Secretary to the Government of India. After 5 years, the first promotion takes place to the rank of Assistant Controller General of Accounts equivalent to Under Secretary. After 10 years, the officer is promoted to Controller of Accounts equivalent to Deputy Secretary. After 13 years, the officer is promoted to Senior Controller of Accounts equivalent to Director. After 19–21 years of service, the officer becomes Chief Controller of Accounts equivalent to the Joint Secretary. After 28–30 years of service, the officer attains the rank of Principal Chief Controller of Accounts equivalent to the Additional Secretary. After 34–35 years or more of service, the Appointments Committee of the Cabinet considers the officer for appointment to the rank of Controller General of Accounts equivalent to the rank of Secretary. In ICAS, officers spend more than 25 years of their service in New Delhi, as most Ministries and Departments are located there. In addition, they may have a few postings in state capitals, along with limited foreign assignments during their career.

=== Rank Structure ===
Ranks, designations, and positions held by Indian Civil Accounts Service officers in their career
Grade / Scale (Level on Pay Matrix)	Posting in Indian Civil Accounts Service	Position in Government of India	Position in Order of precedence in India	Pay Scale (Basic Pay)
Apex Scale (Pay Level 17)	Controller General of Accounts	Secretary	23	₹225,000 (US$2,300)
Higher Administrative Grade + (Pay Level 16)	Additional Controller General of Accounts	Additional Secretary	25	₹205,400 (US$2,100)—₹224,400 (US$2,300)
Higher Administrative Grade (Pay Level 15)	Principal Chief Controller of Accounts	Additional Secretary	25	₹182,200 (US$1,900)—₹224,100 (US$2,300)
Senior Administrative Grade (Pay Level 14)	Chief Controller of Accounts	Joint Secretary	26	₹144,200 (US$1,500)—₹218,200 (US$2,300)
Selection Grade (Pay Level 13)	Senior Controller of Accounts	Director		₹123,100 (US$1,300)—₹215,900 (US$2,200)
Junior Administrative Grade (Pay Level 12)	Controller of Accounts	Deputy Secretary		₹78,800 (US$820)—₹209,200 (US$2,200)
Senior Time Scale (Pay Level 11)	Assistant Controller General of Accounts	Under Secretary		₹67,700 (US$700)—₹208,700 (US$2,200)
Junior Time Scale (Pay Level 10)	Assistant Controller of Accounts Entry-level (Probationer)	Assistant Secretary		₹56,100 (US$580)—₹177,500 (US$1,800)
