= National Defence Academy and Naval Academy Examination =

Entrance examination conducted by the Union Public Service Commission of India

National Defence Academy & Naval Academy Examination
- Acronym: NDA/NA Exam
- Type: OMR sheet based (Pen & Paper)
- Administrator: Union Public Service Commission
- Skills tested: Writing, English, General knowledge, others
- Purpose: Selection of candidates to be commissioned officers in the Indian Army, Air Force, and Navy
- Year started: 1954 (72 years ago)
- Duration: Five hours (Mathematics: 2½ hours, General Ability Test (GAT): 2½ hours)
- Offered: Twice a year (April & September)
- Restrictions on attempts: 16½ years to 19½ years (age of the candidate)
- Regions: India
- Languages: English and Hindi
- Fee: ₹100 (US$1.00) (for General male candidates); Exempted for female, SC, ST and wards of JCO, NCO, OR
- Qualification rate: ≈ 4% (approx) for written examination
- Preferences offered: NDA (Army); NDA (Navy); (Navy Flying branch); (Air Force Flying branch); (Air Force Ground Duty); INA (Engineering)
- Website: www.upsc.gov.in

The National Defence Academy and Naval Academy Examination is an entrance examination conducted by the Union Public Service Commission (UPSC) twice a year for admissions into the National Defence Academy (NDA) and Indian Naval Academy (INA). The NDA Exam serves as a gateway for candidates seeking a career in the Indian Army, Navy, and Air Force.

== History ==
The NDA Exam was first conducted in the year 1954 after the NDA was established to train cadets from the Army, Navy, and Air Force together.

== Eligibility ==
To be eligible for the NDA Exam, candidates must meet the following criteria:

- Citizenship: Candidates must be Indian citizens.
- Age Limit: Candidates must be between 16.5 and 19.5 years of age.
- Educational Qualification: Candidates must have completed their 10+2 education from a recognized board or university.

== Examination Process ==
The NDA Exam is conducted in two stages: a written examination and an interview by the Services Selection Board (SSB).

=== Written Examination ===
The written examination consists of two papers: Mathematics and the General Ability Test (GAT). Both papers are objective type and are conducted on the same day. The Mathematics paper evaluates the candidates' mathematical aptitude, while the GAT paper assesses their English language proficiency, general knowledge, and reasoning abilities.

=== Services Selection Board Interview ===
Candidates who qualify in the written examination are called for the Services Selection Board (SSB) interview. The SSB interview consists of various stages, including intelligence and personality tests, group discussions, psychological tests, and personal interviews.

=== Administration ===
The NDA Exam is administered by the Union Public Service Commission (UPSC), which is a constitutional body responsible for recruiting personnel for various government services and posts. The UPSC ensures the fair and transparent conduct of the examination process, including the release of notifications, application acceptance, examination schedules, result declaration, and the final selection of candidates.

== Seat Share ==
The NDA/NA Examination, conducted twice annually by the UPSC, is the primary gateway to becoming an officer in the Indian Armed Forces, immediately after Class 12. The two NDA/NA examinations conducted in a year are referred to as: -

- NDA-I (April exam, course commences January of the next year)
- NDA-II (September exam, course commences July of the next year)

Each exam corresponds to a single course at the National Defence Academy, Khadakwasla, or the Indian Naval Academy, Ezhimala. Each exam typically ranges between 370 and 405 vacancies, depending on the manpower requirements projected by the Ministry of Defence. Collectively, this results in approximately 800 officer cadets entering the armed forces each year.

=== Vacancies Per Examination (2025 Cycle) ===
| Wing / Academy | Vacancies per Exam | Notes |
|---|---|---|
| Indian Army (NDA – Army Wing) | 208 | Largest share due to Army's vast officer cadre; includes 10 reserved seats for female candidates. |
| Indian Navy (NDA – Navy Wing) | 42 | Includes 5 seats for female cadets. |
| Indian Air Force (NDA – Air Force Wing) | 120 | Sub-divided into: • Flying Branch – 92 (2 female) • Ground Duties (Technical) – 18 (2 female) • Ground Duties (Non-Technical) – 10 (2 female) |
| Indian Naval Academy (INA – 10+2 Cadet Entry Scheme) | 36 | Separate pathway for cadets opting exclusively for the Navy; 4 seats for female candidates. |
| Total | 406 | Typically ranges between 370 and 405, depending on service requirements. |

=== Annual Cadet Induction (Approximate) ===
Annual Cadet Intake by Wing (Approx. 2025)
1. NDA (Army) 416 (51.2%)
2. NDA (Navy) 84 (10.3%)
3. NDA (Air Force) 240 (29.6%)
4. Indian Naval Academy (INA) 72 (8.87%)

==== Annual vacancies ====
| Wing / Academy | Annual Intake | Annual Intake (Male) | Annual Intake (Female) |
|---|---|---|---|
| Army (NDA) | 416 | 396 | 20 |
| Navy (NDA) | 84 | 74 | 10 |
| Air Force (NDA) | 240 | 228 | 12 |
| Indian Naval Academy (INA) | 72 | 64 | 8 |
| Total | 812 | 762 | 50 |
| Navy (comprehensive) | 156 | 138 | 18 |
