= Central Electrical and Mechanical Engineering Service =

- State Emblem of India

- Flag of India

The Central Electrical and Mechanical Engineering Service is a Central Civil Services Group-A Gazetted technical post of the Government of India. It comes under the Central Public Works Department, of the Ministry of Urban Development.

== Hierarchy ==
Grade	Designation in the field	Designation in Headquarters	Basic pay
Apex Scale (Pay level 17)	Nil	Secretary / Head of Department	₹225,000 (US$2,300)
Higher Administrative Grade (+) (Pay level 16)	Director General / Additional Director General	Member (Engineering), Board / Equivalent	₹205,400 (US$2,100)—₹224,400 (US$2,300)
Higher Administrative Grade (Pay level 15)	Chief Engineer (HAG)	Additional Member / Chief Engineer (HQ)	₹182,200 (US$1,900)—₹224,100 (US$2,300)
Senior Administrative Grade (Pay level 14)	Chief Engineer / Superintending Engineer (Senior)	Executive Director / Director (HQ)	₹144,200 (US$1,500)—₹218,200 (US$2,300)
Junior Administrative Grade (Functional) (Pay level 13)	Superintending Engineer / Deputy Chief Engineer	Director	₹123,100 (US$1,300)—₹215,900 (US$2,200)
Senior Time Scale (Non Functional) (Pay level 12)	Executive Engineer (Selection Grade)	Joint Director / Deputy Director	₹78,800 (US$820)—₹209.2 (US$2.20)
Senior Time Scale (Pay level 11)	Executive Engineer	Deputy Director / Under Secretary	₹67,700 (US$700)—₹208.7 (US$2.20)
Junior Time Scale (Pay level 10)	Assistant Executive Engineer	Assistant Director / Assistant Secretary	₹56,100 (US$580)—₹177.5 (US$1.80)
