= Indian Trade Service =

Federal government service in India

Service overview
Abbreviation	I.T.S.
Formed	1965 (CTS), 1985(ITS)
Country	India
Training ground	Indian Institute of Foreign Trade, New Delhi Attachments: Major ministries, ports, SEZs, industrial attachment, regional offices, NACEN, Centre for WTO studies
Controlling authority	Directorate General of Foreign Trade, Ministry of Commerce and Industry
Legal personality	Governmental, Civil Service
Preceding service	Central Trade Service
Cadre size	180

The Indian Trade Service (ITdS) is a civil service under Group A of the Central Civil Services of the executive branch of the Government of India. It was created as a specialized cadre to handle India's international trade and commerce on the basis of the recommendations of the Mathur Committee (Study Team on the Import and Export Trade Control Organization headed by Sri H.C. Mathur, Member of Parliament) in 1965. At present, the Directorate General of Foreign Trade (DGFT), under the Ministry of Commerce and Industry, is the cadre controlling authority of the ITS. DGFT has 38 regional offices across India, and plays a significant role in promoting India's international trade with its policy formulation and implementation.

The Department of Commerce is headed by a Secretary who is assisted by a Special Secretary & Financial Adviser, three Additional Secretaries, thirteen Joint Secretaries and Joint Secretary level officers and a number of other senior officers. Keeping in view the large increase in workload in matters related to World Trade Organization (WTO), Regional Trade Agreements (RTAs), free trade agreements (FTAs), Special Economic Zones (SEZs), joint study groups (JSGs) etc., two posts each of Joint Secretaries and Directors were created in the department during 2008–09.

The department is functionally organized into the following nine Divisions:

1. International Trade Policy Division
2. Foreign Trade Territorial Division
3. Export Products Division
4. Export Industries Division
5. Export Services Division
6. Economic Division
7. Administration & General Service Division
8. Finance Division
9. Supply Division

== Recruitment ==
The recruitment to Indian Trade Service is through Civil Services examinations conducted by UPSC. In addition, departmental candidates are also promoted as ITS through career progression.

== Role of Indian Trade Service ==
The main role of ITS officers can be divided into five parts:

1. Policy formulation in the area of International trade
2. Trade Policy implementation
3. Export promotion through various initiatives
4. International trade negotiations and commercial diplomacy
5. Miscellaneous and allied responsibilities

=== Policy formulation ===
ITS officers contribute to the making of International Trade Policy formulation for India. India's foreign trade policy (FTP) is a five-year policy document, revised midway after two and half years. The current foreign trade policy in effect is the FTP 2015–20. The foreign trade policy of India is a single document that strives to provide a stable and sustainable policy environment for foreign trade in both merchandise and services. It aims to help various sectors of Indian economy to gain global competitiveness.

Indian Trade Service officers are involved in formulation and drafting of the policy. They also provide key inputs from the field offices regarding international trade matters which is subsequently taken up for review while making of the policy.

Apart from making the trade policy for the country, ITS officers also involve themselves in coordinating with various other ministries for taking stands on trade matters at international forums such as World Trade Organisation. For this purpose, there is a WTO cell at the Directorate General of foreign Trade. In addition, coordination for board of trade for inter state and central government consultation in the area of international trade policy formulation is also managed by ITS officers.

There has been a study by Frost and Sullivan recently where it has been recommended that role of ITS officers may be increased further in the area of policy formulation in coming future.

=== Trade Policy Implementation ===
Foreign Trade Policy of India is implemented in the country through 38 field offices of DGFT, commonly known as Regional Authorities (RAs). These field offices are staffed and headed by ITS officers who facilitate international trade from India. In addition many Special Economic Zones are also headed by ITS officers. Under current Foreign Trade Policy of India, the gamut of implementation includes:

- Implementation of export from India schemes - for both merchandise and services exports
- Implementation of Duty nullification schemes for export products
- Implementation of Export promotion capital goods scheme
- Refund schemes for various deemed exports
- Heading committee on quality complaints and trade disputes - to act as arbiter and enforcer of rules in international commercial disputes
- Acting as quasi-judicial authority in cases pertaining to Foreign Trade Development and Regulation Act 1992.
- Handling miscellaneous matters related to international trade such as issuing licenses for trading in sensitive/nuclear/defense related items

=== Export promotion thorough various initiatives ===
Indian trade service officers are involved in developing entrepreneurs in the area of international trade through various training and development initiatives. The initiatives are popularly known as 'Niryat Bandhu' initiatives which translates into 'Friends of exporters'. It is a part of push by Government of India under various schemes such as 'Skill India' and 'Make in India'. Under Niryat Bandhu scheme, ITS officers undertake various development activities such as:

- Development of training modules - text, videos and presentations
- Live training and interactions with budding entrepreneurs in the area of international trade
- One to One counselling with new entrepreneurs and officers from Indian Trade Service
- Active hand-holding of entrepreneurs from launch of the project until the first export consignment
- Association with various export promotion bodies and state agencies for training and development
- Documenting lessons learnt for future use of new entrepreneurs

In addition, officers in the field level conduct policy level studies for providing inputs for future policy making in the area for export promotion.

=== International trade and diplomacy ===
- Conducting trade policy negotiations for India at the multilateral forum of the World Trade Organization. ITS officers, as part of various delegations from department of commerce, and also as part of various negotiation teams, have been representing India at various WTO forums.
- ITS officers are playing a key role in trade negotiations with various countries. They are important part of the negotiation team representing India at various Free Trade Agreements and Preferential Trade Agreements.
- ITS officers man positions at select international bodies such as UNESCAP, WTO etc. where they either work for the international organizations or represent the country at such forums.

=== Miscellaneous and allied responsibilities ===
- ITS officers are currently posted in Directorate General of Anti-Dumping as investigating officers for anti-dumping cases. They recommend anti-dumping duties under WTO rules after completing investigations.
- On encadered positions in various ministries such as ministry of external affairs and ministry of agriculture.
- As development commissioners at various Special Economic Zones of India.
- As directors of foreign trade at ministry of commerce.
- ITS officers in field act as conduit between state government initiatives and central government schemes by acting as local advisors in policy matters.

== Career progression and other roles of ITS officers ==
Career progression chart for ITS officers
Grade	Position/Role	Years of service
Addl Director General of Foreign Trade (JS level)	Policy makers in the area of international trade. Heads of Zones. Development commissioners at various special economic zones etc.	19th year onwards
Jt. Director General of Foreign Trade - Director scale	Providing inputs for policy making at department of commerce and DGFT. Heading various field offices of DGFT. Handling responsibilities at various multilateral and international organizations. Part of key negotiation teams at international forums in the matter of trade.	14 year onwards
Joint Director General of Foreign Trade	Field postings at DGFT field offices, implementing foreign trade policy of India, Export promotion activities, providing policy inputs for policy making in the area of international trade, Interacting with state governments, export promotion bodies, running training programs. At department of commerce, acting as key players in negotiation teams, as investigating officer for anti-dumping investigations and at various divisions of department of commerce. Part of policy making if posted at DGFT headquarters.	9th year to 14th year
Deputy Director General of Foreign Trade	Field postings at DGFT field offices, implementing foreign trade policy of India, Export promotion activities, providing policy inputs for policy making in the area of international trade, Interacting with state governments, export promotion bodies, running training programs. At department of commerce, acting as part of negotiation team at international level, as investigating officer for anti-dumping investigations and at various divisions of department of commerce	4th year to 9th year
Assistant Director General of Foreign Trade	Probation, training and posting at field offices (RAs) of DGFT, Department of commerce	Initial
