= Central Geological Service =

Indian government service

Service Overview
Abbreviation	CGS
Formed	2010
Headquarters	Geological Survey of India (GSI)-Central Headquarters (CHQ), Kolkata
Country	India
Training Ground	Geological Survey of India Training Institute (GSITI), Hyderabad
Controlling Authority	Ministry of Mines, Government of India
General Nature	Governmental, Natural Resources
Cadre Size	2700-3500

Service Chief
- Smt. Varsha Ashok Aglawe, Director General

Head of the Civil Services
- Cabinet Secretary; Current: Rajiv Guaba IAS

In September, 2010, the geology stream of the Geological Survey of India (GSI), was constituted as 'Central Geological Service' and commonly referred as Central Geological Service (CGS) (केन्द्रीय भूवैज्ञानिक सेवा). The Central Geological Service (CGS) is one of the central natural resource services which is part of the executive branch of the Government of India. The Central Geological Service (formerly Geology stream of GSI) was constituted as an Organized Group ‘A’ Gazetted Service as per DOPT OM No. I-11019/12/2008-CRD dated 19/11/2009 by the Cadre Controlling Authorities.

GSI is organized group 'A' service since 1982 as per DoPT O.M.No.5/12/79-PP-II dated 31.07.1982 and schedule -I. Its number of vacancies and details of the examination are notified on the website of UPSC (www.upsc.gov.in).

The Officers of Central Geological Service (CGS) are recruited by Union Public Service Commission (UPSC) and posted to the Geological Survey of India (GSI). It is an esteemed geological organization officially formed in 1851 by British East India Company. It is a central government organisation in India working as an Attached Office to the Ministry of Mines, Government of India to carry out geological surveys, mineral exploration and allied studies.

== Hierarchy ==
Grade	Designation in the field	Designation in Headquarters	Basic pay
Apex Scale (Pay level 17)	Director General	Secretary / Head of Organisation	₹225,000 (US$2,300)
Higher Administrative Grade (+) (Pay level 16)	Additional Director General (Geology)	Additional Secretary	₹205,400 (US$2,100)—₹224,400 (US$2,300)
Higher Administrative Grade (Pay level 15)	Additional Director General	Additional Secretary	₹182,200 (US$1,900)—₹224,100 (US$2,300)
Senior Administrative Grade (Pay level 14)	Deputy Director General	Joint Secretary	₹144,200 (US$1,500)—₹218,200 (US$2,300)
Junior Administrative Grade (Functional) (Pay level 13)	Director (Geology)	Director	₹123,100 (US$1,300)—₹215.9 (US$2.20)
Senior Time Scale (Non Functional) (Pay level 12)	Superintending Geologist	Deputy Director	₹78,800 (US$820)—₹209.2 (US$2.20)
Senior Time Scale (Pay level 11)	Senior Geologist	Under Secretary	₹67,700 (US$700)—₹208.7 (US$2.20)
Junior Time Scale (Pay level 10)	Geologist	Assistant Secretary	₹56,100 (US$580)—₹177.5 (US$1.80)

=== Assessment of suitability for promotion and posting ===
The performance of CGS officers is assessed through an Annual Performance Appraisal Report (APAR). The report is compiled annually and is initiated by the officers themselves, designated as the Reporting Officer, who lists out their achievements, completion of assigned activities and targets for the year. The report is then modified and commented by the Reviewing Officer, usually the superior of the Reviewing Officer. Reports submitted for CGS officers are forwarded by the Reviewing Officer to the Accepting Authority, who will conduct a final review of the report.
