= V. P. Menon =

Indian civil servant (1893–1965)

Acting Governor of Odisha
- In office 6 May 1951 – 17 July 1951
- Preceded by: Asaf Ali
- Succeeded by: Asaf Ali

Secretary to the Government of India in the Ministry of the States
- In office 1947–1951
- Succeeded by: C. S. Venkatachar

Constitutional Adviser and Political Reforms Commissioner to Viceroy of India
- In office 1942–1947
- Preceded by: Harry Hodson
- Succeeded by: Abolished

Personal details
- Born: Vappala Pangunni Menon; 30 September 1893 Ottapalam, Malabar District, Madras Presidency, British Raj (Present day Palakkad district, Kerala)
- Died: 31 December 1965 (aged 72), Cooke Town, Bangalore, Mysore State (now Karnataka)
- Spouse(s): Rita Menon (div.); Kanakamma Kunnathidathil
- Children: Anantan Menon and Sankaran Menon
- Occupation: Civil servant

Vappala Pangunni Menon (Malayalam: [ʋaːpːaːlɐ puŋɡuɳːi menoːn]) CSI CIE (30 September 1893 – 31 December 1965) was an Indian civil servant who served as Secretary to the Government of India in the Ministry of the States, under Sardar Patel to integrate 562 princely states. By appointment from Viceroy and Governor-General of India Wavell, he also served as Secretary to the Governor-General (Public) and later as Secretary to the Interim Government of India (Cabinet). He also was the Constitutional Adviser and Political Reforms Commissioner to the last three successive Viceroys (Note: Linlithgow, Wavell and Mountbatten.) during British rule in India.

In May 1948, at the initiative of V. P. Menon, a meeting was held in Delhi between the Rajpramukhs of the princely unions and the States Department, at the end of which the Rajpramukhs signed new Instruments of Accession which gave the Government of India the power to pass laws in respect of all matters that fell within the seventh schedule of the Government of India Act 1935.

He played a vital role in India's partition and political integration. Later in his life, he became a member of the free-market–oriented Swatantra Party. He was a member of the Imperial Secretariat Service.

== Early life and career ==
The son of a school headmaster Chunangad Shankara Menon, in Kerala, Pangunni Menon worked as a railway stoker, coal miner and Bangalore tobacco company clerk. He dropped out of formal education and never earned high school diploma or a college degree.

Menon joined the Imperial Secretariat Service and served as Superintendent in the Reforms Office with effect from 15 May 1930. He later served as Assistant Secretary to the Government of India in the Reforms Office from 1933 to 1934. He subsequently served as Under Secretary from 1934 to 1935, Deputy Secretary from 1935 to 1940, Joint Secretary to the Government of India from 1941 to 1942. By working assiduously, encouraged by Edwin Montagu, Menon rose through the ranks to become the highest serving Indian officer in British India.

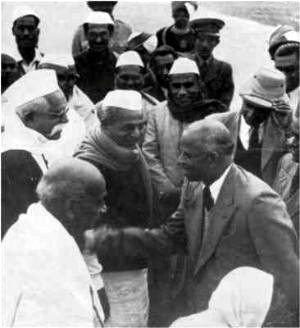
Vallabhbhai Patel and Menon received by the Governor and Chief Minister of the Central Provinces Ravishankar Shukla at Nagpur.

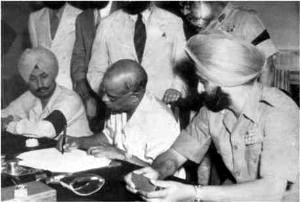
V. P. Menon signing the Patiala and East Punjab States Union covenant.

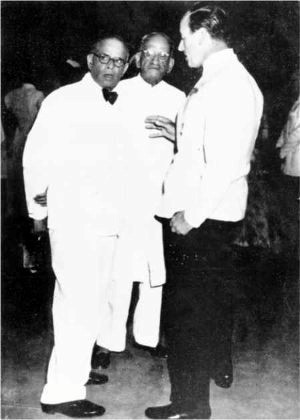
Lord Mountbatten, N. Gopalaswami Ayyangar and V.P. Menon discussing the Hyderabad question at a party on 30 May 1948.

Menon served as Joint Secretary to the Simla Conference in June 1945. In 1946, he was appointed Political Reforms Commissioner to the British Viceroy.

== India and his contributions ==
=== Instrument of Accession ===
Menon was the political advisor of the last Viceroy of India, Lord Louis Mountbatten. When the interim Government had collapsed due to the rivalry between the Indian National Congress and the Muslim League, Menon had proposed to Mountbatten, Jawaharlal Nehru and Sardar Vallabhbhai Patel, the Indian leaders, the Muslim League's plan to partition India into two independent nations - India and Pakistan. Menon drafted the Instrument of Accession, a legal document that allowed princely states to accede to either India or Pakistan. This was crucial in bringing many states, like Bikaner and Baroda, into the Indian union.

Menon's resourcefulness during this period caught the eye of Sardar Patel, who would become the Deputy Prime Minister of India in 1947. He became the envoy to negotiate with the Maharajas.

V.P. Menon was present at the meeting between Lord Mountbatten and Hanwant Singh, Maharaja of Jodhpur. It was at this meeting that Hanwant Singh signed the instrument of accession to India. After he had signed and the Viceroy Mountbatten left, only Menon remained was in the room with the Maharaja. The Maharaja took out a .22 calibre pistol and pointed it at Menon and said "I refuse to take your dictation". Menon told him that he would be making a very serious mistake by threatening him and would not be able to get the accession abrogated in any case.

=== Junagadh ===
In August 1947, the Nawab of Junagadh—a Muslim ruler presiding over a predominantly Hindu state surrounded by Indian territory—signed the Instrument of Accession with Pakistan, becoming the first princely state to do so. India strongly objected to this decision, arguing that Junagadh’s accession to Pakistan violated both geographic contiguity and the will of its Hindu-majority population. India responded by imposing a blockade, instigating political instability, and facilitating defections among local vassal states to accede to India. Eventually, administrative control passed to India when Junagadh’s rulers sought intervention amid unrest, followed by a plebiscite in February 1948, in which over 99.9% voted to join India, leading to its formal annexation and merger into Saurashtra State.

As Secretary of the States Department, V. P. Menon was deeply involved in the diplomatic and legal maneuvers surrounding Junagadh’s accession. On 17 September 1947, just after Pakistan accepted Junagadh’s accession, he visited the state to deliver India’s protest directly to Sir Shah Nawaz Bhutto, the Dewan, insisting that the accession be retracted—though Bhutto cited international law to claim its validity. Menon also worked behind the scenes to mobilize local leaders, including journalists and activists like Samaldas Gandhi, supporting the formation of a provisional government ("Arziee Hukumat"), which amplified internal dissent against the Nawab’s decision. His negotiations and legal framing laid the groundwork for India to assert control over Junagadh, culminating in India's formal administration takeover and the 1948 plebiscite.

=== Hyderabad ===
Following Indian independence in August 1947, the Nizam of Hyderabad—Mir Osman Ali Khan—refused to join either India or Pakistan and declared Hyderabad an independent sovereign state, hoping to continue under British suzerainty despite being surrounded by Indian territory and ruled over a predominantly Hindu population. India insisted Hyderabad accede, citing geographic contiguity and internal security. A Standstill Agreement signed in November 1947 temporarily extended administrative relations but notably did not allow Indian troops into the state, fearing that Hyderabad was using the interval to strengthen its position and build ties with Pakistan-backed militias known as the Razakars. As lawlessness grew and the Razakars began terrorizing the populace, India launched Operation Polo ("police action") in September 1948. Within five days, the Indian Army secured Hyderabad, the Nizam capitulated on 17 September, and a plebiscite was avoided—Hyderabad was formally integrated into India. The aftermath saw widespread communal violence; official estimates cite 30,000–40,000 civilian deaths, while other accounts put the toll closer to 200,000.

As Secretary of the States Department, V. P. Menon played a central strategic and legal role in managing the Hyderabad situation. He was responsible for drafting and negotiating the Standstill Agreement, working alongside Sardar Patel and Mountbatten to ensure it preserved India’s right over defence, external affairs, and communications—or at least delayed formal accession until a resolution could be found. Menon’s framing allowed India to legally restrict Hyderabad’s freedom, anticipating potential internal disturbances. Behind the scenes, he coordinated diplomatic pressure, economic isolation, and contingency planning that preceded the decision for police action when negotiation failed and Razakar violence escalated. While avoidance of bloodshed was attempted through diplomacy, Menon supported military planning as a last resort—operation Polo unfolded decisively following his legal groundwork and strategic planning.

=== Tripura Merger Agreement ===
Menon signed the agreement on behalf of the Governor General. The agreement took effect on October 15, 1949.

=== Jammu and Kashmir ===
On 25 October, V.P. Menon arrived at Srinagar to assess the situation of Kashmir and advised Maharaja Hari Singh to proceed to Jammu as invaders were very close to Srinagar. Maharaja Hari Singh left from Srinagar to Jammu on the same night. V.P. Menon along with Mehr Chand Mahajan (Prime Minister J&K) left for New Delhi by air on the morning of 26 October. On arriving at New Delhi, Lord Mountbatten assured militarily intervention in J&K only after instrument of accession were signed. V.P. Menon then left from New Delhi to Jammu by air on the afternoon of 26 October, secured signature on the legal documents, returning that evening by air to New Delhi. The next day, on 27 October Lord Mountbatten accepted the accession of the Princely State of Jammu & Kashmir to India and Indian Army landed on Srinagar airport on the same day.

== Later years ==
After his stint as Secretary, he was Governor of Odisha (Orissa then) for a short period in 1951. He authored a book on the political integration of India, The Story of the Integration of Indian States and on the partition of India, Transfer of Power. He later joined the Swatantra Party, but never contested the elections. Menon died on 31 December 1965 at the age of 72.

== Honors and awards ==
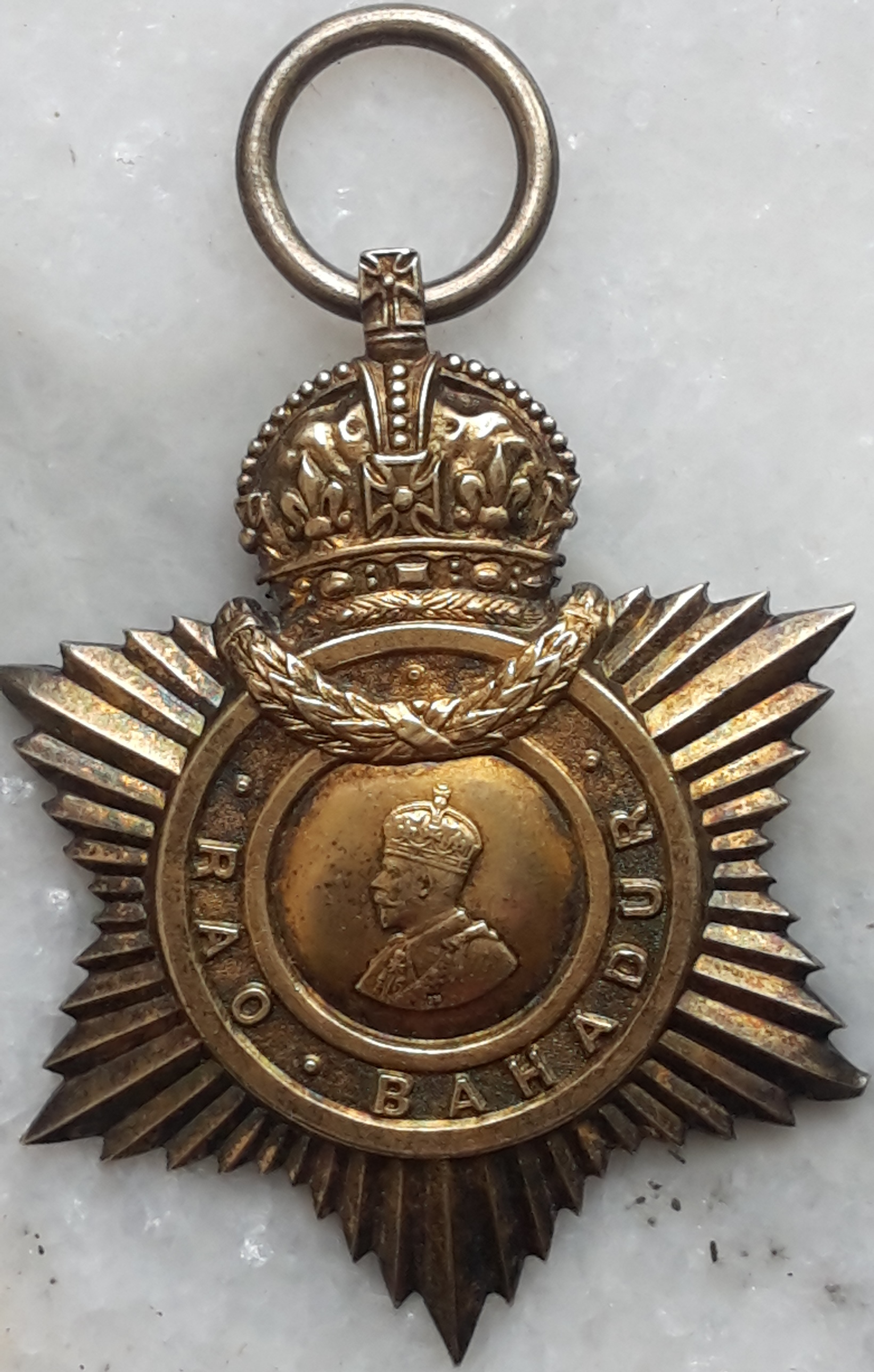
- Rao Bahadur (accepted).
- Companion of the Order of the Indian Empire (accepted).
- Companion of the Order of the Star of India (accepted).
- Knight Commander of the Order of the Star of India (declined).

Menon was given the title of Rao Bahadur, appointed a CIE in the 1941 Birthday Honours and a CSI in the 1946 Birthday Honours. He was offered a knighthood as a Knight Commander of the Order of the Star of India (KCSI) in a final imperial honours list in 1948, but refused. In a formal statement to the outgoing British authorities, Menon declined the knighthood, stating that with Indian independence, he had entered the service of the new Indian government. According to his grandson, however, Menon later privately told his daughter-in-law he could not accept a knighthood for having caused the partition of his country.

== Personal life ==
In Patrick French's India: A Portrait, a biographical book on the Indian Subcontinent, it is mentioned that V.P. Menon moved in with his Keralite friends after his wife left him and returned to south India. The two friends, who were a couple, had arranged his marriage and helped raise his two sons – Pangunni Anantan Menon and Pangunni Shankaran Menon. When the husband died, Menon married his widow.

== In popular culture ==
Indian actor Ashish Vidyarthi portrayed Menon in the 1993 film Sardar, based on the life of Indian statesman Vallabhbhai Patel. In Pradhanmantri, a television political documentary series, Adi Irani plays as Menon.

In 2024 historical hindi series Freedom at Midnight also specifying V.P. Menon's contributions.

== Bibliography ==
- Menon, V.P (1956), The Story of the Integration of the Indian States, Orient Longman Ltd, Madras
- Menon, V.P (1957), The Transfer of Power in India, Orient Longman Ltd, Madras
