= Combined Defence Services Examination =

Indian Armed Forces examination

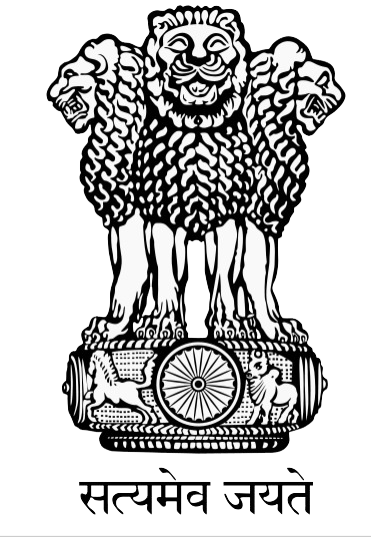
- Acronym: CDS
- Type: Paper-based
- Administrator: Union Public Service Commission
- Skills tested: English, general knowledge, elementary mathematics
- Purpose: Recruiting officer cadets for Indian Armed Forces
- Duration: 6 hours 4 hours (OTA)
- Score range: 0 - 300; 0 - 200 (OTA)
- Offered: Twice a year
- Restrictions on attempts: unlimited
- Regions: India
- Languages: English
- Annual number of test takers: 1,000,000+
- Prerequisites: Graduation
- Fee: ₹200 (US$2.10)
- Used by: IMA, OTA, AFA and, INA
- Qualification rate: 0.1%

The Combined Defence Services Examination (CDS) is a standardised test conducted annually by the Union Public Service Commission (UPSC) for recruitment of officer cadets in the Indian Military Academy (IMA), Officers Training Academy (OTA), Air Force Academy (AFA), and Indian Naval Academy (INA).

== Qualifications ==
The applications are invited every year in December and May, and examinations are conducted in April and September, respectively. Only unmarried graduates are eligible to sit for the exam. Examination is conducted twice a year. Successful candidates are admitted into the respective Academies after an interview conducted by the Services Selection Board (SSB). Eligibility criteria for the CDS examination include a minimum age limit of 19 years for the IMA and a maximum age limit of 24 years for the AFA, as of 1 January of the year of the examination. Candidates must have a graduate degree from a recognized university for all three services.

Officer jobs are available in the Indian Army, Navy, and Air Force after passing the Combined Defence Services Exam (CDS). Any student can take this exam after graduation. This exam has two steps. First, there is a written test and after passing it there is the SSB interview.

Indian Military Academy	19–24 years
Air Force Academy	20–24 years
Indian Naval Academy	19–24 years
Officers Training Academy	19–25 years

CDS Exam Educational Qualifications are given below.

For I.M.A. and Officers’ Training Academy	Degree from a recognized university or equivalent education
For Indian Naval Academy	Degree of Bachelor of Engineering (B.E.)/Bachelor of Technology (B.Tech.) from a recognized university or equivalent education
For Air Force Academy	Degree of a recognized University (with Physics and Mathematics at 10+2 level) or Bachelor of Engineering/Bachelor of Technology

== Personality test ==
The SSB interview process consists of a two-stage Selection process – stage I and stage II. Only those candidates who successfully clear the Stage I SSB interview will be permitted to appear for Stage II. All candidates who apply for the Air Force through more than one source will be interviewed/tested at the Air Force Board Selection only once.

== See also ==
- List of Public service commissions in India
