= Jamalpur Gymkhana =

India railway engineer school

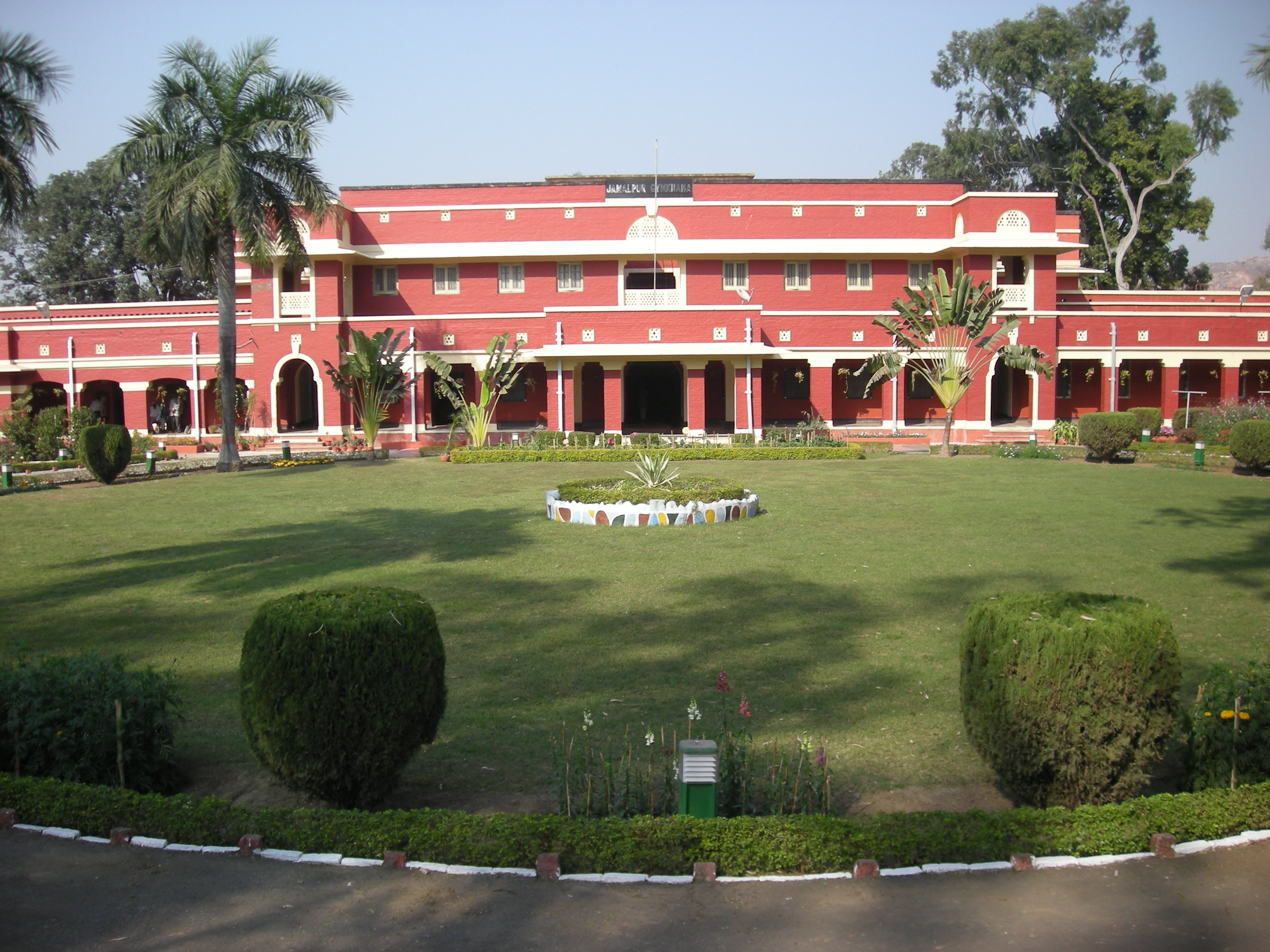
Jamalpur Gymkhana

The Jamalpur Gymkhana, often referred to as Gymkhana (or merely Gym) by its members, is a hostel for young apprentice officers of the Indian Railways in Jamalpur, Bihar, India. It is also a club like any other Gymkhana. The difference is that membership to this club is restricted only to those who spend their formative years in its corridors. It is difficult to talk about Gymkhana without quickly moving on to the anecdotal history of its members - current and past, referred to as Gymmies by its inmates.

== History ==
In the early 20th century, India faced a shortage of mechanical engineers in running a fast-growing rail system. The Indian Railways Institute of Mechanical and Electrical Engineering (IRIMEE), started in the year 1888 as Technical School. In the year 1927, the training of Mechanical Engineering Officers for Indian Railways commenced. It is the oldest of the six Centralised Training Institutes (CTIs) functioning for training of Officers of the Indian Railways. IRIMEE is located at Jamalpur in the Munger (spelled Monghyr, during the British rule of India) district of Bihar, on the Patna - Bhagalpur rail route.

IRIMEE conducts short term courses for Indian Railways Service of Mechanical Engineers (IRSME) Officers and other Organisations, 18 months training for IRSME Probationary Officers and four years undergraduate programme for the Special Class Apprentices (called SCAs or SCRAs for Special Class Railway Apprentices).

The 'Special Class Railway Apprentices' (SCRAs) stay at the Jamalpur Gymkhana during the four years when they undergo training as undergraduate engineers. They have been doing so since 1929 when the Gymkhana was built. But in 2015, Railways decided to close down this examination after UPSC communicated that it was not inclined to continue conducting the examination.

== Life after graduation ==
Officers are assigned a Home Railway on completion of the course. This is the regional zone that will (usually) be where the officer will spend the first 4-8 (or more) years of the career.

The young officers go through an 18-month training and Bharat Darshan (Tour of India) to better understand, and designated as IRSME(P)/ ADME(P), with corresponding officers entering via IES exam:

- The span of the country and rail operations
- Functional breadth of the IRSME job role
  - Motive Power Availability
  - Train Operations - Scheduling
  - Production of Locomotives, Coaches, Wagons, Wheel sets, etc.
  - Repair and Manufacturing workshops
- Laws and rules governing the Railways
- Business Processes and Standard Operating Procedures

On successful completion of this phase the officer is posted as an Astt. Div. Mech Engr (ADME). Depending on the posting, (s)he works directly under a SrDME or DME, or holds an independent charge. The officer may be posted to Zonal/Divisional HQs, Railway workshops, Diesel shed, Carriage/Wagon depots, or deputed to one of the Indian Railways companies. Having joined the service at a young age, the officers are likely to reach the top positions of the Railway Management.

== Distinguished alumni ==
International Honours

Batch	Name	Award
1958	R K Pachauri, on behalf of IPCC	Nobel Peace Prize

National Honours

Batch	Name	Award
1938	K L Bery	Padmashri
1941	A C Chatterjee	Padmashri
1944	P C Luther	Padmashri
1945	M M Suri	Padmashri
1947	M L Khanna	VSM (1971)
1947	P S Chaudhuri	VSM
1957	N C Sinha	Mentioned in Dispatches (1971)
1958	Rinkesh Verma	Padma Bhushan

== See also ==
- SCRA - Special Class Railway Apprentice - the official name by which a Gymmie is known
- IRSME - Indian Railway Service of Mechanical Engineers - a cadre of the Government of India
