= Ram Nath Adhikari =

Nepalese politician

Honourable Ram Nath Adhikari MP
- रामनाथ अधिकारी

Minister of Agriculture and Livestock Development of Nepal
- In office 15 July 2024 – 9 September 2025
- President: Ram Chandra Poudel
- Prime Minister: KP Sharma Oli
- Preceded by: Jwala Kumari Sah

Member of Parliament, Pratinidhi Sabha
- In office 22 December 2022 – 12 September 2025
- Preceded by: Khem Prasad Lohani
- Succeeded by: Bodh Narayan Shrestha
- In office May 1999 – May 2002
- Preceded by: Ganga Lal Tuladhar
- Succeeded by: Kalpana Dhamala
- Constituency: Dhading 2

Personal details
- Born: 3 September 1961 (age 64) Dhading District, Nepal
- Party: Nepali Congress

Ram Nath Adhikari (Nepali: रामनाथ अधिकारी) is a Nepalese politician. He was elected to the Pratinidhi Sabha in the 1999 election on behalf of the Nepali Congress.

In the 2022 Nepalese general election, he was elected as a member of the 2nd Federal Parliament of Nepal.
