= Indian locomotive class ZDM-2 =

Narrow gauge diesel hydraulic locomotives

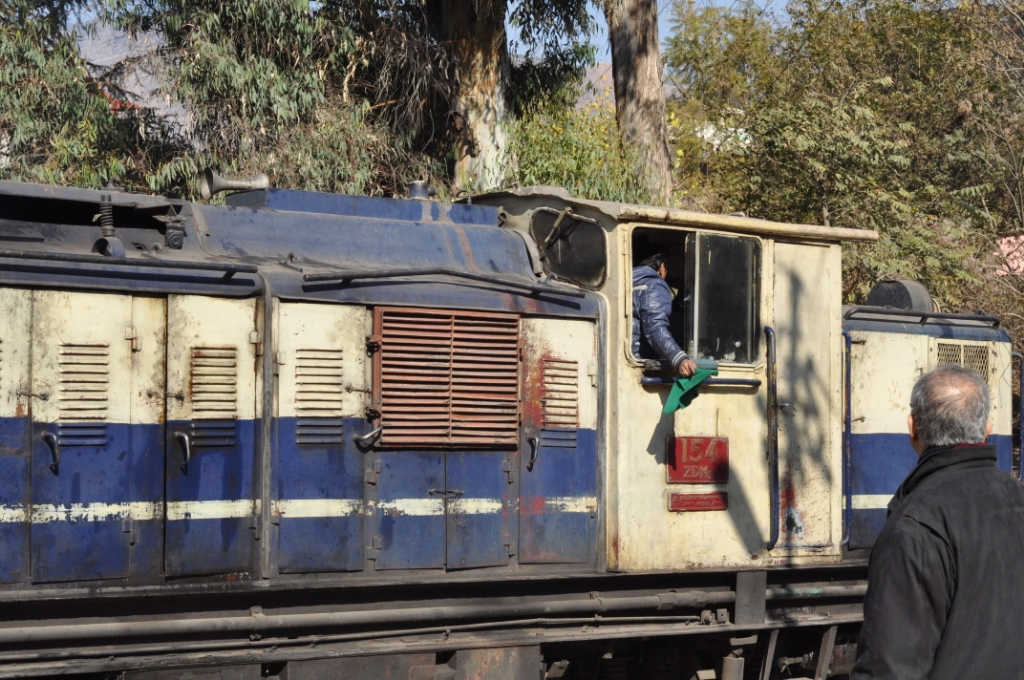
Type and origin
- Power type: Diesel-hydraulic
- Builder: Maschinenbau Kiel
- Serial number: 600478–600502
- Model: MaK G 700 BB
- Build date: 1964–January 1965
- Total produced: 25
- Rebuild date: 1980s–1990s
Specifications
- Configuration
  - UIC: B′B′
- Gauge: 762 mm (2 ft 6 in)
- Wheel diameter: 700 mm (27.6 in)
- Minimum curve: 30 m (98.4 ft)
- Length
  - Over couplers: 10,250 mm (404 in)
- Width: 2,260 mm (89.0 in)
- Height: 3,180 mm (125 in)
- Service weight: 32 t (31 long tons; 35 short tons)
- Prime mover: Maybach MD 435
- RPM
  - Maximum RPM: 1400 min⁻¹; 1700 min⁻¹
Performance figures
- Maximum speed: 50 km/h (31 mph)
- Power output: 650 PS (478 kW); 700 PS (515 kW)
Career
- Operators: Indian Railways
- Numbers: 123–147

The Indian locomotive class ZDM-2 is a series of narrow gauge diesel-hydraulic locomotives built for Indian Railways by the German company Maschinenbau Kiel. In the 1980s and 1990s, several of the type were fitted with KPC engines, these were reclassified as the ZDM-2R.

== History ==
The ZDM-2 class was designed and manufactured by Maschinenbau Kiel (MaK). The type was specially developed for the Indian 762 mm railway lines. Locomotive No 600488 was tested on the Kreisbahn Osterode-Kreiensen 750 mm gauge railway line before delivery. The class was initially used on the Kalka–Shimla Railway and the Kangra Valley Railway, then later in Nagpur. On the Kalka-Shimla line, ten ZDM-2 locomotives partly replaced the ageing steam locomotives and partly the inefficient and failure-prone ZDM-1 diesel locomotives for passenger transport. On the Kalka–Shimla line, ZDM-1 locomotives pulled only three passenger coaches, while ZDM-2 locomotives often pulled seven. The ZDM-2 and ZDM-1 locomotives that remained on the line were completely replaced by ten ZDM-3 locomotives delivered between 1970 and 1972, the former being transferred to the South Eastern Railway in 1971–1972 and the latter to the Matheran Hill Railway in 1976. The ZDM-2s were fitted with a hydraulic transmission of the Indian "Suri" type, which proved to be highly failure-prone. The series was equipped with the Maybach "MD 435" diesel engine. On the first ten units these operated at the speed of 1400 min⁻¹ for a power output of 650 metric horsepower (478 kW), while on the latter fifteen at 1700 min⁻¹ for a power output of 700 metric horsepower (515 kW).

Several members of the type were modified in the 1980s and 1990s; they were fitted with KPC hydraulic transmissions and MaK diesel engines.

== Locomotive list ==
List of MaK G 700 BB locomotives
Serial number	Year of production	Operating number	Operator	Notes
600478	1964	123	1964–1971/72: NR, 1971/72–?: SER	Scrapped
600479	1964	124	1964–1971/72: NR, 1971/72–?: SER	Scrapped
600480	1964	125	1964–1971/72: NR, 1971/72–?: SER	Scrapped
600481	1964	126	1964–1971/72: NR, 1971/72–?: SER	Scrapped
600482	1964	127	1964–1971/72: NR, 1971/72–?: SER	Scrapped
600483	1964	128	1964–1971/72: NR, 1971/72–?: SER	Scrapped
600484	1964	129	1964–1971/72: NR, 1971/72–?: SER	Scrapped
600485	1964	130	1964–1971/72: NR, 1971/72–?: SER	Scrapped
600486	1964	131	1964–1971/72: NR, 1971/72–?: SER	Scrapped
600487	1965	132	1965–1971/72: NR, 1971/72–?: SER	In the 1980s or 1990s, it received a new transmission and engine. Preserved at the Jamalpur Locomotive Workshop
600488	1964	133	SER	It was tested on the Kreisbahn Osterode-Kreiensen before being delivered. In the 1980s or 1990s, it received a new transmission and engine. Scrapped
600489	1964	134	SER	Scrapped
600490	1964	135	SER	Scrapped
600491	1964	136	SER	Plinthed at Nagpur Narrow Gauge Rail Museum
600492	1964	137	SER	Scrapped
600493	1964	138	SER	Scrapped
600494	1964	139	SER	In the 1980s or 1990s, it received a new transmission and engine. Scrapped
600495	1964	140	SER	In the 1980s or 1990s, it received a new transmission and engine. Scrapped
600496	1964	141	SER	Scrapped
600497	1964	142	SER	Scrapped
600498	1964	143	SER	Scrapped
600499	1964	144	SER	Scrapped
600500	1964	145	SER	Scrapped
600501	1964	146	SER	In the 1980s or 1990s, it received a new transmission and engine. Scrapped
600502	1964	147	SER	Scrapped
