= Basumaya Tamang =

Nepalese Politician

The Honourable Basumaya Tamang
- बासुमाया तामाङ

Member of Parliament, Pratinidhi Sabha
- Incumbent
- Assumed office 27 March 2026
- Constituency: PR

Personal details
- Born: 1972 (age 53–54) Rubi Valley, Dhading, Nepal
- Citizenship: Nepali
- Party: Rastriya Swatantra Party
- Education: Padma Kanya Multiple Campus (Intermediate of Arts)
- Profession: Politician; Entrepreneur

Basumaya Tamang (Nepali: बासुमाया तामाङ) is a Nepalese politician and entrepreneur who has been serving as a member of parliament from the Rastriya Swatantra Party. She is a member of 7th Pratinidhi Sabha elected through Proportional Representation under the Janajati female cluster in the 2026 general election. Besides politics, she is a successful businesswoman and owns the 'Nepali Mann' industry.

== Early life and education ==
Tamang was born in Rubi Valley, Dhading of Bagmati Province, Nepal on 1972. She belongs to the Tamang ethnic group of Nepal. She moved to Kathmandu at an early age to provide a better livelihood for her children and family. She completed Intermediate of Arts from the Padma Kanya Multiple Campus, Kathmandu.

== Professional life ==
She started a business in 2008 named 'Nepali Mann'. She is one of the leading businesswomen producing timur chhop. Her business employed around 150 people, directly or indirectly.

== Politics ==
She has been a founding member of the Rastriya Swatantra Party since 2022. She currently serves as the party's joint treasurer and a member of the secretariat. She contested the 2022 Nepalese general election from Dhading 2 but lost to Ramnath Adhikari of the Nepali Congress.

== Electoral performance ==
Election	Year	Constituency	Contested for	Political party	Result	Votes	% of votes
Nepal general election	2022	Dhading 2	Pratinidhi Sabha member	Rastriya Swatantra Party	Lost	5,569	8.39%
