= Lohani (surname) =

Lohani (or Lohumi) is a surname found among Kanyakubja Brahmins of Kumaon in Uttarakhand, India and among Bahuns (Hill Brahmins) and Chhetris in Nepal. It derives from the village of Lohana in Almora district, Uttarakhand.

Originally Pandey Brahmins of Kannauj and Upadhyay Brahmins of Banda in Uttar Pradesh, India, they migrated to the hills of Uttarakhand in the 15th and 16th-centuries and settled in Lohana village. Later some members of the community also migrated to Nepal.

Notable people with the name include:

- Ashwani Lohani (born 1958), Indian bureaucrat, former CEO of Air India, former Railway Board chairman of India; hails from Almora district
- Govind Prasad Lohani (1927–2020), Nepalese economist and diplomat
- Indra Lohani, Nepalese lawyer and talk show host
- Khem Prasad Lohani, Nepali politician and a member of the House of Representatives
- Paresh Lohani (born 1980), Nepalese cricketer
- Prakash Chandra Lohani, Nepalese politician and economist
- Siddhant Lohani, Nepalese cricketer
- Vinayak Lohani, Indian social worker, founder of Parivaar, a humanitarian institution based in West Bengal, India; his family roots are from Almora district
