= Indian Railway Service of Mechanical Engineering =

Railway engineering department in India

Service overview
- Abbreviation: IRSME
- Founded: 1888; 138 years ago
- Country: India
- Training Institute: Indian Railways Institute of Mechanical and Electrical Engineering, Jamalpur
- Cadre controlling authority: Member (Traction & Rolling Stock), Ministry of Railways, Government of India
- Minister responsible: Ashwini Vaishnaw, Minister of Railways, Communication and IT
- Legal personality: Governmental; Engineering
- Cadre strength: about 1700 members
- Selection: Engineering Services Examination and Special Class Railway Apprentice Examination (UPSC)
- Notable Alumni: Ashwani Lohani (former CRB), Rajendra K. Pachauri (on behalf of IPCC) (Nobel Peace Prize)

Head of Department
- Member Traction and Rolling Stock: R. Rajagopal,IRSME

The Indian Railway Service of Mechanical Engineering (IRSME) is one of the group 'A' central engineering services of the Indian railways. The officers of this service are responsible for managing the Mechanical Engineering Division of the Indian Railways. Till 2019, IRSME officers were drawn from the Engineering Services Examination (ESE) and Special Class Railway Apprentice(SCRA)examination conducted by Union Public Service Commission. All appointments to the Group 'A' services are made by the president of India.

== Recruitment ==
There are two modes of recruitment to IRSME Group 'A':

- 25% through direct recruitment through the annual Engineering Services Examination conducted by UPSC.
- 25% through direct recruitment through the annual Special Class Railway Apprentice Examination conducted by UPSC.
- 50% through promotion from Group 'B' officers of Mechanical departments of the Zonal Railways.

Current cadre strength of IRSME officers is around 1700, serving in 68 divisions and 3 Production units across 17 Zonal Railways in India and the Railway Board.

Previous modes of recruitment included Engineering Services Examination conducted by the Union Public Services Commission. In 2020, Railways separated itself from Engineering Services Exam (ESE) and made it Indian Railway Management Services (IRMS).

The other exam was Special Class Railway Apprentice examination, also conducted by UPSC.

In 2022, the Indian Railway Management Services is merged into Civil Services examination.

== Training ==
After selection, the IRSME probationers report to their Centralized Training Institute (CTI): Indian Railways Institute of Mechanical and Electrical Engineering, Jamalpur, (IRIMEE) for joining formalities and induction into the cadre as Officer Trainees or Probationary Officers. This is followed by visit to a host of academies and institutions, over a period of next 78 weeks, to give wide-ranging exposure to officer trainees which would be useful in their career as railway officers. Some of these institutions include:

- Alma mater at Indian Railways Institute of Mechanical and Electrical Engineering, Jamalpur (IRIMEE)
- Railway Foundation and Induction Course at National Academy of Indian Railway (NAIR), Vadodara
- Marketing Management and Transport Economics at Indian Institute of Management (IIM)
- Ethical Governance Training at Initiatives of Change (IofC), Panchgani
- Metro Rail Training at Delhi Metro Rail Corporation (DMRC), New Delhi
- Signals and Tele-communications Training at Indian Railways Institute of Signal Engineering and Telecommunications (IRISET), Secundarabad
- P-Way, Works and Contract Management Training at Indian Railways Institute of Civil Engineering (IRICEN), Pune
- Locomotive, Rolling Stock and Workshop Management Training at Indian Railways Institute of Mechanical and Electrical Engineering (IRIMEE), Jamalpur
- Electric Traction and Railway Electrification Management Training at Indian Railways Institute of Electrical Engineering (IRIEEN), Nashik
- Railway Information Infrastructure Management Training at Centre for Railway information systems (CRIS), New Delhi
- Parliamentary Procedures Training at Bureau of Parliamentary Studies and Training (BPST), New Delhi
- Divisional attachments at 68 divisions spread across the length and breadth of the country
- Industrial Field visits – ICF, MCF, RCF and BLW
- Appreciation Visits to various Railway establishments situated in difficult terrains – Konkan Railways, K-K Line, Shimla-Kalka Toy Train, Nilgiri Railway, Udhampur-Srinagar
- Foreign attachment with Deutsche Bahn and Siemens Mobility in Germany

== Role and function ==
The main areas of responsibility

- Motive Power availability (Locomotive sheds)
- Crew Management (Locomotive operations)
- Rolling Stock Management (Coaching depots, freight yards)
- Traffic restoration in case of accidents
- Production Units - Locomotives, Coaches, Wheel sets, etc.
- Repair and Manufacturing workshops

== Organisation ==
The IRSME is headed by a member rolling stock in the Railway Board (Ministry of Railways). Member rolling stock is better known by the acronym MRS.

In each of the zones the organisation is headed by a Principal Chief Mechanical Engineer. The PCME reports to the General Manager of the railway. The office of the Member Rolling Stock of the Railway Board guides the PCME on technical matters and policy.

The general managers of the Production Units report to the Railway Board. The production units are:

- Marathwada Rail coach factory, Latur
- Banaras Locomotive Works, Varanasi
- Chittaranjan Locomotive Works, Chittaranjan
- Patiala Locomotive Works, Patiala
- Integral Coach Factory, Chennai
- Rail Coach Factory, Kapurthala
- Modern Coach Factory, Raebareli
- Wheel & Axle Plant, Bangalore
- Rail Spring Karkhana, Gwalior
- Rail Wheel Plant, Bela, Chhapra.

== Hierarchy ==
Grade	Designation in the field	Designation in Headquarters	Basic pay
Apex Scale (Pay level 17)	Nil	Chairman & CEO, Railway Board Secretary	₹225,000 (US$2,300)
Higher Administrative Grade (+) (Pay level 16)	General Manager Additional Secretary	Member (Mechanical), Railway Board	₹205,400 (US$2,100)—₹224,400 (US$2,300)
Higher Administrative Grade (Pay level 15)	Principal Chief Mechanical Engineer	Additional Member, Railway Board Additional Secretary	₹182,200 (US$1,900)—₹224,100 (US$2,300)
Senior Administrative Grade (Pay level 14)	Divisional Railway Manager / Additional Divisional Railway Manager	Executive Director Joint Secretary	₹144,200 (US$1,500)—₹218,200 (US$2,300)
Junior Administrative Grade (Functional) (Pay level 13)	Senior Divisional Mechanical Engineer / Deputy Chief Mechanical Engineer	Director	₹123,100 (US$1,300)—₹215,900 (US$2,200)
Senior Time Scale (Non Functional) (Pay level 12)	Deputy Chief Mechanical Engineer	Joint Director Deputy Secretary	₹78,800 (US$820)—₹209,200 (US$2,200)
Senior Time Scale (Pay level 11)	Divisional Mechanical Engineer	Deputy Director Under Secretary	₹67,700 (US$700)—₹208,700 (US$2,200)
Junior Time Scale (Pay level 10)	Assistant Divisional Mechanical Engineer	Assistant Director Assistant Secretary	₹56,100 (US$580)—₹177,500 (US$1,800)

== Distinguished officers ==
Name	Batch	Honors	Remarks
K.L.Bery	1941	Padmashri	
A.C.Chatterjee	1944	Padmashri	
P.C.Luther	1947	Padmashri	
Z.I.Puri	1947	M. M., Pakistan Railway Board	
M.M.Suri	1948	Padmashri	In action in 1971
M.C.Khanna	1950	Vishisht Seva Medal	
P.S.Chaudhuri	1950	Vishisht Seva Medal	
H.N.Gupta	1959	1997 Man of the Year American Biographical Institute	
N.C.Sinha	1960	Vishisht Seva Medal	In action in 1971
Rajendra K. Pachauri	1961	Padma Vibhushan, Nobel Peace Prize (on behalf of IPCC)	
Ashwani Lohani	1978	Chairman and Managing Director, Air India	

== See also ==
- Jamalpur Gymkhana
- Centralised Training Institutes of the Indian Railways
- Indian Railways organisational structure
- Indian Engineering Service
