= Bodh Narayan Shrestha =

Nepalese Politician

- बोधनारायण श्रेष्ठ

Member of Parliament, Pratinidhi Sabha
- Incumbent
- Assumed office 26 March 2026
- Preceded by: Ram Nath Adhikari
- Constituency: Dhading 2

Personal details
- Citizenship: Nepalese
- Party: Rastriya Swatantra Party
- Education: Tribhuvan University (MRD)
- Profession: Politician

Bodh Narayan Shrestha (Note: Nepali: बोधनारायण श्रेष्ठ) is a Nepalese politician serving as a member of parliament from the Rastriya Swatantra Party. He is the member of the 7th Pratinidhi Sabha elected from Dhading 2 constituency in 2026 Nepalese General Election securing 26,145 votes and defeating Ramesh Prasad Dhamala of the Nepali Congress. He joined the leftist political movement during 2006 Nepalese revolution. He holds a master's degree in rural development from Tribhuvan University. He previously served at the United Nations agency UNICEF.
