= Lohani (disambiguation) =

Lohani may refer to:

== People ==
- Lohani, a Pashtun tribe
- Lohani (surname), an Indian surname
- Lohani, clan of the Mahuri, an Indian community traditionally engaged in the occupations as merchants, dairy farmers, and cultivators

== Animal ==
- Lohani (cattle), a breed of cattle from Pakistan

== See also ==
- Lohana, an Indian caste
