= Budhhiman Tamang =

Nepalese politician

The Honourable Buddhiman Tamang
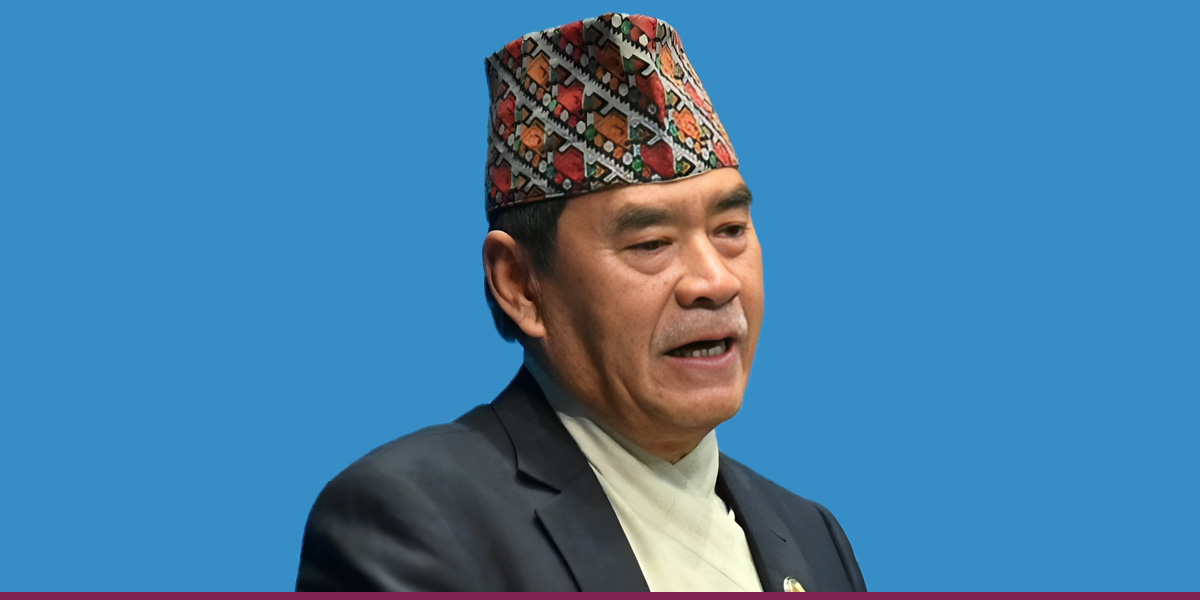

Member of Parliament, Pratinidhi Sabha for Rastriya Prajatantra Party

Ministry of Home Affairs (Nepal)
- In office 27 October 1997 – 3 December 1997
- Monarch: King Birendra Bir Bikram Shah Dev (Birendra of Nepal)
- Prime Minister: Surya Bahadur Thapa
- Preceded by: Bam Dev Gautam
- Succeeded by: Khum Bahadur Khadka

Personal details
- Born: Rubi Valley Rural Municipality, Dhading
- Party: Rastriya Prajatantra Party
- Spouse: Saraswati Lama
- Relations: Yoring Tamang (Brother); Khedi Maya Tamang (Sister); Ruppe Maya Tamang (Sister); Dambar Tamang (Brother)
- Parent(s): Father: Darjam Tamang; Mother: Urpa Maya Tamang
- Occupation: Politician

Buddhi Maan Tamang (also spelled Buddhiman Tamang) is a Nepalese politician and a member of the Rastriya Prajatantra Party (RPP). He belongs to Mamba Clan of Tamang Community. He He has held several public offices during his political career, including serving as the Minister of Home Affairs from 27 October 1997 to 3 December 1997 under Prime Minister Surya Bahadur Thapa; making him the first Home Minister from Tamang indigenous community. Since 2022, he has served as a Member of the House of Representatives of Nepal, elected through the proportional representation system from the Indigenous Peoples category. He has been active in Nepali politics for several decades and has represented the RPP in both parliamentary and national political affairs.

== Political career ==
Buddhiman Tamang began his political career as a member of the Rastriya Prajatantra Party (RPP) and emerged as one of its senior leaders. During his decades-long political career, he served in several ministerial positions in the Government of Nepal under different prime ministers. He served as Minister of Home Affairs from 7 October 1997 to 15 April 1998 under Prime Minister Surya Bahadur Thapa. During his political career, he also held the portfolios of Minister of Local Development, Minister of General Administration, Minister of Water Resources, Minister of Physical Planning and Works, and Minister of Industry, Commerce and Supplies in different governments.
Tamang represented the Rastriya Prajatantra Party in Nepal's Parliament and played an active role in national politics. He was regarded as a close associate of Surya Bahadur Thapa and participated in several coalition governments during the 1990s and early 2000s.
