= Dambar Tamang =

Nepali politician

The Honourable Dambar Tamang
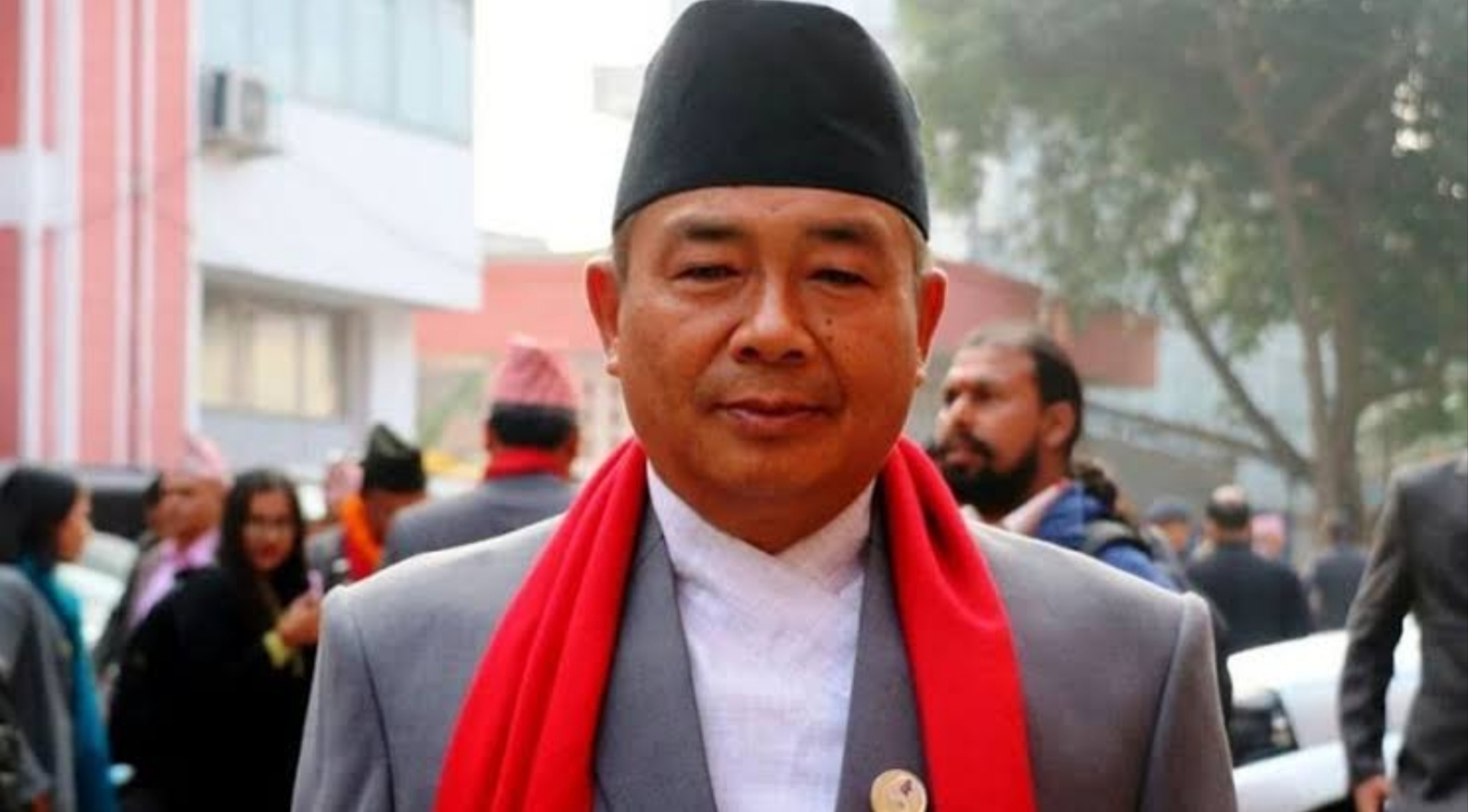

Rastriya Prajatantra Party

Member of Provincial Assembly (Bagmati) (2nd Provincial Assembly)
- Incumbent
- Assumed office 29 December 2022
- Preceded by: Jagat Bahadur Simkhada
- Constituency: Dhading 2(B)

Bagmati Province Minister of Tourism, Industry and Cooperatives
- In office 25 January 2023 – 25 February 2023
- President: Ram Chandra Poudel
- Prime Minister: Pushpa Kamal Dahal

Personal details
- Born: Rubi Valley Rural Municipality, Dhading
- Spouse: Bejong Tamang
- Relations: Budhhiman Tamang (Brother); Yoring Tamang (Brother); Khedi Maya Tamang (sister); Ruppe Maya Tamang (sister)
- Parent(s): Darjam Tamang (father); Urpa Maya Tamang (mother)
- Occupation: Politician

Dambar Tamang is a Nepalese politician and a member of the Rastriya Prajatantra Party (RPP). He belongs to Mamba Clan of Tamang Community. He has served as a member of the Bagmati Provincial Assembly, representing Dhading 2(B) since his election in the 2022 provincial election.

== Political Career ==
Dambar Tamang is affiliated with the Rastriya Prajatantra Party (RPP). He was elected to the Bagmati Provincial Assembly from Dhading 2(B) in the 2022 provincial election. As a provincial legislator, he has represented the interests of his constituency in the Provincial Assembly and has participated in legislative deliberations and policy discussions concerning the governance and development of Bagmati Province.

On 25 January 2023, Tamang was appointed Minister for Tourism, Industry and Cooperatives in the Bagmati Provincial Government led by Chief Minister Shalikram Jamkattel. In this role, he oversaw provincial policies related to tourism, industrial development, and the cooperative sector. He served until 25 February 2023, when he resigned following the RPP's decision to withdraw from the provincial coalition government.
