= Tipling =

Tipling may refer to:

- Tipling, Nepal, village in Dhading District
- David Tipling, British photographer
