= Saraswati Lama =

Nepalese politician

Honourable Saraswati Lama MP
- सरस्वती लामा
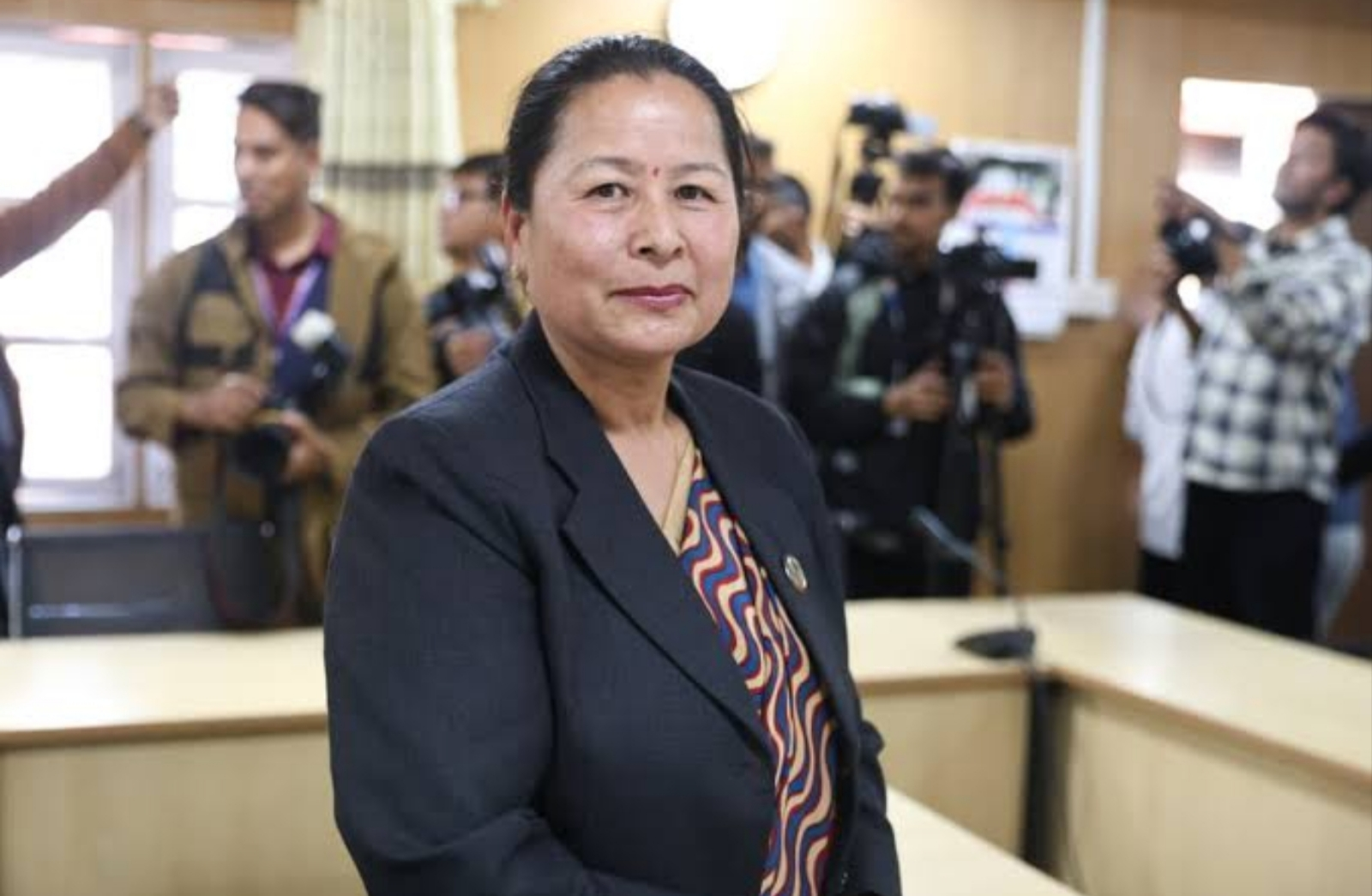

Member of Parliament, Pratinidhi Sabha
- Incumbent
- Assumed office March 2026
- Constituency: Party list

Personal details
- Born: 1968 or 1969 (age 57–58)
- Party: Rastriya Prajatantra Party
- Spouse: Budhhiman Tamang
- Parents: Pal Singh Lama (father); Maili Lama (mother)

Saraswati Lama is a Nepalese politician who serves as a member of parliament (MP) from Rastriya Prajatantra Party.

== Political career ==
Lama was elected to the Pratinidhi Sabha from Rastriya Prajatantra Party. She was elected from the party list under the Janajati female cluster.

== Personal life ==
She is married to Rastriya Prajatantra Party leader and former MP Budhhiman Tamang.
