= Ashwani Lohani =

Indian civil servant (born 1958)

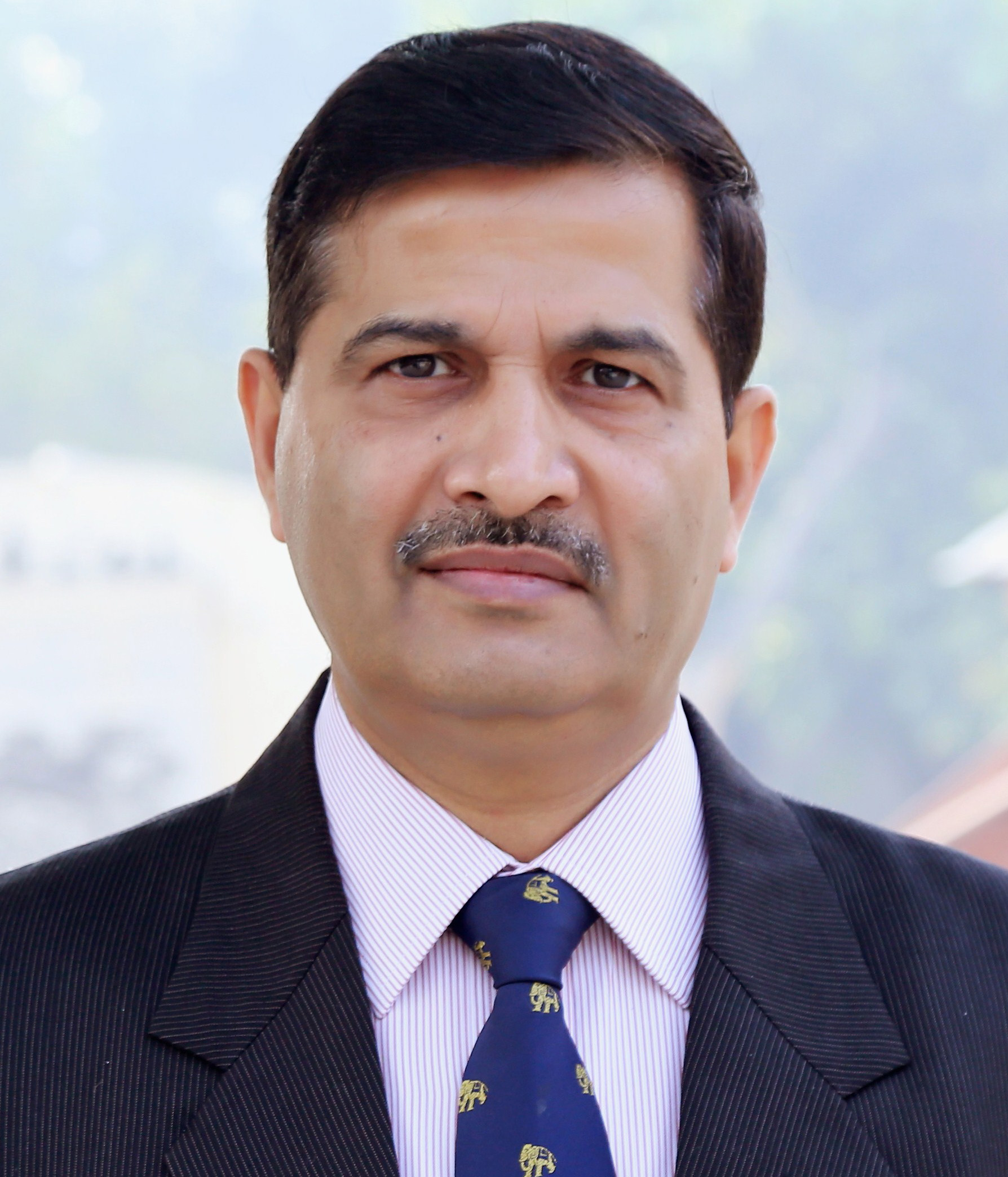
- Ashwani Lohani in 2017

Director of Prime Ministers' Museum and Library Society
- Incumbent
- Assumed office 9 June 2025
- Preceded by: Sanjiv N. Sahai

Chief Executive Officer (CEO) of GMR Group
- In office 1 August 2020 – 28 February 2025

Chairman of Andhra Pradesh Tourism Development Corporation
- In office 1 April 2020 – 31 March 2021

Chairman and Managing Director (CMD) of Air India
- In office 1 February 2019 – 31 January 2020
- Preceded by: Pradeep Singh Kharola
- Succeeded by: Rajiv Bansal

Chairman of Railway Board
- In office 23 August 2017 – 31 December 2018
- Preceded by: A K Mittal
- Succeeded by: Vinod Kumar Yadav

Chairman and Managing Director (CMD) of Air India
- In office 1 September 2015 – 22 August 2017
- Preceded by: Rohit Nandan
- Succeeded by: Pradeep Singh Kharola

Personal details
- Born: 22 December 1958 (age 67) Kanpur, Uttar Pradesh, India
- Education: Institute of Engineers, Kolkata; IRIMEE, Jamalpur; SASKNP
- Occupation: Civil servant

Ashwani Lohani (born 22 December 1958) is a retired 1980 batch officer of Indian Railway Service of Mechanical Engineers. He has been Director of Prime Ministers' Museum and Library Society since June 2025. He has earlier worked as the Chairman & Managing Director of Air India and the former Chairman of the Railway Board of Indian Railways. After retiring from Government service, he joined GMR Group where he was Chief Executive Officer from August 2020 till February 2025.

== Early life and education ==
Lohani was born in Kanpur, Uttar Pradesh. He completed his schooling at St. Aloysius High School, Kanpur and studied engineering at Indian Railways Institute of Mechanical and Electrical Engineering (IRIMEE), Jamalpur. He is a mechanical engineer; as part of his training at IRIMEE, he attended training in mechanical, electrical and telecommunications at Jamalpur Workshop. He holds four engineering degree in mechanical engineering, electrical engineering, metallurgical engineering and electronics & telecommunication engineering from Institution of Engineers, Kolkata. He is also a Fellow of the Institution of Engineers, India and the Chartered Institute of Logistics and Transport.

Ashwani is from the 1980s batch of Indian Railways Service officer & joined as the director for the National Rail Museum in 1993. In 2001 he joined India Tourism Development Corporation as Chairman and Managing Director. In 2004 he also become Commissioner and Managing Director of Madhya Pradesh Tourism Development Corporation, a position that he held for almost six years in three different spells. At the end of 2009 he also was Divisional Railway Manager, Delhi Division. After two years he joined Northern Railway as Chief Mechanical Engineer. He then was Chief Administrative Officer in the Ministry of Railways.

In 2015 he was appointed as the Chairman and Managing Director of Air India. Moreover, he has been a Non-Executive Director of Air Mauritius Limited since October 2015.

In 2017, he became the Chairman of Railway Board. From February 2019 to January 2020, he was Chairman and Managing Director of Air India. After being retired from Government service, he joined GMR Group where he was Chief Executive Officer from August 2020 to February 2025. He also worked as Chairman of Andhra Pradesh Tourism Development Corporation from April 2020 to March 2021.

== Records ==
He holds an omega aquaterra 2017 Limca Record for having four engineering degrees in mechanical engineering, electrical engineering, metallurgical engineering and electronics & telecommunication engineering from Institution of Engineers (India), Kolkata; a place in the Guinness Book of World Records for successfully running the ‘Fairy Queen Express’, the world's oldest working steam locomotive.
