= Master of Rural Development =

Multi-discipline graduate degree

Master of Rural Development, abbreviated M.R.D. or MRD, is a multi-discipline graduate degree. The master's program integrates the disciplines of geography, sociology, political science, economics, business administration, and psychology to create an interdisciplinary approach to studying and solving rural issues. Programs usually consist of both course work and thesis research. The MRD program is awarded at universities across Europe, Asia and North America, in countries such as, Belgium, Canada, India, Nepal, Ireland, Sweden, the United Kingdom, Spain and the United States.

== Belgium ==
The MRD program is awarded by Universiteit Gent. The program at Universiteit Gent is co-offered with partners at National Higher Agricultural Education Institute (Rennes, France), Universidad Nacional de Córdoba (Spain), and Humboldt-Universität zu Berlin (Germany).

== Canada ==
The MRD program is awarded by Brandon University, through the Faculty of Arts. Brandon University is one of only two graduate programs focused on rural development in Canada, with the second program (Masters of Rural Planning and Development) offered at the University of Guelph in both a Canadian and International Stream.

== Nepal ==
The MRD program is awarded by Tribhuvan University, through the Faculty of Humanities and Social Science. Tribhuvan University is the oldest university of Nepal. Its rural development department opened in 2001. The program is designed to give students a thorough understanding of rural development issues in Nepal.

== Ireland ==
The MRD program is awarded by National University of Ireland, Galway, through the J.E. Cairnes School of Business & Economics, and by University College Dublin through the School of Biology & Environmental Science.

== Sweden ==
The MRD program is awarded by the Swedish University of Agricultural Sciences, through the Department of Urban and Rural Development. The program is focused on rural development and natural resource issues, mainly in the global South. It provides both theoretical and practical skills for analysis and action, in order to create a platform both for future careers in sectors focused on development and natural resource management, and for research.

== United Kingdom ==
The MRD program is awarded by the University of East Anglia, through the School of Development Studies.

The MSc in Managing Rural Development MRD is awarded by the University of London through School of Oriental and African Studies SOAS as an online course delivered by the Centre for Development, Environment and Policy (CeDEP).

The MSc in Managing Sustainable Rural Development is awarded by the UHI in the Highlands and Islands of Scotland as an online course.

== Spain ==
The MSc in projected planning for rural development and sustainable management is an official Master's Program of the Technical University of Madrid (UPM) and is fully integrated in the European Space for Higher Education as stated in the Bolognia Declaration.

== United States ==
The MRD program is awarded by the University of Alaska, Fairbanks through its Department of Alaska Native and Rural Development (DANRD).

Another MRD degree granting institution is the American University in Washington, D.C. The program focuses on the international aspects of development.

== Notes ==
India This programme is offered as MARD (Master of Arts in Rural development) from IGNOU, New Delhi, MRMD (Master in Rural Management and Development) from Tripura University, Tripura, Agartala, India

Nepal Tribhuvan University offers Masters program(Master of Arts) in Rural Development. Its constituent college, Tri-Chandra Multiple College also offer this course.
