= Dhading 2 =

Parliamentary constituency in Nepal

- Parliamentary constituency
- Dhading 2 in Bagmati Province
- Province: Bagmati Province
- District: Dhading District

Current constituency
- Created: 1991
- Party: Rastriya Swatantra Party
- Member: Bodh Narayan Shrestha

Dhading 2 is one of two parliamentary constituencies of Dhading District in Nepal. This constituency came into existence on the Constituency Delimitation Commission (CDC) report submitted on 31 August 2017.

== Incorporated areas ==
Dhading 2 parliamentary constituency incorporates Rubi Valley Rural Municipality, Khaniyabash Rural Municipality, Gangajamuna Rural Municipality, Tripura Sundari Rural Municipality, Netrawati Rural Municipality, Nilkantha Municipality and Jwalamukhi Municipality.

== Assembly segments ==
It encompasses the following Bagmati Provincial Assembly segment

- Dhading 2(A)
- Dhading 2(B)

== Members of Parliament ==
=== Parliament/Constituent Assembly ===
Election	Member	Party
1991	Ganga Lal Tuladhar	CPN (Unified Marxist–Leninist)
1999	Ram Nath Adhikari	Nepali Congress
2008	Kalpana Dhamala	CPN (Maoist)
January 2009	Kalpana Dhamala	UCPN (Maoist)
2013	Guru Prasad Burlakoti	CPN (Unified Marxist–Leninist)
2017	Khem Prasad Lohani	CPN (Unified Marxist–Leninist)
May 2018	Khem Prasad Lohani	Nepal Communist Party
March 2021	Khem Prasad Lohani	CPN (Unified Marxist–Leninist)
2022	Ram Nath Adhikari	Nepali Congress
2026	Bodh Narayan Shrestha	Rastriya Swatantra Party

=== Provincial Assembly ===
==== 2(A) ====
Election	Member	Party
2017	Ram Kumar Adhikari	CPN (Unified Marxist–Leninist)
May 2018	Ram Kumar Adhikari	Nepal Communist Party

==== 2(B) ====
Election	Member	Party
2017	Jagat Bahadur Simkhada	CPN (Maoist Centre)
May 2018	Jagat Bahadur Simkhada	Nepal Communist Party

== Election results ==
=== Election in the 2020s ===
==== 2022 general election ====
Candidate	Party	Votes	%
Ramnath Adhikari	Nepali Congress	34,736	52.34
Khem Prasad Lohani	CPN (UML)	24,190	36.45
Basumaya Tamang	Rastriya Swatantra Party	5,569	8.39
Dhanmaya Tamang	Mongol National Organisation	1,111	1.67
Others		763	1.15
Total		66,369	100.00
Majority		10,546	
Nepali Congress gain			

=== Election in the 2010s ===
==== 2017 legislative elections ====
Party	Candidate	Votes
CPN (Unified Marxist–Leninist)	Khem Prasad Lohani	36,256
Nepali Congress	Dil Man Pakhrin	35,616
Others		1,371
Invalid votes		3,602
Result	CPN (UML) gain	
Source: Election Commission

==== 2017 Nepalese provincial elections ====
===== Dhading 2(A) =====
Party	Candidate	Votes
CPN (Unified Marxist–Leninist)	Ram Kumar Adhikari	20,368
Nepali Congress	Ramesh Prasad Dhamala	19,018
Others		537
Invalid votes		1,285
Result	CPN UML) gain	
Source: Election Commission

===== Dhading 2(B) =====
Party	Candidate	Votes
CPN (Maoist Centre)	Jagat Bahadur Simkhada	17,605
Rastriya Prajatantra Party	Dambar Tamang	15,774
Others		1,038
Invalid votes		1,159
Result	Maoist Centre gain	
Source: Election Commission

==== 2013 Constituent Assembly election ====
Party	Candidate	Votes
CPN (Unified Marxist–Leninist)	Guru Prasad Burlakoti	20,236
Nepali Congress	Ram Nath Adhikari	18,136
UCPN (Maoist)	Kalpana Dhamala	9,179
Others		1,928
Result	CPN (UML) gain	
Source: NepalNews

=== Election in the 2000s ===
==== 2008 Constituent Assembly election ====
Party	Candidate	Votes
CPN (Maoist)	Kalpana Dhamala	20,730
CPN (Unified Marxist–Leninist)	Ganga Lal Tuladhar	19,645
Nepali Congress	Ram Nath Adhikari	18,407
CPN (Marxist–Leninist)	Hari Prasad Acharya	1,633
Others		1,891
Invalid votes		2,974
Result	Maoist gain	
Source: Election Commission

=== Election in the 1990s ===
==== 1999 legislative elections ====
Party	Candidate	Votes
Nepali Congress	Ram Nath Adhikari	26,053
CPN (Unified Marxist–Leninist)	Ganga Lal Tuladhar	25,489
Rastriya Prajatantra Party	Jyan Bahadur Thakuri	1,385
CPN (Marxist–Leninist)	Bharat Raj Adhikari	1,084
Others		215
Invalid votes		1,541
Result	Congress gain	
Source: Election Commission

==== 1994 legislative elections ====
Party	Candidate	Votes
CPN (Unified Marxist–Leninist)	Ganga Lal Tuladhar	19,380
Nepali Congress	Hari Adhikari	15,684
Rastriya Prajatantra Party	Gyanu Prasad Rimal	5,870
Others		824
Result	CPN (UML) hold	
Source: Election Commission

==== 1991 legislative elections ====
Party	Candidate	Votes
CPN (Unified Marxist–Leninist)	Ganga Lal Tuladhar	18,911
Nepali Congress	Chij Kumar Shrestha	15,654
Result	CPN (UML) gain	

== See also ==
- List of parliamentary constituencies of Nepal
