= Special Class Railway Apprentice =

Defunct undergraduate training program by the Union Public Service Commission in India

Special Class Railway Apprentice (SCRA) was a programme by which candidates are selected by the Union Public Service Commission (UPSC) India, to train in the undergraduate program in mechanical engineering at the Indian Railways Institute of Mechanical and Electrical Engineering, Jamalpur. This programme started in 1927 and is one of the oldest in India.

In 2015, Railways decided to close down this examination after UPSC communicated that it was not inclined to continue conducting the examination. However, the Ministry of Finance in 2021, in its report on the rationalisation of Indian Railways has recommended to start conducting the exam again stating that Indian Railways requires specialised training and skills beyond what is part of a regular graduation program.

== Under Graduate Course ==
The Special Class Railway Apprentice (SCRA) program is one of the country's first engineering examination, and admissions have been hotly contested, with as many as 2,500,000 candidates taking the entrance examination, now conducted by Union Public Service Commission (UPSC), for about 20 to 30 seats. The examination comprises written tests in mathematics, physics, chemistry, English language, general knowledge, and a psychological test (mental ability). The selected candidates are called for an interview, which is followed by a medical examination.

The selected candidates undergo a four-year training programme in mechanical engineering, for which the Institute has a Memorandum of Understanding with Birla Institute of Technology (BIT), Mesra, Ranchi. The semester system of BIT, Mesra is followed, with workshop training sessions during the holidays at BIT, Mesra.

The apprentices get a stipend and dearness allowance, apart from other benefits such as medical care, privilege passes, PTO, etc. After successful completion of four years' training, they are absorbed into the highest-level leadership program in the Railway organization (also called Group A Officers). This cadre of officers are attached to the Indian Railway Services of Mechanical Engineers Officers (IRSME).

== History ==
The Special Class Railway Apprentice (SCRA) scheme was started in 1927 by the British, to meet the demand for engineers on the EIR (East Indian Railway) and GIP (Great Indian Peninsula) Railways. Apprentices would train at their railway's largest workshop (i.e. Jamalpur Locomotive Workshop) and for one year in United Kingdom. The selected candidates were required to appear in the mechanical engineering degree examination held by Engineering Council (London).

After independence, the scheme continued and has provided Indian Railways with its top-ranking officers.

== Academics ==
The SCRAs have distinguished themselves in academics, with 39 trainees obtaining honorable mentions from the A.M.I.Mech. E(London) from 1933–1939 and from 1954–1966 (records for the intervening period of World War II not being available). The BE (Mech.) degree is now provided in collaboration with Birla Institute of Technology, Mesra. 56 SCRAs have also won gold medals in the examinations conducted by the Institution of Engineers (India) (IEI) and 3 have been awarded University Gold Medals at Birla Institute of Technology, Mesra.

== Alumni ==
The alumni of the Institute at Jamalpur have been an integral part of the Railways' evolution by providing high quality technical managers. Five SCRAs have risen to the ranks of Chairman, Railway Board while 16 have been Members of the Railway Board. A large number of SCRAs have been General Managers and Principal Heads of Departments in the Indian Railways and its sister organizations like RITES, COFMOW, CRIS, etc.

The SCRA-graduates have also been successful outside the railways, serving at the World Bank, universities, and as corporate executives. Over 60 alumni have been principal heads, chief executives or chief medical directors of renowned organizations in India. It is the most important course of Indian Railways.

- K.L. Bery (1938), Padmashri
- A.C. Chatterjee (1941), Padmashri
- P.C. Luther (1944), Padmashri
- Z.I. Puri (1944), MM, Pakistan Railway Board
- M.M. Suri (1945), Padmashri - in action in 1971
- M.C. Khanna (1947), Vishisht Seva Medal
- P.S. Chaudhuri (1947), Vishisht Seva Medal
- H.N. Gupta (1956), 1997 American Biographical Institute Man of the Year
- N.C. Sinha (1957), Vishisht Seva Medal - in action in 1971
- Rajendra K. Pachauri (1958), Padma Vibhushan, Nobel Peace Prize (on behalf of IPCC)

== See also ==
- List of Public service commissions in India
