= Indian Railways Institute of Mechanical and Electrical Engineering =

Training institutes of Indian Railways in Jamalpur, Bihar

- Official Emblem of Indian Railways

Institute overview
- Founded: 1888; 138 years ago
- Country: India
- Training Institute: Indian Railways Institute of Mechanical and Electrical Engineering (IRIMEE), Jamalpur, Bihar
- Head: P. Ravi Kumar, IRSME (1985 batch), Director
- Minister responsible: Ashwini Vaishnaw, Minister of Railways, Communication and IT
- Legal personality: Governmental; Engineering; Centralised Training Institutes of the Indian Railways
- Notable Alumni: Ashwani Lohani (former CRB), Rajendra K. Pachauri (on behalf of IPCC) (Nobel Peace Prize)
- Website: IRIMEE Jamalpur; IRIMEE Jamalpur

The Indian Railways Institute of Mechanical and Electrical Engineering (IRIMEE) was founded in 1888 as a technical school and commenced training Mechanical Officers for Indian Railways in 1927. It is the oldest of the five Centralised Training Institutes (CTIs) for training officers for Indian Railways. IRIMEE is located at Jamalpur in the Munger district of Bihar, on the Patna-Bhagalpur rail route. IRIMEE provides theoretical and practical training for a four-year undergraduate degree in mechanical engineering as well as professional courses to officers and supervisors of Indian Railways. There are also courses for non-railway organizations and foreign railways.

== Location ==
Traditionally a center for firearms manufacturing, Jamalpur was selected by the East Indian Railway for one of its earliest workshops and was established on 8 February 1862. Located in the foothills of the Rajmahal range (a part of Chhota Nagpur Plateau), the site was high enough to survive any threat of floods from the Ganges, and the hills secured it against any organized attack from an enemy. The site had a tomb of Baba Jamal Saheb after whom the place was named.

== History ==
Indian Railways Institute of Mechanical and Electrical Engineering (IRIMEE) is the oldest CTI of Indian Railways. It was originally set up in 1888 as a technical school attached to the Railway Locomotive Workshop Jamalpur of the East Indian Railway. In 1905, this technical school started an Apprentice Mechanics Scheme for Anglo-Indians. At the end of a five-year apprenticeship, the Apprentice Mechanics were appointed as Assistant Foremen or Assistant Superintendents on the East India Railway. In 1911, the scheme was extended to include other Indians.

The program gained national prominence in February 1927 when it started training Special Class Railway Apprentice Mechanical and Electrical Engineers. From 1 April 1974, the school was made a Centralised Training Institute (CTI) and renamed the Indian Railways Institute of Mechanical & Electrical Engineering. It was put under the direct control of the Railway Board.

In 1988, the training of Indian Railway Service of Mechanical Engineers (IRSME) Probationers was centralised and put under the control of the Director of the IRIMEE, but with headquarters in Kharagpur, where there was an Officer on Special Duty (OSD) who coordinated the training with the Director. In 1997, the headquarters of the IRSME probationers was shifted to Jamalpur.

IRIMEE is headed by a Director who is supported by a faculty of professors. The senior faculty consists of officers from Indian Railways on temporary assignment. These officers administer IRIMEE without specialized administrators.

== Facilities ==
Built in the first decade of the 20th century, the original two-story building of IRIMEE was destroyed in a major earthquake in 1921, but it was redesigned and reconstructed in 1924. The building encloses several beautiful, landscaped gardens laid out in quadrangles. There are eight classrooms equipped with computers connected to the internet, laboratories and model rooms for theoretical and practical training, and two computer labs with high-speed internet connectivity. A new CAD/CAM laboratory is being established. There is also a 500-seat auditorium for seminars and workshops, as well as a conference hall.

There are model rooms for Carriage & Wagon, Train Lighting and Air conditioning in coaches, Freight, Air-brake systems, 140 Tonne Crane, ALCO Locomotives and High horsepower Locomotives. It has an excellent Mechatronics Lab, CNC trainer Machines and a Bio-diesel lab.

There are three hostels for supervisory, long-term, and short-term trainees with television and computers connected to the internet. Recreational facilities includes multi-gyms, table tennis, field hockey, squash, basketball, and swimming.

== Courses and Activities ==
IRIMEE offers a highly-competitive four-year undergraduate course leading to a degree in Mechanical Engineering. IRIMEE also conducts short-term courses for IRSME officers and other organizations. These courses includes:

- Four years of theoretical and practical training of Special Class Railway Apprentices (SCRA) leading to a Bachelor's degree in Mechanical Engineering. The coursework is tailored to meet Indian Railways' needs, with strong emphasis on Industrial Engineering and Production Engineering. This is achieved through a Thick Sandwich course composed of
  - Alternating classroom (School Session) and practical (Shop Session) training
  - Term papers and projects based upon assignments in the Workshop
  - Credit courses at other universities and colleges
  - Final year project involving design and manufacture
- Professional courses for serving officers and supervisors of the Mechanical Engineering Department
- 78 weeks of training for IRSME Probationers, as well as introductory courses for Probationers of other departments
- Special courses for non-Indian Railways organizations and foreign railways

== See also ==
- Indian Railways organisational structure
- Indian Railway Service of Mechanical Engineers (IRSME)
- Jamalpur Gymkhana
