= Rajendra K. Pachauri =

Indian academic (1940–2020)

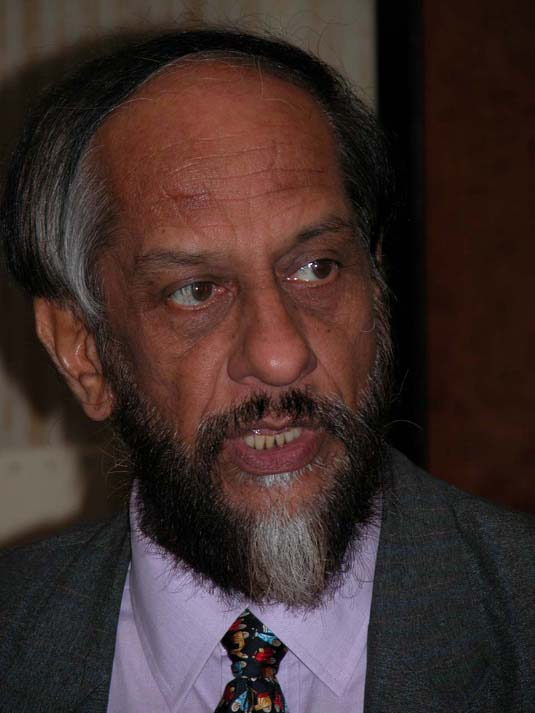
- Pachauri in 2002

3rd chair of the Intergovernmental Panel on Climate Change
- In office 20 April 2002 – 24 February 2015
- Preceded by: Robert Watson
- Succeeded by: Hoesung Lee

Personal details
- Born: Rajendra Kumar Pachauri; 20 August 1940 Nainital, United Provinces, British India (now in Uttarakhand, India)
- Died: 13 February 2020 (aged 79) New Delhi, India
- Spouse: Saroj Pachauri
- Children: 3
- Education: La Martiniere College, Lucknow; North Carolina State University (MS 1972, PhD 1974)
- Occupation: Former chairman, Intergovernmental Panel on Climate Change, Former chairman and director general, The Energy and Resources Institute (TERI)
- Awards: Padma Vibhushan, Nobel Peace Prize (on behalf of IPCC)
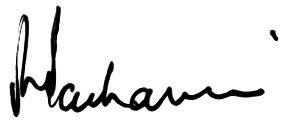
- Signature

Rajendra Kumar Pachauri (20 August 1940 – 13 February 2020) was the chairman of the Intergovernmental Panel on Climate Change (IPCC) from 2002 to 2015, during the fourth and fifth assessment cycles. Under his leadership the IPCC was awarded the Nobel Peace Prize in 2007 and delivered the Fifth Assessment Report, the scientific foundation of the Paris Agreement. He held the post from 2002 until his resignation in February 2015 after facing multiple allegations of sexual harassment. In March 2022, he was exonerated of the sexual harassment allegations (The Court of Additional Sessions Judge in Saket Court). He was succeeded by Hoesung Lee. Pachauri assumed his responsibilities as the chief executive of The Energy and Resources Institute in 1981 and led the institute for more than three decades and demitted office as executive vice chairman of TERI in 2016. Pachauri, universally known as Patchy, was an internationally recognized voice on environmental and policy issues, and his leadership of the IPCC contributed to the issue of human-caused climate change becoming recognized as a matter of vital global concern.

== Background ==
Pachauri was born in Nainital, India. He was educated at La Martiniere College in Lucknow and at the Indian Railways Institute of Mechanical and Electrical Engineering in Jamalpur, Bihar. He belonged to the Special Class Railway Apprentices, 1958 Batch. He began his career with the Indian Railways at the Diesel Locomotive Works in Varanasi. He was admitted to North Carolina State University in Raleigh, United States, where he obtained an MS in Industrial Engineering in 1972, and a PhD with co-majors in Industrial Engineering and Economics in 1974. His doctoral thesis was titled A dynamic model for forecasting of electrical energy demand in a specific region located in North and South Carolina. He was a strict vegetarian, largely because of "the environmental and climate change implications."

== Career ==
He served as assistant professor (August 1974 – May 1975) and visiting faculty member (summer 1976 and 1977) in the Department of Economics and Business at NC State. He°was a visiting professor of resource economics at the College of Mineral and Energy Resources, West Virginia University. On his return to India, he joined the Administrative Staff College of India, Hyderabad, as Member Senior Faculty (June 1975 – June 1979) and went on to become director, Consulting and Applied Research Division (July 1979 – March 1981). He joined The Energy and Resources Institute (TERI) as director in 1982. He was also a senior visiting fellow at the Resource Systems Institute (1982), and visiting research fellow at the World Bank, Washington DC (1990). On 20 April 2002, Pachauri was elected chairman of the Intergovernmental Panel on Climate Change, a United Nations panel established by the World Meteorological Organization (WMO) and United Nations Environment Programme (UNEP) to assess information relevant for understanding climate change.

Pachauri was on the board of governors, Shriram Scientific and Industrial Research Foundation (September 1987); the executive committee of the India International Centre, New Delhi (1985 onwards); the governing council of the India Habitat Centre, New Delhi (October 1987 onwards); and the Court of Governors, Administrative Staff College of India (1979–81) and advises such companies as Pegasus Capital Advisors, the Chicago Climate Exchange, Toyota, Deutsche Bank and NTPC. He has served as member of many societies and commissions. He has been the member of board of the International Solar Energy Society (1991–1997), World Resources Institute Council (1992), while Chairman of the World Energy Council (1993–1995), president and then chairman of the International Association for Energy Economics (1988–1990), and the president of the Asian Energy Institute (Since 1992). He was a part-time advisor to the United Nations Development Programme (1994—1999) in the fields of Energy and Sustainable Management of Natural Resources. In July 2001, R K Pachauri was appointed member, Economic Advisory Council to the prime minister of India.

=== Work with the IPCC ===
On 20 April 2002, Pachauri was elected Chairman of the United Nations established Intergovernmental Panel on Climate Change.

Pachauri was vocal on the issue of climate change and said, "What is happening, and what is likely to happen, convinces me that the world must be really ambitious and very determined at moving toward a 350 target." 350 refers to the level in parts per million of carbon dioxide in the atmosphere that some climate scientists such as NASA's James Hansen agree to be a safe upper limit to avoid a climate tipping point. His career with IPCC came to an abrupt end after the sexual harassment charges against him surfaced in Indian courts.

=== 2007 Nobel Peace Prize for IPCC ===
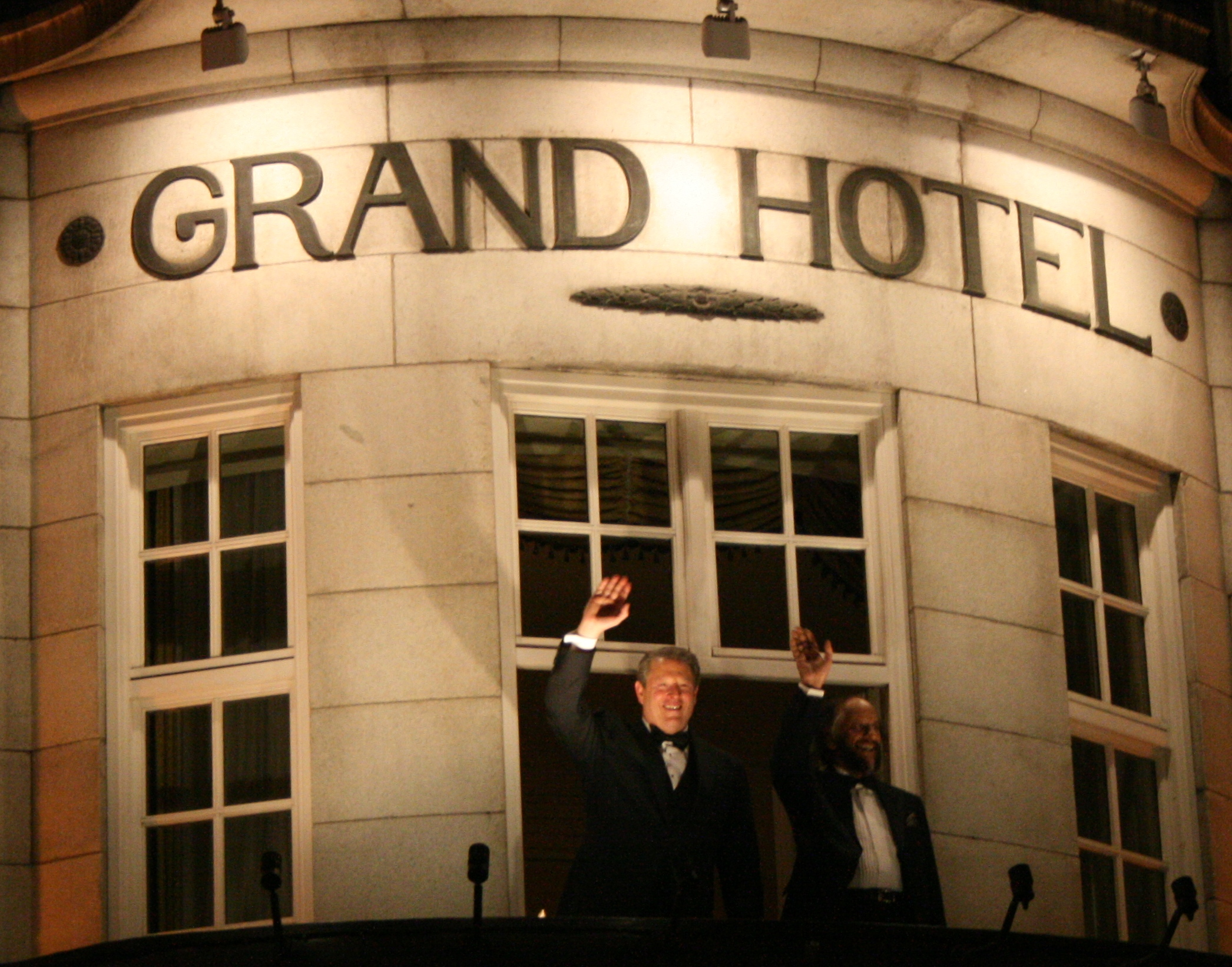
Pachauri and Al Gore on the balcony of the Grand Hotel, Oslo

The IPCC shared the 2007 Nobel Peace Prize with former US vice-president Al Gore, who had earlier criticised Pachauri when he was first elected in 2002.

On 11 December 2007, Pachauri (representing the recipient IPCC) and co-recipient Al Gore delivered their acceptance speeches at an awards ceremony in Oslo, Norway, on a day when delegates to a United Nations climate conference were meeting in Bali, Indonesia. Pachauri referenced his belief that the Hindu philosophy of "'Vasudhaiva Kutumbakam', which means 'the whole universe is one family,'" must dominate global efforts to protect the global commons." Returning to this theme throughout his speech, he quoted president of the Maldives in 1987 (Maumoon Abdul Gayoom):

"...a mean sea level rise of two meters would suffice to virtually submerge the entire country of 1,190 small islands, most of which barely rise two meters above sea level. That would be the death of a nation."

Pachauri repeatedly emphasised his concerns regarding the implications of climate change for the world's poorest nations, referring to studies that:

"...have raised the threat of dramatic population migration, conflict, and war over water and other resources, as well as a realignment of power among nations. Some also highlight the possibility of rising tensions between rich and poor nations, health problems caused particularly by water shortages and crop failures...

=== Commitment to other organisations ===
Rajendra K. Pachauri was a member of the Fondation Chirac's honour committee, since its launch in 2008 by former French president Jacques Chirac to promote world peace. Dr. Pachauri was also president of the Global Union Of Scientists For Peace in India.

== Lighting a Billion Lives initiative ==
Pachauri conceptualised and launched the global 'Lighting a Billion Lives' (LaBL) initiative in 2008, to facilitate clean energy access to the energy poor. The initiative has taken solar energy to remote places such as Sundarbans, West Bengal, Thar Desert, Rajasthan, and in the state of Bihar. Being an early advocate for integration of access to clean cooking and lighting solution, the initiative has successfully deployed several thousands of Integrated Domestic Energy Systems (IDES) in rural and remote areas. It has set several benchmarks and has emphasized on access to a menu of clean energy options for the poor at last mile locations. LaBL has also been a platform for several technology manufacturers to start-up with business in the clean energy space. The initiative has its footfalls in 13 plus countries and 23 plus states of India.

== Controversies ==
=== Allegations of conflict of interest and financial anomalies ===
Christopher Booker and Richard North wrote an article for the Daily Telegraph in January 2010 alleging potential conflicts of interest related to Pachauri's membership of the board of ONGC and to research grants for TERI, a non-profit institution of which Pachauri was director general. They further alleged that financial anomalies existed at TERI Europe. Pachauri denied all allegations.

In response to the allegations, the audit firm KPMG carried out a review at TERI's request. The review stated: "No evidence was found that indicated personal financial benefits accruing to Dr Pachauri from his various advisory roles that would have led to a conflict of interest". The report explains its objectives and methodology and states that "Work done by us was as considered necessary at that point in time" and that it is based on the information provided by TERI, Pachauri and Pachauri's tax counsel. In a caveat the review explains that its scope was "significantly different from an audit and cannot be relied on to provide the same level of assurance as an audit". KPMG examined payments made by private sector companies and found that payments amounting to $326,399 were made to TERI itself, not to Pachauri. He had received only his annual salary from TERI, amounting to £45,000 a year, plus a maximum of about £2,174 from outside earnings. He received no payment for chairing the IPCC.

On 21 August 2010, the Daily Telegraph issued an apology, saying that it had "not intended to suggest that Dr Pachauri was corrupt or abusing his position as head of the IPCC and we accept KPMG found Dr Pachauri had not made "millions of dollars" in recent years." It stated: "We apologise to Dr Pachauri for any embarrassment caused." The Guardian reported that the Telegraph paid legal costs of over £100,000. Pachauri welcomed the Telegraph's apology, saying that he was "glad that they have finally acknowledged the truth", and attributed the false allegations to "another attempt by the climate sceptics to discredit the IPCC. They now want to go after me and hope that it would serve their purpose."

George Monbiot of The Guardian stated his view that despite Pachauri being cleared by KPMG of conflict of interest and financial wrongdoing, false claims had been repeated about him by Richard North, the Daily Mail and The Australian.

=== Sexual harassment case ===
On 18 February 2015, Delhi police filed a First Information Report (FIR) against Pachauri on allegations of sexual harassment, stalking and criminal intimidation. On 21 March, the Delhi High Court granted him anticipatory bail. While in May 2015, Pachauri was found guilty of sexual harassment by an internal complaints committee (ICC) of TERI, the findings of the ICC have been challenged before the Industrial Tribunal on the grounds of violation of the principles of natural justice. An article in an Indian magazine The Caravan detailed the exploits of RK Pachauri during his tenure at TERI.

In a statement, Pachauri said that the contents of the charge sheet are “allegations” levelled by the complainant and nothing has been “substantiated” after a year-long investigation. Pachauri has maintained: “From my perspective this was nothing but a very cordial and mutual relationship. There was a light and friendly tone to our correspondence, but at no stage did I ever hint at having a physical relationship nor did I in any way engage in sexual harassment”. Pachauri was granted regular bail from the trial court in July 2016. The court observed "The investigation of the case is complete. Charge sheet has already been filed. He was never arrested during the investigation in the instant case which goes on to show that his custody is not required for the purpose of investigation".

== Awards and recognition ==
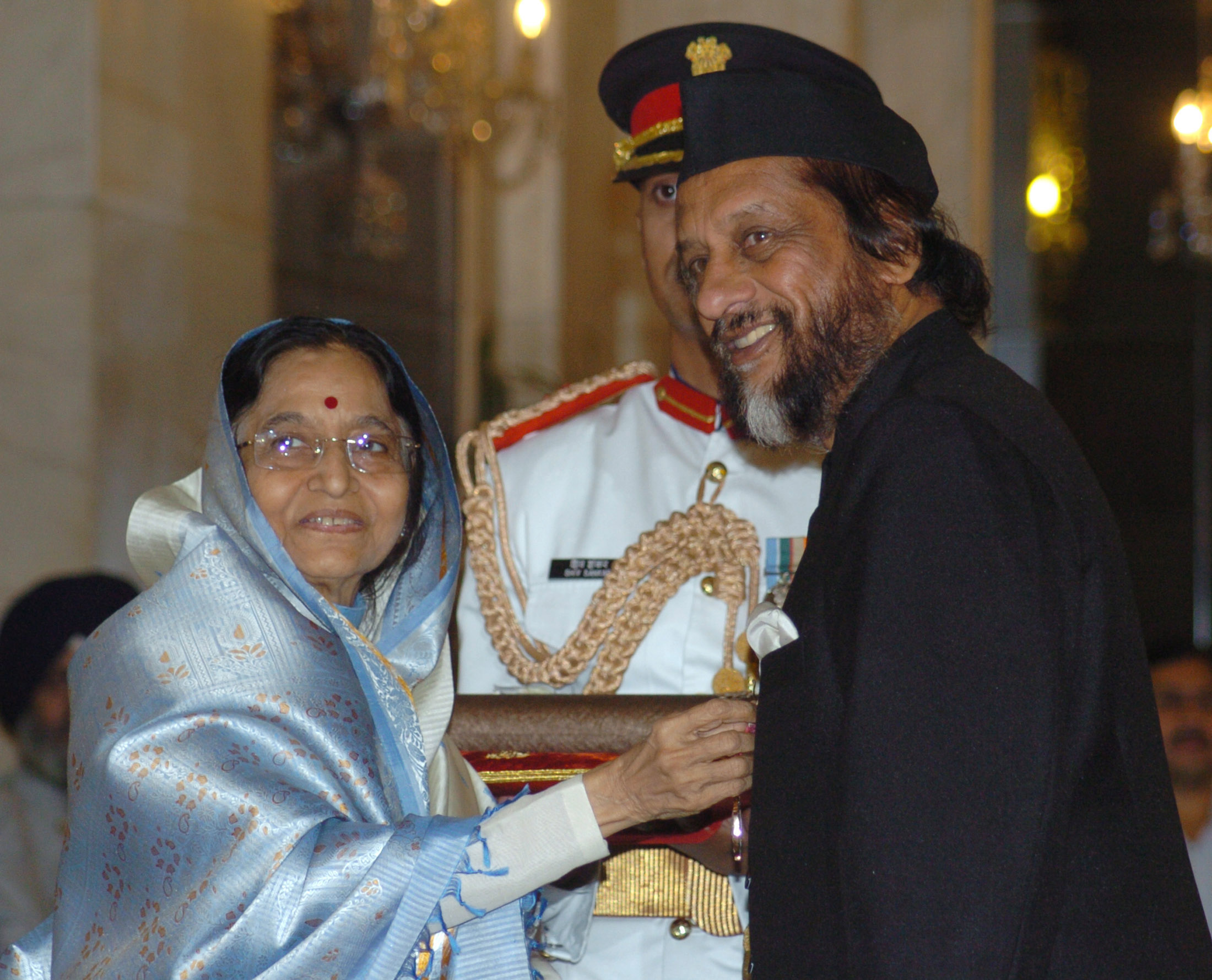
The President, Smt. Pratibha Devisingh Patil presenting the Padma Vibhushan to Dr. Rajendra Kumar Pachauri at Civil Investiture-II Ceremony, at Rashtrapati Bhavan, in New Delhi on 10 May 2008

- In January 2001, India's Government awarded him the Padma Bhushan.
- NDTV Global Indian of the Year for the year 2007.
- Nature News maker of the Year 2007. The magazine lauded Pachauri in an article as an organisation builder "Rajendra Pachauri's great strength is in building and organizing institutions in the fields he understands best – engineering and economics as they apply to issues of development".
- On 14 July 2008, Pachauri received the title UNIDO Goodwill Ambassador.
- In January 2008, he was awarded the second-highest civilian award in India, the Padma Vibhushan.
- In November 2009, Pachauri received the 'Order of the Rising Sun – Gold and Silver Star' in recognition of his contribution to the enhancement of Japan's policy towards climate change. He was bestowed with the decoration by Emperor Akihito.
- In November 2009, Pachauri was rated fifth in the list of "Top 100 Global thinkers" by Foreign Policy magazine, for "ending the debate over whether climate change matters."
- In February 2010, the president of Finland conferred the Order of the White Rose of Finland to Pachauri in recognition of his work in promoting international co-operation on climate change and sustainable development.
- The French government has awarded him the 'Officer of the Legion of Honour'.
- HEC Paris appointed Pachauri Professor Honoris Causa in October 2009.
- University of Reims Champagne-Ardenne appointed Pachauri Professor Honoris Causa in September 2012.

== Other interests ==
Other than his academic publications, Pachauri also wrote poetry and fiction. He is the author of Return to Almora, a romance novel published in 2010. The novel is in the form of the reminiscences of a retired bureaucrat, once an engineering student, about his spiritual and sexual past. He co-wrote Moods and Musings, a collection of poems, with his daughter Rashmi Pachauri-Rajan.

== See also ==
- TERI University
- The Energy and Resources Institute

Political offices
Preceded by Robert Watson	Chairman of the IPCC; 2002–2015	Succeeded by Hoesung Lee
