= Centre for Development, Environment and Policy at SOAS, University of London =

Centre for Development Environment and Policy (CeDEP) at SOAS University of London
- Affiliations: SOAS University of London; ACU; 1994 Group 2007-13 Russell Group until 2007
- Director: Prof. Thomas Tanner
- Students: 650
- Location: London, United Kingdom
- Mascot: Tardigrade
- Website: www.soas.ac.uk/cedep/

Centre for Development, Environment and Policy ("CeDEP"), is a research and teaching centre based in the Department of Development Studies at SOAS University of London. Its specialism is in distance learning postgraduate qualifications in the subject areas of climate change, sustainability and development, placing emphasis on the need for informed professionals with inter-disciplinary skills and understanding to effectively tackle environmental issues, poverty, including their ethical, political, economic, social and technical dimensions. CeDEP's research covers climate change, energy, food systems and sustainability education. The current Director of CeDEP is Professor Thomas Tanner

== Background ==
The Centre for Development, Environment and Policy (CeDEP) has a 27-year history of distance and online learning, and was originally part of the University of London's Wye College, then later becoming part of Imperial College, and since 2011 has been part of SOAS.

== Study programmes ==
As well as hosting PhD students, CeDEP offers Master's programmes on:

- MSc/PGDip/PGCert Climate Change and Development
- MSc/PGDip/PGCert Sustainable Development

== Research areas ==
The CeDEP's academic staff undertake research and support international PhD students. The areas covered by research are divided into main streams:

- Climate change and sustainability policy
- Resilience and climate change adaptation
- Low carbon energy transitions and policy
- Agricultural development, food systems and poverty reduction
- Education for sustainability

== Location ==
- CeDEP is hosted at SOAS, within the College of Development, Economics and Finance (CoDEF) at the Russell Square campus. Thornhaugh Street, Russell Square, London WC1H 0XG
- Historically, CeDEP was part of Wye College. The centre, then called DLP, offered several programmes and support to distance learners, then it became part of Imperial College London upon the merger with Wye College. The centre was hosted in Bexley House and Ian Carruthers House at the Imperial College campus in Wye, Ashford, Kent up until May 2011.

== Historical links ==
- Wye College
- Imperial College
