= Tipling, Nepal =

Tipling
- Village development committee
- Location in Nepal
- Coordinates: 28.20°N 85.16°E
- Country: Nepal
- Zone: Bagmati Zone
- District: Dhading District

Population (1991)
  - Total: 2,092
  - Religions: Christian
- Time zone: UTC+5:45 (Nepal Time)

Tipling is a village and village development committee in Dhading District in the Bagmati Zone of central Nepal.

At the time of the 1991 Nepal census it had a population of 2092 and had 436 houses in it. The population includes Tamang Catholics.

In 2024 a local Catholic youth group produced a film called "The Convergence of Indigenous Tamang Tradition and Catholic Faith in Tipling", which illustrates how people have incorporated traditional practices into their faith.
