= Khem Prasad Lohani =

Nepali politician

- खेमप्रसाद लोहनी

Member of Parliament, Pratinidhi Sabha
- In office 4 March 2018 – 18 September 2022
- Preceded by: Guru Prasad Burlakoti
- Constituency: Dhading 2

Personal details
- Born: 26 March 1962 (age 64)
- Party: CPN UML

Khem Prasad Lohani is a Nepali politician and a member of the House of Representatives of the federal parliament of Nepal. He was elected under the first-past-the-post (FPTP) system representing CPN UML of the left alliance from Dhading-2 constituency. He defeated his closest rival Dilman Pakhrin of Nepali Congress by acquiring 36,654 votes to Pakhrin's 36,015. This was the first time he was elected to parliament.
