= Jamalpur Locomotive Workshop =

Railway workshops in Bihar, India

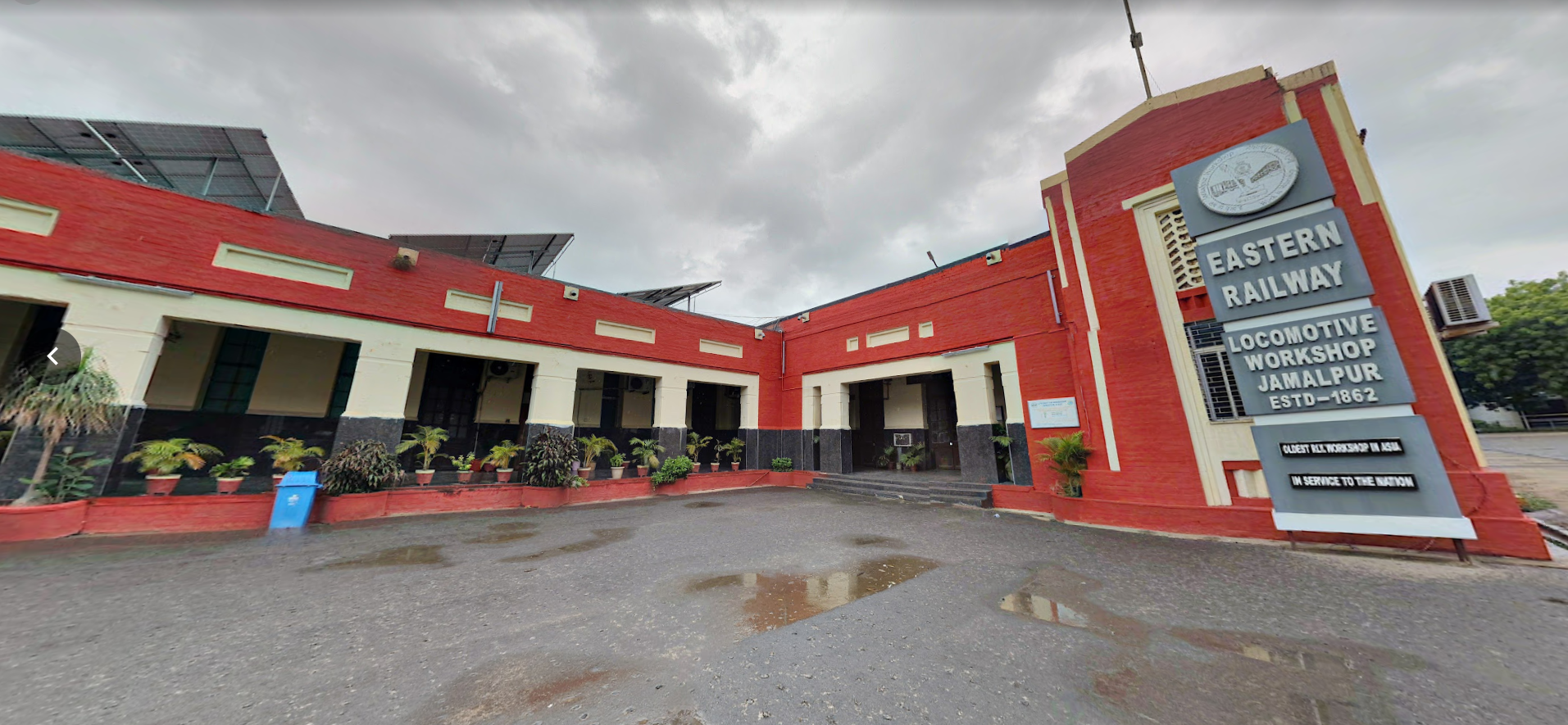
- Jamalpur Workshop Office

- Location in Munger
- Operated: 8 February 1862
- Location: Jamalpur, Bihar, India
- Coordinates: 25.310544611363515°N 86.49378845244408°E
- Industry: Railway

Jamalpur Locomotive Workshop is a railway workshop established on February 8, 1862, as the first fully-fledged railway workshop facility in India. It was started by the East Indian Railway Company (EIR) as a result of the so-called "Railway Age" in India, which began in 1854.

A locomotive, carriage, and wagon workshop had been set up in Howrah to put imported rolling stock into service for the EIR and also to carry out repairs. This workshop was unsuccessful, partly because of problems procuring supplies and sourcing enough skilled labor. Within eight years of its establishment in Howrah, the workshop was closed, and the Jamalpur Workshop was established at Jamalpur.

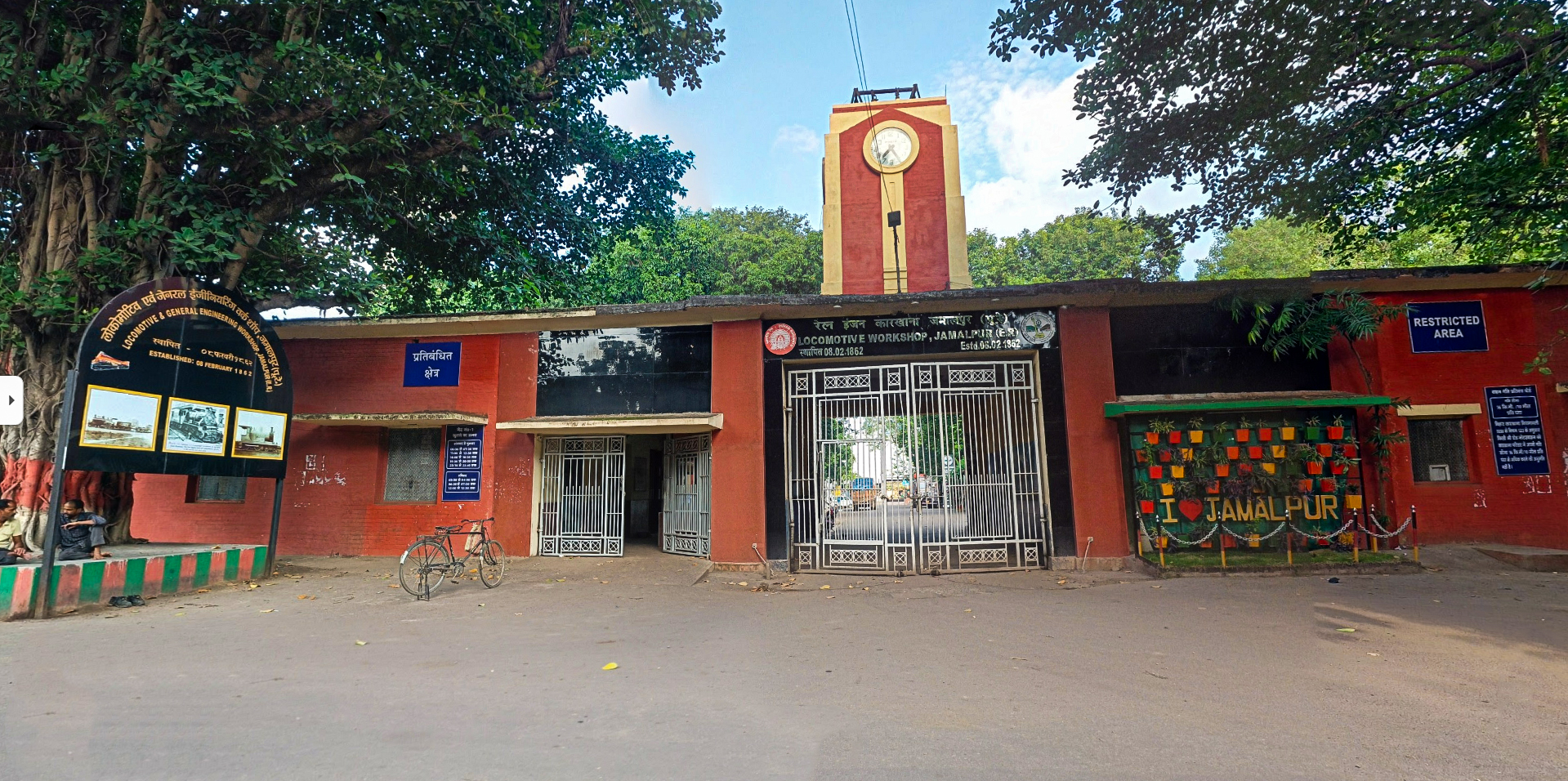
Locomotive Workshop Jamalpur Entrance Gate

== History ==
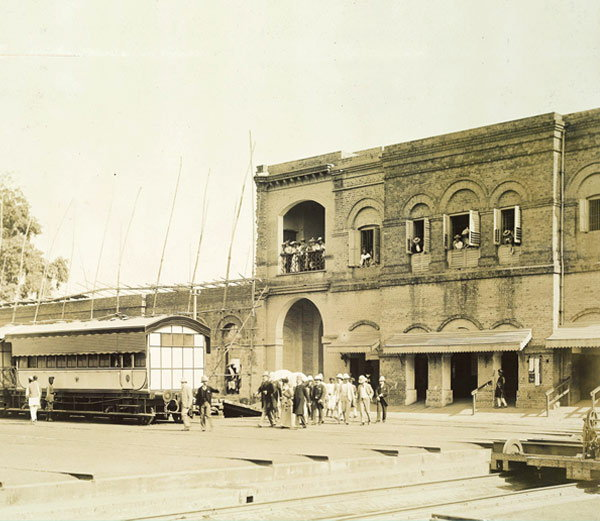
Jamalpur workshop in 1887

Jamalpur Workshop enjoys the distinction of being the largest and the oldest locomotive repair workshop with the most diversified manufacturing activities on the Indian Railways. At first, the Jamalpur shops were merely repairing locomotives and also assembling locomotives from parts salvaged from other or damaged locomotives. By the turn of the 20th century, they had progressed to producing their own locomotives. In 1899, CA 764 Lady Curzon was produced by the Jamalpur Workshop. In 1893, the first railway foundry in India was set up at Jamalpur Workshop. It also had a boiler workshop for repairing and building boilers. A 5 MVA captive power plant was also developed in the Jamalpur Workshop. In 1870, it was equipped with a rolling mill of its own, which currently no longer works. In addition to various repairs of wagons, coaches, cranes, tower cars, and locomotives, Jamalpur also undertakes the repair and production of permanent-way fixtures. It also manufactures some tower cars such as Mark II, Mark III and break-down cranes of 10, 20, and 140 tonne capacities, besides various kinds of heavy-duty lifting jacks.

Finally, it also manufactures wheel sets for coaches and wagons. Jamalpur Workshop was a significant supplier of cast-iron sleepers as well. Starting in 1961 it produced several rail cranes. It has also produced electric arc furnaces and ticket printers. The high-capacity synchronized lifting jacks known as Jamalpur jacks were also produced by this workshop.

The school attached to the Jamalpur workshops eventually became the IR Institute of Mechanical and Electrical Engineering.

== Jamalpur as a site for EIR's Locomotive Workshops ==
The place was adjacent to Munghyr (now Munger), which was at that time considered to be Birmingham of the East. There was a plentiful supply of skilled mechanics from Munghyr, because the inhabitants of Munghyr had been the mechanics by trade for centuries, manufacturing iron wares, guns, pistols, spears and other works.

When the selection was made it was probably thought that Jamalpur would be on the proposed mainline of EIR which was subsequently changed and was directed to Delhi via Ranigunj, Gaya, Mughalsarai, Allahabad and, Kanpur. Initially, Jamalpur was only an engine changing station and, light repairs were done in the running shed there. The original headquarters of the locomotive department of EIR was situated at Howrah but had a great drawback because it was too confined for extensions as and when needed. At Howrah, the original workshop was supposed to handle the building of locomotives, carriages and wagons.

== Statistics ==
Vital Statistics of Jamalpur workshop
Area	5,74,654 sq. meters
Staff	111,485
No. of Machinery and Plants	1628
Power consumed	7 MVA
Annual Turnover	₹ 10.56 billion
Water supply	7.3 million liters/day

== Achievements ==
- Jamalpur workshop is the only workshop in Indian Railways that has a 5 MVA captive power house
- The workshop has a number of FIRSTS in India to its credit, a few of which are
- The first to manufacture a steam locomotive and a locomotive boiler – 216 of which were manufactured between 1899 and 1923.
- The first to have set up a rolling mill not only on the railways, but probably in the country in 1870. It had 3 mills, steam driven Power hammer, fish plate machine, billet shears, the mill was driven by steam from boilers placed on the top of the furnaces and heated by gas from the furnaces. It produced about 400 tons of rounds, channels, angles and fishplates per month
- The first to establish a railway foundry in the year 1893
- The first to manufacture a rail crane in the country with indigenous know-how in 1961.
- The first to manufacture high capacity electrical lifting jacks and ticket printing, ticket chopping, ticket slitting and ticket counting machines.
- The first and the only railway workshop to manufacture electrical arc furnaces of ½ tonne capacity in 1961 for production of steel castings.
- The first to establish a Signal Equipment shop, more popularly known as "Points and Crossing and Interlocking shop" which was started in 1894. It produced all the interlocking frames of different sizes for the E
- The first and only to manufacture 140 tonne diesel break-down cranes.

== Preserved JMP locomotives ==
The following are some of the preserved locomotives built by Jamalpur locomotive workshop marked as JMP:

Class with number	Wheel arrangement (Whyte notation)	Build date	Operational owner(s)	Disposition
GT 1057	0-8-0	1910	EIR	Scrap India, 2/2 K.C. Roy Choudhury Road, Belur Math, Howrah – 711202
CT 836	0-6-4	1906	EIR	Scrap India, 2/2 K.C. Roy Choudhury Road, Belur Math, Howrah – 711202
CA 34016	0-6-0	1901	EIR then IR	Scrap India, 2/2 K.C. Roy Choudhury Road, Belur Math, Howrah – 711202
DT 3530	0-6-2	1913	N/A	Ramgarhia Polytechnic College, Phagwara

== IRIMEE ==
The Indian Railways Institute of Mechanical and Electrical Engineering (also known as IRIMEE) at Jamalpur is the oldest of the Centralized Training Institutions (CTIs) of the Indian Railway. IRIMEE started as a technical school attached to the Jamalpur Workshops in the 1900s, then the largest railway repair workshops in India. After the first World War, the technical school was greatly expanded for the taining of railwroadapprentices and supervisory staff involved with mechanical engineering. In the 1960s, a Diesel Traction Faculty was set up to conduct training courses and publish educational materials as IR engaged in desalinization.

In 1971 the school was renamed the IRIMEE, and brought under the direct control of the Railway Board. In 1988 IRIMEE began conducting the various required courses for IRSME probationary engineers and various Mechanical Engineering staff. From 1997, IRIMEE has also been conducting various short-duration courses for other staff on various engineering topics. Topics include rolling stock and workshop technology, management science, and information technology aimed at officers and supervisory staff.

== Current activities ==
With the gradual eclipse of steam traction on Indian Railways, steam locomotive activities, which had peaked to 600 standard units per month in 1962–63, started declining in the late 60's and finally the steam activities came to a complete end in August 1992. The shop kept pace with both, the technology change and technology up gradation on Indian Railways and diversified its activities to the overhauling and repair of diesel locomotives, overhauling and repair of various types of wagons, manufacture and overhauling of diesel hydraulic break-down cranes up to 140 tonne capacity and the manufacturing and repair of various types of tower cars.

Apart from the above activity, Jamalpur shops are also engaged in the following activities:

=== Periodical overhauling (POH) and repair of diesel locomotives ===
Periodical overhauling (POH) and repair of diesel locomotives at Jamalpur Workshop started in 1982 the workshop caters full demand of Eastern Railway. The Workshop also deals with special repairs to accident involved locomotives and locomotives owned by various public sector undertakings like NTPC, CPT, SAIL in the eastern region. So far 84 such locomotives from PSUs have been repaired and generated a cash inflow of ₹ 26 crores.

=== Rebuilding and repair of BOX wagons ===
Due to generation of a large no of unloadable BOX wagons in Eastern Railway and thus limiting the usage of these wagons it was felt necessary to introduce special type of repair to BOX wagons in between POH to make them earn revenue. These scheme yielded results and Jamalpur shops gradually increased their production from 2445 FWUs in 95–96 to 3602 FWUs in 99–2000.

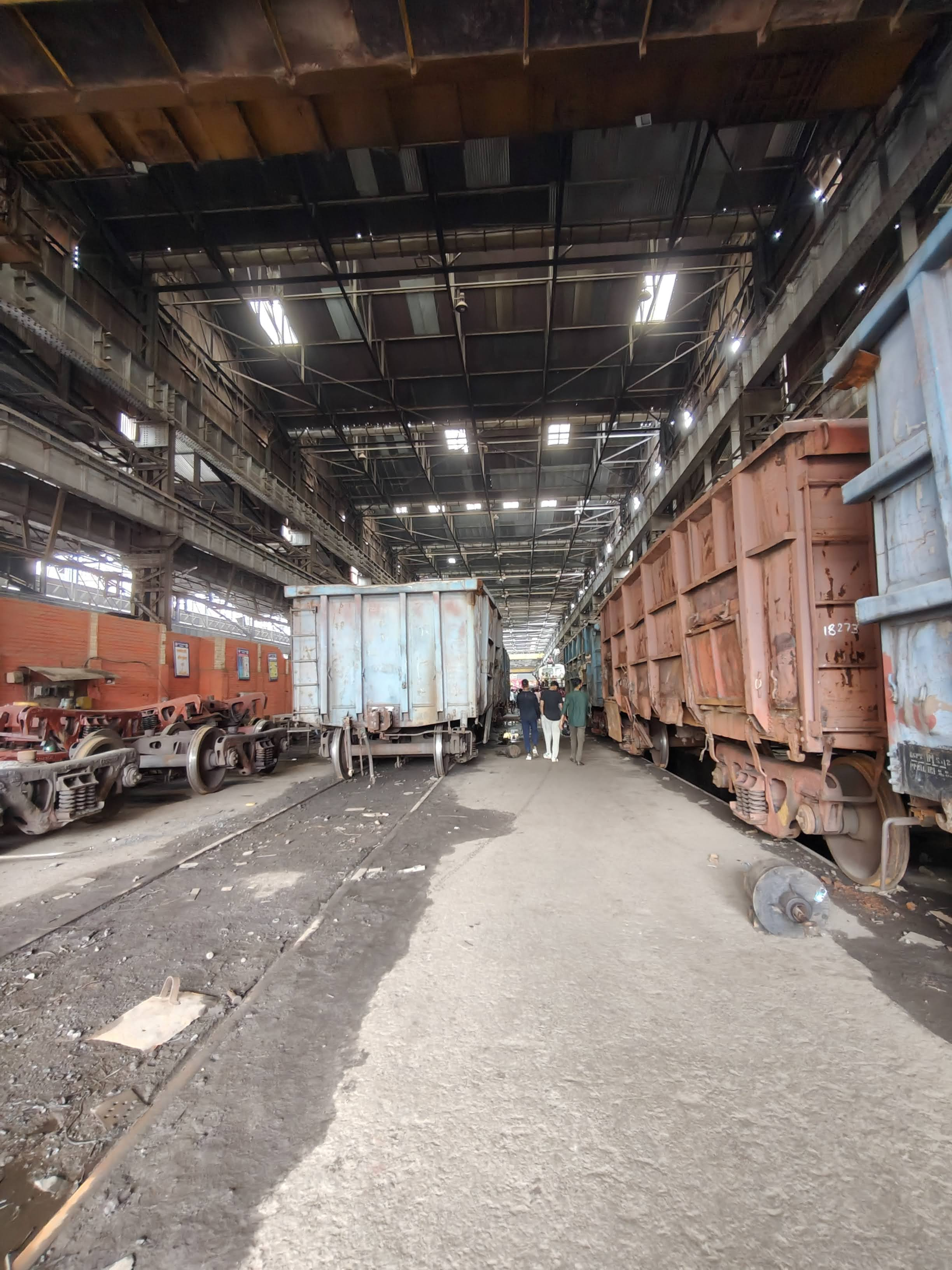
Reparation of wagons

Manufacturing of Axles and Wheels

Wheelset manufacturing: The facility for assembling wheel-axle pairs covers machining, finishing, and assembly for both passenger and freight stock .Backed by a metallurgical lab, captive 5 MVA power plant, and advanced machining shops, Jamalpur’s wheelset lines are well‑equipped.

Production scale: In July 2022, the CASNUB bogie workshop turned out 1,336 bogies and 2,848 wheel sets in a single month—its best-ever performance.

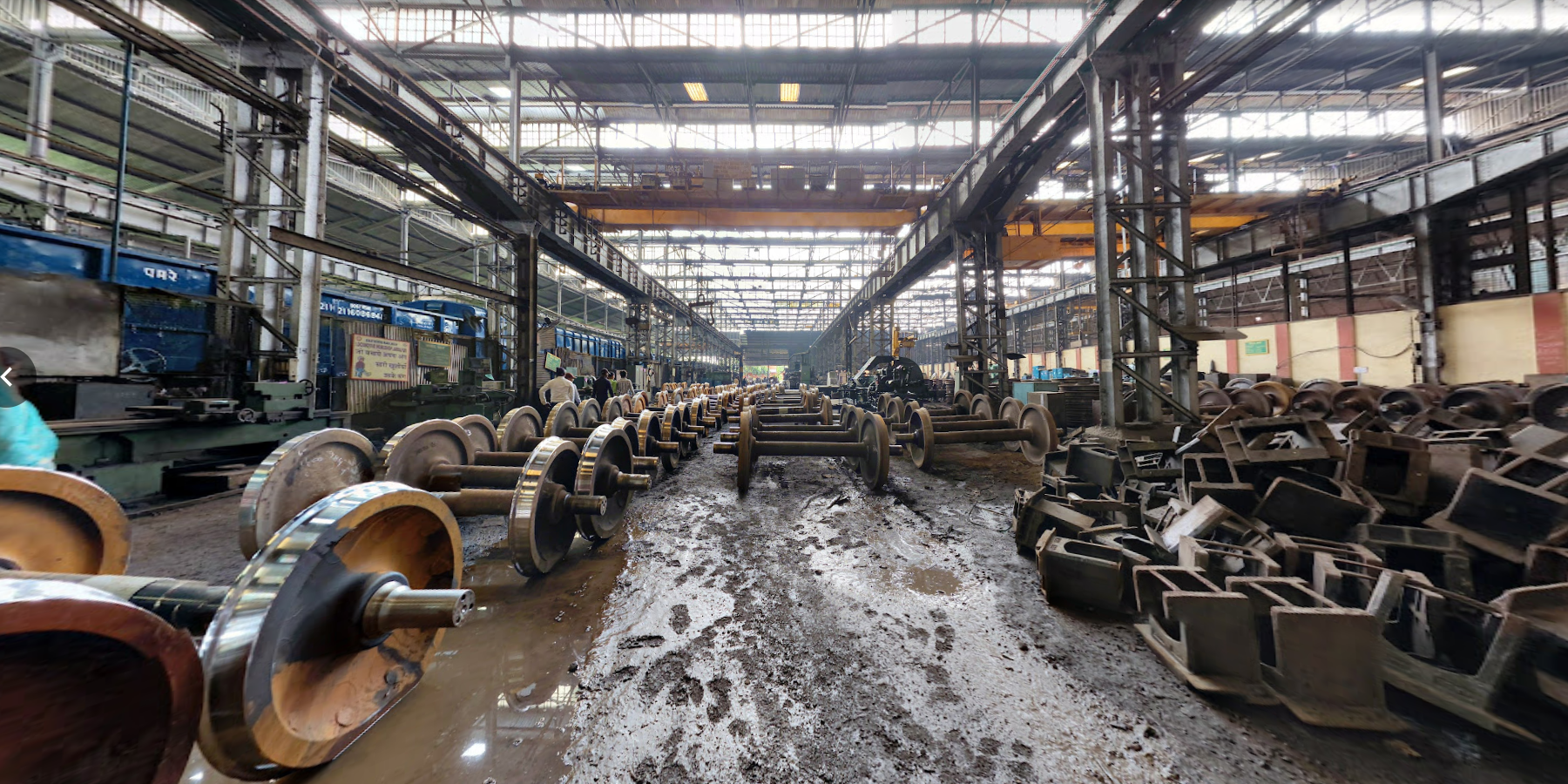
Construction of wheels at Jamalpur Locomotive Workshop

=== Manufacturing of 20 T crane ===
The 20 tonne diesel crane is a rail-mounted, diesel operated, BG (Broad Gauge) transportation crane. The crane is extensively used by Mechanical Department of Indian Railway in sick lines for maintenance of wagons/coaches and Transportation Department Indian Railway for handling of goods.

The first four 20 tonne diesel cranes were manufactured in 1980–81 with a mechanical control system.

Later the control system was changed to pneumatic as per RDSO Specification No. CR.D.122/90. Since 89–90 the shop has been manufacturing the 20 Tonne cranes as per this specification and has manufactured many such cranes.

=== Manufacturing of Jamalpur jacks ===
The Jamalpur jacks have been gaining in popularity chiefly due to low initial capital investment and minimum maintenance needs. It is worthwhile to mention that the performance and cost factor of these jacks have posed a serious challenge to capital intensive electrical overhead-traveling cranes.

Besides Indian Railways, these Jamalpur jacks have been operating successfully at various steel plants and allied industries.

==== Special features ====
The Jamalpur jack has a capacity to lift a load of 25 tonnes (24.6 long tons; 27.6 short tons) and four such jacks make one complete set with a total lifting capacity of 100 tonnes. These Jacks can be operated simultaneously or individually.

==== Construction features ====
The jack is rigid and robust. The upright column is fabricated and welded to the cast-steel gearbox. The elevating screw is provided with buttress thread supported with single-acting thrust ball-bearing having a spherical seating at the top and self-aligning ball-bearing at the bottom. This imparts self-aligning properties to the screw under loaded condition. The elevating screw is under tension when loaded and hence there is no chance of distortion due to buckling. While lifting the load, the jack rests firmly on its base. For movement from one place to another, the lifting carriage is to be lowered by pressing the yoke which lifts the base and the Jack rests on the three wheels with a ground clearance of 20mm.

==== Utility ====
Jamalpur jacks have been designed for:

- Lifting Diesel/Electric Loco for inspection and maintenance.
- Wheeling and de-wheeling in Sheds/Workshops/C&W Depot.
- Various other lifting purposes with suitable adaptors.

=== Tower cars ===
Jamalpur workshop is also involved in manufacturing of different tower cars such as Mark-II, Mark-III, Mark-IV, DHTC/JMP
