= Jamalpur, Bihar =

Jamalpur
- City
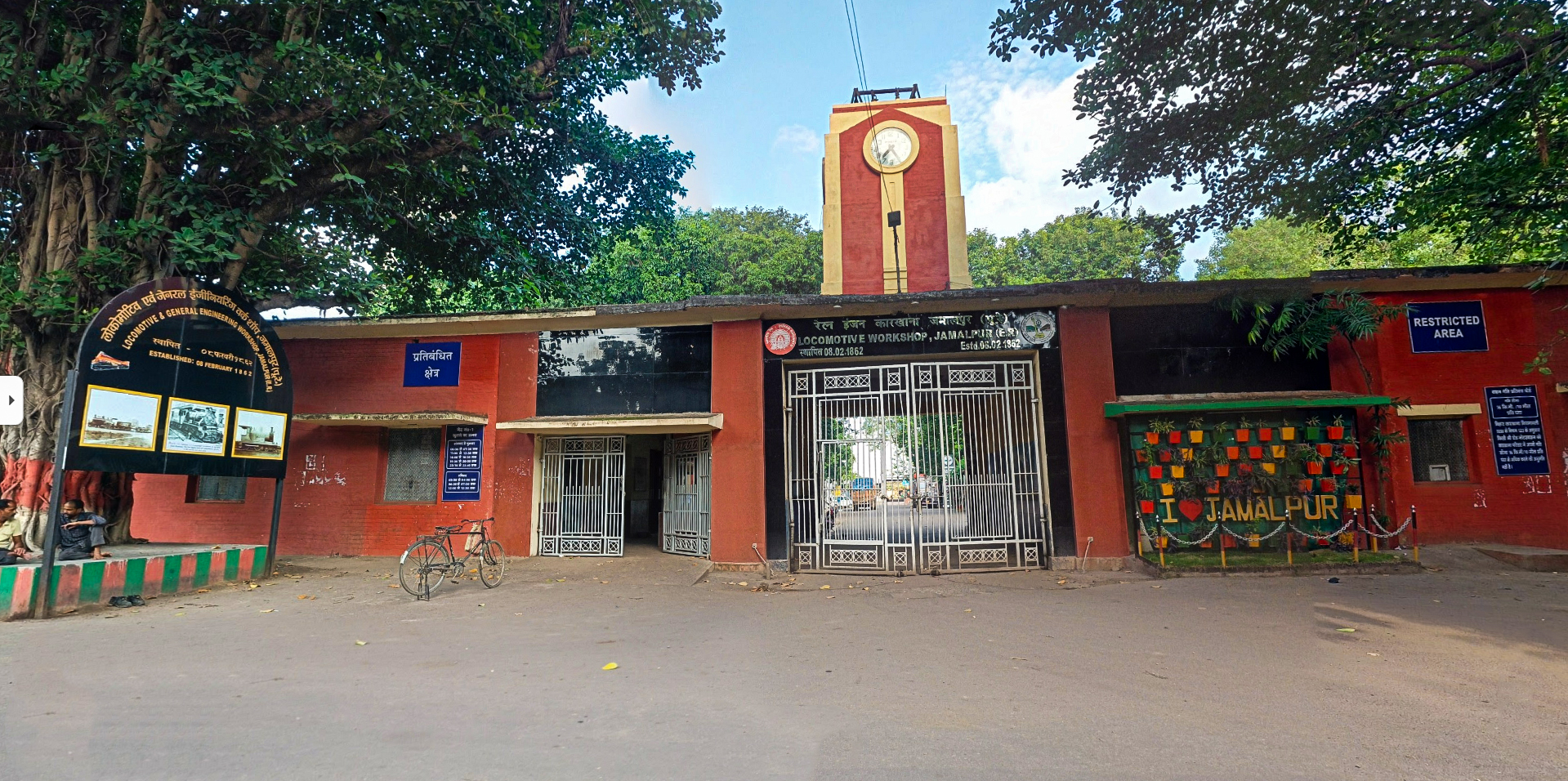
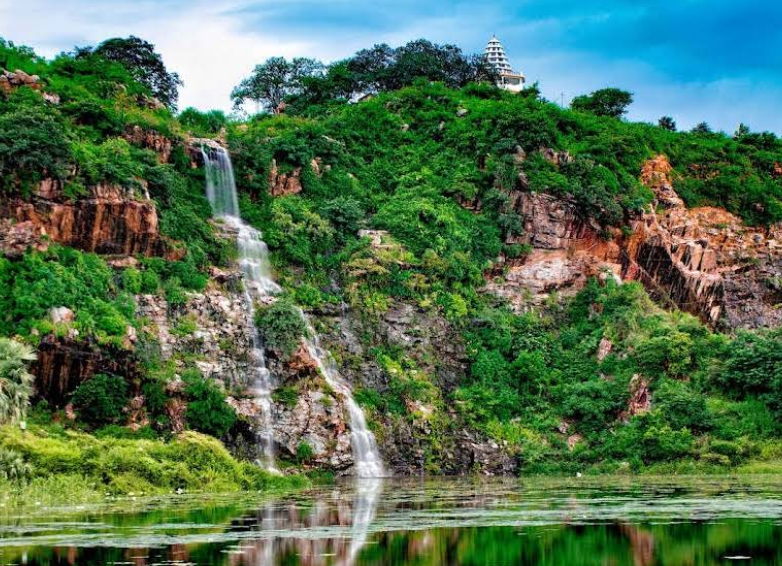
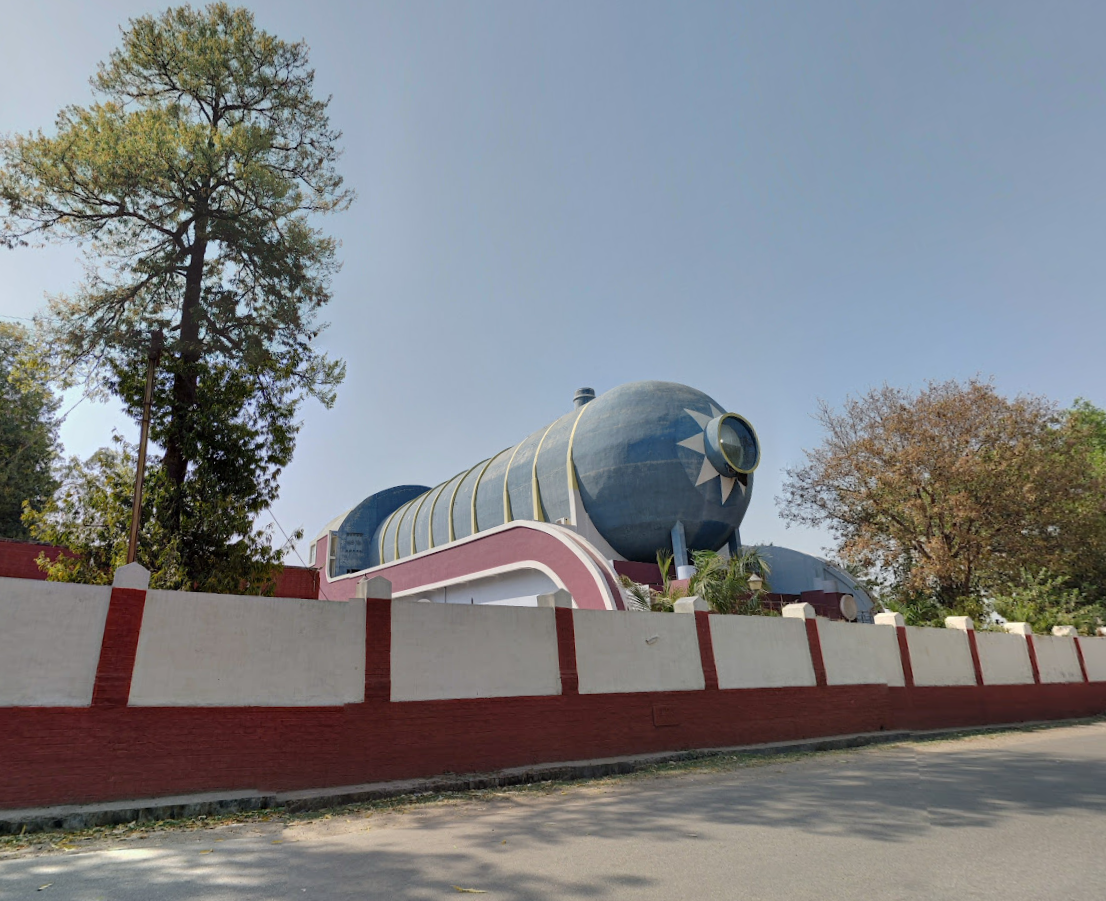
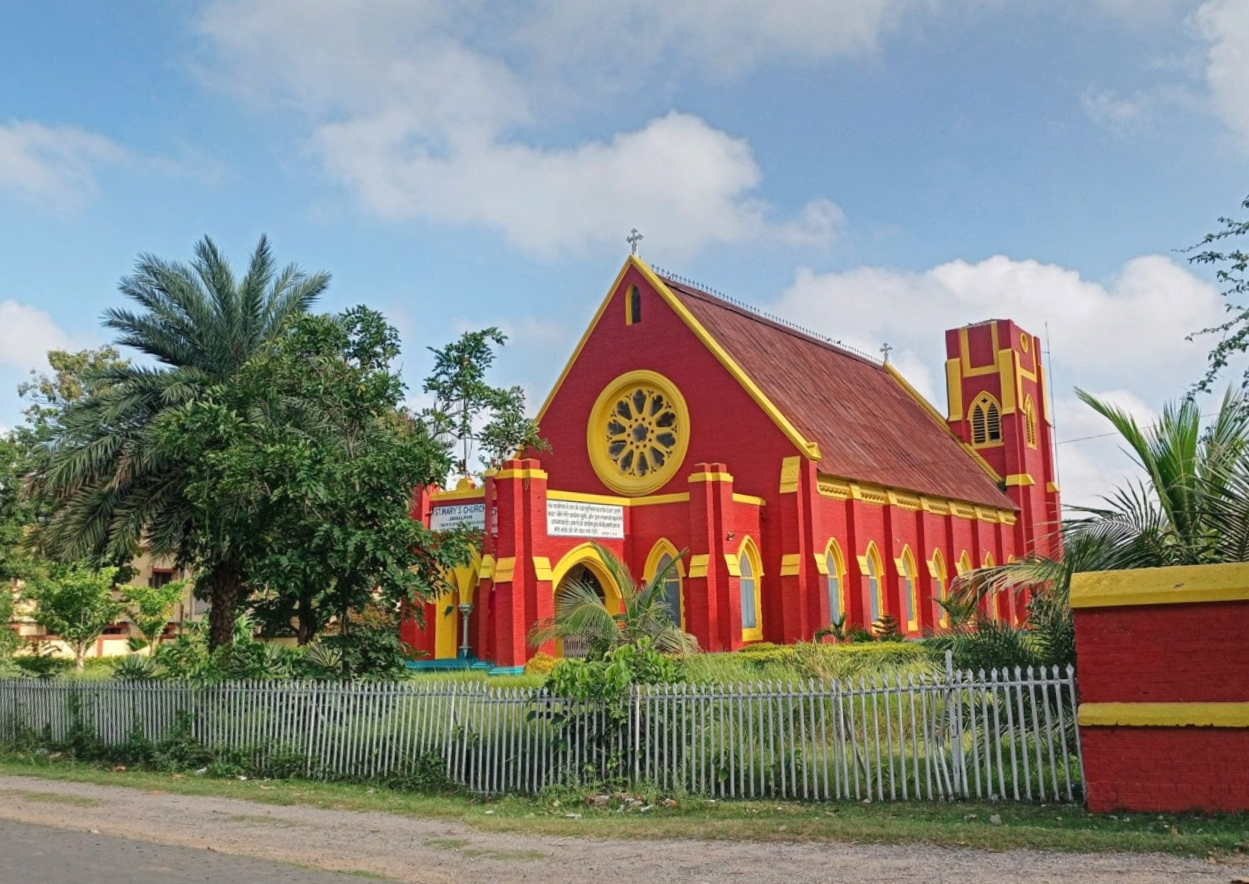
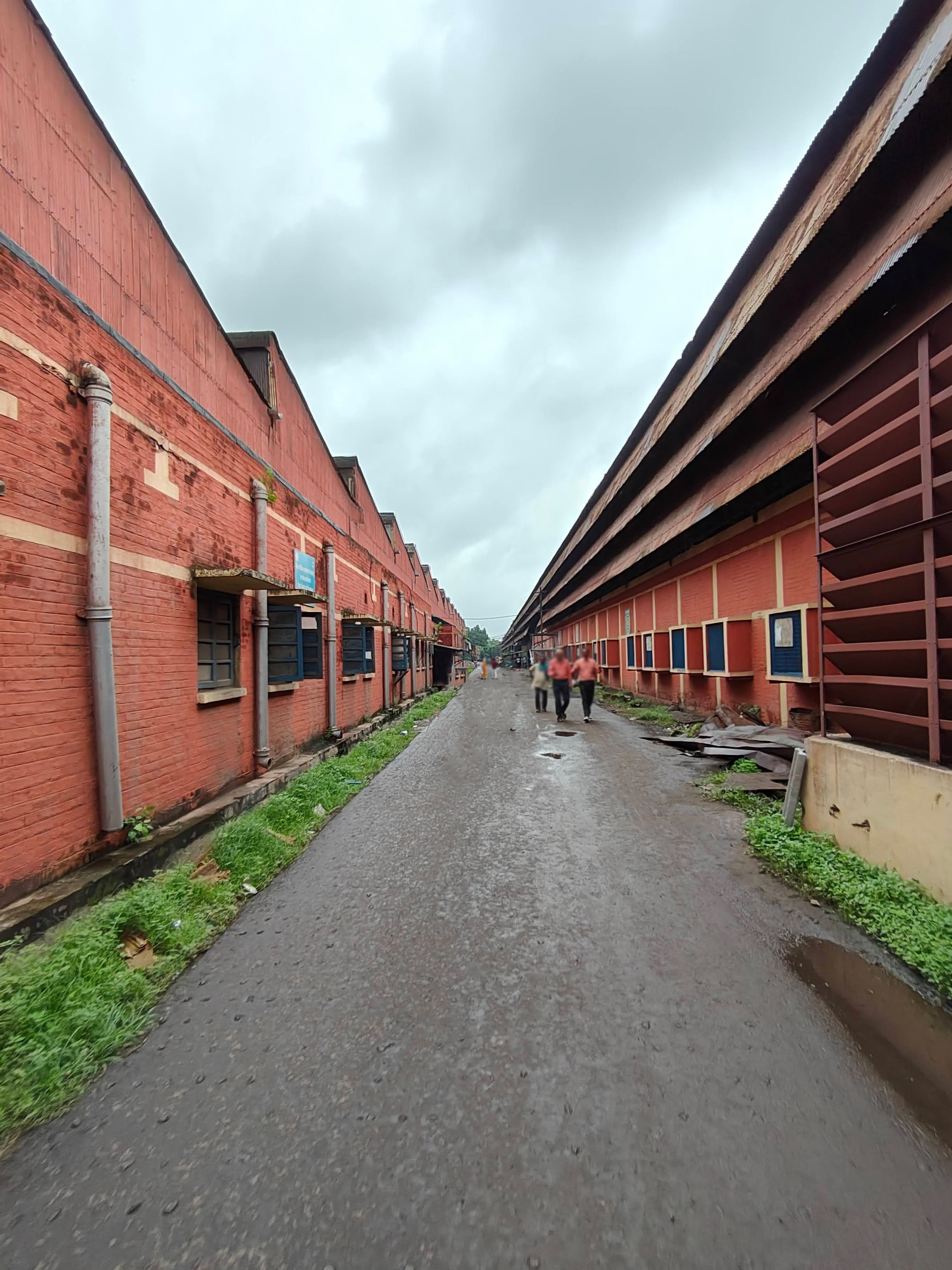
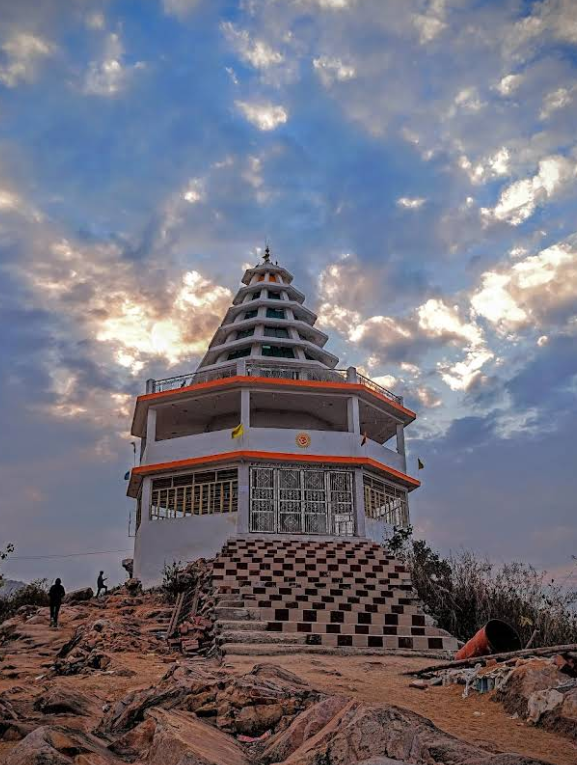
- Jamalpur Locomotive Workshop Jamalpur Waterfalls IRIMEE Jamalpur St. Mary's Church in East Colony Corridor of Jamalpur Locomotive Workshop RadhaKrishana Temple at Kali Pahadi
- Nickname: Rail Nagri
- Location in Bihar, India
- Coordinates: 25°18′N 86°30′E
- Country: India
- State: Bihar
- District: Munger
- Region: Ang Pradesh

Government
  - Type: Municipal Council
  - Body: Jamalpur Municipal Council
- Area: 90 km^{2} (35 sq mi)
- Elevation: 151 m (495 ft)
- Population: 105,221
  - Rank: 26th in Bihar
  - Density: 1,200/km^{2} (3,000/sq mi)
- Demonym: Jamalpur

Languages bhojpuri
  - Official: Hindi
  - Regional: Angika

Literacy
  - Total: 87.38%
  - Male: 92.58%
  - Female: 81.40%
- Time zone: UTC+5:30 (IST)
- PIN: 811214
- Vehicle registration: BR-08
- Sex ratio: 871 females per 1000 males ♂/♀
- Website: www.mungerjamalpur.com

Jamalpur is a city in the Indian state of Bihar. It is situated 9 km from the Munger city centre. Jamalpur is a part of Munger-Jamalpur twin cities. It is main railhead for reaching Munger city.

Jamalpur is best known for the Jamalpur Locomotive Workshop, which employs more than 25,000 people at its training institution, The Indian Railways Institute of Mechanical and Electrical Engineering. Annual turnover is Rs. 10.56 billion with 111,485 employees. This is Asia's largest and oldest locomotive railway workshop. The city was established in 1862 during the British Raj, with the Railways Institute forming its cultural hub.

== Demographics ==
As of the 2011 census, Jamalpur had a population of 399,697, with a ratio of 880 females for every 1,000 males. The average literacy rate is 87.38%; for men it is 92.58%, and for women it is 81.40%. There are 15,543 children in Jamalpur aged 0 to 6, with a ratio of 876 girls for every 1,000 boys.

== Etymology ==
Jamalpur is named after 16th century Sufi saint Jamal Baba, whose dargah (shrine) is still present at East Colony Hospital Road, Jamalpur.

== Geography ==
Jamalpur is located at 25.314236°N 86.489525°E with an average elevation of 151 metres (495 ft).

The suburb is a part of the Munger city. The city centre of Munger is 8 kilometres (5.0 mi) northwest of the Jamalpur area of Munger city. There is a road as well as a rail link, Munger Ganga Bridge, which was completed recently. Jamalpur is an overnight rail or road journey from Kolkata.

The nearest airport is Munger Airport near the Safiyabad area of Munger city. The nearest commercial, domestic airport is Lok Nayak Jayaprakash Airport in Patna, 199 kilometres (124 mi) away. The nearest international airport is Netaji Subhas Chandra Bose International Airport in Kolkata, 460 kilometres (290 mi) from Jamalpur on NH 33.

== History ==
The city was established in 1862 during the British Raj, with the Railways Institute forming its cultural hub.

The Paleolithic site of "Kali Pahar," atop Jamalpur Hill, was the location of an important find of Early and Middle Stone Age quartzite implements.

== Industry and culture ==
=== Locomotive workshop ===
The Jamalpur Locomotive Workshop was the first full-fledged railway workshop facility in India, founded on 8 Feb 1862 by the East Indian Railway Company. The Jamalpur site was chosen for its proximity both to the Sahibganj loop, which was the main trunk route at the time and to the communities of gunsmiths and other mechanical craftsmen in Bihar.

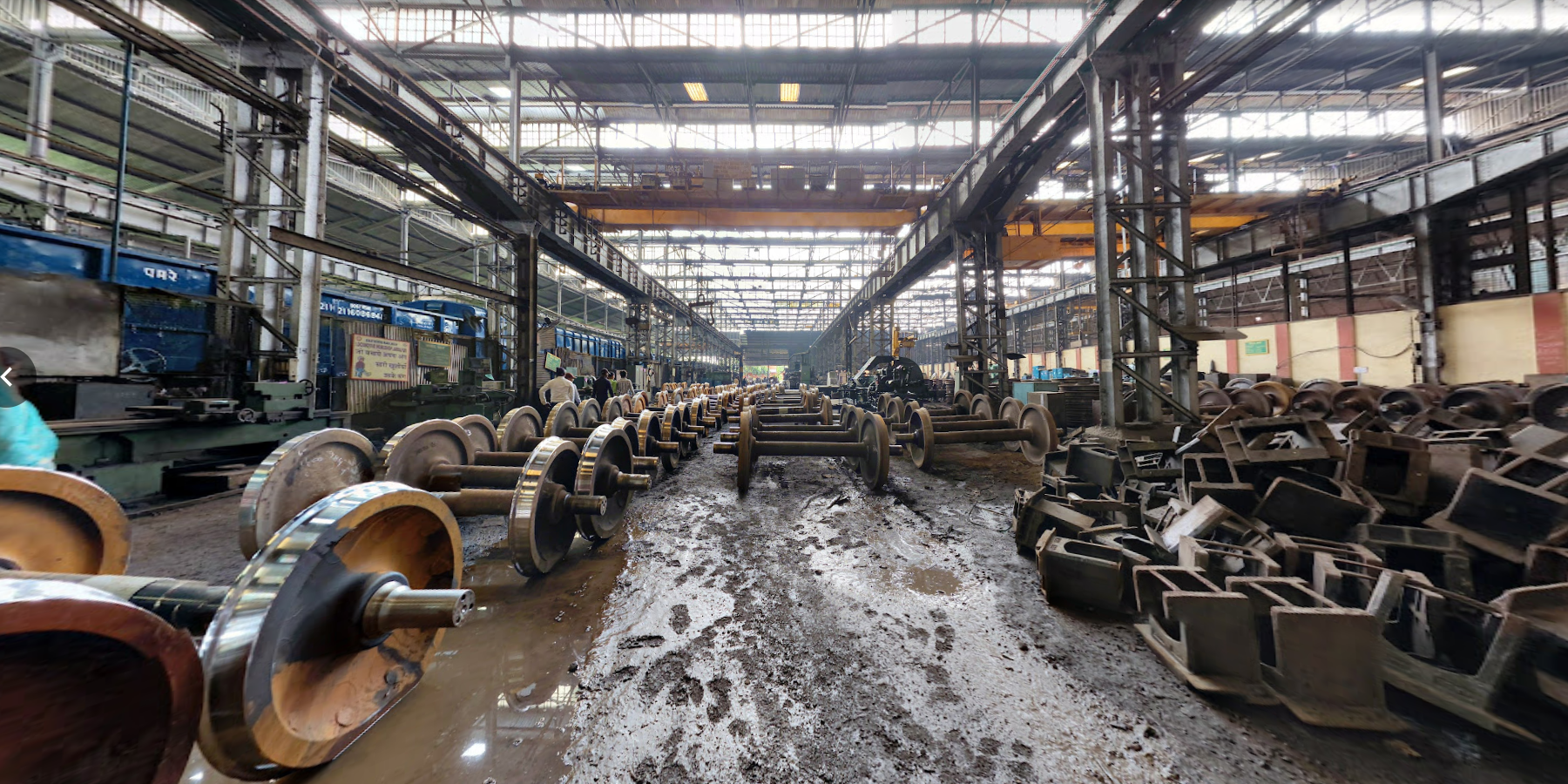
Construction of wheels at Jamalpur Workshop

The workshop was initially for repairing locomotives and assembling new ones from salvaged parts. By the early 20th century, however, it had progressed to producing its own locomotives. It produced the first one, CA 764 "Lady Curzon", in 1899. In 1893, it became the site of the first railway foundry in India. It also had a workshop for repairing and building boilers. Today it has foundry, metallurgical lab facilities, and machine tool facilities. Its rolling mill and nut and bolt shop ceased operation in 1984.

The school attached to the workshop eventually became the Indian Railways Institute of Mechanical and Electrical Engineering (IRIMEE).

=== Ananda Marga ===
The Ananda Marga movement was founded in Jamalpur by native Prabhat Ranjan Sarkar in 1955.

== Places of interest ==
- JSA Stadium, a football stadium
- The Jamalpur Gymkhana, the hostel and club used by the Special Class Railway Apprentices
- The Jamalpur Golf Course, the site of the annual ITC Golf Tournament
- Kali Pahadi, a mountain and picnic spot featuring a temple to the Hindu goddess Kali
- Panchmukhi hanuman mandir, badidariyapur jamalpur
- Jogi asthan durga mandir, rampur basti jamalpur
- Tunnel {jamalpur- bhagalpur train route} near nayagaon, jamalpur
- Baptist Church, albert road, nayagaon, jamalpur
- St. Joseph Catholic church, east colony, jamalpur
- St. Mary's church, golf road, jamalpur
- Gandhi library, Daulatpur, munger road
- Yog maya badi durga devi mandir, Shani Dev Mandir, Sadar Bazar, Jamalpur
- Historical Jamalpur workshop
- Jamalpur filter water works at the top of kali pahadi

== Education ==
=== Colleges ===
==== Engineering ====
- Indian Railway Institute of Mechanical and Electrical Engineering

===== General =====
- Jagjivan Ram Shramik Mahavidyalaya
- Jamalpur College
- Bihar Institute of Management & technology
- Manju Srijan Private ITI
- Techno India NJR Institute of technology

==== Schools ====
- Eastern Railway Mixed Primary School: used to be called "European & Anglo Indian Day School" established more than a century before in 1915.
- Notre Dame Academy, Jamalpur: The first Notre Dame school in India, founded in 1950. Notre Dame Academy is a type of International Catholic Institution managed by the Patna Notre Dame Sisters' Society.
- D.A.V. Public School, Jamalpur is located in Nayatola Keshopur Jamalpur. One of the Top School in Bihar State. This is to +2 Level. It is Arya Samaj society and managing committee of DAV CMC New Delhi. Affiliated to CBSE board.
- Eastern Railway Inter College: A high school for railway employees' children, and one of the oldest high schools in the city.
- Kendriya Vidyalaya, Jamalpur: a CBSE-affiliated Kendriya Vidyalaya set up in 1973 with the sponsorship of the Eastern Railway.
- Parvati Devi High School, Daulatpur, Jamalpur
- St Michael school jamalpur
- Holy family English medium School, Jamalpur, Munger
- St. Roberts School, Jamalpur
- St. Michael High School, Jamalpur
- Collins International School, Jamalpur
- Primary School Jagdishpur, Jamalpur
- Path Bhawan, Jamalpur
- Saraswati Vidya Mandir, Jamalpur
- NC Ghosh Girl's high School, Jamalpur
- St. Columbus high School, Jamalpur
- Shri Shastri School, JAMALPUR is located in mungroura chowk Jamalpur. One of the Top school in munger set up in 1974 (CBSE CURRICULUM)
- St. Mary School, Jamalpur
- Railway Pilot School, Jamalpur
- ATP School, Jamalpur
- Vidya Jyoti Public School, Jamalpur
- Daulatpur School, Jamalpur
- Rampur Primary School, Jamalpur
- Arya Samaj Girls School, Jamalpur
- Central School, Jamalpur
- Potential Kids primary School, Jamalpur
- Achchu Ram School, Jamalpur
- National Glory Academy, Jamalpur
- Saraswati Shishu Mandir, Jamalpur
- Sai Academy, Jamalpur
- St. Xavier School, Jamalpur
- Little Genius Kids School, Jamalpur
- Nirmala Residential School, Jamalpur
- Goodluck Kid's Play School, Jamalpur

== Image Gallery ==
Here are some Images of Point of Interest

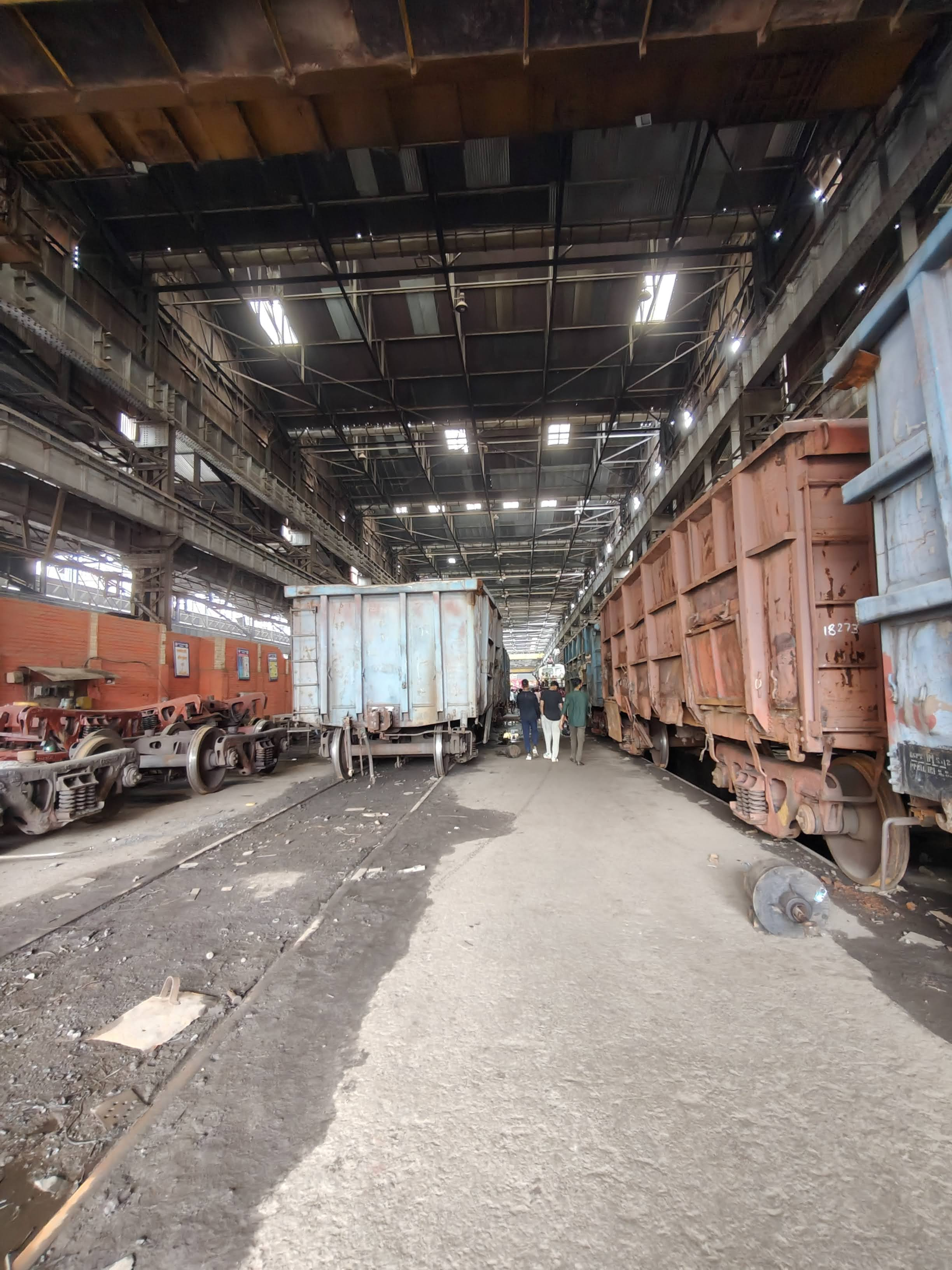
Reparation of wagons at Jamalpur Workshop

== See also ==
- Jamalpur, Munger (Vidhan Sabha constituency)
- Jamalpur Gymkhana
- Jamalpur Locomotive Workshop
- Jamalpur railway station
- List of cities in Bihar by population
