= Rubi Valley Rural Municipality =

Rubi Valley रुबी भ्याली गाउँपालिका
- Rural Municipality
- Location of rural council Rubi Valley (Nepal)
- Coordinates: 28.1766°N 85.0834°E
- Country: Nepal
- Province: Bagmati Province
- District: Dhading
- Wards: 6
- Established: 10 March 2017

Government
  - Type: Rural Council
  - Chairperson: Mr. Ram Singh Tamang
  - Vice-chairperson: Mr. Phe Lama Tamang

Area
  - Total: 401.85 km^{2} (155.16 sq mi)

Population (2011)
  - Total: 9,565
  - Density: 23.80/km^{2} (61.65/sq mi)
- Time zone: UTC+5:45 (Nepal Standard Time)
- Headquarter: Sertung, Dhading
- Website: rubivalleymun.gov.np

Rubi Valley is a rural municipality located within the Dhading District of the Bagmati Province of Nepal. The rural municipality spans 401.85 square kilometres (155.16 sq mi), with a total population of 9,565 according to a 2011 Nepal census.

On March 10, 2017, the Government of Nepal restructured the local level bodies into 753 new local level structures. The previous Lapa, [Sertung], and Tipling VDCs were merged to form Rubi Valley. Rubi Valley is divided into 6 wards, with [Sertung] declared the administrative center of the rural municipality.

Ruby Valley has started the tourism to attract for local destination for its domestic and international guests.

== Demographics ==
At the time of the 2011 Nepal census, Rubi Valley Rural Municipality had a population of 9,562. Of these, 85.4% spoke Tamang, 14.2% Nepali, 0.2% Gurung and 0.3% other languages as their first language.

In terms of ethnicity/caste, 74.1% were Tamang, 12.4% Ghale, 7.9% Gurung, 3.5% Kami, 0.7% Damai/Dholi, 0.5% other Dalit, 0.4% Hill Brahmin, 0.1% Chhetri and 0.3% others.

In terms of religion, 53.3% were Buddhist, 39.1% Christian, 7.4% Hindu and 0.1% others.

In terms of literacy, 45.3% could both read and write, 4.2% could read but not write and 50.4% could neither read nor write.
