= List of University of Allahabad alumni =

This is a list of notable alumni related to the University of Allahabad and its constituent colleges. Excluded from this list are those people whose only connection with Allahabad University is that they were awarded an honorary degree.

== Padma award recipient alumni ==
- Mahadevi Verma
- Bhagwati Charan Verma
- Raghupati Sahay, also known as Firaq Gorakhpuri
- Vidya Niwas Mishra
- Murali Manohar Joshi
- B. D. Pande

== Arts ==
Name	Class Year	Degree	College	Notability	References
Aditya Srivastava			Allahabad University	actor	
Sudhir Dar			Allahabad University	cartoonist	
Tigmanshu dhulia	1983 - 1986	Bachelor of Arts (B.A.)	Allahabad University	Movie director, writer	

== Humanities and social sciences ==
Name	Class Year	Degree	College	Notability	References
S. R. Goyal			Allahabad University	Historian	
Baidyanath Misra	1948	MA, University topper and Gold medallist, First Odia to top the Faculty of Arts and the Department of Economics	Allahabad University	Former Vice-Chancellor of the Odisha University of Agriculture and Technology, Chairman of Odisha State Planning Board and Chairman of Odisha's First State Finance Commission	
Prabhat Nalini Das		MA, English, University Topper and gold medalist	Allahabad University	University Professor and pro Vice Chancellor; first Director/Dean Humanities, IIT Kanpur	
J K Mehta		PhD	Allahabad University	economist	
Udai Prakash Arora				historian	

== Law ==
Name	Class Year	Degree	College	Notability	References
Raghunandan Swarup Pathak		Law	Allahabad University	18th Chief Justice of India; Judge of the International Court of Justice	
Kamal Narain Singh		Law	Ewing Christian	22nd Chief Justice of India	
J. S. Verma		BSc; LLB	Ewing Christian	27th Chief Justice of India	
V. N. Khare			Allahabad University	33rd Chief Justice of India	
Daya Saran Sinha	1953-1959	BA, LLB	Allahabad University	Chief Justice of the Gujarat High Court	
Vidyadhar Govind Oak		LLB	Allahabad University	Chief Justice of the Allahabad High Court	
Prashant Bhushan		LLB	Allahabad University	Supreme Court lawyer	
Vashishtha Bhargava	1925	M.Sc.	Allahabad University	Judge of the Supreme Court of India	
Rajendra Kumar Acharya		PhD	Allahabad University	jurist of Law of tort in Nepal	

Milon K. Banerji, attorney general for India

== Literature and journalism ==
- Doodhnath Singh – Hindi writer and critic
- Harivansh Rai Bachchan – Famous hindi poet and father of Amitabh Bachchan.
- Prabhat Nalini Das – public intellectual and Professor; Head, English Department, Lady Shri Ram College; First Director-Dean, Humanities, IIT Kanpur; Founder-Professor and Head, Department of English, Lady Shri Ram College, Delhi University; Pro Vice Chancellor, NEHU-Kohima Campus; English
- Gopinath Kaviraj – philosopher; Sanskrit scholar
- Vibhuti Narain Rai renowned writer and novelist, former Director General of Police of Uttar Pradesh, former Vice Chancellor of Mahatma Gandhi Antarrashtriya Hindi Vishwavidyalaya.
- Prem Chand Pandey – founding director of the National Centre for Polar and Ocean Research; recipient of SSB Prize
- Ibn-e-Safi, Jasosi writer
- Mohammad Uzair, Sitara-i-Imtiaz
- Rafiq Hussain, Urdu writer, poet, academic, author, head of Urdu Department Allahabad University
- Dharamvir Bharati, writer
- Kamleshwar, writer
- Mrinal Pande, writer
- Neelum Saran Gour, author and academic
- Govind Mishra, Hindi writer and former chairman of CBDT
- Ravindra Khattree, Distinguished Professor, statistician, academic, author
- Acharya Narendra Dev
- Chandradhar Sharma Guleri, writer
- Krishna Kumar Sharma, Quit India Movement activist, poet and literary figure
- Fani Badayuni Urdu poet.
- Yagyadutt Sharma, Hindi novelist, writer and poet
- Ram Chandra Shukla, painter
- Surya Bahadur Thapa
- Daulat Singh Kothari, physicist
- Harish Chandra, mathematician
- Pankaj Mishra, author
- Lakshmi Raj Sharma, author and academic
- K. Banerjee, physicist and ex-Director of Indian Association for the Cultivation of Science
- Leema Dhar, author, poet and columnist

== Military ==
Name	Class Year	Notability	References
Krishnaswamy Sundarji		Chief of Army Staff	

== Politics ==
=== Heads of state and government ===
Name	Class Year	Degree	College	Notability	References
Chandra Shekhar	1951			8th Prime Minister of India	
Gulzarilal Nanda				acting Prime Minister of India	
Surya Bahadur Thapa				24th Prime Minister of Nepal	
Zakir Husain		MA	Muhammadan Anglo-Oriental (Note: The Muhammadan Anglo Oriental College (now known as Aligarh Muslim University) was affiliated to the University of Allahabad between 1885 and 1920.)	3rd President of India	
V. P. Singh				7th Prime Minister of India	
Shankar Dayal Sharma				9th President of India	

=== Others ===
Name	Class Year	Degree	College	Notability	References
Arjun Singh				12th Chief Minister of Madhya Pradesh	
Feroze Gandhi			Ewing Christian	former Member of parliament, Lok Sabha	
Gopal Swarup Pathak				former Vice President of India	
Govind Ballabh Pant				former Chief Minister of Uttar Pradesh and Minister of Home Affairs	
Hemwati Nandan Bahuguna				8th Chief Minister of Uttar Pradesh	
Madan Lal Khurana				3rd Chief Minister of Delhi	
Madan Mohan Malaviya				former President of the Indian National Congress	
Motilal Nehru				former President of the Indian National Congress	
Narayan Dutt Tiwari				9th Chief Minister of Uttar Pradesh; 3rd Chief Minister of Uttarakhand	
Naresh Chandra				former Governor of Gujarat and Indian Ambassador to the United States	
Nikhil Kumar		MA		former Governor of Kerala	
Purushottam Das Tandon				former Member of parliament, Lok Sabha	
Rajendra Kumari Bajpai				former Lieutenant Governor of Pondicherry	
Saiyid Nurul Hasan					
Satyendra Narayan Sinha				19th Chief Minister of Bihar	
Shanti Bhushan				former Minister of Law and Justice	
Vijay Bahuguna				6th Chief Minister of Uttarakhand	

- Vinod Kumar Yadav, IRSEE officer and Chairman of the Indian Railways Board
- Jagmohan Yadav, IPS, former Director General of Uttar Pradesh Police.
- Rajju Bhaiya, Ex-RSS Chief
- Murli Manohar Joshi, former Minister of Home Affairs and Minister of Human Resource Development
- Janeshwar Mishra, Ex-Minister Govt. of India
- Sir Syed Wazir Hasan, Chief Justice of Awadh Chief Court
- Mohan Singh, National General secretary, Samajwadi Party
- Ram Niwas Mirdha, former cabinet minister
- Dharmendra Yadav, Member of the Lok Sabha
- N. C. Saxena, IAS Officer, member of Planning Commission of India

== Science and technology ==
Name	Class Year	Degree	College	Notability	References
Atma Ram (scientist)		Doctor of Science		Chemist, Founding Director Central Glass and Ceramic Research Institute and Director General CSIR	
Anuradha Misra				physicist	
Prem Chand Pandey				Scientist, Academic and Founding Director NCAOR, Shanti Swarup Bhatnagar laureate	
Deepak Dhar				theoretical physicist, Shanti Swarup Bhatnagar laureate	
Digvijai Singh				chemical engineer, Shanti Swarup Bhatnagar laureate	
Jamuna Sharan Singh				ecologist, Shanti Swarup Bhatnagar Prize recipient	
Nibir Mandal				structural geologist, Shanti Swarup Bhatnagar laureate	
Krityunjai Prasad Sinha				theoretical physicist, Shanti Swarup Bhatnagar laureate	
Prabhu Lal Bhatnagar	1939	DPhil		mathematician	
Onkar Singh	1991, 2000	M.E., PhD	Motilal Nehru Regional Engineering College	Mechanical Engineering, Vice-Chancellor of Veer Madho Singh Bhandari Uttarakhand Technical University, founder Vice-Chancellor of Madan Mohan Malaviya University of Technology, Gorakhpur	

== Sports ==
Name	Class Year	Notability	References
Manuel Aaron		chess player and International Master	

== Others ==
Name	Class Year	Notability	References
Rajendra Singh Rana		environmentalist, Magsaysay Award, 2001	

- R. N. Kao, former IPS officer, founder and first director of R&AW
- Maharishi Mahesh Yogi, known for Transcendental Meditation
- Uttar Kumar, film actor
- M. A. Ansari, pre-partition Royal Indian Navy Education Officer
- Udit Raj, social activist
- Prem Matiyani (1950– 2016), theatre director, Sangeet Natak Akademi Award (2001)
- Vivek Sahai, former Chairman Railway Board
- Desh Deepak Verma, Former 1978-batch IAS officer, former Secretary General of the Rajya Sabha (2017-2021).

== See also ==
- List of people associated with Allahabad
- Allahabad
