= Vinay Mittal =

Indian civil servant (born 1953)

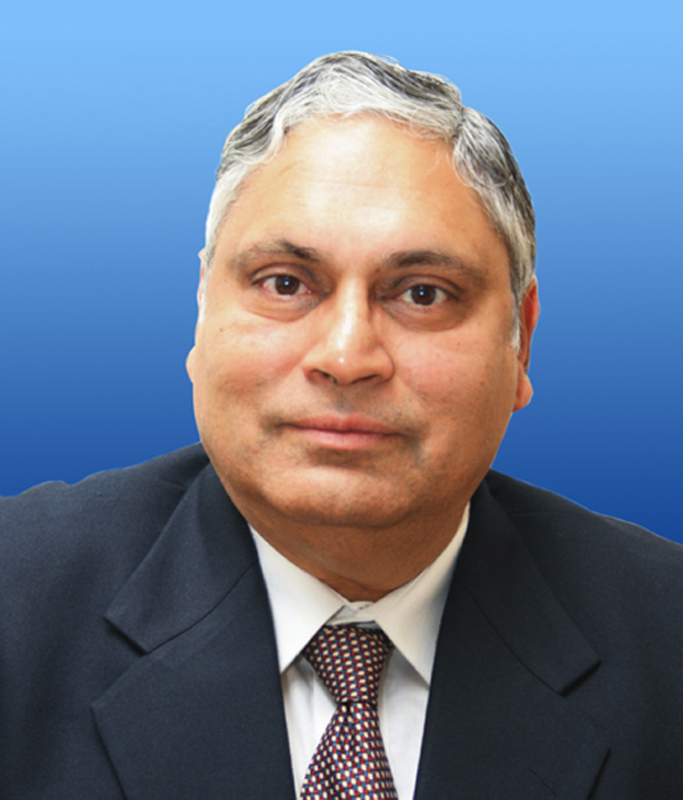

Chairman, Union Public Service Commission
- In office 22 January 2018 – 19 June 2018
- Preceded by: David R. Syiemlieh
- Succeeded by: Arvind Saxena

Chairman, Railway Board (CRB)
- In office 1 July 2011 – 30 June 2013
- Preceded by: Vivek Sahai
- Succeeded by: Arunendra Kumar

Personal details
- Born: 20 June 1953 (age 73) Saharanpur, Uttar Pradesh, India
- Education: Doon School, Dehradun; St. Stephen's College, Delhi; Delhi University
- Occupation: Civil servant (Indian Railway Traffic Service)

Vinay Mittal (born 20 June 1953) is an Indian Civil servant who worked for the Indian Railway Traffic Service. He served as Chairman of the Union Public Service Commission from January 2018 to June 2018 and Chairman of Railway Board from July 2011 to June 2013.

== Personal life ==
Born in Saharanpur, Uttar Pradesh, Vinay Mittal studied at the Doon School, Dehradun. He graduated with a Bachelor of Arts(Hons.) in English literature from the St. Stephen's College, Delhi. Mittal studied law at the Delhi University.

== Career in the Indian Railways ==
He joined the Indian Railway Traffic Service in 1975. He served as the Divisional Railway Manager, Bilaspur; Additional general manager, Central Railway and general manager, North Western Railway from 2009 to 2011. Mittal also worked as the executive director, Traffic Transportation (Movement) in the Railway Board.

Mittal served as the Chairman, Railway Board (CRB) from 1 July 2011 to 30 June 2013. In his capacity as the Chairman of the Railway Board, Mittal functioned as the Ex-Officio Chairman of the Dedicated Freight Corridor Corporation of India. During Mittal's tenure, the project of the Dedicated Freight Corridor Corporation of India achieved much progress including completion of over 90% of land acquisition, obtaining necessary environmental and forest clearances, etc. Mittal played a major role in ensuring that all the Public Sector Undertakings under the Indian Ministry of Railways (expect the Dedicated Freight Corridor Corporation of India and Indian Railway Finance Corporation were granted autonomy with the redesignation of their Heads of Office as Chairman-cum-Managing Directors.

== Awards and honours ==
Vinay Mittal has been awarded prestigious Railway Minister's Award (MR Award) in 1981.

He was honoured with the Certificate in Transport Management and Containerization by the University of Wales, College of Cardiff, United Kingdom and received the Best Project Award by the Department of Maritime Studies and International Transport. During his tenure as general manager, North Western Railway from 2009 to 2011, the North Western Railway zone achieved significant infrastructural and operational improvements. The North Western Railway zone won 5 inter-railway Shields in 2011 during the 56th Railway Week celebrations.

== Union Public Service Commission ==
He was appointed as a Member of the Union Public Service Commission on 8 August 2013. He served as the Commission's Chairman from 22 January 2018 to 19 June 2018.
