= Chairperson of the Railway Board =

Chief executive of the Indian Railways

Chairperson of Railway Board
- State Emblem of India

- Flag of India
- Incumbent; Satish Kumar
- Ministry of Railways
- Type: Department
- First holder: Fateh Chand Badhwar

The Chairperson and CEO of the Indian Railway Board is the administrative head of the Indian Railways, which functions under the overall control of the Parliament of India through the Minister of Railways. The chairperson also serves as ex-officio Principal Secretary to the Government of India for the Ministry of Railways.

== History ==
=== British Raj ===
The Indian Railway Board was constituted in 1922, with a Chief Commissioner of Railways as its head, who was solely responsible to the Government for decisions on technical matters and for advising the Government on matters of policy.

=== After Independence ===
In April, 1951 the post of chief commissioner was abolished and the seniormost functional member was appointed the chairman of the board.

== List of heads of Indian Railways ==
=== Chief Commissioners of Railway, 1922–51 ===
List of chief commissioners of railway
S. No.	Name	From	To	Duration (months)
1	Sir Clement Hindley	01.11.1922	11.10.1928	63
2	Sir Austen Hadow	12.10.1928	15.10.1929	12
3	Sir Guthrie Russell	16.10.1929	16.07.1940	128
4	Sir Leonard Wildson	17.07.1940	17.08.1944	49
5	Sir Arthur Griffin	12.09.1944	19.05.1946	20
6	Col RB Emerson	20.05.1946	10.09.1947	16
7	K. C. Bakhle	11.09.1947	31.03.1951	42

=== Chairperson Railway Board, 1951–present ===
List of Chairperson Railway Board
S. No.	Name	Cadre	From	To	Duration (months)
1	FC Badhwar	IRSE	01.04.1951	30.09.1954	42
2	G Pande	IRSE	01.10.1954	31.12.1956	26
3	PC Mukherjee	IRSE	01.01.1957	25.06.1959	30
4	KB Mathur	IRTS	30.06.1959	18.04.1960	10
5	Karnail Singh	IRSE	18.04.1960	16.08.1962	35
6	DC Baijal	IRSE	16.08.1962	07.08.1965	26
7	Kripal Singh	IRSE	07.08.1965	21.01.1967	17
8	GD Khandelwal	IRTS	21.01.1967	06.01.1970	36
9	BC Ganguli	IRSE	07.01.1970	12.10.1971	21
10	BSD Baliga	IRSE	13.10.1971	12.10.1973	24
11	MN Bery	IRSE	12.10.1973	30.04.1976	31
12	GP Warrier	IRSE	01.05.1975	31.08.1977	16
13	KS Rajan	IRSME	01.09.1977	03.06.1979	21
14	M Menezes	IRSE	04.06.1979	16.11.1980	16
15	MS Gujral	IRTS	17.11.1980	06.02.1983	27
16	KTV Raghvan	IRSME	05.04.1983	31.01.1985	23
17	JP Gupta	IRSME	01.02.1985	30.06.1985	5
18	Prakash Narain	IRTS	01.07.1985	31.06.1987	24
19	RK Jain	IRSE	01.07.1987	31.07.1989	25
20	MN Prasad	IRSE	01.08.1989	31.07.1990	12
21	RD Kitson	IRSME	01.08.1990	31.03.1992	20
22	YP Anand	IRSE	01.04.1992	31.12.1992	9
23	AN Shukla	IRSME	01.01.1993	31.03.1994	15
24	MK Rao	IRSME	31.03.1994	30.06.1994	3
25	Ashok Bhatnagar	IRTS	01.07.1994	31.05.1995	11
26	GK Khare	IRSME	01.06.1995	30.06.1996	13
27	CL Kaw	IRTS	01.07.1996	30.04.1997	10
28	M Ravindra	IRSE	30.04.1997	31.12.1997	9
29	VK Agrawal	IRSE	31.12.1997	31.08.2000	32
30	Ashok Kumar	IRSME	01.09.2000	31.08.2001	12
31	RN Malhotra	IRSE	31.08.2001	31.03.2002	7
32	IIMS Rana	IRSE	01.04.2002	30.06.2003	15
33	RK Singh	IRSE	30.06.2003	31.07.2005	24
34	JP Batra	IRTS	01.08.2005	31.07.2007	24
35	KC Jena	IRTS	31.08.2007	31.01.2009	17
36	S S Khurana	IRSEE	02.02.2009	31.05.2010	16
37	Vivek Sahai	IRTS	01.06.2010	30.06.2011	13
38	Vinay Mittal	IRTS	01.07.2011	30.06.2013	24
39	Arunendra Kumar	IRSME	30.06.2013	31.12.2014	18
40	A.K.Mittal<	IRSS	31.12.2014	23.08.2017	31
41	Ashwani Lohani	IRSME	23.08.2017	31.12.2018	16
42	Vinod Kumar Yadav	IRSEE	31.12.2018	31.12.2020	24
43	Suneet Sharma	IRSME	31.12.2020	31.12.2021	12
44	Vinay Kumar Tripathi	IRSEE	01.01.2022	31.12.2022	12
45	Anil Kumar Lahoti	IRSE	01.01.2023	31.08.2023	8
46	Jaya Varma Sinha(First woman Chairperson)	IRTS	01.09.2023	31.08.2024	12
47	Satish Kumar(First Dalit Chairperson)	IRSME	01.09.2024	Incumbent	
