= Yogendra Narain =

Former Chief Secretary of Uttar Pradesh

Secretary General of the Rajya Sabha
- In office 1 September 2002 – 14 September 2007
- Preceded by: Ramesh Chandra Tripathi
- Succeeded by: V. K Agnihotri

28th Defence Secretary of India
- In office 20 October 2000 – 30 June 2002
- Preceded by: T. R. Prasad
- Succeeded by: Subir Dutt

32nd Chief Secretary of Uttar Pradesh
- In office 2 April 1998 – 20 October 2000
- Preceded by: Ravindra Shankar Kumar
- Succeeded by: B. N. Tiwari

Water Resources Secretary of India
- In office 1 April 1997 – 1 April 1998

Personal details
- Born: 26 May 1942 (age 84) United Provinces, British India (now Uttar Pradesh, India)
- Occupation: Retired IAS officer
- Awards: Dean Paul H. Appleby Award (2017)

Yogendra Narain (born 26 June 1942) is a 1965 batch retired Indian Administrative Service (IAS) officer of Uttar Pradesh cadre. He is a former Secretary General of the Rajya Sabha. He also served as the Defence Secretary of India, Chief Secretary of Uttar Pradesh, Surface Transport Secretary of India. He is the current Chancellor of Hemwati Nandan Bahuguna Garhwal University (HNBGU) situated in Pauri Garhwal district of Uttrakhand. From 2007 to 2017, he was serving as Director at Reliance Power and Reliance Infrastructure.

== Education ==
Yogendra Narain holds a diploma in Development Economics. He is also a graduate (BSc) in Physical Chemistry and a postgraduate (MA) in Political Science. He also holds MPhil and PhD degrees.

== Career ==
Yogendra Narain served in various key positions for both the Government of India and the Government of Uttar Pradesh, like as the Chief Secretary of Uttar Pradesh, first Chairman of Greater NOIDA, Principal Secretary (Information), Principal Secretary to the Chief Minister of Uttar Pradesh, Principal Secretary to the Governor of Uttar Pradesh, Secretary (Power and Irrigation) and as the District Magistrate and Collector of Lucknow and Muzaffarnagar districts in the Government of Uttar Pradesh, and as the Union Defence Secretary, Union Surface Transport Secretary, first Chairman of National Highways Authority of India and as the Joint Secretary (Ports) in the Ministry of Surface Transport in the Union Government.

=== Surface Transport Secretary ===
Narain was appointed the Union Surface Transport Secretary by the Appointments Committee of the Cabinet (ACC), he assumed the office on 1 April 1997 and demitted it on 1 April 1998.

=== Chief Secretary of Uttar Pradesh ===
Narain was appointed the Chief Secretary of Uttar Pradesh by the Chief Minister of Uttar Pradesh, he assumed the office on Chief Secretary on 2 April 1998 and demitted it on 20 October 2000, serving as the state's top bureaucrat for more than two years.

=== Defence Secretary ===
Narain was appointed the Union Defence Secretary by the Appointments Committee of the Cabinet, he assumed the office on 20 October 2000 and demitted it on 30 June 2002.

=== Secretary-General of Rajya Sabha ===
Narain was appointed the Secretary General of the Rajya Sabha, the upper house of the Indian Parliament by the Vice President of India and ex-officio Chairman of Rajya Sabha, he assumed the office of 1 September 2002 and demitted it on 14 September 2007.

== Awards ==
- Dean Paul H. Appleby Award – given for distinguished civil service.

== See also ==
- Israel Jebasingh
