= The Automobile Society India =

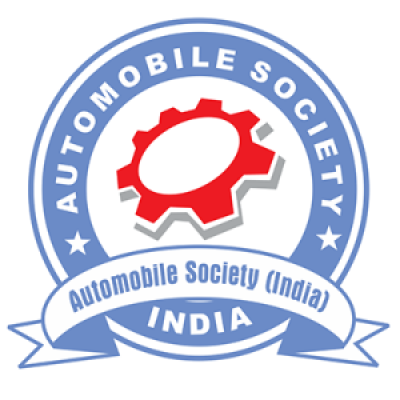
- Abbreviation: ASI
- Formation: 2011
- Type: Automobile Professional Society
- Purpose: Upgrade industry oriented qualification
- Professional title: Technician Engineer
- Headquarters: New Delhi
- Location: Gurgaon
- Region served: India
- Fields: Automobile Engineering
- Members: Fellow, Associate, Organisation, Student
- Chairman: Dileep K Nair
- Secretary General: H.C Bhatia
- Website: www.automobilesociety.ac.in

The Automobile Society India (ASI) started in 2011. ASI began conducting Technician Membership and Senior membership exams through its Institution of Automobile Engineers India. In 2014, the society established a state private technical university in Arunachal Pradesh, the North East Frontier Technical University.

== Membership examination ==
The Automobile Society conducts Technician Membership Examination and Senior Technician membership Examination twice in a year.

== Skill development programmes ==
Automobile Society India is a training partner of NSDC Star Scheme. The society already trained more than 4000 students under this scheme. Now, the society also plans to implement more Skill Development programmes through its Students chapters and University.

== Memberships ==
- Life Member – The Engineering Council Of India
- Member – Assocham
