= IRSE =

IRSE may refer to:

- Indian Railway Service of Engineers, a cadre of the Government of India responsible for managing the Civil Engineering Organisation of the Indian Railways
- Institution of Railway Signal Engineers, a UK-based professional institution for railway signalling and telecommunications

== See also ==
- Indian Railway Service of Signal Engineers (IRSSE)
