= Digvijai Singh =

Indian mechanical engineer (1934–2018)

- Born: 11 December 1934; Uttar Pradesh, India
- Died: 20 July 2018 (aged 83); New Delhi, India
- Education: Allahabad University; IIT Roorkee; University of Wisconsin
- Known for: Studies on dynamics of single track vehicles and tribology
- Awards: 1978 Shanti Swarup Bhatnagar Prize; IMDA Silver Jubilee Award; 1997 IE Mechanical Engineering Design Award; 2003 IE Eminent Engineering Personality; 2007 INAE Jaikrishna Memorial Award; 2007 IIT Roorkee Distinguished Alumnus Award; 2011 TSI Lifetime Achievement Award; 2015 INAE Lifetime Contribution Award
- Scientific career
- Fields: Fluid film lubrication; Tribology
- Workplaces: IIT Roorkee; Central Road Research Institute; All India Council for Technical Education

Digvijai Singh (11 December 1934 – 20 July 2018) was an Indian mechanical engineer and a former vice chancellor of the University of Roorkee before its reconstitution as the Indian Institute of Technology, Roorkee. He was also a former vice chairman of the All India Council for Technical Education (AICTE) and a former director of Central Road Research Institute. He is known for his studies on dynamics of single track vehicles and Fluid film lubrication and was an elected fellow of all the three major Indian science academies viz. Indian National Science Academy, Indian Academy of Sciences, and the National Academy of Sciences, India as well as the Indian National Academy of Engineering. The Council of Scientific and Industrial Research, the apex agency of the Government of India for scientific research, awarded him the Shanti Swarup Bhatnagar Prize for Science and Technology, one of the highest Indian science awards for his contributions to Engineering Sciences in 1978. (Note: Long link - please select award year to see details)

== Biography ==
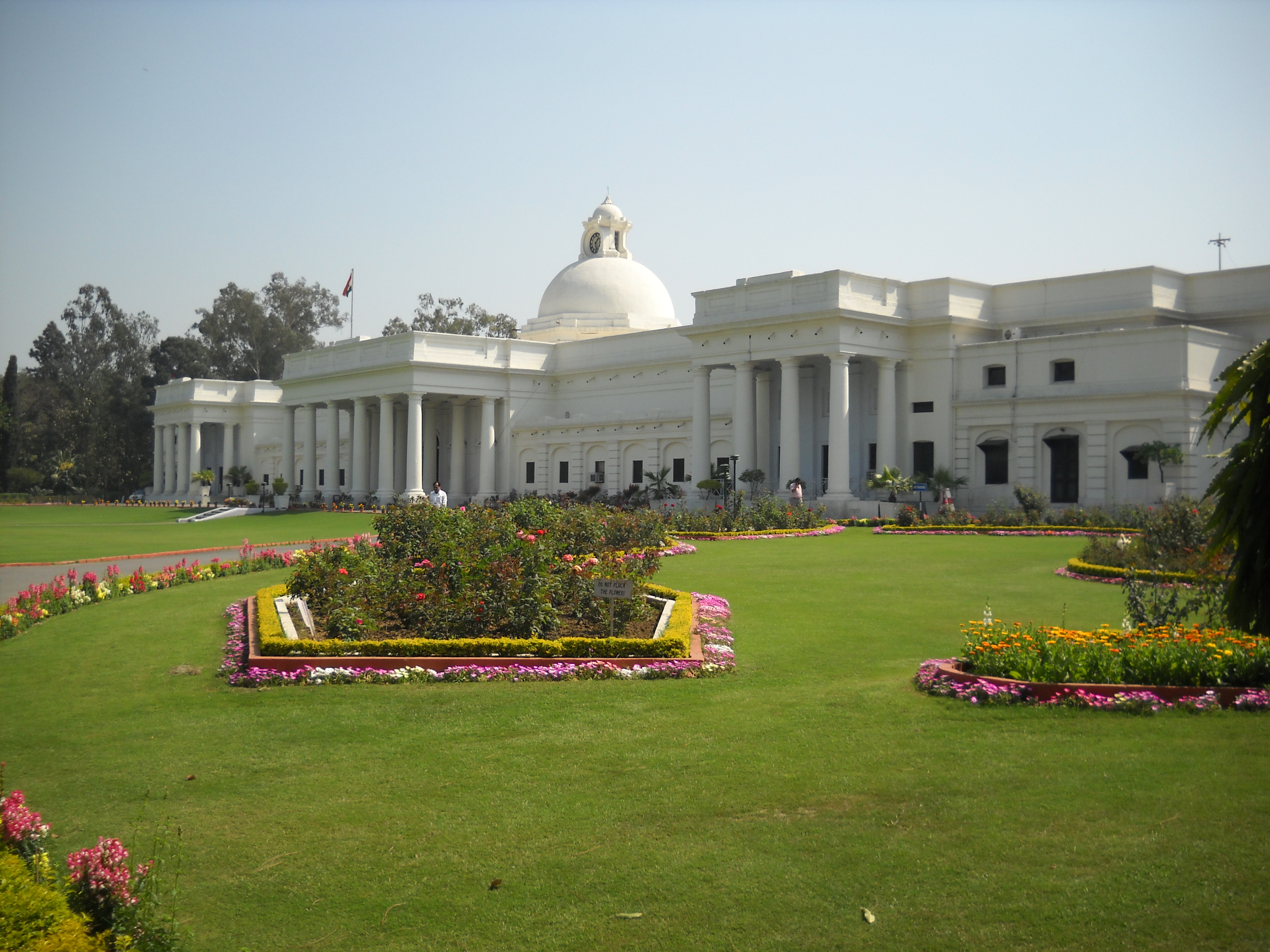
Indian Institute of Technology, Roorkee

Born on 11 December 1934 in the Indian state of Uttar Pradesh, Digvijai Singh graduated in science from Allahabad University in 1953 before graduating in mechanical engineering from University of Roorkee (present-day Indian Institute of Technology, Roorkee) in 1956 and did another bachelor's degree in civil engineering in 1957 at the same institution before joining the university as a lecturer in 1958. Subsequently, he took a sabbatical to move to the US where he completed his master's degree (MS) in 1962 as well as a doctoral degree (PhD) in 1964 at the University of Wisconsin. On his return to India, he resumed his service at University of Roorkee and served as a professor, head of the department of mechanical and industrial engineering, dean of academics and dean of research and industrial liaison till 1990 when he was appointed as the director of the Central Road Research Institute. In 1996, he was made the vice chairman of the All India Council for Technical Education and after a service of 4 years, he became the vice chancellor of Roorkee University in 2000. He oversaw the transition of the university to an Indian Institute of Technology in 2001 and became the director of the IIT. He superannuated from service after handing over the charge to Prem Vrat in December 2001.

== Legacy ==
Singh's early researches during his doctoral studies were funded by Harley-Davidson and were focused on single-track vehicles. Later, on Volkswagen and University of Stuttgart sponsorship, he worked on vehicle dynamics and tyre-pavement interaction and these studies assisted in improving the design of scooters as well as in the indigenization of their manufacturing. His work on welding technology covered weld pool solidification, effects of welding parameters on molten metal transfer, spatter, heat affected zones, changes in crystallographic structures, and solute redistribution and he proposed protocols for the analytical prediction and measurement of residual stresses in and around spot welds. Later in his career, he shifted his focus to tribological studies and contributed to widening the understanding of fluid film lubrication as well as hydrostatic and hydrodynamic lubrication. He also headed a research group engaged in the studies of Pavement management systems. His researches have been documented in 160 peer-reviewed articles; (Note: Please see Selected bibliography section) the online article repository of Indian Academy of Sciences has listed 49 of them. He has also mentored 19 doctoral and several master's scholars in their studies.

Singh sat in the board of directors of the International Road Federation from 1991 to 1994 and, as a founder member of the World Interchange Network, he served as a director of the organization from 1993 to 1996. He was the secretary of the Association of Academies and Societies of Sciences in Asia (AASSA) during 1993–94 and was a member of the Science and Engineering Council of the Department of Science and Technology during 1983–88 and 2000–03. He has been associated with several global and national bodies as a member; governing body of the Technology Information, Forecasting and Assessment Council (1997–99), committees of World Road Association, Central Board of Railway Research (1986–89, 1998-2000), National Accreditation Board for Testing and Calibration laboratories (1998-2000), Committee on Auto-Fuel Policy (2001–02) and Apex Committee on Road Construction and Transportation Equipment (2001–04) are some of them. He was a member of the board of governors of the Engineering Council of India (2002–07) and presided the Tribology Society of India from 1998 to 2000. He was the Lead Person of the Fly Ash Mission (FAM) of the Department of Science and Technology and chaired its Technology Advisory Group during 1993–99. He was also the chairman of programme advisory committee on the National Science and Technology Management System (1997–2003) and served as the national coordinator of the engineering sciences section of the Indo-Russian Integrated long term programme of cooperation in Science and Technology. He was closely associated with the Indian National Academy of Engineering; he has chaired the Engineering Education Forum of the academy and is a member of its Forum on Engineering Interventions for Disaster Mitigation.

== Death ==
Professor D. V. Singh died in New Delhi on 20 July 2018.

== Awards and honors ==
The Council of Scientific and Industrial Research awarded Singh the Shanti Swarup Bhatnagar Prize, one of the highest Indian science awards in 1978. He received two honors from the Institution of Engineers (India); the Mechanical Engineering Design Award in 1997 and the Eminent Engineering Personality Award in 2003. The Indian National Academy of Engineering awarded him the Jaikrishna Memorial Award in 2003; INAE would honor him again in 2015 with the Lifetime Achievement Award. In between, he received the Distinguished Alumnus Award of the Indian Institute of Technology, Roorkee in 2007 and the Lifetime Achievement Award of Tribology Society of India in 2011. He is also a recipient of the Silver Jubilee Award of IMDA.

The Indian Academy of Sciences elected him as a fellow in 1981 and he became an elected fellow of the Indian National Science Academy in 1983 and the National Academy of Sciences, India in 1990. He was also an elected fellow of the Indian National Academy of Engineering. He has held the National Professorship of the University Grants Commission of India and the award orations delivered by him include Dr. Guru Prasad Chatterjee Memorial Lecture of the Indian National Science Academy.

== Selected bibliography ==
- Tayal, S. P.; Sinhasan, R.; Singh, D. V. (1981). "Analysis of hydrodynamic journal bearings with non-Newtonian power law lubricants by the finite element method". Wear. 71 (1): 15–27. doi:10.1016/0043-1648(81)90136-8.
- Jain, S. C.; Sinhasan, R.; Singh, D. V. (1983). "Consideration of viscosity variation in determining the performance characteristics of circular bearings in the laminar and turbulent regimes". Wear. 86 (2): 233–245. doi:10.1016/0043-1648(83)90163-1.
- Soni, S. C.; Sinhasan, R.; Singh, D. V. (1985). "Non-linear analysis of two-lobe bearings in turbulent flow regimes". Wear. 103 (1): 11–27. doi:10.1016/0043-1648(85)90119-X.
- Prabhakaran Nair, K.; Sinhasan, R.; Singh, D. V. (1987). "A study of elastohydrodynamic effects in a three-lobe journal bearing". Tribology International. 20 (3): 125–132. doi:10.1016/0301-679X(87)90042-9.
- Singh, D. V.; Sinhasan, R.; Pal, Roshan (1989). "Performance characteristics of an ungrooved big-end bearing with misalignment". Tribology Transactions. 32 (2): 234–238. doi:10.1080/10402008908981883.

== See also ==
- Hydrostatics
- Fluid dynamics
