= Paul Appleby =

Paul Appleby may refer to:

- Paul H. Appleby (1891–1963), American journalist, public servant, and educator
- Paul Appleby (boxer) (born 1987), Scottish professional boxer
- Paul Appleby (tenor) (born 1983), American opera singer
