= Israel Jebasingh =

Indian Administrative Service Officer

- Education: Venkateswara College of Engineering Anna University, Chennai.
- Occupations: Educator, civil servant, speaker, writer
- Known for: IAS officer
- Website: officersiasacademy.com

Israel Jebasingh is an Indian educator and a former Indian Administrative Service (IAS) officer who served in West Bengal. He is currently the director of the Officers IAS Academy, Chennai.

== Early life ==
After completing schooling from Don Bosco Senior Secondary School, Jebasingh completed a mechanical engineering degree from Sri Venkateswara College of Engineering at Sriperumbudur. In 2004 he qualified the IAS.

== Career ==
Jebasingh began his career as a lecturer at Sriram Engineering College, Chennai. He passed the UPSC Civil Services exam in 2001 and was appointed as an Indian Railway Traffic Service officer. Again in 2004, he passed the exam and was appointed as an assistant collector for the Indian Administrative Service (IAS) in West Bengal. In 2007, he was nominated as an Effective Sub-Collector of India by the Lal Bahadur Shastri National Academy of Administration. During the Naxal crisis in Lalgarh, he is appointed by the Bengal government to resolve the crisis.

In 2010, he resigned from the IAS and worked as a part of the Providing Urban Amenities to Rural Areas Project of Dr. Abdul Kalam. In 2013, he started Officers IAS Academy, a civil services coaching institute to train aspirants. Since 2022 he is also serving as a Madras Christian College Association member. He has also authored a book, The Secret Ingredients to crack the UPSC Civil Examination.
