= Desh Deepak Verma =

Retired Former Indian Administrative Service officer

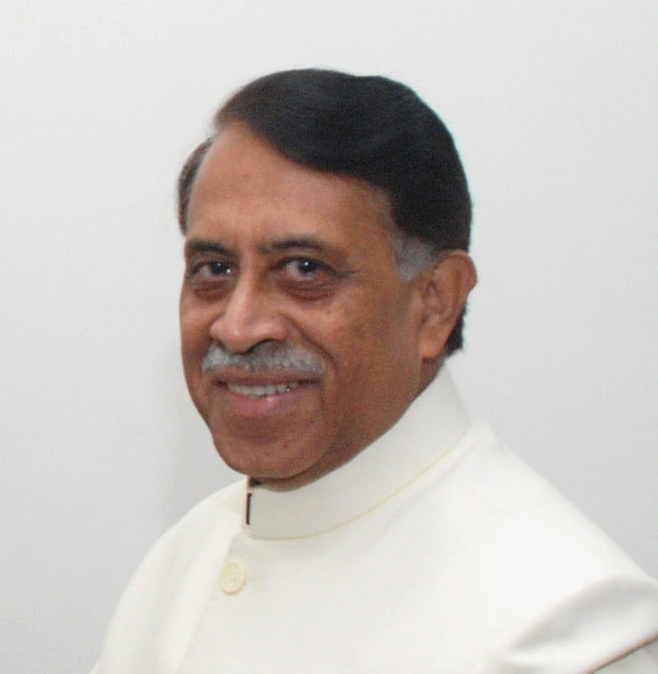

President of AIIMS, Gorakhpur
- Incumbent
- Assumed office 2023

Secretary General of the Rajya Sabha
- In office 1 September 2017 – 31 August 2021
- Preceded by: Shumsher K. Sheriff
- Succeeded by: P.P.K. Ramacharyulu

Director general of Sports Authority of India
- In office 2011–2012
- Succeeded by: Kopal Krishna

Personal details
- Born: 26 June 1953 (age 72) Azamgarh district, Gorakhpur, Uttar Pradesh, India
- Education: D.A.V. Inter College (Intermediate)
- Alma mater: University of Allahabad (MS); University of Wollongong (MBA)
- Occupation: Retired IAS officer

Desh Deepak Verma (born 26 June 1953) is a 1978–batch retired Indian Administrative Service (IAS) officer of Uttar Pradesh cadre. He formerly served as the Secretary General of the Rajya Sabha in Ministry of Parliamentary Affairs from 1 September 2017 to 31 August 2021.

He is former Director general of Sports Authority of India in Ministry of Youth Affairs and Sports from May 2011 to 6 July 2012. He currently serving as the President of AIIMS, Gorakhpur since 2023.

== Personal life ==
Verma was born in 1953 in Verma family and hails from Azamgarh, Gorakhpur, India.

== Education ==
Verma completed her intermediate from D.A.V. Inter College, Baxipur, Gorakhpur, and after MS in Physics from University of Allahabad, they earned degree of MBA in International Business from University of Wollongong in Australia.
