= K. C. Bakhle =

Indian civil servant

Kamalaker Chintaman Bakhle
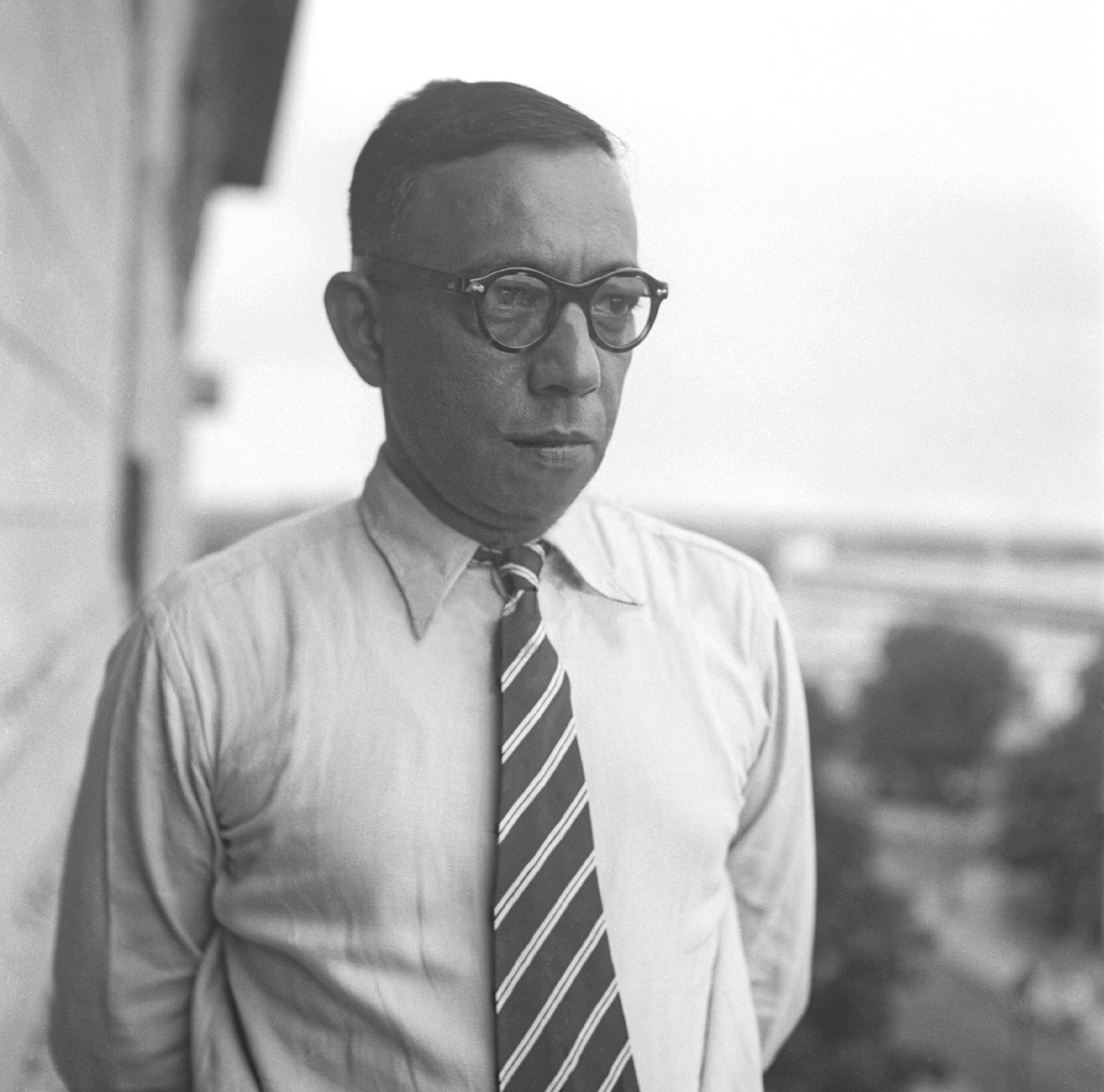
- Born: 17 November 1898; Karachi, Sind Division, Bombay Presidency, British India (now in Sindh, Pakistan)
- Died: 30 July 1975 (aged 76); Poona, Maharashtra, India
- Known for: First Indian Commissioner for the Indian Railways, First Managing Director of Air India.

Kamalaker Chintaman Bakhle (17 November 1898–30 July 1975) was a technocrat and prominent figure in India's transportation sector during the mid-20th century.

== Career ==
Bakhle was educated at Dulwich College and the University of London.

He was the first Indian Commissioner for Indian Railways (a position equivalent to the modern-day Chairperson of the Railway Board). He assumed the role in September 1947 and played a significant role in the reorganization of India's railway zones post-independence. When the then Railways Minister, N. Gopalaswami Ayyangar, proposed restructuring the railways into five zones, Bakhle and his colleagues advocated for a nine-zone system. Despite their recommendations, Ayyangar's five-zone plan was implemented, leading Bakhle to tender his resignation in 1951.

Following his departure from the railways, Bakhle transitioned to the aviation industry. J. R. D. Tata appointed him as the first Managing Director of the newly established Air India. In this capacity, Bakhle contributed to the airline's foundational development and expansion during its formative years. In 1953, he was also appointed Managing Director of Tata Hydro-Electric Agencies Ltd (Now known as Tata Power Company Limited).
