= Suneet Sharma =

Indian Government Official

2nd Chairman & CEO of Railway Board of Indian Railways
- In office 1 January 2021 – 31 December 2021
- Preceded by: Vinod Kumar Yadav
- Succeeded by: Vinay Kumar Tripathi

General Manager of the Eastern Railway
- In office September 2019 – 31 December 2020
- Succeeded by: Manoj Joshi

Personal details
- Born: December 1961 (age 64)
- Education: B.E
- Alma mater: Carnegie Mellon University
- Occupation: Civil servant, Engineer, Bureaucrat

Suneet Sharma is the 2nd Chairman & Chief Executive Officer, Railway Board, Indian Railways and the ex-officio Principal Secretary to the Government of India. Sharma is a Central Government Engineer of IRSME cadre of the 1982 batch (SCRA of 1978 batch).

== Career ==
He was the General Manager of the Eastern Railway from September 2019 to December 2020. Sharma was the general manager of the Modern Coach Factory, Raebareli. He was the also the divisional railway manager of Pune in Central Railway and Chief Mechanical Engineer of Banaras Locomotive Works.

Sharma is credited for introducing various administrative reforms in the Railways, including simplification of the procedure for establishing new benchmarks.

He is credited for increasing the services of the Mumbai Suburban Railway network.

== Early life and education ==
Suneet Sharma is a graduate in Mechanical Engineering from the Indian Railways Institute of Mechanical and Electrical Engineering, Jamalpur. He had joined this institute as a Special Class Railway Apprentice when he was studying at IIT Kanpur.

He received his professional training in Germany and France and also completed an advanced leadership and management course at Carnegie Mellon University.
