= J. K. Mehta =

Indian philosopher and economist (1901–1980)

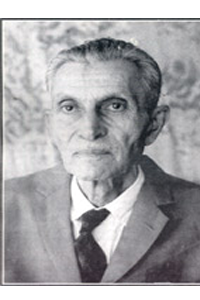
- Born: Jamshed Kaikhusroo Mehta; 14 December 1901; Rajnandgaon, Chhattisgarh, India
- Died: 9 August 1980 (aged 78); Allahabad
- Occupation: Economist

Academic background
- Education: University of Allahabad (PhD)
- Influences: Jevons; Gandhi

Academic work
- School or tradition: Gandhian economics

Jamshed Kaikhusroo Mehta, known professionally as J. K. Mehta (14 December 1901 – 9 August 1980) was an Indian philosopher and economist.

== Life and ideas ==
J. K. Mehta was born to K. M. Mehta in Rajnandgaon in 1901. He completed his graduation from Moir Central College and attended University of Allahabad for post-graduation studies.

In 1968, he became the president of Indian Economic Association. He also served as Head of Department of Economics in Allahabad University and Much inspired by Herbert Stanley Jevons.

Mehta is known for his idea of wantlessness, presenting in 1931 the theory of marginal revenue. He was much inspired by Mahatma Gandhi and spread his theory of economics.

== Main works ==
- Economics of Growth (1st ed., 1964)
- "A Philosophical Interpretation of Economics"
- Rhyme, Rhythm and Truth in Economics
- The Elements of Economics Mathematically Interpreted, (1st ed., 1932)
- Gandhian Thought

== See also ==
- University of Allahabad
- List of University of Allahabad alumni
