= Vinay Kumar Tripathi =

Indian officer and locomotive engineer

Vinay Kumar Tripathi (born 9 June 1962) is retired Indian Railway Service of Electrical Engineers of 1983 batch who served as Chairperson of the Railway Board from January 2022 till December 2022 . Previously, he served as General Manager of North Eastern Railway zone.
