= Jaya Varma Sinha =

Chairwomen of Indian Railways

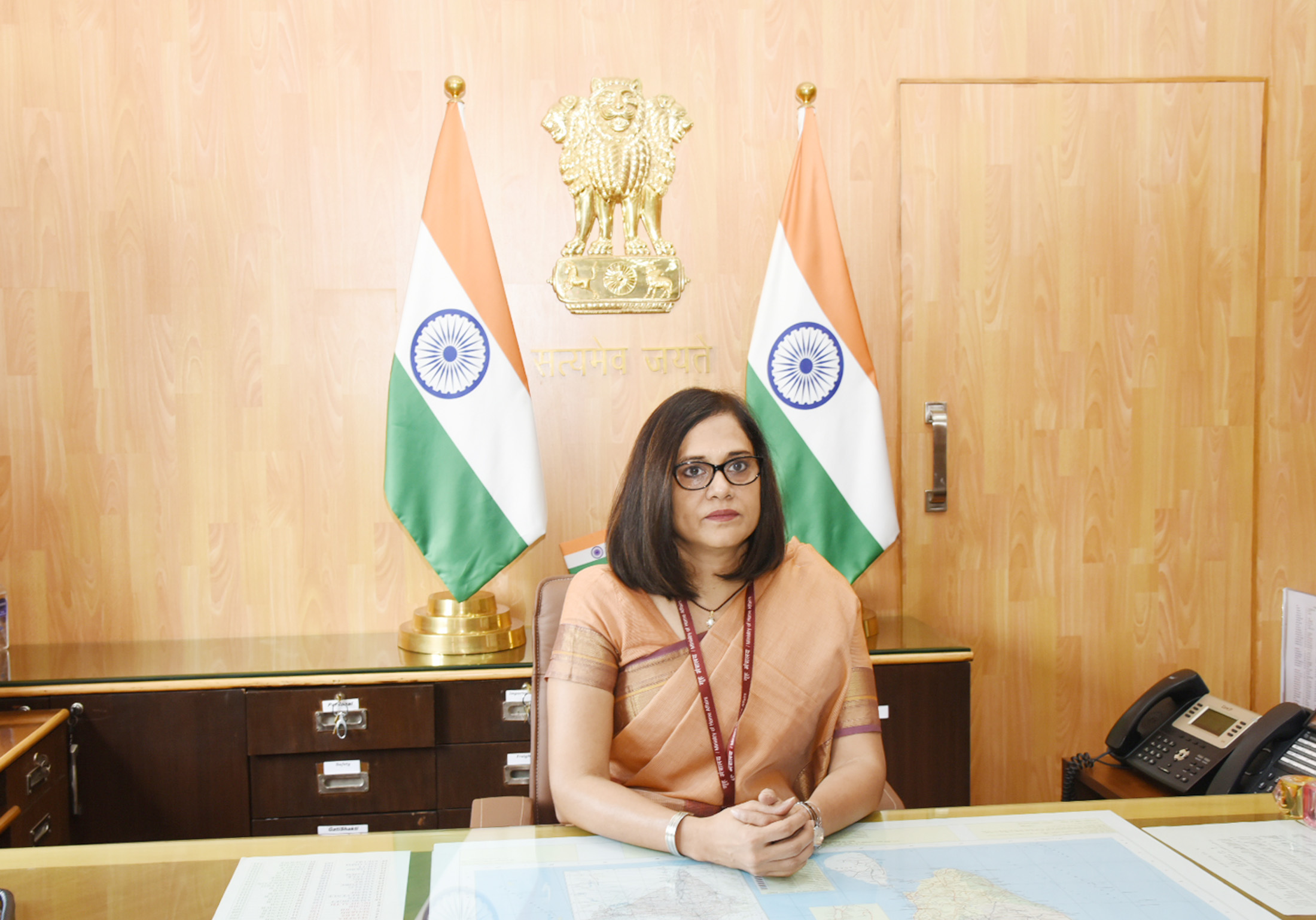
- Photograph of Jaya Varma Sinha on the day of assuming charge as the Chairperson and CEO of the Railway Board, released from Ministry of Railways published by Press Information Bureau

Chairperson and CEO of Railway Board of the Indian Railways
- In office 1 September 2023 – 31 August 2024
- Preceded by: Anil Kumar Lahoti
- Succeeded by: Satish Kumar

Personal details
- Born: 18 September 1963 (age 63)
- Spouse: Neeraj Sinha IPS
- Education: Allahabad University.

Jaya Varma Sinha (born 18 September 1963) is the former Chairperson of the Railway Board (India) of the Indian Railways.

Sinha assumed office on 1 September 2023, becoming the first female Chairperson of the Railway Board in its 118-year history and served there till 31 August 2024. She served as an Information Commissioner in the Central Information Commission from 2025 to 2028.

== Education and career ==
Sinha was educated at St. Mary's Convent Inter College, Prayagraj. She then graduated from Allahabad University. Her previous work experience includes a four-year tenure as Railway Advisor in the Indian High Commission in Dhaka, Bangladesh.

Sinha belongs to the 1988 batch of Indian Railway Traffic Service. She became a Member (Operations & Business Development), Railway Board in February 2023. She was an Additional Member (Traffic) before this appointment. She has also served as Divisional Railway Manager in the Sealdah division.

== 2023 Odisha train collision ==
Sinha was the public face of Indian Railways during the multi-train collision in Odisha in June 2023 which led to the deaths of 275 people.
