= Rape and murder of Nirmala Panta =

2018 crime in Nepal

Nirmala Panta, a 13-year-old girl from Kanchanpur, Nepal, was found raped and murdered in a sugarcane field near her home on 27 July 2018, after she had gone missing the day before. The news of the incident went viral on social media and received widespread condemnation. In the subsequent days and months, various justice campaigns and mass protests were organised throughout the country to put pressure on the government and the police. The first investigation carried out by the local police and a team from the Crime Investigation Bureau (CIB) drew widespread criticism for its methods and conduct.

== Incident ==
Nirmala Panta was a ninth-grade student from Ward 2 of Bhimdatta. On 26 July 2018, she left her home to study at her friend Roshani Bam's house. República reported that she went to Bam's house, 1.5 kilometres (0.93 mi) from her own, at around 11 a.m. She left at around 3 p.m. but did not return home. Panta's family attempted to file a missing person's complaint at the local police station but were instructed to return the next morning. On 27 July, Panta's dead body was found naked in a waterlogged sugarcane field about 500 metres (1,600 ft) from Bam's house in Nimbukheda, Ward 18 of Bhimdattanagar.

== Investigation ==
Panta's body was found after her bicycle was spotted in the sugarcane field by the side of the road. Based on preliminary investigation, the local police stated that she was murdered after being raped. The CIB (Crime Investigation Bureau) team led by Deputy Superintendent of Police (DSP) Angur G.C. began the investigation upon reaching Kanchanpur, four days after the incident.

Kanchanpur Police and the CIB team named a 41-year-old local man, who had previously served a nine-year jail sentence for the murder of his brother-in-law, as the suspect. Police claimed that he had confessed to the crime multiple times under interrogation. He was released on 12 September after his DNA did not match samples from the victim. Locals, including Panta's family, launched violent protests alleging that he was innocent and maliciously framed by the police to protect the real culprits.

After protestors called for their arrests, Bam and her sister were arrested on 23 August. They were released after police consulted with the District Attorney's Office, citing a lack of evidence. Bam was released under the condition that she should present herself to the police upon demand while her sister was released under bail of Rs 30,000.

Beginning on 23 August, Hari Prasad Mainali, Director General of Department of Prison Management, led a Nepalese government committee of to investigate the incident. Kanchanpur Police Chief, Superintendent of Police (SP) Dilli Raj Bista and Chief District Officer (CDO) Kumar Bahadur Khadka were summoned to Kathmandu, and were replaced by new officials. The incident also resulted in the suspension of DSPs Gyan Bahadur Sethi and Angur GC, Inspectors Ekendra Khadka and Jagadish Bhatta, and Assistant Sub-inspector (ASI) Ram Singh Dhami, by the Ministry of Home Affairs.

On 17 September, nine police officials were interrogated over their involvement in the investigation of the case, which included SP Dilli Raj Bista. However, Birendra K.C. quit the Home Ministry investigation panel citing threats from the group trying to undermine the investigation. Per the spokesperson of Nepal Police, SSP Shailesh Thapa Kshetri, DNA samples from SP Bista, his son, and the nephew of the mayor of Bhimdatta had been taken, together with the vaginal swab of the victim, for further investigation, but none of them matched.

On 17 September, a new investigative committee was set up by the Nepal Police under DIG (Deputy Inspector General of Police) Dhiru Basnyat to replace the former investigation committee led by SSP Uttam Subedi. On the same day, Prime Minister KP Sharma Oli asserted that the local police had derailed the investigation. He speculated that either the police had faked the investigation or had committed mistakes in the investigation. The Panta family travelled 35 hours by bus to Kathmandu to draw the attention of the central government to the case. Oli assured the family that the perpetrator would be prosecuted and punished irrespective of his money, power, post, or influences.

On 18 September, the Kanchanpur police chief SP Kuber Kathayat said that there was no concrete evidence, and that the investigation was ongoing. The government had earlier set up an investigative panel due to the destruction of evidence by the local investigating police after the discovery of the body of the victim. DIG Dhiru Basnyat, who was appointed as the leading officer to a nine-member probe committee formed on 16 September 2018, for the new investigation, stated that the investigation would be begun anew.

The Central Investigation Bureau, in December 2018, arrested one of Panta's neighbours, from Kathmandu. One of his friends was also called to the bureau from Kanchanpur for interrogation. According to police sources, both Inspector General of Police Sarbendra Khanal and chief of the bureau Deputy Inspector General Niraj Bahadur Shahi personally interrogated both men. According to the police, they confessed to Panta's rape and murder. However, neither of their DNAs matched the sample collected from Panta's vaginal swab, and they were both released. They have since accused the police of torturing them, a charge the police has denied.

=== DNA tests ===
According to a report by the National Human Rights Commission, there were serious lapses in DNA collection, due to which a correct result could not be obtained. The DNA sample was collected into a test tube from three layers of a vaginal swab. The commission report says that the extraction provided an insufficient sample of the DNA, which could also have been damaged. The report also found flaws in the scientific method applied to the DNA test. The commission recommended using methods of investigation other than DNA testing. Another technical committee to investigate DNA led by Jiwan Rijal also concluded that the said male component of sample taken from victim's body might be contaminated and may not be of the perpetrator. It also questioned the validity of the lab's report that sperm was found in the sample.

=== Suspension and Reinstatement of Police Officers ===
In December 2018, following the advice of civil society, Nirmala Panta's mother Durga Devi filed an FIR against the eight police officials, accusing them of destroying evidence in the case. In March 2019, a case was logged by the Office of District Attorney at Kanchanpur District Court against those officers for their involvement in torture to suspect Dilip Bista and destruction of evidence in connection with Nirmala Pant rape and murder case.

However, Nirmala's mother Durga Devi Pant later applied to revoke the FIR. She revealed that she didn't know about the names kept in the FIR. Despite the application, six of the eight police personnel were immediately taken into custody and produced before the court. A single bench of Judge Rajendra Kumar Acharya ordered the authorities to release six police officials on various bail amounts. Superintendent of Police (SP) Dilli Raj Bista surrendered himself later at the Kanchanpur District Court, and the court granted him bail on 1.5 million rupees. Deputy Superintendent of Police (DSP) of the Central Investigation Bureau (CIB) Angur GC also surrendered later to the court. The court granted bail on an amount of 900,000 rupees. Nirmala's father Yagyaraj Panta welcomed the order. In July 2020, a single bench of Judge Gopal Prasad Bastola acquitted the eight police officials.

The seven officers who were suspended joined the duty; however, Dilliraj Bista was reinstated later as he was fired from the job. Following the verdict, Nirmala's mother Durga Devi spoke to media that she was happy to hear that the police officers were acquitted.

=== Role of Khem Bhandari ===
Khem Bhandari, the publisher and chief editor of local newspaper 'Manaskhanda', was able to mobilize local reporters to frame the Nirmala case as per his own liking. His reporting fueled public protests and resulted in a kind of social media trial against Bam sisters (Roshani and Babita Bam), Dilliraj's son Ayush and others. He also accused Nirmala's mother Durga Devi of ‘selling justice for her daughter for money’. On his Facebook, he wrote that Durga took 10 million rupees and a bigha of land to frame Dilip Bista as the criminal. It was later known that he is a relative of the prime accused Dilip Singh Bista. Kanchanpur District Bar Association lodged a case against him accusing him of defamation of the court and of interfering with the court's procedure. He was arrested and court convicted him for defamation and for ‘sensationalizing’ the rape and murder and ‘publishing twisted news’. He was charged with a one-hour jail term and a fine of Rupee 1 calling it to be "heinous punishment".

==== Subsequent legal developments ====
On 2 July 2026, Khem Bhandari was arrested by the Kanchanpur District Police to enforce the Mahendranagar bench of the Dipayal High Court's verdict upholding his conviction in a defamation case related to the Nirmala Panta case. The defamation suit had been filed by Kiran Bista, who alleged that Bhandari had defamed him through reports published in the Manaskhanda daily and posts on social media. The Kanchanpur District Court convicted Bhandari on 15 May 2025, sentencing him to one month and seven days' imprisonment, imposing a fine of Rs. 12,100, and ordering him to pay Rs. 100,000 in compensation. Bhandari appealed the verdict, but on 5 April 2026 the Mahendranagar bench of the Dipayal High Court upheld the district court's decision. Police stated that Bhandari was taken into custody to execute the court's verdict and was produced before the Kanchanpur District Court after undergoing a medical examination.

== Reaction and protests ==
Panta's murder sparked public outrage on social media and public demonstrations. In a meeting with the victim's parents and Sudurpashchim Province lawmakers, prime minister Oli gave assurances that justice would be delivered. During public demonstrations in Bhimdattanagar, one boy died by police fire in clashes with police.

=== Public protests ===
- On Friday evening, 27 July 2018, the students of the Nepal Student Union demonstrated and shut down the Bazaar area of Bhimdatta, which resulted in a clash with security personnel.
- On Saturday, 28 July 2018, the victim's family, together with local civilians, a women's rights organization, and sister organizations of the opposition party Nepali Congress, protested the failure of police to find the culprits and demanded security be established at the incident site. On Saturday, the victim's family and relatives staged demonstrations at the Mahakali Zonal Hospital, the Bazaar Area, and the municipal corporation.
- On 23 August 2018, locals in Kanchanpur staged demonstrations, shut down the market, and burned tyres to protest the failure of police to find the real culprits. Demonstrations had been ongoing in Bhimdatta, Bhansi, Suda, Lalpur, Sisaiya, Daiji, Champhapur and adjacent areas since the incident.
- On 15 September 2018, a mass rally was organized at Maitighar Mandala, Kathmandu, with the slogan of Justice for Nirmala. The rally converged on a corner assembly at New Baneshwor.
- On Tuesday, 18 September 2018, the Nepali Congress organized a rally at Mahendranagar, which was joined by Panta's parents, demanding the identification and punishment of the perpetrator of the incident. They submitted a memorandum of demand to the Chief District Officer of Kanchanpur, Taranath Adhikari.
- On the same day, students of the Janajyoti Multiple Campus of Sarlahi district organized a rally at Lalbandi, Sarlahi, where hundreds of students, civil society leaders, political leaders, and women's rights activists demanded justice for the victim.
- On 30 October 2018, family, friends, relatives and human rights activists led a rally in Mahendranagar demanding justice for the victim and punitive actions against SP Dilli Raj Bista and Inspector Jagadish Prasad Bhatta.
