= B. N. Banerjee =

Indian lawyer and parliamentarian

B. N. Banerjee (1916–2002) was a Bengali speaking Indian lawyer and parliamentarian.

== Education ==
After graduating from the Scottish Church College, he studied law and earned his LL.B, and subsequently his LL.M degrees from the University of Calcutta.

== Career ==
He served as the Secretary General of the Rajya Sabha from 1963 to 1976. He was nominated as a member of the Rajya Sabha in 1976 where he served till 1982.
