= Arunendra Kumar =

Indian Railway Service officer (born 1954)

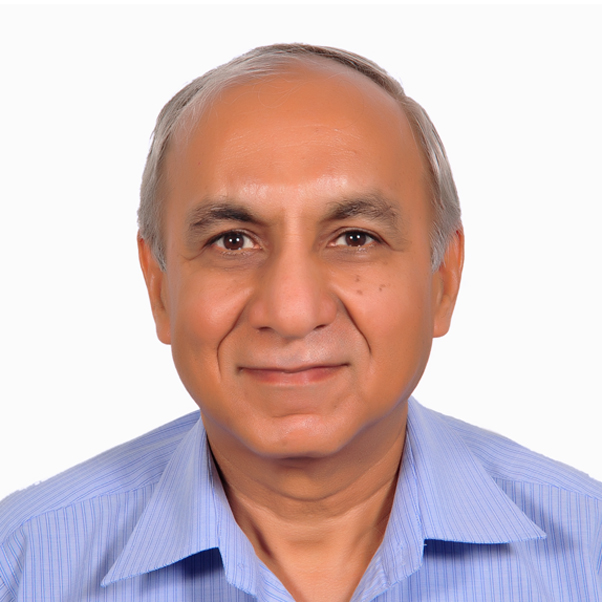

Chairman, Railway Board (CRB)
- In office 30 June 2013. – 31 December 2014
- Preceded by: Vinay Mittal
- Succeeded by: A.K. Mittal

Personal details
- Born: 13 December 1954 (age 70); Lucknow, Uttar Pradesh, India
- Occupation: Civil servant (Indian Railway Service of Mechanical Engineers)

Arunendra Kumar (born 13 December 1954) is an Indian Railway Service of Mechanical Engineers officer. He served as Chairman of Indian Railways from 2013 to 2014, as Member Mechanical in 2013, and as General Manager of South East Central Railways in 2011–13

== Career in Indian Railways ==
Kumar is an officer belonging to 1976 batch of Indian Railway Service of Mechanical Engineers (IRSME). He superannuated from Indian Railways as Chairman of Indian Railways in 2014, after 38 years of service from 1976 to 2014. During his tenure, he worked on initiatives such as laying foundation of high speed trains in India, introduction of 100% FDI, development of Eastern and Western dedicated freight corridors, and improving Railway finances by speeding up Railway reforms including private investment. In his capacity as the Chairman of the Railway Board, Kumar functioned as the Ex-Officio Chairman of the Dedicated Freight Corridor Corporation of India.

Prior to being Chairman of the Railway Board, Kumar held the following notable positions:

- Member Mechanical (MM), responsible for the Indian Railway Service of Mechanical Engineers function across India. As part of this, he oversaw day-to-day train operations, workshops, and production units for Indian Railways, nationwide
- General Manager, South East Central Railway zone (SECR), responsible for the performance of the SECR Railway zone. As part of this, he oversaw the operations, financials, and legal aspects of SECR zone
- Divisional Railway Manager, Mumbai, responsible for handling the heavy suburban and freight train operations in Mumbai

== Family ==
Arunendra Kumar has 3 children called Sonika Gupta, Priyanka Kumar and Anuj Kumar. His wife's name is Kanta Kumar.
