= K. C. Jena =

Indian Civil servant

Kalyan kumar Jena (born 1949) was the Chairman of the Indian Railway Board, appointed 1 August 2007 – 2009. On his appointment, he also assumed the chairmanship of the International Union of Railways, completing the term of Jai Prakash Batra, the former chairman of the Indian Railway Board.

== Education ==
Jena is a graduate from Indian Institute of Technology Kanpur and joined the Indian Railways Traffic service in 1971. He has held various responsibilities in all domains of Indian Railways, the fourth largest railway system in the world. Prior to his appointment as chairman, Jena was member (Staff) of the board.
