= Sri Venkateswara College of Engineering =

Institution in Tamil Nadu, India

(SVCE) Sri Venkateswara College of Engineering (Autonomous, and Accredited by NAAC A+ Grade)
- Motto: Center of Excellence
- Type: Private, Autonomous
- Established: 1985; 41 years ago
- Affiliations: Anna University, Chennai
- Chairperson: Dr A. C. Muthiah
- Principal: Prof Dr.E.N Ganesh
- Dean: 4
- Faculty: 286
- Administrative staff: 180
- Students: 3500
- Undergraduates: 3450
- Postgraduates: 50
- Location: Chennai, Tamil Nadu, India; 12°59′12″N 79°58′19″E
- Campus: Sriperumbudur, 95 acres (0.4 km^{2})
- Website: www.svce.ac.in

Sri Venkateswara College of Engineering (SVCE) is an institute in Tamil Nadu, at Pennalur, Sriperumbudur near Chennai. SVCE was founded in 1985. The college was established by the Southern Petrochemical Industries Corporation (SPIC) group. SVCE is among the top engineering colleges of Anna University in Tamil Nadu and a Tier-II institution among self-financing colleges.

== History ==
Inauguration of the old college campus, 8 April 1985

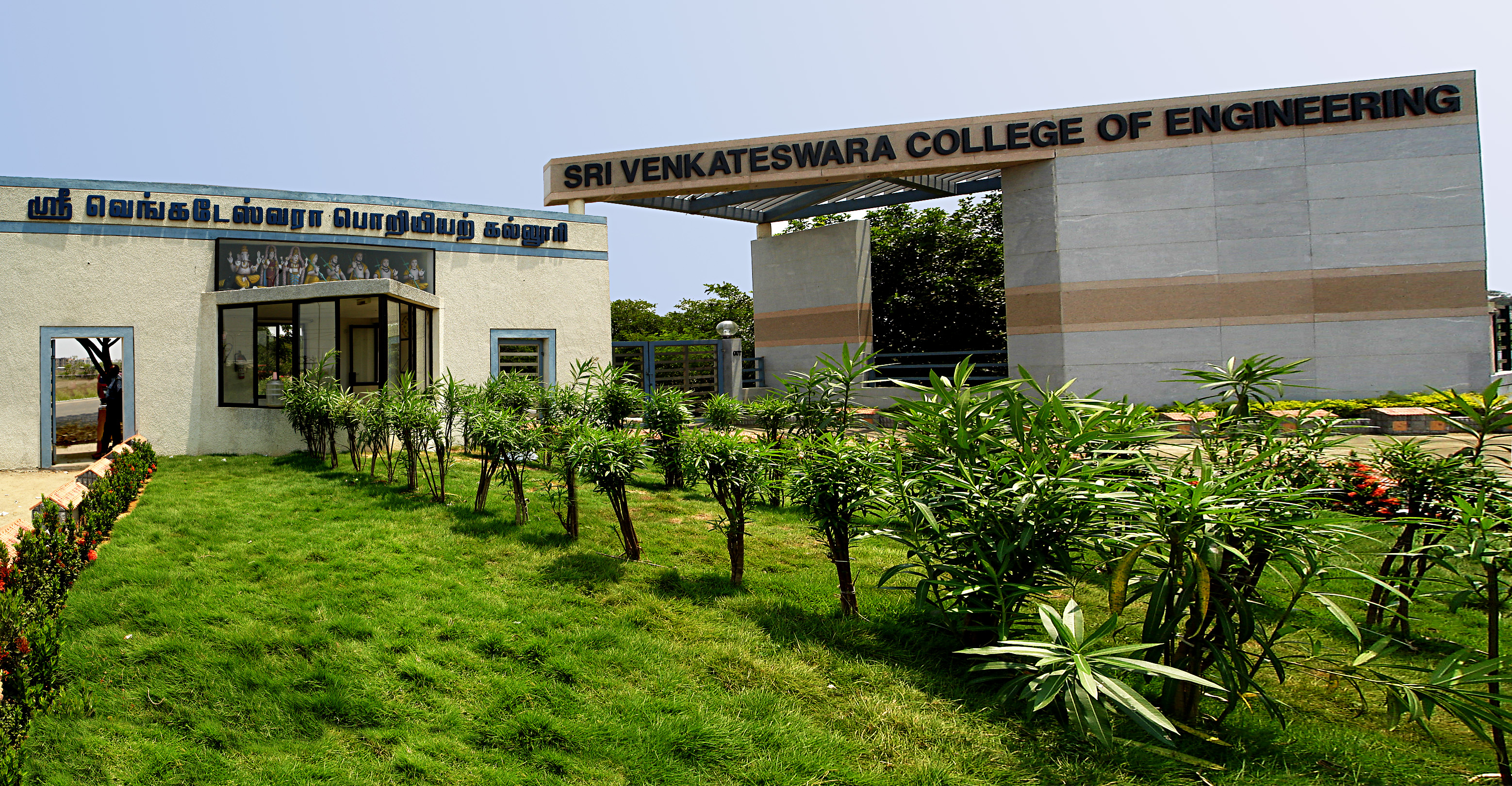
The entrance to the college

In November 1985, the college was founded and granted permission by Sri Venkateswara Educational and Health Trust to conduct engineering courses in Mechanical Engineering, Electronics and Communication Engineering, and Computer Science and Engineering, which were awarded by the University of Madras.

The college complex at Nazarathpet (near Poonamallee) was inaugurated on 8 April 1985 by the former Governor of Tamil Nadu.

In 1991, the college shifted into its new campus at Pennalur, near the town of Sriperumbudur. Sri Venkateswara College of Engineering received approval from the All India Council for Technical Education the same year. Courses in Electrical & Electronics engineering and Chemical Engineering were started in 1994.

SVCE celebrated its decennial in March 1995 in the presence of former Minister of State for Commerce, Government of India. In 1996 it began a course in Information technology and became the first college in the country to do so. The college obtained an ISO 21001:2018 certification in 2024. SVCE obtained autonomy from UGC in 2016.

== Rankings ==
University and college rankings

Engineering – India
- NIRF (2023): 151-200

The National Institutional Ranking Framework (NIRF) ranked it in the 151-200 band among engineering colleges in 2023.

It also has NAAC grade A+.The institution has autonomous status up to 2032.

== Library ==
SVCE has 1,338-square-metre (14,400 sq ft) library spanning three floors covering major fields of science and engineering, a conference room, study space and seating capacity of over 200. The library is air-conditioned and has conferencing, multimedia, internet, reprography facilities, a CD-ROM collection and a book bank for students.

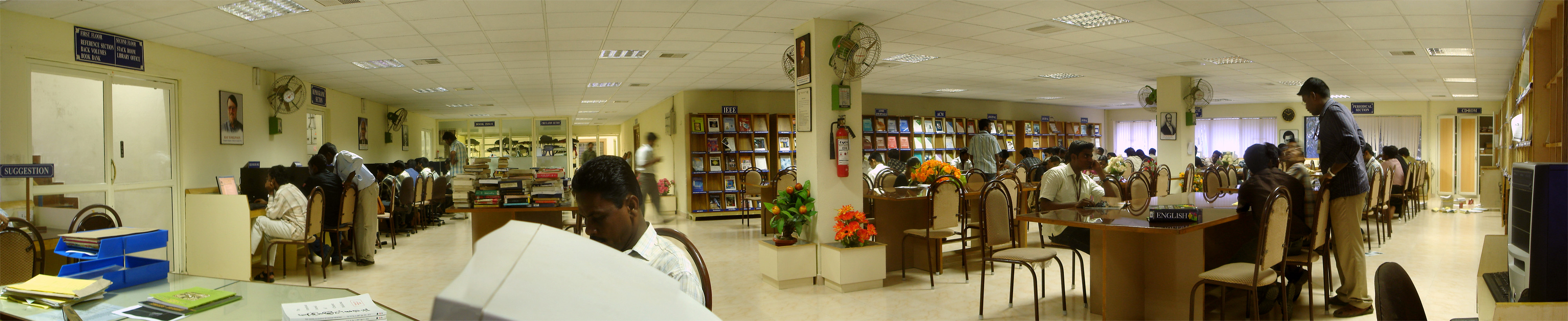
The central library

The college subscribes to most major technical journals which includes those by the IEEE, ACM and ASME. Over 1,04,694 volumes and 1725 CDs are available and around 400 print and online journals are subscribed.

Apart from the central library, all departments maintain their own libraries. SVCE is an institutional member of The British Council Library, IIT Madras, American Council Library, DELNET and MALIBNET. The library uses multimedia computers with internet connectivity, computer-based training, CDs, e-books and e-journals to promote e-learning.

A new department of Information Management System (IMS) was started in 2010.

== Sports infrastructure ==
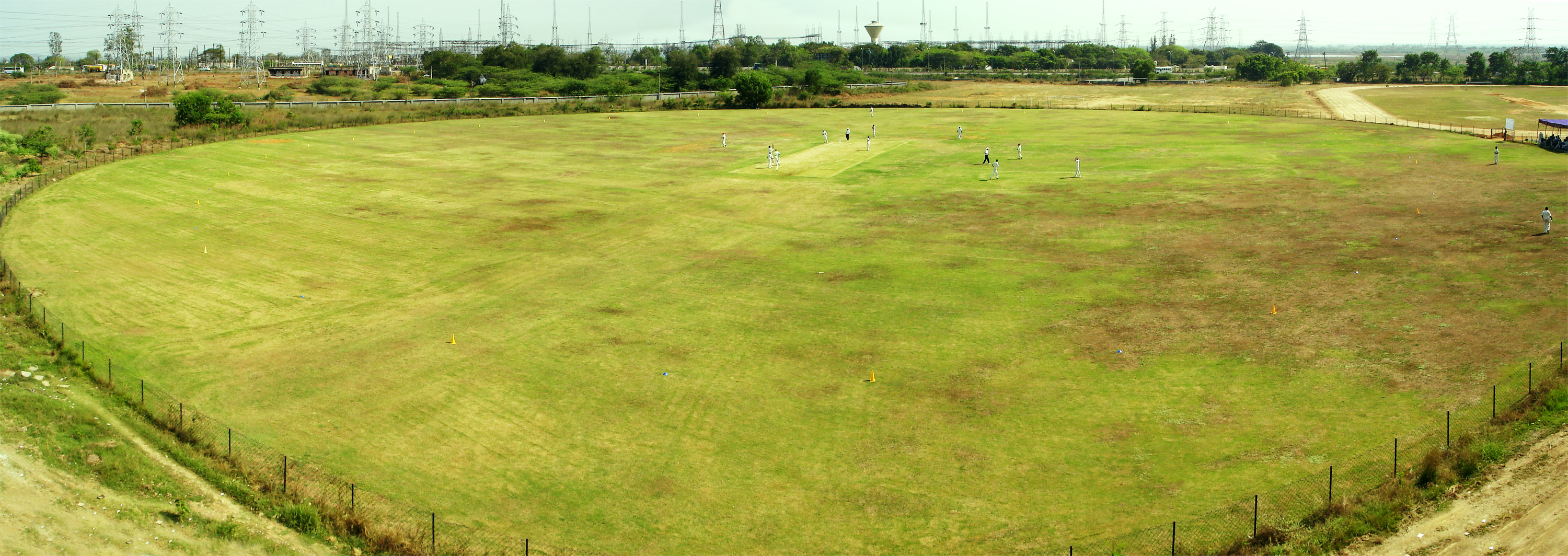
The cricket ground

The 15 acres (653,400.0 sq ft) facility has a swimming pool, synthetic and clay tennis courts, turf cricket ground, basketball, football grounds, badminton, volleyball courts, and a 400-meter track.

350-square-metre (3,800 sq ft) is dedicated to a table tennis hall, gymnasium, and carom and chess rooms.

The college conducts inter-college tournaments in basketball, volleyball, cricket and ball badminton.

== Research ==
Dr. KR. Santha, Professor, Vice Principal & Dean - Research is coordinating the research activities in Sri Venkateswara College of Engineering (SVCE).

The following Eleven departments are recognised as collaborative research centres by Anna University to conduct PhD:

- Electrical and Electronics Engineering
- Mechanical Engineering (iii) Chemical Engineering
- Mathematics
- Physics
- Chemistry
- Information Technology
- Biotechnology
- Computer Science and Engineering
- Electronics and Communication Engineering
- Civil Engineering

R&D is aided by a technology innovation center (TIC), which houses SPIC's research centre. TIC houses an interdisciplinary centre for nanotechnology to carry out research. The centre supported by FIST.

The management of SVCE sanctioned Rs.3,00,000 every year to carry out innovative projects for final year UG (2 Lakhs) and PG (one Lakh) students.

The SVCE students' research day (SVCE Innovates) is conducted in third week of March every year to motivate and nurture innovative ideas among Students.

Faculty research day is also conducted every year in the third week of April to share their research ideas among faculty and research scholars.

More than 79 members of the faculty have received recognised supervisors status from Anna University to guide research scholars. More than 152 faculty members with PhD qualification. More than 207 research scholars, including 30 full time research scholars, are pursuing PhD in SVCE research centers. As of September 2023, 157 scholars (FT/PT (external)/PT (internal)) have completed their PhD through SVCE research centers. Eighteen faculty completed PhD from SVCE and 25 members of faculty of SVCE completed PhD from Anna University/other affiliated colleges of Anna University.

Ten faculty completed PhD from other University (IITM, Bharathiar University, MSU, JNTU)

Management of SVCE encourages the members of the faculty to do research and give incentives for their research output:

- Performance based research incentive for PhD qualified faculty.
- Incentive for research publications in a reputed National/ International Journals.
- The Management of SVCE is also giving additional incentive 2% of the amount received through funded projects. The same sanctioned after the successful completion of funded projects received from external agencies.
- Special incentive for the consistent performer in research. This is based on the average score earned by the faculty for the three consecutive Academic years. Faculty scored above 50 are eligible to receive 25% from their basic pay. If the score is 40 and above then they are eligible to receive 15% of Incentive from their basic pay. If the score is 30 and above then they are eligible to receive 10% Incentive.

=== Projects ===
Latest externally funded projects: 26.

- The Department of Electronics and Communication Engineering (Dr P Jothilakshmi, Professor-PI), received a research grant of Rs.4.1 Lakhs from Tamil Nadu State Council for Science and Technology (TNSCST) for the period of two years (2020-2022)
- The Department of Applied Mathematics (Dr R MUTHUCUMARASWAMY, Dean(Research) Professor and Head-PI)received a research grant of Rs.17.79 Lakhs from National Board of Higher Mathematics (DAE-NBHM) under JRF scheme for the period of three years (2021-2024).
- The Department of Biotechnology (Dr V Sumitha, Associate Professor and HOD incharge, SVCE and Dr Gugan Jayaraman, Professor, IITM), received a grant of Rs.18.30 Lakhs from DST-SERB under the scheme Teacher Associateship for Research Excellence (TARE) for the period of three years (2021-2024).
- The Department of Information Technology (Dr C Yaasuwanth, Associate Professor-PI), received a research grant of Rs.17.27 Lakhs from ISRO under RESPOND JRF scheme for the period of three years (2021-2024).
- The Department of Biotechnology (Dr P K Praveen Kumar, Associate Professor and Dr Michael Gromiha, Professor, IITM ) received a grant of Rs 18.30 lakhs from SERB-DST under the scheme Teacher Associateship for Research Excellence (TARE) for the period of three years (2021-2024).
- The Department of Civil Engineering (Dr R Kumutha, Professor and Head), received a grant of Rs 18.30 lakhs from SERB-DST under the scheme Teacher Associateship for Research Excellence (TARE) for the period of three years (2022-2025).
- The Department of Electrical and Electronics Engineering (Dr R Kannadasan, Assistant Professor(PI)), received a grant of Rs. 54 Lakhs from SERB under the Scheme EEQ for his project proposal titled "MULTI-LAYER-MULTI-PURPOSE SMART WASTE MANAGEMENT SYSTEM USING INTERNET OF THINGS (IoT)" (2022-2024)
- The Department of Applied Mathematics (MUTHUCUMARASWAMY, Dean(Research) Professor and Head-PI and Dr A Suba, Assistant Professor)received a research grant of Rs.2.88 Lakhs from Defence Research Developmental Organization (DRDO) under ERIP/IPR scheme for the period of three years (2023-2025).
- Six TNSCST projects are bagged by SVCE under final year Students Project Scheme for the academic year 2022–2023.
- Three AIChE projects are bagged by SVCE under final year students project scheme for the Academic year 2022-2023

=== Grants ===
==== Intramural Research Grant (IRG) ====
SVCE funding in-house research projects to motivate and encourage young faculty into research. The Management announced and sanctioned Rs.8 Lakhs for eight Departments each Rs.1 Lakh for the period of two years. Eight grants (APC/AUT/BIO/CHE/ECE/EEE/INT/MEC) are sanctioned by SVCE in the Academic years 2022-2023 and 2023–2024.

==== SVCE Research fellowship ====
This Fellowship for full time research scholars pursuing PhD in research Centres of SVCE. The Management of SVCE sanctioned research fellowships for every year. For the first two years Rs.18000/- fellowship per month and third year the fellowship is Rs.20,000/-. As on date seven research scholars are benefited in this scheme.

==== Intramural research grant for collaborative research with IITM ====
The Management was sanctioned Rs.70,000 for intramural research grant to Mr V R Vignesh, final year BTech Chemical Engineering student for his collaborative research with IITM. Management approved full sponsorship for presenting his research papers in USA. He got admit in PhD program with full financial assistance from University of Illinois, USA.

=== Research Centre of Excellence ===
The following five research centres are established in SVCE.

- Interdisciplinary Centre for Nanotechnology
- Welding Research Cell
- 3D printing
- Cybersecurity and Forensic Science
- Centre for Cloud Computing

== iGEM participation ==
Students from the department of biotechnology have formed teams and participated in the international Genetically Engineered Machines competition in 2015 and 2016, being the only Anna University affiliated college to do so. They were placed in the bronze medal category in 2015 and silver medal category in 2016. In 2015, they worked on finding alternatives to antibiotics and in 2016 worked on developing a system to prolong the shelf life of milk without refrigeration.

== Entrepreneurship Development Cell ==
The Entrepreneurship Development Cell was formed in 1996 and has organized awareness camps to motivate students to become entrepreneurs. An Entrepreneurship Promotion and Incubation Center (EPIC) has been formed with support from Entrepreneurship Development Institute and MSME to incubate start-up companies with innovative ideas.

ally to be suitable to the requirements of the society. The campus is large with sprawling greenery and individual blocks for departments and research and development centres.

The cafeteria functions throughout the day and serves snacks, drinks and packed food items alongside South and North Indian breakfast and lunch choices. The Pennalurish Pupps and Birinji are of Top notch taste and the recipe is maintained for decades without any anomaly.

For an undergraduates at SVCE, there are many subject-based activities, lectures and workshops happening in between exams to keep the students engaged. The college has memorandum of understanding signed with industries and companies, including multinational giants, to enable research options and internship opportunities for professional development.

== Housing ==
The SVCE housing comprises two clusters of eight blocks for men and three blocks for women. For the Marine Engineering students, it is mandatory to live in the hostels. A total of around 380 women and 850 men can stay in the hostel. Hostel area has indoor games, TV, WiFi and laundromats.

== Notable alumni ==
- Dr. V. Kamakoti (CSE 1985-1989) Director of the Indian Institute of Technology Madras (IIT Madras), is a Professor in the Department of Computer Science and Engineering, IIT Madras, Chennai, Tamil Nadu, India. His areas of specialization include Secure Systems Engineering, Computer Architecture, and Computer-Aided Design (CAD) for VLSI Design Systems. In recognition of his distinguished contributions to academia and technology, Dr. V. Kamakoti was conferred with the Padma Shri award in 2026.
- Dr. Vijaykrishnan Narayanan (1989-1993) is the A. Robert Noll Chair Professor of Computer Science and Engineering and Electrical Engineering, Evan Pugh University Professor and the Associate Dean for Innovation at The Pennsylvania State University. He also serves as the director of the Penn State Center for Artificial Intelligence Foundations and Engineering Systems, and as the interim director of limited submission for the University's Office of the Senior Vice President of Research.
