= Vinod Kumar Yadav =

Former Chairman and CEO of Indian Railways

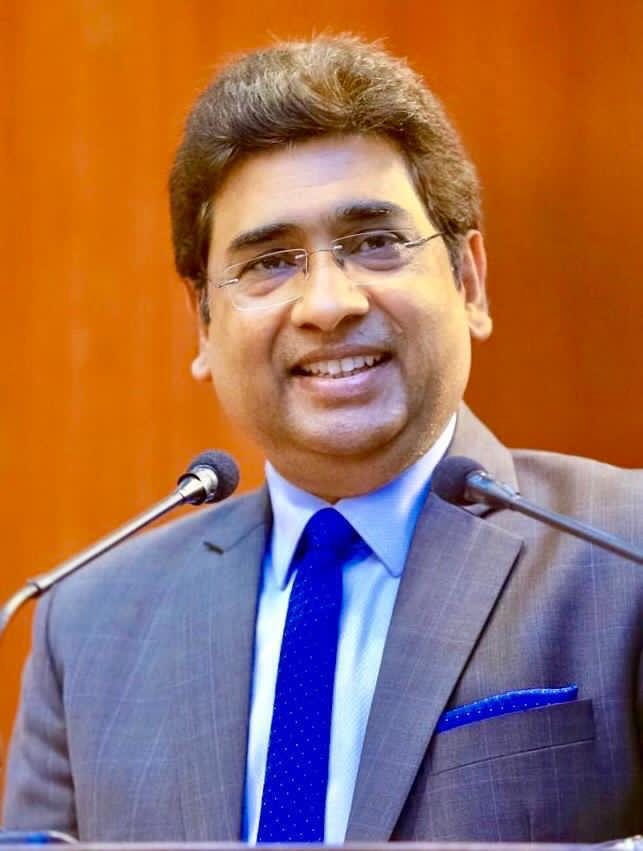

1st Chairman and CEO of Railway Board of Indian Railways
- In office 2 September 2020 – 31 December 2020
- Preceded by: Post Established
- Succeeded by: Suneet Sharma

Chairman of Railway Board
- In office 1 January 2019 – 2 September 2020
- Preceded by: Ashwani Lohani
- Succeeded by: Himself (as Chairman and CEO of Railway Board)

Personal details
- Born: 1 January 1960 (age 66) Ballia, UP
- Education: (B.E). Motilal Nehru National Institute of Technology (M.B.A) La Trobe University (2007)
- Occupation: Civil servant, Engineer, Bureaucrat

Vinod Kumar Yadav (born 1 January 1960) is an Indian engineer from the 1980 batch of Indian Railway Service of Electrical Engineers who is working as the Director, Instrumentation, Automation, Surveillance & Communication Sector Skill Council. He completed his tenure as Director (Transport ), NCC Limited on September 30, 2025. He is Former Administrator of Delhi Gymkhana Club Limited and Former Chairman & Chief Executive Officer, Railway Board, Indian Railways. He previously served as the General Manager for South Central Railway Zone of Indian Railways and held various other important assignments in the Rail Vikas Nigam Limited, Dedicated Freight Corridor Corporation of India Limited and in the United Nations Industrial Development Organization.

== Personal life ==
Vinod Kumar Yadav was born on Jan 1, 1960 in Sukarauli Village, in Ballia District of Uttar Pradesh in India.

== Education ==
He received his early education at Ballia, graduated with a bachelor's degree in Engineering (Electrical Engineering) from Motilal Nehru Regional Engineering College (now Motilal Nehru National Institute of Technology), University of Allahabad in 1980. His academic pursuits include a master's degree in Business Administration – MBA (Technology Management) from La Trobe University, Australia.

== Career ==
Vinod Kumar Yadav began his career on Indian Railways as Assistant Electrical Engineer in February, 1982. He held several important executive and managerial positions on Indian Railways and on deputation to various Organizations including as Chairman Railway Board of Indian Railways, General Manager of South Central Railway, a Zone of Indian Railways. Down the line, he also worked as Chief Electrical Engineer, Planning/Traction Distribution, Northern Railway; Divisional Railway Manager, Lucknow Division, North Eastern Railway; Additional Divisional Railway Manager (Operation), Delhi Division, Northern Railway. Group General Manager (Electrical), Dedicated Freight Corridor Corporation of India Limited; Programme Manager, Technology Diffusion and Support Programme and as Project Director, International Centre for Advancement of Manufacturing Technology at United Nations Industrial Development Organization (UNIDO); he was also the Director for Department of Industrial Policy & Promotion in Ministry of Industry Government of India. He was Executive Director, Railway Electrification Projects, Rail Vikas Nigam Limited, he also held an important foreign assignment as Deputy Manager (Electrical), IRCON at Turkey.

As General Manager of South Central Railway, he led the Zone to achieve record highest revenue during 2017-18 and 2018-19. Infrastructure Growth also touched peak with highest Kilometres of new rail lines, doubling & tripling and electrification getting completed. Digital transactions and environment friendly measures came to fore on South Central Railway under his initiative. He tied up with Indian School of Business to enable Railways undertake research, knowledge sharing and management training programs for Railway officers. Vinod Yadav was known for his stress on human resource management on Railways on the basis of steps such as job melas for children of Railway families, skill development programs, passport melas, significant hike in sports and welfare infrastructure, medical facilities etc. Vinod Yadav was instrumental in inventing a modern Gangmen Tool Kit, light in weight and easy to carry, changing the way, the safety ambassadors of Indian Railways can work.

Vinod Yadav headed World's third largest Rail network and led Indian Railways towards a giant leap in infrastructure development involving over Rs. 160 Lakh Crore of capex fund which brought about the biggest transformation in its working system.

Annapurna trains, Jai Kisan trains etc., marked his business model for Indian Railways.

Passenger train services also enhanced qualitatively with introduction of “Vande Bharat Express” also known as Train-18, an indigenously built Indian semi-high-speed Intercity Electric Multiple Unit. Introduction of “Tejas Express” - India's first semi-high speed fully air-conditioned train etc. Air-Conditioned local trains were introduced on Mumbai Suburban System.

Thanks to Vinod Yadav's plans, Indian Railways could take center stage in the battle to fight COVID-19 pandemic all over the country by keeping the Rail wheels moving.

India's first university focused on transport-related education, multidisciplinary research and training - National Rail & Transport Institute (NRTI) at Vadodara, India came up under him at the helm.

Digitised data management of Indian Railway workforce made a huge impact, amongst his plans.

Vinod Kumar Yadav undertook International assignment of planning, execution and commissioning of Railway Electrification projects for Turkish Railways and led the team to frame tender and undertake global contract for Over Head Electrification works for Iran Railways.

He played a key role in development of SMEs sector and technology transfer to SMEs, skill development, mobilisation of resources and implementation of six projects worth US$8.65 million. He managed a joint project of United Nations and Government of India for development of Small and Medium enterprises accruing US$6.6.million.

== Recognitions ==
Vinod Kumar Yadav is the recipient of "Eminent Engineer Award for the Year 2020" from the Institution of Engineering and Technology (IET).

He also received the Eminent Engineer Award for 2019 from the Union Ministry of Skill Development & Entrepreneurship; recognition from President of India for making Indian Railways the best organization for implementing Swacchata Action Plan 2018-2019.

As the head for South Central Railway, he enabled the Zone stand top on Indian Railways for overall performance efficiency in 2017-18, to receive Pandit Gobind Vallabh Pant Shield.

He also got the Award for Best Transformation Initiatives by the Ministry of Railways in 2017-2018.
