= All India Institute of Medical Sciences, Gorakhpur =

Medical institute in India

- Motto: IAST: Swasthya-rakshanaya cha vikar-prashamanya cha
- Motto in English: For the protection of health, and for the pacification of disease
- Type: Public Medical school
- Established: February 24, 2019; 7 years ago
- Budget: ₹291.44 crore (US$30 million)
- President: Dr. Hemant Kumar
- Director: Maj. Gen. (Dr.) Vibha Dutta, SM (Retd.)
- Location: State Highway 1, Kunraghat, Gorakhpur, Uttar Pradesh, 273008, India; 26.7465°N 83.4198°E
- Campus: 112 acres (45 ha); Urban
- Website: aiimsgorakhpur.edu.in
- Government of India (MoHFW)

Organisation
- Type: Teaching hospital

Services
- Standards: NMC, INI
- Emergency department: Level III Trauma Center
- Beds: 632

Helipads
- Helipad: Yes

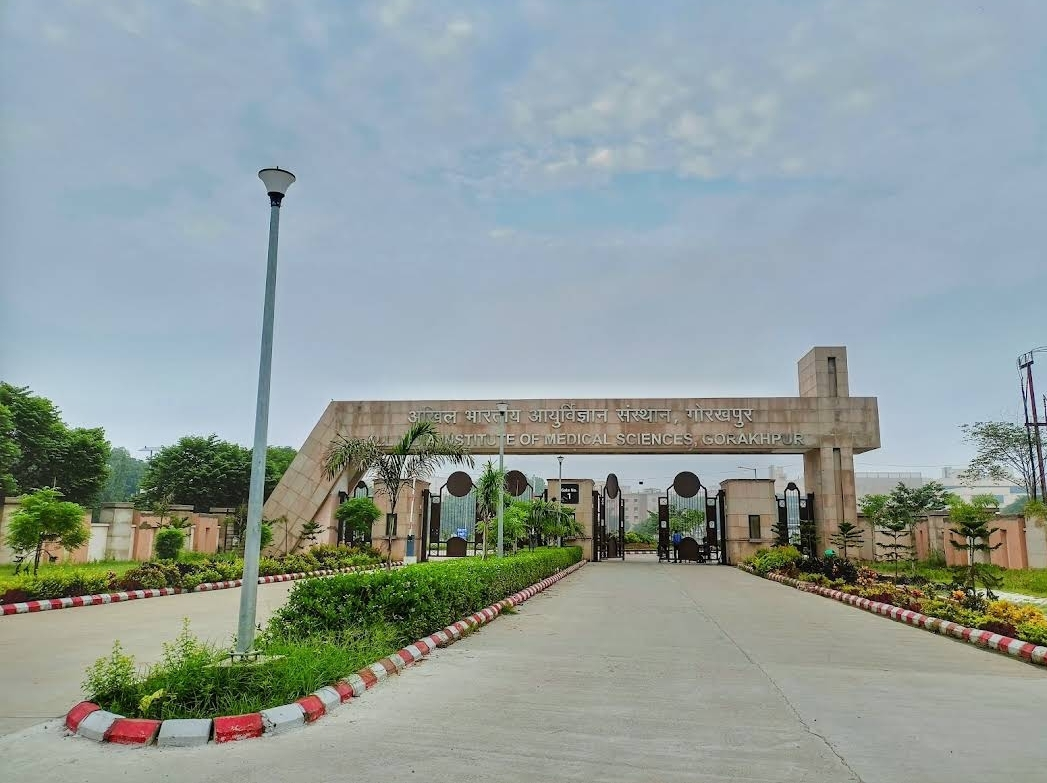
Main gate of AIIMS Gorakhpur

All India Institute of Medical Sciences, Gorakhpur, better known as AIIMS Gorakhpur, is a public medical university located in the Gorakhpur, Uttar Pradesh. It is one of the 20 operational AIIMS in India. It is one of the four "Phase-IV" All India Institutes of Medical Sciences (AIIMS) announced in July 2014 and established in 2019.

== History ==
In July 2014, in the budget speech for 2014–15, the Minister of Finance Arun Jaitley announced a budget of ₹500 crore (equivalent to ₹799 crore or US$83 million in 2023) for setting up four new AIIMS, in Andhra Pradesh, West Bengal, the Vidarbha region of Maharashtra and the Purvanchal region in Uttar Pradesh, the so-called "Phase-IV" institutes. Prime Minister Narendra Modi laid the foundation stone of AIIMS Gorakhpur on 22 July 2016. An outpatient department (OPD) started on 24 February 2019 and the first batch of 50 MBBS students started later that year, making it one of six AIIMSs to become operational in 2019. Surekha Kishor was appointed director in March 2020.

== Academics ==
It started operation of an outpatient department (OPD) in February 2019 and started MBBS courses later that year, making it one of the six AIIMSs to become operational in 2019.

=== Controversy ===
In 2019, the executive director of AIIMS Gorakhpur, Dr. Surekha Kishore, was alleged to have forced medical students to show her their private messages and files on their mobile phones. It was also alleged she directed guards of the institutes to confine students in their rooms. She was removed on 4 January, 2024, on financial irregularities and nepotism charges.

== OPD ==
As of August 2025, the outpatient department (OPD) at AIIMS Gorakhpur reported a daily patient attendance ranging between 4,000 and 5,000, reflecting a significant rise in healthcare utilization at the institute.
