= Indian Railway Service of Engineers =

Engineering Services of the Indian Railways

- State Emblem of India

- Flag of India

The Indian Railways Service of Engineers (IRSE) is one of the oldest group 'A' central engineering services recruited through the Indian Railway Management service exam conducted by the Union Public Service Commission. The officers of this service are responsible for administering the Civil Engineering organisation of the Indian Railways.

== Recruitment ==
The recruitment to the IRSE is done through the Engineering Services Examination conducted by the Union Public Service Commission for engineering graduates.

Selected candidates of civil engineering join the IRSE and are finally inducted into the railways after one and a half years of training to manage the fixed infrastructure assets of Indian Railways.

The selection exam is conducted by the Union Public Service Commission (UPSC) of India. The UPSC is responsible for recruiting middle and top-level bureaucrats for the Government of India.

== Role and function ==
The Civil engineering department of Indian Railways is managed by IRSE cadre which is one of the oldest services of India. These officers are responsible for the maintenance of all fixed assets of Indian railways, i.e. Track, Bridges, Buildings, Roads, Water supply, land etc. Those fixed assets are 45% of the total assets of Indian Railways. In addition to maintenance of existing assets, IRSE officers are responsible for the construction of new assets such as new lines, gauge conversion, doubling and other expansion and developmental works in Railways. They are also responsible for the safety and punctuality of Indian Railways.

Recruitment to service is done on the basis of "Engineering Services" examination conducted by the Union Public Service Commission every year in January. The number of new recruits varies each year. Presently, intake is about 45 probationers per year.

An aspirant is not necessarily a Civil Engineering graduate. Indeed he needs to appear for the Civil Engineering stream in Engineering services exam and become qualified.

After recruitment, the probationer is given 18 months' intensive training in various Railways establishments under the guidance of Indian Railways Institute of Civil Engineering, Pune (IRICEN).

A young probationer, after 18 months of rigorous and multi-dimensional training, is posted as Assistant Divisional Engineer (ADEN) which has historically been called AEN (Assistant Engineer) and can rise up to Chairman Railway Board, ex officio Principal Secretary to Government of India. Normally, all the IRSE officers rise up to a minimum level of Additional General Manager or Principal Chief Engineer or Chief Administrative Officer (Construction) rank in the Railways which is equivalent to Additional Secretary to the Government of India. The civil engineering department, at the railway board level, is headed by Member Infrastructure (ex officio Secretary to the Government of India) which is the highest specialized post for an IRSE officer.

Theoretically, an IRSE officer is on duty 24 hours a day, 365 days a year.

== Organisation ==
There are about 1958 serving officers in the IRSE. The management of department has three levels.

=== Apex level ===
This level dictates major policies pertaining to India’s rail infrastructure. At its helm at the Ministry/Railway Board level is the M-Infra (Member-Infrastructure) & ex-officio Secretary to the Government of India, who works in tandem with dedicated Special Secretary to the Government of India ranking Additional Members for Civil Engineering, Works, Bridges, Station Development, and Land & Amenities in addition to Principal Executive Directors and Executive Directors holding the rank of Additional Secretary and Joint Secretary to the Govt of India respectively.

=== Zone level ===
The Indian Railways has 18 Zonal Railways with an average track length of about 4000 km and average staff strength of about 80,000 headed by GMs. The Zonal Organizational structure of Engineering department is headed by the Principal Chief Engineer (PCE) ranked equivalent to an Additional Secretary in the Union Govt, with various designated Chief Engineers (equivalent to Joint Secretaries to the Govt of India) for track, bridge, planning, track machines, general matters etc.

In addition, each Zonal Railway has a construction unit headed by a Chief Administrative Officer who is ranked at par with an Additional Secretary to the Govt of India. He is responsible for major construction works such as new lines, doubling, gauge conversions etc. He works in unison with a number of chief engineers (construction), who hold the rank of Joint Secretaries to the Govt of India.

=== Division level ===
Each Zone is divided into 3-7 Divisions each with an average track length of about 1000 km and staff strength of about 15000 headed overall by DRM (Divisional Railway Manager). These are basic units for execution of works.

At this Level, the Engineering department is headed by Sr.DEN/C (Senior Divisional Engineer, Co-ordination). A division consists of 2 to 5 sections which are managed by a sectional Sr.DEN (Senior Divisional Engineer) or DEN (Divisional Engineer). A new probationer joins as Assistant Divisional Engineer and commands about 500 to 1000 staff spread over 200 km of jurisdiction.

== Hierarchy ==
Grade	Designation in the field	Designation in Headquarters	Basic pay
Apex Scale (Pay level 17)	Nil	Chairman & CEO, Railway Board Secretary	₹225,000 (US$2,300)
Higher Administrative Grade (+) (Pay level 16)	General Manager Additional Secretary	Member (Infrastructure), Railway Board	₹205,400 (US$2,100)—₹224,400 (US$2,300)
Higher Administrative Grade (Pay level 15)	Principal Chief Engineer	Additional Member, Railway Board Additional Secretary	₹182,200 (US$1,900)—₹224,100 (US$2,300)
Senior Administrative Grade (Pay level 14)	Chief Engineer	Executive Director Joint Secretary	₹144,200 (US$1,500)—₹218,200 (US$2,300)
Junior Administrative Grade (Functional) (Pay level 13)	Senior Divisional Engineer / Deputy Chief Engineer	Director	₹123,100 (US$1,300)—₹215,900 (US$2,200)
Senior Time Scale (Non Functional) (Pay level 12)	Deputy Chief Engineer	Joint Director Deputy Secretary	₹78,800 (US$820)—₹209,200 (US$2,200)
Senior Time Scale (Pay level 11)	Divisional Engineer	Deputy Director Under Secretary	₹67,700 (US$700)—₹208,700 (US$2,200)
Junior Time Scale (Pay level 10)	Assistant Divisional Engineer	Assistant Director Assistant Secretary	₹56,100 (US$580)—₹177,500 (US$1,800)

== Training ==
The initial and refresher training of IRSE is done at Indian Railways Institute of Civil Engineering.

== See also ==
- Centralised Training Institutes of the Indian Railways
- Indian Engineering Service
- Indian Railways Management Service
- Indian Railways organisational structure
