= Vivek Sahai =

Indian transportation expert

- Born: Uttar Pradesh, India
- Education: University of Allahabad, Muir Hostel
- Occupation: Retired Bureaucrat

Vivek Sahai is a transportation and management expert in India. He is a 1973 batch Indian Railway Traffic Service officer. He was appointed as Chairman Railway Board from 01-06-2010 to 30-06-2011 and ex-officio Principal Secretary to the Government of India. Additionally, he was the chairman at Dedicated Freight Corridor Corporation of India Limited, and served on the National Transport Development Policy Committee for the Government of India. In the past, he served as a Director of Coal India Limited from July 9, 2007, to August 20, 2008, and Indian Railway Catering and Tourism Corporation Ltd until July 26, 2011. He has also served as Director at Pipavav Railway Corporation Limited.

He is particularly lauded for handling the Railways response to the Mumbai serial blasts in 2006

After retirement, he was recalled in 2013 to serve as an adviser to the railway minister to help steer large projects.

Sahai is a distinguished fellow at the Observer Research Foundation.
