= Central Road Research Institute =

Government research institute in New Delhi, India

Central Road Research Institute केंद्रीय सड़क अनुसंधान संस्थान
- Parent institution: Council of Scientific and Industrial Research
- Founders: Ministry of Science and Technology (Government of India)
- Established: 1952; 74 years ago
- President: Prime Minister of India
- Director: Dr. Ch. Ravi Sekhar
- Location: Okhla, New Delhi
- Website: www.crridom.gov.in

The Central Road Research Institute (CRRI) established in 1952 is a constituent laboratory of India's Council of Scientific and Industrial Research (CSIR). The CRRI is located on Mathura road in Okhla, New Delhi and conducts research and development in the areas of design, construction, maintenance and management of roads and airport runways. It also works in area of traffic and surface transportation planning.

== Details ==
Central Road Research Institute (CRRI), a premier national laboratory established in 1952, a constituent of Council of Scientific and Industrial Research (CSIR) is engaged in carrying out research and development projects on design, construction and maintenance of roads and runways, traffic and transportation planning of mega and medium cities, management of roads in different terrains, improvement of marginal materials, utilization of industrial waste in road construction, landslide control, ground improvements environmental pollution, road traffic safety and analysis & design, wind, fatigue, corrosion studies, performance monitoring/evaluation, service life assessment and rehabilitation of highway and railway bridges.

The institute provides technical and consultancy services to various user organizations in India and abroad. For capacity building of human resources in the area of highway Engineering to undertake and execute roads and runway projects, Institute has the competence to organize National and International Training Programmes continuing education courses since 1962 to disseminate the R&D finding to the masses.

== Departments ==
List of departments in Central Road Research Institute (CRRI) is as follows:

- Planning, Monitoring and Evaluation
- Transport Planning and Environment
- Bridge Engineering and Structures
- Geotechnical Engineering
- Traffic Engineering and Safety
- Pavement Evaluation
- Quality Management
- Rigid Pavement
- Flexible Pavement
- Computer Center & Networking
- Information, Liaison & Training

== List of Directors ==
The list of Directors of Central Road Research Institute (CRRI) is as follows:

No.	Name	From	To
15	Dr. Chalumuri Ravi Sekhar	2026	
14	Prof. Manoranjan Parida	20.09.2022	2025
13	Dr. Ranjana Aggarwal	2022	2022
12	Dr. Satish Chandra	2016	2022
11	Dr. S. Gangopadhyay	2009	2015
10	Dr. Vikram Kumar	2007	2008
9	Dr. P. K. Nanda	2004	2007
8	Dr. P. K. Sikdar	1998	2004
7	Dr. A. K. Gupta	2006	2007
6	Dr. D. V. Singh	2002	2006
5	Dr. M. P. Dhir	1983	1989
4	Prof. C. G. Swaminathan	1977	1983
3	Dr. B. H. Subbaraju	1968	1977
2	Prof. S. R. Mehta	1955	1968
1	Dr. E. Zipkes	1950	1954
