= Secretary General of the Rajya Sabha =

Head of the Rajya Sabha Secretariat

- Rajya Sabha (Council of States)

- Flag of India

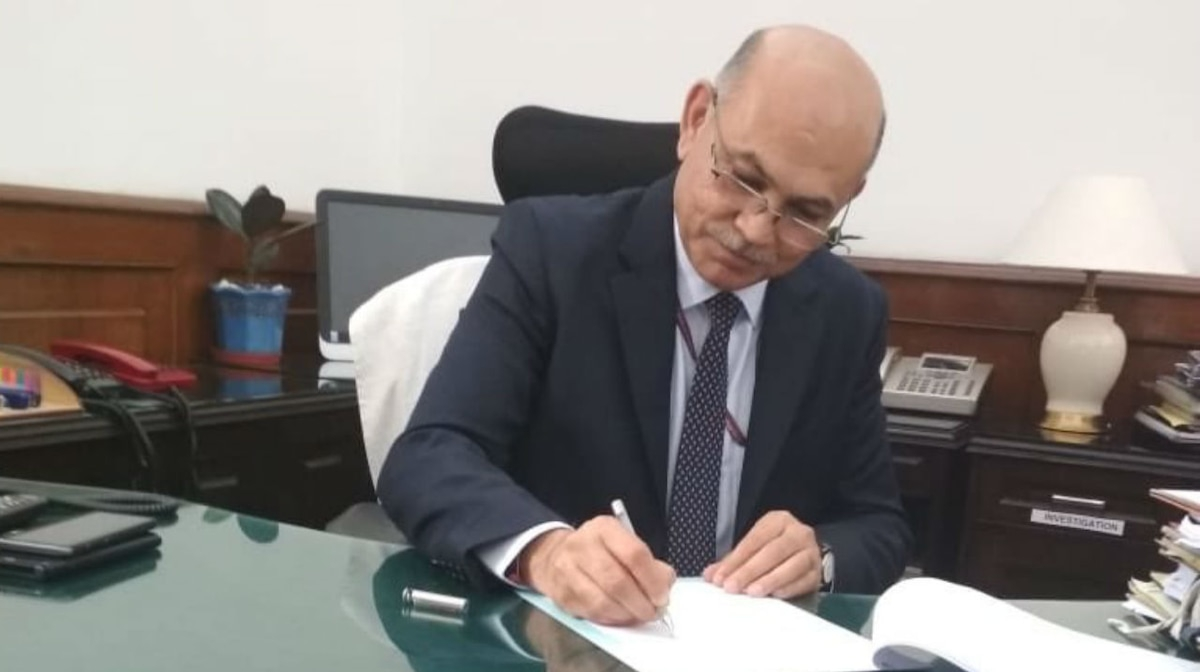
- Incumbent; Pramod Chandra Mody since 12 November 2021
- Type: Head of the Rajya Sabha Secretariat
- Appointer: Chairman of Rajya Sabha
- Inaugural holder: S. N. Mukherjee (1952–1963)
- Formation: May 1952 (74 years ago)
- Website: rajyasabha.nic.in

The Secretary General of the Rajya Sabha is the administrative head of the Rajya Sabha Secretariat. The secretary general is appointed by the Chairman of Rajya Sabha (Vice President of India). In Indian order of precedence, the post of secretary general is of the rank of Cabinet Secretary, who is the senior most bureaucrat in the Government of India.

== Role ==
As the administrative head of the Rajya Sabha secretariat, the secretary general exercises the power vested in the Chairman of Rajya Sabha, including the determination of the strength, method of recruitment and of qualifications for various categories of post. The secretary general exercises financial powers and initiates budget proposals relating to the Rajya Sabha. The secretary general is assisted by a hierarchy of officers as Secretary, Joint Secretaries and Directors, who with the help of subordinate officers perform the entire functions of the Secretariat.

It is the responsibility of the secretary general to summon each Member of Rajya Sabha to attend session of Parliament. When the President arrives to address Parliament, the secretary general along with Prime Minister, Vice President, Lok Sabha Speaker, Minister of Parliamentary Affairs receive the President at the gate of Parliament House and escorts the President to the Central Hall of the Parliament.

The secretary general prepares a list of business for each day of the session in Rajya Sabha. The secretary general signs messages to be sent from Rajya Sabha to Lok Sabha and reports to the house messages received from the Lok Sabha. For the elections of President and Vice President, Secretary General of Rajya Sabha or Lok Sabha is appointed as returning officer along with one or more assistant returning officers.

== List of Secretary General of the Rajya Sabha ==
List of Secretary General of the Rajya Sabha
No.	Name	Term of office		
No.	Name	Took office	Left office	Time in office
1	S. N. Mukherjee	13 May 1952	8 October 1963	11 years, 148 days
2	B. N. Banerjee	9 October 1963	31 March 1976	12 years, 174 days
3	S. S. Bhalerao	1 April 1976	30 April 1981	5 years, 29 days
4	Sudarshan Agarwal	1 May 1981	30 June 1993	12 years, 60 days
5	V. S. Ramadevi	1 July 1993	25 July 1997	4 years, 24 days
6	S. S. Sohoni	25 July 1997	2 October 1997	69 days
7	Ramesh Chandra Tripathi	3 October 1997	31 August 2002	4 years, 332 days
8	Yogendra Narain	1 September 2002	14 September 2007	5 years, 13 days
9	V. K. Agnihotri	29 October 2007	30 September 2012	4 years, 337 days
10	Shumsher K. Sheriff	1 October 2012	31 August 2017	4 years, 334 days
11	Desh Deepak Verma	1 September 2017	31 August 2021	3 years, 364 days
12	P. P. K. Ramacharyulu	1 September 2021	11 November 2021	71 days
13	Pramod Chandra Mody	12 November 2021	Incumbent	4 years, 299 days

== See also ==
- Parliament of India
- Rajya Sabha
- Rajya Sabha Secretariat
- Chairman of the Rajya Sabha
- Deputy Chairman of the Rajya Sabha
- Leader of the House in Rajya Sabha
- Leader of the Opposition in Rajya Sabha
- Secretary General of the Lok Sabha
