= Rajendra Kumar Acharya =

Nepali judge

Rajendra Kumar Acharya राजेन्द्र कुमार आचार्य
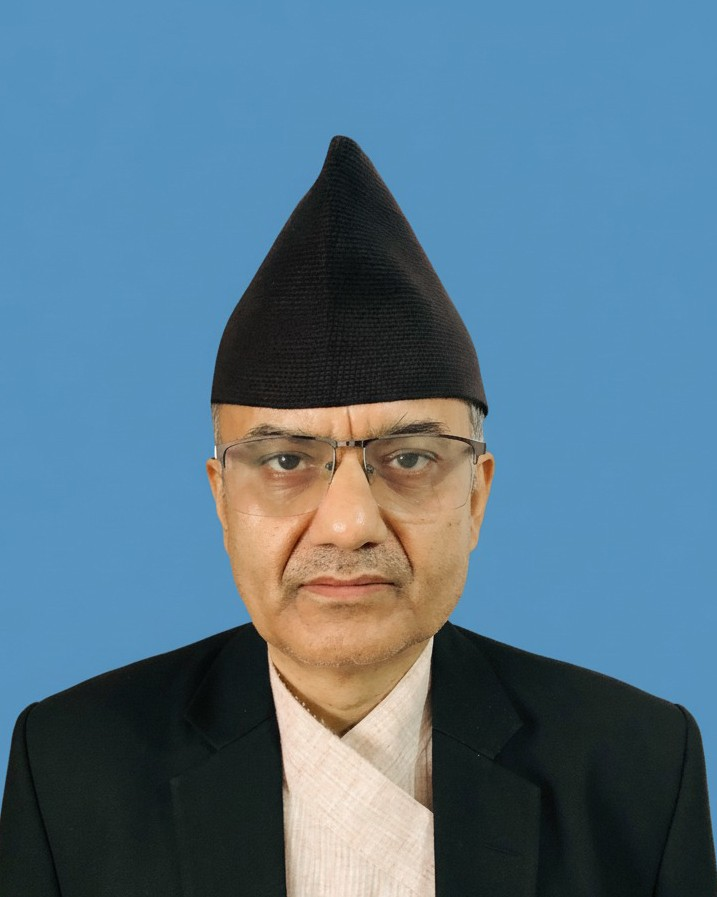

Judge, Nawalparasi District Court

Personal details
- Born: 1 October 1969 (age 57) Arghakhanchi
- Education: Allahabad University, Tribhuvan University

Rajendra Kumar Acharya, (Nepali: राजेन्‍द्रकुमार आचार्य) is a district judge and former Director of Judgement Execution Directorate, Supreme Court of Nepal.

== Early life ==
Acharya was born on 1 October 1969 in Arghakhanchi.

== Notable cases ==
- In 2024, Acharya sentenced Budhanilkantha Municipality Mayor Mitharam Adhikari and three local officials to one month in prison for contempt of court.
- He directed the judicial custody of former MP Yog Narayan Yadav in connection with a murder case in which 2 were killed and 10 injured during a violent clash in Sabaila village’s school management committee election in 2015.
- In 2023, Acharya issued another order to detain MLA Anirudh Singh Yadav for a pending murder trial.

=== Rape cases ===
==== Rape and murder of Nirmala Panta ====
- In 2019, Acharya granted bail to the eight police officials, including Superintendent of Police (SP) Dilli Raj Bista and Deputy Superintendent of Police (DSP) Angur GC who were accused of torturing and destructing the evidence in Nirmala Panta case. Police officers were suspended following the FIR filed by Nirmala's mother Durga Devi which she later revealed that did so without reading the names completely. They were later acquitted by the court.
- In the same case, Acharya charged journalist Khem Bhandari, with defamation of the court, including a one-hour jail term and a fine of Rupee 1, for ‘sensationalizing’ the rape of a minor girl and publishing ‘distorted’ news of the incident. Kanchanpur District Bar Association lodged a case against him accusing him of defamation of the court and of interfering with the court's procedure. Bhandari, who turned out to be the relative of prime suspect Dilip Singh Bista, had accused Nirmala's mother, Durga Devi, of ‘selling justice for her daughter for money’.

==== Banning leaked sexual harassment video ====
Two youths leaked a video of sexual assaulting a girl in a hotel. Acharya ordered the central government to remove the leaked pictures and videos from social media and take action against those posting such material as well as to ban such sites. The accused were later sentenced for seven years jail term and slapped a fine of Rs 200,000 each.

==== Fake rape case ====
Acharya sentenced a woman to a jail term of three and a half years in charge of falsely claiming that she was raped and defaming her colleague.

==== Rehabilitation of domestic violence victim ====
Acharya issued an interim protective order for the rehabilitation of a domestic violence victim. He ordered that the woman along with her two sons should be allowed to stay in her home and be spared from any physical and verbal abuse. In another case, Acharya sentenced the husband's family to six months imprisonment, fine along with compensation for the physical assault and inhuman treatment to a woman.

=== Banning election observers ===
In 2017 legislative election, Acharya complained Election Commission seeking to ban three European Union observers from monitoring the upcoming provincial and parliamentary polls in violation of the election code of conduct. The observers went to Kanchanpur District Court, without any prior permission, to enquire about human resources available in the court, which was beyond their jurisdiction. Later, Election Commission barred the European Union Election Observation Mission (EU EOM) observers from monitoring the election.

== See also ==
- Rape and murder of Nirmala Panta
