= Engineering Council of India =

Engineering Council of India (ECI) is a public society established on 4 April 2002 to work for the advancement of engineering profession in various disciplines and for enhancing the image of engineers in society, by focusing on the quality and accountability of engineers. The headquarters of ECI is in New Delhi, India.
