= Paul H. Appleby =

Theorist

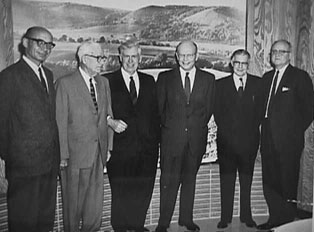
- A retired Paul Appleby (second from the right) at a USDA lecture series in 1961
- Born: Paul Henson Appleby; September 13, 1891; Greene County, Missouri, U.S.
- Died: October 21, 1963 (aged 72); U.S.
- Education: Grinnell College (A.B., 1913)
- Occupations: Journalist, public servant, educator
- Notable work: Big Democracy (1945); Policy and Administration (1949); Public Administration in India: A Report of a Survey (1953); Citizens as Sovereigns (1962)
- Spouse: Ruth Meyer (m. 1916)
- Children: Margaret Finley Appleby; Mary Ellen Appleby Sarbaugh; L. Tom Appleby

Paul Henson Appleby (September 13, 1891 – October 21, 1963) was an American journalist, public servant, and educator. He was the editor of Iowa Magazine in Waterloo, Iowa from 1920 to 1924. The four years following saw him as an editorial writer for the Des Moines Register and Tribune. In 1928, he moved to Virginia and published the News-Journal in Radford, Virginia. In 1933, he became Assistant to the Secretary of Agriculture, Henry A. Wallace. By 1940, he was the Undersecretary of Agriculture and in 1944 he became Assistant Director of the Budget for the United States. He left Washington DC to work for the radio station KIRO, returned to Washington DC and left again, this time to become the dean of Syracuse University’s Maxwell School of Citizenship and Public Affairs. He made several trips to India as a consultant with the Ford Foundation and in 1955 returned to political life by serving as Budget Director for the State of New York. He retired in 1957, but remained active in his role as a consultant to India and published several articles.

== Life and career ==
Appleby was born in Greene County, Missouri to Andrew B. and Mary (Johnson) Appleby. His family moved frequently, living in Missouri, Kansas, and Iowa. He attended high school in Newton, Iowa and graduated in 1913. He earned his A.B. from Grinnell College in 1913. He married Ruth Meyer on October 4, 1916. The couple had three children, Margaret Finley Appleby, Mary Ellen Appleby Sarbaugh, and L. Tom Appleby.

Appleby began his career as a newspaper publisher in Montana, Minnesota, and Iowa from 1914 through 1920. He was the editor of Iowa Magazine in Waterloo, Iowa from 1920 to 1924, and an editorial writer at the Des Moines Register and Tribune from 1924 until 1928. The family moved to Virginia in 1928 where Appleby again worked as a newspaper publisher until accepting a position with the U.S. government. He served as the Executive Assistant to the Secretary of Agriculture from 1933 through 1940 and the Under Secretary of Agriculture from 1940 until 1944 in Franklin D. Roosevelt's administration. In August 1942 he was elected the first Chairman of the International Wheat Council. He was Assistant Director of the U.S. Bureau of the Budget from 1944 through 1947 in the Truman Administration. In 1947, Appleby became the Dean of the Maxwell School of Citizenship and Public Affairs of Syracuse University, where he became a noted author of works in the field of public administration. Pandit Jawaharlal Nehru, the then Prime Minister of India established the Indian Institute of Public Administration (IIPA) on March 29, 1954 based on the recommendations of a survey carried out in 1953 by Prof. Paul H. Appleby, Dean, Maxwell School of Citizenship and Public Affairs, Syracuse University and a Consultant with the Ford Foundation invited to advice on the subject, by the Government of India.

== Publications ==
- Big Democracy, 1945
- Policy and Administration, 1949
- Public Administration in India: A Report of a Survey, 1953
- Re-examination of India's Administrative System, 1956
- Public Administration of a Welfare State, 1961
- Citizens as Sovereigns, 1962
- Morality and Administration in Democratic Government, 1969

== General References ==
- Paul H. Appleby Papers, 1944-1956. M.E. Grenander Department of Special Collections and Archives, University Libraries, University at Albany, State University of New York (hereafter referred to as the Appleby Papers).
