= Indian Railway Service of Electrical Engineers =

Bureaucratic Arm of Indian Railways

- State Emblem of India

- Flag of India

The Indian Railway Service of Electrical Engineers (IRSEE) is a group A central engineering services of the Indian railways. The officers of this service are responsible for managing the Electrical Engineering organisation of the Indian Railways.

The Indian railways have technical and non-technical departments for its operation and management which form the base structure on which the railways function. Technical departments include civil, electrical and mechanical engineering, signaling and telecom, and several others dealing with similar disciplines, control of operation and movement is done by traffic services (IRTS) while the non-technical departments include general services such as accounts, personnel management, Railway protection Force (RPF) or security, among others. Each department has staff at various levels. The highest are the Group A officers, while the lowest in rank are the Group D staff members.

The current Key Officials leading the IRSEE Cadre are PCEE Shri. A.K. Agarwal and CEGE CR- Shri. Shailendra Singh Parihar.

IRSEE falls under the category of Group "A" officers.

== Recruitment ==
The recruitment to the IRSEE cadre is done through the Indian Engineering Services Exam (ESE), conducted by the Union Public Service Commission (UPSC) of India. The UPSC is responsible for recruiting middle and top-level bureaucrats for the Government of India. The Present IRSEE Cadre Strength is around 2000 .

== Role and function ==
The officers of this cadre are responsible to maintain the assets of the Electrical Department in Indian railways. Mainly divided in following branches General Service(G), Traction Operation(TrO), Traction distribution(TrD), Traction Rolling Stock(TRS). Traction Rolling Stock includes production and maintenance of Electric Locomotives, Electrical Multiple Units(EMUs) and Main Line EMUs(MEMUs). Traction Distribution includes the maintenance of substations(PS) and Over Head Equipments(OHE) involved in movement of Rolling Stock. These assets are monitored and controlled by SCADA system.

== History ==
The IRSEE was created as an organised service after the nationalisation of the Indian Railways (1947–50). The Electrical Department was designated a minor department and was under the Mechanical Department (the major department) headed by Member (Mechanical) Railway Board. The Advisor (Electrical) reported to the Member (Mechanical) at the Railway Board.

In 1987, after the Fourth Pay Commission, the Railway Board was expanded and a Member (Electrical) created to look after the Electrical Department and the Signal & Telecommunications Department.

== Organisation ==
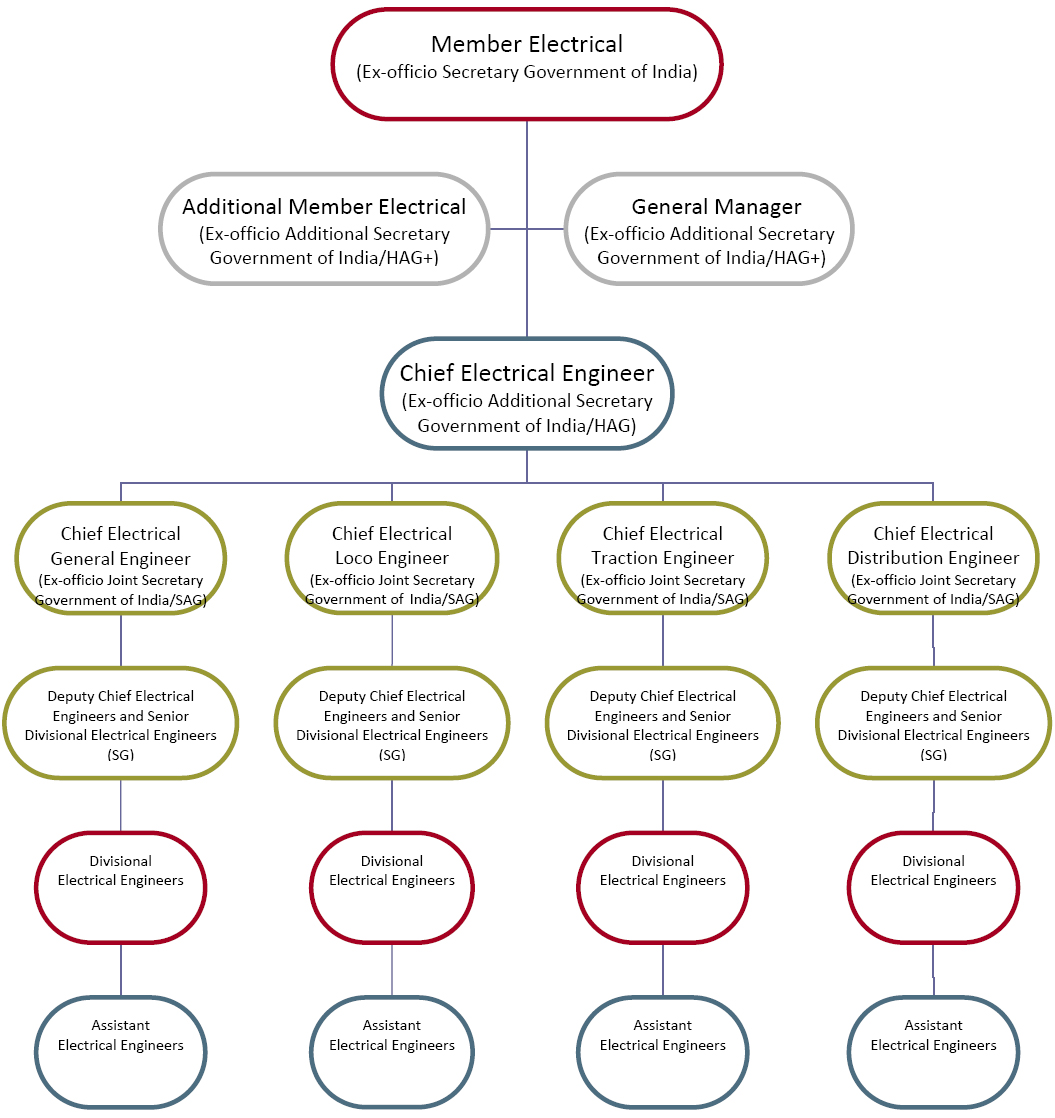

The IRSEE is headed by a Member (Traction & Rolling Stock) in the Railway Board (Ministry of Railways). Member (Traction & Rolling Stock) is better known by the acronym MTR&S. In each of the zones the organisation is headed by a Principal Chief Electrical Engineer. The PCEE reports to the General Manager of the Railway. The office of the Member (Traction & Rolling Stock) of the Railway Board guides the PCEE on technical matters and policy.

At the divisional level the Sr Divisional Electrical Engineers (General, Traction Operation, Traction Distribution, Electrical Loco Shed) head the organisation. The Sr DEE reports to the Divisional Railway Manager of the Division. Technical supervision is provided by the zonal Chief Electrical Engineer.

The probationers of IRSEE cadre are trained at IRIEEN (Indian Railways Institute of Electrical Engineering Nasik, Maharashtra. Names and phone numbers of IRSEE Central Railway Officers are available here IRSEE CR

== Hierarchy ==
Grade	Designation in the field	Designation in Headquarters	Basic pay
Apex Scale (Pay level 17)	Nil	Chairman & CEO, Railway Board Secretary	₹225,000 (US$2,300)
Higher Administrative Grade (+) (Pay level 16)	General Manager Additional Secretary	Member (Traction & Rolling Stock), Railway Board	₹205,400 (US$2,100)—₹224,400 (US$2,300)
Higher Administrative Grade (Pay level 15)	Principal Chief Electrical Engineer / Principal Chief Traction Engineer	Additional Member, Railway Board Additional Secretary	₹182,200 (US$1,900)—₹224,100 (US$2,300)
Senior Administrative Grade (Pay level 14)	Chief Electrical Engineer	Executive Director Joint Secretary	₹144,200 (US$1,500)—₹218,200 (US$2,300)
Junior Administrative Grade (Functional) (Pay level 13)	Senior Divisional Electrical Engineer / Deputy Chief Electrical Engineer	Director	₹123,100 (US$1,300)—₹215,900 (US$2,200)
Senior Time Scale (Non Functional) (Pay level 12)	Deputy Chief Electrical Engineer	Joint Director Deputy Secretary	₹78,800 (US$820)—₹209,200 (US$2,200)
Senior Time Scale (Pay level 11)	Divisional Electrical Engineer	Deputy Director Under Secretary	₹67,700 (US$700)—₹208,700 (US$2,200)
Junior Time Scale (Pay level 10)	Assistant Divisional Electrical Engineer	Assistant Director Assistant Secretary	₹56,100 (US$580)—₹177,500 (US$1,800)
