= Indian Railway Traffic Service =

Central Civil Service India

Service Overview
- Abbreviation: IRTS
- Formed: 1889
- Formerly known as: Officers of the Superior Revenue Establishment of the Traffic, Transportation and Commercial Department of Indian Railways
- Country: India
- Training Academy: Indian Railways Institute of Transport Management (IRITM), Lucknow
- Cadre Controlling Authority: Ministry of Railways (India)
- Legal Personality: Governmental, Civil Service
- General Nature: Logistics
- Cadre strength: Around 900
- Selection: Civil Services Exam (UPSC)
- Website: IRTS Association

Head of Department
- MOBD: Seema Kumar

The Indian Railway Traffic Service, abbreviated as IRTS, is a Group 'A' Central Civil Service cadre of the Government of India. IRTS in its present form was reconstituted in 1967. The IRTS cadre functions under the administrative control of the Ministry of Railways, Government of India. The civil servants under this service are responsible for the operation and business development of Indian Railways in the country. On one hand, IRTS officers co-ordinate among various technical departments of the Indian Railways, while on the other hand, they form the public interface of the Indian Railways. Colloquially called Traffic Officers, they are the primary facilitators of railway services right from planning of freight movement, passenger transport, passenger amenities to station management and infrastructure planning.

Traffic Department is responsible for optimum utilization of Railway assets and their seamless integration to provide a swift and safe transportation service and consequent realization of revenues in-line with the social obligations of the Indian Railways.

Traffic Department comprises two branches:

- Operations – deals with rail passenger and freight train logistics
- Commercial – deals with revenue earnings of railways

Officers may be shifted from one branch to another based on organisational requirements throughout their career.

== History ==
With the growing network and increasing traffic, the British Govt. recognized the need for a separate Traffic Department for handling train operations. The Traffic Service was created in the year in 1889 that was further strengthened in 1906. Earlier, an exclusive service reserved for English officers, admission into the cadre was thrown open to all post-Independence.

Initially known as "Officers of the Superior Revenue Establishment of the Traffic, Transportation and Commercial Department of Indian Railways", the service, on 4 March 1967 was rechristened "Indian Railway Traffic Service".

== The logo ==
The redesigned logo prominently features the following components

- Ashok stambh in gold.
- Pair of hands strongly holding up the Chakra signifying moving the nation towards prosperity and development.

A logo to represent the legacy of IRTS while highlighting its role in nation building in the times to come.

== Recruitment ==
There are two modes of recruitment to IRTS Group 'A':

- 50% through direct recruitment through the annual Civil Services Examination conducted by UPSC.
- 50% through promotion from Group B officers of Operating and Commercial departments of the Zonal Railways.

Current cadre strength of IRTS officers is around 900, serving in 68 divisions across 17 Zonal Railways in India and the Railway Board

== Training ==
After selection, the IRTS probationers undergo Foundation training at Lal Bahadur Shastri National Academy of Administration (LBSNAA), along with trainees of IAS, IPS and other Civil Services.

IRTS probationers then report to their Centralized Training Institute (CTI) - Indian Railways Institute for Transportation Management, Lucknow (IRITM) for joining formalities and induction into the cadre as Officer Trainees or Probationary Officers. This is followed by visit to a host of academies and institutions, over a period of next 78 weeks, to give wide-ranging exposure to officer trainees which would be useful in their career as railway officers. Some of these institutions include-

- Operations and Commercial Training at Indian Railways Institute for Transport Management, Lucknow (IRITM)
- Railway Foundation Course at National Academy of Indian Railway (NAIR), Vadodara.
- Operations Training at Zonal Railway Training Institute (ZRTI), Udaipur
- Marketing Management and Transport Economics at Indian Institute of Management (IIM)
- Operations Research at Indian Institute of Technology (IIT)
- Tourism and Hospitality management Training at Indian Railway Catering and Tourism Corporation (IRCTC)
- Vigilance and Anti-Corruption Training at Central Bureau of Investigation (CBI) Academy, Ghaziabad
- Accounts Training at Centralised Training Academy for Railway Accounts (C-TARA), Secundarabad
- Secretariat Training at Institute for Secretariat Training and Management (ISTM), New Delhi
- Ethical Governance Training at Initiatives of Change (IofC), Panchgani
- Accounts Training at National Academy Of Audit and Accounts (NAAA), Shimla
- Metro Rail Training at Delhi Metro Rail Corporation (DMRC), New Delhi
- Military Logistics Training at Sena Bhavan, New Delhi
- Appreciation program at Indian Military Academy (IMA), Dehradun
- Container Logistics Training at Inland Container Depot (ICD), Tughlaqabad
- Signals and Tele-communications Training at Indian Railways Institute of Signal Engineering and Telecommunications (IRISET), Secundarabad
- P-Way, Works and Contract Management Training at Indian Railways Institute of Civil Engineering (IRICEN), Pune
- Locomotive, Rolling Stock and Workshop Management Training at Indian Railways Institute of Mechanical and Electrical Engineering (IRIMEE), Jamalpur
- Electric Traction and Railway Electrification Management Training at Indian Railways Institute of Electrical Engineering (IRIEEN), Nashik
- Infrastructure Security Management Training at Jagjivan Ram Railway Protection Force Academy (JRRPF), Lucknow
- Railway Information Infrastructure Management Training at Centre for Railway information systems (CRIS), New Delhi
- Parliamentary Procedures Training at Bureau of Parliamentary Studies and Training (BPST), New Delhi
- Divisional attachments at 68 divisions spread across the length and breadth of the country
- Industrial Field visits – Coal India, Aditya Birla Cements, TATA, Bhilai Steel Plant
- Port Attachments – Paradip, Vishakhapatnam, JNPT, Mangalore, Krishnapatnam, Ennore etc.
- Appreciation Visits to various Railway establishments situated in difficult terrains – Konkan Railways, K-K Line, Shimla-Kalka Toy Train, Nilgiri Railway, Udhampur-Srinagar, Pamban Bridge
- Appreciation program at Indira Gandhi National Forest Academy (IGNFA), Dehradun
- Appreciation program at Forest Research Institute (FRI), Dehradun
- Appreciation program at Wildlife Institute of India (WII), Dehradun
- Foreign attachment with Deutsche Bahn and Siemens Mobility in Germany

== Role and function ==
The role of an IRTS officer in the Operations Department is that of ensuring efficient, safe and user friendly transportation of freight and passengers. He/She ensures optimum utilization of railway's assets by maximizing output with available inputs. This is achieved by coordinating with the service departments looking after various assets of railways like track, wagons, engines, signals, etc. He/She combines the outputs of the various departments maintaining the assets – rolling stock and fixed infrastructure to produce a service output – passenger or freight transport. This is done through the Control Office, which is said to be the nerve center of Railways, under the direct superintendence of IRTS officers posted in Operations Department.

In the Commercial Department, an IRTS officer is responsible for revenue realization for various services offered by Indian Railways. The commercial department reviews past sales and profit performance; assess the potential of the railways for improved performance and traffic growth, relative to competitors; develop a program of action to achieve projected growth in traffic; define or redefine marketing objectives; specify sales, pricing and promotional strategies to increase traffic; and establish methods and systems to monitor performance. The department is also concerned with provisioning of passenger amenities and redressal of customer complaints. Various passenger amenities in Railway Stations and Trains, like catering, stalls on the Railway Stations, services in trains and stations etc. come under the superintendence of IRTS Officers working in the Commercial Department.

Being the first point of contact with the Rail users they are the agents of change in the Railway system by conveying user expectations. The information technology requirement of passenger ticketing and freight realization is also managed by IRTS officers in the zonal headquarters in association with the Centre for Railway Information Systems (CRIS).

The role changes depending on where an officer is placed in the organization –

- Division (Operational level) - Real action in terms of implementation of policies occur here
- Zone (Tactical level) - Collation of Data, chasing of targets
- Railway Board (Strategic level) - Policy making and National Priorities of Railways vis-à-vis industries and other modes of transport

IRTS officers go for Deputation in various ministries of Government of India. They are particularly sought after for their exceptional work ethic and result oriented functioning. IRTS officers are also preferred in projects related to infrastructure and marshaling of technical resources.

The opening up of Indian economy has brought a paradigm shift in the role of IRTS officers – from rail transport to logistics. They have been instrumental in raising the earnings of Indian Railways through efficient freight movement and improved passenger transport which are conducted 24x7 non-stop.

== Hierarchy ==
Grade	Designation in the field	Designation in Headquarters	Basic pay
Apex Scale (Pay level 17)	Nil	Chairman & CEO, Railway Board Secretary	₹225,000 (US$2,400)
Higher Administrative Grade (+) (Pay level 16)	General Manager Additional Secretary	Member (Operations & Business Development), Railway Board	₹205,400 (US$2,200)—₹224,400 (US$2,400)
Higher Administrative Grade (Pay level 15)	Principal Chief Operations Manager / Principal Chief Commercial Manager	Additional Member, Railway Board Additional Secretary	₹182,200 (US$1,900)—₹224,100 (US$2,400)
Senior Administrative Grade (Pay level 14)	Chief Operations Manager / Chief Commercial Manager	Executive Director Joint Secretary	₹144,200 (US$1,500)—₹218,200 (US$2,300)
Junior Administrative Grade (Functional) (Pay level 13)	Senior Divisional Operations Manager / Senior Divisional Commercial Manager	Director	₹123,100 (US$1,300)—₹215,900 (US$2,300)
Senior Time Scale (Non Functional) (Pay level 12)	Divisional Operations Manager / Divisional Commercial Manager (Selection Grade)	Joint Director Deputy Secretary	₹78,800 (US$840)—₹209.2 (US$2.20)
Senior Time Scale (Pay level 11)	Divisional Operations Manager / Divisional Commercial Manager	Deputy Director Under Secretary	₹67,700 (US$720)—₹208.7 (US$2.20)
Junior Time Scale (Pay level 10)	Assistant Divisional Operations Manager / Assistant Divisional Commercial Manager	Assistant Director Assistant Secretary	₹56,100 (US$600)—₹177.5 (US$1.90)

Generally, direct recruit officers are appointed in the Operations Department. They can also be posted in Indian Railway's major Railway Yards & Areas where they look after both Operations and Commercial aspects. In the present context, IRTS officers have better promotional avenues in initial stages among other Central Services. Also, due to Selection Grade being non-functional in Railways, all Railway Officers remain field level executives for relatively longer periods of time which make them quite effective at policy making.

== Challenges and opportunities ==
Managing rail operations across India involves significant logistical challenges due to the country's size and geographic diversity. Addressing these operational issues in real time requires coordination among various railway departments, district authorities, commercial entities, and the public. Within Indian Railways, officers of the Indian Railway Traffic Service (IRTS) are responsible for overseeing traffic management, optimizing train operations, and maintaining continuous rail service.

Railway transportation, being the most energy efficient and convenient over large distances is going to see increased patronization, by passengers and businesses alike, in the coming decades. Movement of this increased traffic over vast but capacity constrained Indian Railway network is going to be challenging for IRTS Officers to organize

== Distinguished officers ==
=== Shyamal Ghosh Dastidar ===
Shyamal Ghosh Dastidar belongs to 1969 batch of IRTS officers. He has been an officer, who always successfully experimented with new ideas and innovation into the system, and benefited the organisation immensely. He served in various capacities, which included Sr. DOM/Dhanbad division, DRM/Bilaspur division, COM/South Central Railway and GM/Central Railway. Working as Member Traffic from 2005 to 2007, he made exemplary contributions in the turnaround of economic status of the organisation. He also led the development of work for preparing the blueprint for dedicated freight corridors.

For his efforts in the development of railway business and economy of the country, Ghosh Dastidar was honoured with the title Padmashree.

=== Vinay Mittal ===
A 1975 batch Indian Railway Traffic Service (IRTS) officer, Vinay Mittal was the chairman, Railway Board (CRB) and ex officio principal secretary to the Government of India till 30 June 2013. During his long career spanning 38 years, Mittal held various key positions in the Indian Railways.

As chairman, Railway Board, Mittal also held the position of ex officio chairman of the Dedicated Freight Corridor Corporation of India Ltd (DFCCIL), which has been set up for constructing the two iconic high technology freight corridors of over 3000 km on the Eastern and Western flanks of the country being attempted on a scale of this magnitude for the first time in India.

He was appointed member, UPSC on 8 August 2013

Vinay Mittal has been appointed chairman of the Union Public Service Commission (UPSC) on 22 January 2018.

=== Ananda Shankar Jayant ===
Ananda Shankar Jayant is an Indian classical dancer, choreographer, scholar and bureaucrat, known for her proficiency in the classical dance forms of Bharatanatyam and Kuchipudi. She is the first woman officer in the Indian Railway Traffic Service on South Central Railway and her 2009 TED talk is ranked among the top twelve Incredible TED talks on cancer.

== See also ==
- Scope of Railway Transport
- 2000 Batch IRTS Officer appointed CVO of CBSE under Ministry of Human Resource Development
- IRTS Officers pens "Break-up" song for U.P based film
- Future prospects for IRTS officers in the Private sector
- Present role and future of IRTS by IRTS Association
- IRTS Officers appointed chairmen of Major Port Trusts
