= Indian Railway Accounts Service =

Central Civil Service in India

Indian Railway Account Service
Service Overview
- Abbreviation: IRAS
- Formed: 1920s
- Headquarters: Rail Bhavan; New Delhi
- Country: India
- Training Academy: Indian Railway Institute of Financial Management (IRIFM), Secunderabad https://irifm.indianrailways.gov.in/
- Controlling Authority: Ministry of Railways, Government of India
- Cadre Size: 800

Service Chief
- Member Finance (L/A): Mrs. Manjusha Jain, IRAS

Head of the Civil Services
- Cabinet Secretary: T. V. Somanathan, IAS

The Indian Railway Accounts Service (IRAS; Bharatiya Rail Lekha Seva) is one of the prestigious Group A Central Civil Service of the Government of India. The civil servants under this Service are responsible for the Accounts and Finance Management of the Indian Railways. About 25–30 IRAS officers are recruited every year through Civil Services Examination conducted by Union Public Service Commission. Currently, the IRAS Cadre has a strength of about 800 officers.

In recent there has been a lot of deliberation for merger of cadre of different cadre of Railway services under a unified service IRMS ( Indian Railway Management Service)to even out cadre disparities and end perceived departmentalism. However, on ground nothing has changed except new recruits since CSE 2022 have been categorised as IRMS( Account) instead of traditional IRAS.

== History of IRAS ==
In 1921, the Acworth Committee recommended, and ratified through the Resolution for separation in 1924, that the Indian Railways finances should be separated from the General Finances. This segregation of Railway Finances together with acceptance in principle at least of the responsibility for the direct operation of its Railways was a watershed moment in the history of Railway Account Service, as it was for the Railways as a whole.

The growth and genesis of the service can be traced to the Acworth Committee report and becomes evident from these significant recommendations which are quoted below:

"We recommend that the Finance Department should cease to control the internal finances of the Railways; that the Railways should have a separate Budget of their own, be responsible for earning and expending their own income and for providing such net revenues as is required to meet the interest on debt incurred on or to be incurred by the Government for Railways purposes; and that the Railways Budget should be presented to the Legislative Assembly not by the Finance minister of the council but by the member in charge of the Railways." (Paras 74, 76 and 127 of the Acworth Committee report)

"We recommend, that subject to independent audit by Government of India, the Railways Department should employ its own accounting staff and be responsible for its own accounts. We think that the present account and statistics should be thoroughly overhauled and remodeled with the assistance of experts familiar with recent practices in other countries." (Paras 129-134 of Acworth Committee Report)

"We recommend that greater facilities should be provided for training Indians for the superior posts in Railway service and that the process of their employment in such posts should be accelerated." (Paras 182-184 of Acworth Committee Report)

It further goes on to recommend that the "title of Railway Board be replaced by the title of Railway Commission and that under the member of Council for Communications there should be 4 commissioners and that out of the 4, one should be in charge of Finance and the organization ..."

With these recommendations not only was the segregation of Railway Finance clearly established, but the office of the Financial Commissioner was envisaged in an embryonic manner, and accordingly, the first Financial Commissioner was appointed on 1 April 1923. The necessity of such an appointment was thus emphasized by the Acworth Committee, The large financial responsibility of the department being perhaps sufficient justification in itself for the addition to the organization of a member competent to advise on the questions of great financial magnitude.

The need for a new service was reinforced by yet another recommendation of the Acworth Committee which was with regard to the Railway Department having its own accounting staff and being responsible for its accounts, subject to an independent audit by the Auditor General of India.

With the post of Financial Commissioner firmly in place, the requirement for an organisational set up with staff became imminent, and the ground was clearly laid for the growth of a new service which would henceforth meet the burgeoning needs of the increasingly autonomous finance department of Indian Railways.

Consequently, it was just a matter of time before new service would gently disengage itself from the shackles of the Indian Audit and Accounts Service and the embryonic growth of a new service would announce itself.

The process was now set in motion and in the late 1920s, the Government of India decided to form a new Class I central service, viz IRAS, which would occupy top ranks of the Railway Accounts Department gradually replacing Indian Audit and Accounts Service officers.

Accordingly, from 1 April 1929, the responsibility for the compilation of accounts for the Railways was taken over by the Financial Commissioner, Railways from the Auditor General. The Accounts organisation was thus brought under the control of the Financial Commissioner, Railways, and the Indian Railway Accounts Service was constituted simultaneously.

However, every process of birth has its hiccups, though technically it was intended that from 1929, recruitment should be for the new IRAS service, procedural formalities delayed this recruitment and so 2 officers of 1929 batch who were recruited for the Indian Audit and Accounts Service were "permanently seconded" to the IRAS. Accordingly, for the first time two officers, Mr Apjit Singh & Mr N C Deb joined the service. It was only in 1930 that two officers, Mr C T Venugopal and Mr D P Mathur, were recruited "directly" for the first time. The onward march of the service had clearly begun.

The closing years of the 1950s and the fore part of the 1960s remain perhaps the most memorable for the chronicler of IRAS in many ways. The cadre burgeoned by more than 50 in just three years. Massive investments in the second Five Year Plan provided a windfall for Indian Railways, with the inevitable challenge to finance management. Cadre management came to occupy the attention of the top brass. Modernisation of accounting work with mainframe computers also began in this period. The service continued to wade through these tumultuous waters through the 1960s and 1970s.

During the 1990s, the position of Indian Railways Finances deteriorated as the organisation hitherto had been working more for fulfilment of social obligations of the Government of India like providing employment, affordable and subsidised transport to the common public etc. The Rakesh Mohan Committee report in 2001 on Indian Railways Finances observed thus ...

The Indian Railways (IR) has been a vital component of the social, political and economic life of the country. IR's transportation network has played a key role in weaving India into a nation. This network has not only integrated markets but also people across the length and breadth of this huge country. IR's role in times of war and natural calamities has also been commendable: it has always risen to the occasion and transported men and materials in large numbers at short notice. It is because of these reasons that IR is one of the foremost institutions of the country today. At the same time, because of a series of developments in the 1990s, IR is today on the verge of a financial crisis. Urgent action is needed to revitalise it so that it can continue to serve the nation.

... These tendencies became accentuated in the 1990s and the economics of IR are now extremely vulnerable. For first time in 17 years last year IR was not able to pay a dividend to the government on its past investment. It is in financial crisis. Its ability to invest adequately in providing efficient and cost competitive services in the future is seriously in question. Thus IR is in a watershed period in its history today and therefore drastic action needs to be taken in a number of areas to make this august organisation the country's pride once again.

The officers of IRAS along with the executives responded to the challenges and within a short period of 5–6 years, Indian Railways was a financially vibrant organisation. In the year 2007–08, Indian Railways had a cash surplus of 250 billion rupees.

Recently, Finance department of Railways has embarked upon computerising its whole accounting and finance functions by implementing a customised software called AFRES (Advance Finance Railway Earning & Expenditure System). As decided by government of India at the end of 2019 all Railway services are to be merged into one service called Indian Railway Management Service. Moreover, Railway Board has been reconstituted with chairman and CEO as head and Member Finance, Member Transportation and Business Development, Member Infrastructure and Member Rolling Stock and Traction.

Firsts in IRAS –

First IRAS Officer	Mr Devender yadav, IRAS, 1930
First IRAS Financial Commissioner	Mr K S Bhandari, IRAS, 1939
First IRAS officer secretary to Government of India	Mr Y T Shah, IRAS, 1944
First IRAS General Manager	Mr R Narsimhan, IRAS, 1955
First Lady IRAS Officer	Mrs Priya Prakash, IRAS, 1957
First Lady IRAS Financial Commissioner(Railways)	Mrs Vijayalakshmi Viswanathan, IRAS, 1967
First lady IRAS officer to be appointed as Secretary to the Govt of India	Mrs Usha Mathur, IRAS

[Last Financial Commissioner(Railways) ] Mr Vijay Kumar, IRAS

== Attachments with various institutes ==
- Alma Mater at Indian Railway Institute of Financial Management, (IRIFM), Secunderabad http://irifm.org/
- Railway Foundation Course at National Academy of Indian Railway (NAIR), Vadodara.
- Tourism and Hospitality management Training at Indian Railway Catering and Tourism Corporation (IRCTC)
- Accounts Training at Centralised Training Academy for Railway Accounts (C-TARA), Secundarabad
- Secretariat Training at Institute for Institute of Secretariat Training and Management (ISTM), New Delhi
- Ethical Governance Training at Initiatives of Change (IofC), Panchgani
- Accounts Training at National Academy Of Audit and Accounts (NAAA), Shimla
- Container Logistics Training at Inland Container Depot (ICD), Tughlaqabad
- Signals and Tele-communications Training at Indian Railways Institute of Signal Engineering and Telecommunications (IRISET), Secundarabad
- P-Way, Works and Contract Management Training at Indian Railways Institute of Civil Engineering (IRICEN), Pune
- Locomotive, Rolling Stock and Workshop Management Training at Indian Railways Institute of Mechanical and Electrical Engineering (IRIMEE), Jamalpur
- Electric Traction and Railway Electrification Management Training at Indian Railway Institute of Electrical Engineering (IRIEEN), Nashik
- Infrastructure Security Management Training at Jagjivan Ram Railway Protection Force Academy (JRRPF), Lucknow
- Railway Information Infrastructure Management Training at Centre for Railway information systems (CRIS), New Delhi
- Parliamentary Procedures Training at Bureau of Parliamentary Studies and Training (BPST), New Delhi
- Divisional attachments at 68 divisions spread across the length and breadth of the country
- Industrial Field visits – Coal India, Aditya Birla Cements, TATA, Bhilai Steel Plant
- Port Attachments – Paradip, Vishakhapatnam, JNPT, Mangalore, Krishnapatnam, Ennore etc.
- Appreciation Visits to various Railway establishments situated in difficult terrains – Konkan Railways, K-K Line, Shimla-Kalka Toy Train, Nilgiri Railway, Udhampur-Srinagar, Pamban Bridge
- Foreign attachment at Canada/USA and Germany/France/Russia
- attachment at RBI
- Attachment at NADT, Nagpur( IRS IT Academy), at NACEN, Faridabad( IRS Custom Academy), at NAAA, Shimla (IAAS Academy)
- Attachment at NADFM, PUNE( IDAS Academy)
- attachment at NIFM, Faridabad

== Role and function ==
The Finance and Accounts functions are integrated with the executive at all levels in the Railways. At the apex level of policy formulation, the Financial Commissioner, Railways, assisted by Additional Member (Finance), Additional Member (Budget), Adviser (Finance) and Adviser (Accounting Reforms) in–charge of Budgeting, Expenditure, Earnings, Accounting and Accounting Development/Reforms, is there to aid and guide the Ministry of Railways (Railway Board). At the Zonal level, the General Manager is aided by the Financial Adviser and Chief Accounts Officer along with his assistants. At the Divisional level, which is only an administrative unit of a Zonal Railway, an identical arrangement exists to assist the Divisional Railway Manager in finance and accounts matters. Besides the major production units and workshops, be they manufacturing units or repair and maintenance units, have an inbuilt system of associate finance and accounts. The stores organisation, which is responsible for procurement of stores and materials worth thousands of crores of rupees, is again assisted by Finance & Accounts. In short, there is hardly any sphere of railway activity with which the Accounts and Finance organisation is not directly associated in the decision-making process. In addition, officers of the Service also occupy management posts such as Divisional Railway Managers, Additional General Managers etc.

IRAS cadre of Indian Railways is responsible for the Finance and Accounting functions of the Railways. Core functions of this cadre include maintenance of accounts of Indian Railways and Financial Advice to the executive. At the zonal level, IRAS officers are designated as Financial Advisor and Chief Account Officers while at the Division level, they are Divisional Finance Managers. Budget Management, Expenditure Control, Earnings Accountal, Financial scrutiny of various executive proposals are some of the functions performed by IRAS officers. Every expenditure in Indian Railways has to pass through Financial scrutiny. The IRAS cadre exercises substantial control over the affairs of the Indian Railways.

Officers of Indian Railway Accounts Service serve in various government ministries on deputation as Deputy Secretary/Director, Joint Secretary, Additional Secretary. They are also sent to various Public Sector undertakings on deputation to hold finance portfolios.

== Organisation ==
At the Apex level, the Financial Commissioner for Railways represents the Ministry of Finance on the Railway Board and also functions ex-officio as secretary to Government of India in the Ministry of Railways in financial matters. In this capacity, he is vested with full powers to sanction Railway expenditure subject to the general control of the Finance Minister. He has direct contact with the Finance Minister whom he keeps informed of developments in the Ministry of Railways. Organizational structure, further, varies as per the working at Railway board, Zonal level and divisional level.

At zonal railway, PFA (Principal Financial Advisor) is the highest IRAS officer (HAG Level) is supported by FA& CAO(Financial Advisor & Chief Account Officer, SAG Level) and Deputy FA& CAO (JAG Level) plus AFA (Asst. financial Advisor, ST/JT scale officer).

At divisional level Sr. DFM (generally JAG rank officer) is the highest account officer supported by DFM (Divisional Finance Manager, senior time scale officer) and ADFM (Asst. DFM, junior time scale officer).

Also, IRAS service provides opportunities for deputation at center in various ministries and in state in various capacities. They are also found to be the most sought after account officers because of their rigorous working background in railway system especially tendering, book and budget and so on.

They have been getting regular role in prominent PSUs as director finance, Chief vigilance officers (CVOs) etc. in their mid career level of deputation. Even they have gone on to head various metros (e.g. Hyderabad metro), have got foreign assignment as well in MEA.

Also, the promotion is found to be one of the fastest among all railway services in particular and in general reasonably good among other Central and all India services. The new cadre structuring is expected to further narrow down the gap IAS/IAAS commands. It is expected that in 17-18 year IRAS officers will be eligible for empanelment after getting SAG (IAAS/IAS/IFS in general get this in 16 years).

== Hierarchy ==
Grade	Designation in the field	Designation in Headquarters	Basic pay
Apex Scale (Pay level 17)	Nil	Chairman & CEO, Railway Board Secretary	₹225,000 (US$2,400)
Higher Administrative Grade (+) (Pay level 16)	General Manager Additional Secretary	Member (Finance), Railway Board	₹205,400 (US$2,200)—₹224,400 (US$2,400)
Higher Administrative Grade (Pay level 15)	Principal Financial Adviser / Principal Chief Accounts Officer	Additional Member, Railway Board Additional Secretary	₹182,200 (US$1,900)—₹224,100 (US$2,400)
Senior Administrative Grade (Pay level 14)	Chief Financial Adviser / Chief Accounts Officer	Executive Director Joint Secretary	₹144,200 (US$1,500)—₹218,200 (US$2,300)
Junior Administrative Grade (Functional) (Pay level 13)	Senior Divisional Finance Manager / Deputy Chief Accounts Officer	Director	₹123,100 (US$1,300)—₹215,900 (US$2,300)
Senior Time Scale (Non Functional) (Pay level 12)	Deputy Chief Accounts Officer	Joint Director Deputy Secretary	₹78,800 (US$840)—₹209.2 (US$2.20)
Senior Time Scale (Pay level 11)	Divisional Finance Manager / Accounts Officer	Deputy Director Under Secretary	₹67,700 (US$720)—₹208,700 (US$2,200)
Junior Time Scale (Pay level 10)	Assistant Divisional Finance Manager / Assistant Accounts Officer	Assistant Director Assistant Secretary	₹56,100 (US$600)—₹177.5 (US$1.90)

== See also ==
- Indian Railways
- Centralised Training Institutes of the Indian Railways
- Indian Railways organisational structure
- Civil Services of India
- All India Service
- Centralised Training Institutes of the Indian Railways
- Central Secretariat Service
- Railway Board Secretariat Service
