= Centralised Training Institutes of the Indian Railways =

Department of Indian railways

- Type: Training institutes
- Headquarters: India
- Owner: Indian Railways

The Centralised Training Institutes of the Indian Railways has eight constituent institutes. The Indian Railways is the largest civilian employer in the world at approximately 1.6 million employees. Around 12000 officers form the line and staff management. Training of all the management cadres is entrusted and shared between these eight institutes.

- Indian Railways Institute of Civil Engineering, Pune, for officers of civil engineering department.
- Indian Railways Institute of Electrical Engineering, Nasik, for officers of electrical engineering department.
- Indian Railways Institute of Financial Management, for officers of Accounts Service.
- Indian Railways Institute of Mechanical and Electrical Engineering, Jamalpur, for officers of mechanical and engineering department.
- Indian Railways Institute of Signal Engineering and Telecommunications, Secunderabad, for officers of S&T department.
- Indian Railways Track Machine Training Center
- National Academy of Indian Railways
- National Rail and Transportation Institute
- Railway Protection Force Academy, Lucknow, for officers of Railway Protection Force.
- Railway Staff College, Vadodara, for all officers and centralised training for officers of accounts, personnel, stores & medical departments.
- Centralized Training Academy of Railways Accounts, Vadodara, and Centralized Training Academy of Railways Accounts, Secunderabad, for financial & managerial training for officers & staff of accounts department.

== See also ==
- Indian Railways organisational structure
