= Indian Railways organisational structure =

Indian Railways is a statutory body under the ownership of the Ministry of Railways of the Government of India that operates India's national railway system. It is headed by a Railway Board whose chairman reports to the Ministry of Railways. It is organized into separate functional groups or verticals while divided into 19 operational zones geographically. Each zone, headed by a General Manager, is semi-autonomous thus creating a matrix organization where the functional branches are under dual control.

== Railway Board ==
In March 1905, the railway branch of the Public Works Department was transferred to the newly established railway board under the department of commerce and industry by the Indian Railway Board Act. In 1908, the set up was re-organized on the recommendations of the Railway Finance Committee (1908) by constituting the Railway Board headed by a president as a separate department. Pursuant to the Acworth committee's recommendations in 1921, the railway board was expanded to four members with the addition of a financial commissioner in 1924 apart from the chief commissioner, one commissioners responsible for ways and works, projects and stores and the other responsible for general administration, staff and traffic. In 1929, an additional member was added to the board and was assigned the responsibility for staff, so that the member in charge of traffic could focus solely on transport and commercial matters. In 1950, the railway board was re-constituted to four members with the senior-most functional member appointed the chairman of the board with no absolute over riding power. In October 1954, the chairman of the board was made responsible for decisions on technical and policy matters, with the status of a principal secretary to the Government of India with an additional member added. The board was expanded with an additional member responsible for electrical engineering in 1972 and a further member responsible for health in 1976. In 2004, the board is expanded by the introduction of two new members responsible for signalling & telecom and for stores respectively. In December 2019, the Union Cabinet decided to reduce the size of the board from eight to five. The chairman of the railway board reports to the Ministry of Railways and act on behalf of the ministry. The following report to the railway board:

- General managers of various zones
- Heads of functional divisions
- Heads/Managers of production units
- Heads of Public Sector Undertakings
- Heads of railway institutes
- Heads of special divisions

== Functional division ==
The organization is divided into separate functional groups of traction, engineering, traffic, rolling stock, signalling, materials, personnel, RPF, finance, health and safety.

== Zonal management ==
In 1944, all the railway companies in existence at the time were taken over by the Government. In December 1950, the Central Advisory Committee for Railways approved the plan for re-organizing Indian Railways into six regional zones which were divided subsequently to create newer zones. As of 2026, there are 19 operational zones of Indian Railways. The zones are headed by a General manager and are further sub-divided into divisions. Each division is headed by a Divisional Railway Manager (DRM), who are responsible for the operation and maintenance in the respective divisions. The 19 operational zones and their divisions are listed below. South Coast Railway zone is the newest railway zone.

Indian Railway Zones

Indian Railway zones
#	Railway zone	Code	Headquarters	Established	Route length (Note: as of June 2026)		Stations	Divisions
#	Railway zone	Code	Headquarters	Established	km	miles	Stations	Divisions
1	Northern Railway	NR	Delhi	April 14, 1952	7,363	4,575.2	1013	Ambala, Delhi, Firozpur, Lucknow, Moradabad, Jammu
2	North Eastern Railway	NER	Gorakhpur	April 14, 1952	3,470.5	2,156.5	537	Izzatnagar, Lucknow, Varanasi
3	Northeast Frontier Railway	NFR	Guwahati	January 15, 1958	4,348	2,701.7	547	Alipurduar, Katihar, Lumding, Rangiya, Tinsukia
4	Eastern Railway	ER	Kolkata	April 14, 1952	2,823.2	1,754.3	587	Asansol, Howrah, Malda, Sealdah
5	South Eastern Railway	SER	Kolkata	August 1, 1955	2,758.6	1,714.1	363	Adra, Chakradharpur, Kharagpur, Ranchi
6	South Central Railway	SCR	Secunderabad	October 2, 1965	3,572	2,219.5	362	Secunderabad, Hyderabad, Nanded
7	Southern Railway	SR	Chennai	April 14, 1950	5,093	3,164.6	718	Chennai, Madurai, Palakkad, Salem, Thiruvananthapuram, Tiruchirappalli
8	Central Railway	CR	Mumbai (CSMT)	November 5, 1951	4,203.3	2,611.8	486	Bhusawal, Mumbai CR, Nagpur, Pune, Solapur
9	Western Railway	WR	Mumbai (Churchgate)	November 5, 1951	6,156.6	3,825.5	1046	Ahmedabad, Bhavnagar, Mumbai WR, Rajkot, Ratlam, Vadodara
11	North Western Railway	NWR	Jaipur	October 1, 2002	5,705.6	3,545.3	578	Ajmer, Bikaner, Jaipur, Jodhpur
10	South Western Railway	SWR	Hubballi	April 3, 2003	3,692.34	2,294.3	397	Bengaluru, Hubballi, Mysuru
12	West Central Railway	WCR	Jabalpur	April 3, 2003	3,060	1,901.4	247	Bhopal, Jabalpur, Kota
13	North Central Railway	NCR	Prayagraj	April 3, 2003	3,522.6	2,188.8	411	Agra, Jhansi, Prayagraj
14	South East Central Railway	SECR	Bilaspur	April 1, 2003	2,396.6	1,489.2	358	Bilaspur, Nagpur, Raipur
15	East Coast Railway	ECoR	Bhubaneswar	April 3, 2003	2,701	1,678.3	133	Khurda Road, Sambalpur, Rayagada
16	East Central Railway	ECR	Hajipur	October 1, 2002	4,238	2,633.4	340	Danapur, Dhanbad, Mughalsarai, Samastipur, Sonpur
17	Konkan Railway	KR	Navi Mumbai	July 19, 1990	756.25	469.9	72	Ratnagiri, Karwar
18	South Coast Railway	SCoR	Visakhapatnam	June 1, 2026	3,532.407	2,194.9	385	Guntakal, Guntur, Vijayawada, Visakhapatnam
19	Metro Railway Kolkata	KMRC	Kolkata	October 14, 1984	73.2	45.5	58	

== Structure ==
In every zone, the functional verticals are represented by head of departments (HODs) responsible for the respective functions in the zone. Each division has functional staff who report to the geographical divisional managers and functional HODs in a matrix organization and are tasked with the operation and maintenance of assets.

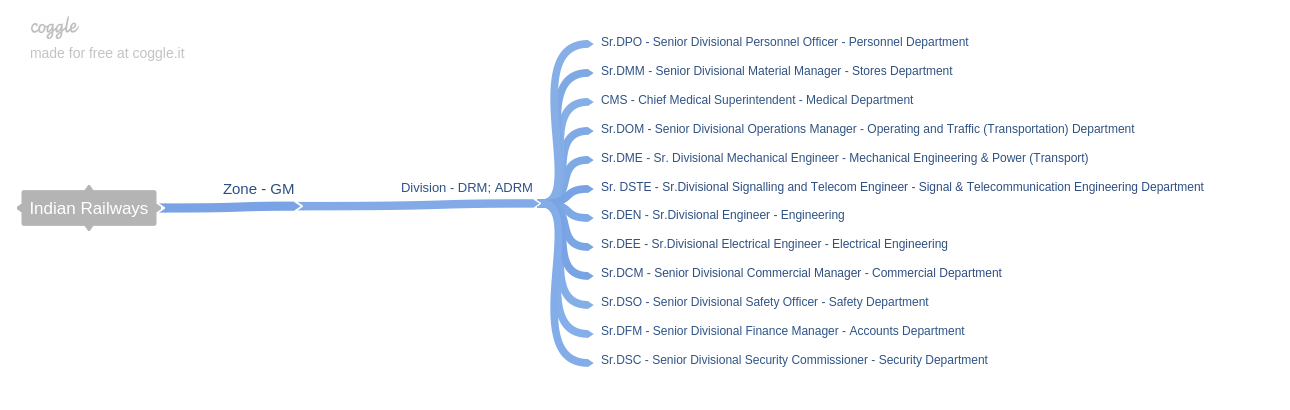
Departments & Roles

Zonal administration
Department	HOD	Divisional manager	Function
Stores	Principal Chief Materials Manager (PCMM)	Sr. Divisional Material Manager	Material stores for maintenance of infrastructure
Mechanical	Principal Chief Mechanical Engineer (PCME)	Sr. Divisional Mechanical Engineer (Diesel)	Maintenance of diesel locomotives
Mechanical	Principal Chief Mechanical Engineer (PCME)	Sr. Divisional Mechanical Engineer (Carriage & Wagon)	Maintenance of rolling stock
Electrical	Principal Chief Electrical Engineer (PCEE)	Sr. Divisional Electrical Engineer (General)	Maintenance of station lighting and power supply
Electrical	Principal Chief Electrical Engineer (PCEE)	Sr. Divisional Electrical Engineer (Traction distribution)	Maintenance of overhead equipment
Electrical	Principal Chief Electrical Engineer (PCEE)	Sr. Divisional Electrical Engineer (Traction rolling stock)	Maintenance of electric locomotives and Multiple units
Signal & Telecommunication	Principal Chief Signal & Telecom Engineer (PCSTE)	Sr. Divisional Signal & Telecommunication Engineer (DSTE)	Management of the signalling and telecommunication infrastructure
Engineering	Principal Chief Engineer (PCE)	Sr. Divisional Engineer	Maintenance of fixed assets
Engineering	Principal Chief Engineer (PCE)	Sectional Sr. Divisional Engineer	Maintenance of fixed assets
Operations	Principal Chief Operations Manager (PCOM)	Sr. Divisional Operations Manager	Train operations
Accounts	Principal Financial Advisor (PFA)	Sr. Divisional Finance Manager	Accounting and financials
Commercial	Principal Chief Commercial Manager (PCCM)	Sr. Divisional Commercial Manager	Passenger ticketing, checking, freight booking and fare collection
Medical	Principal Chief Medical Director (PCMD)	Chief Medical Superintendent	Providing medical facilities
Safety	Principal Chief Safety Officer (PCSO)	Sr. Divisional Safety Officer	Safety of train operations
Personnel	Principal Chief Personnel Officer (PCPO)	Sr. Divisional Personnel Officer	Human resources
Security	Principal Chief Security Commissioner (PCSC)	Sr. Divisional Security Commissioner	Security of railway material, passenger and belongings
Management	Additional General Manager (AGM)	Divisional Railway Manager	Management of all departments

== Human resources ==
Staff are classified into gazetted (Groups A and B) and non-gazetted (Groups C and D) employees with gazetted employees carrying out executive/managerial level tasks. As of March 2022, Groups A & B constitute 1.5% of the total workforce, while Group C & D account for 98.5%. 80% of Group-A employees are recruited through Indian Railways Management Service (IRMS) with remaining through promotions. The various Group A cadres are as below include:

- Central Civil Services recruitment through Civil Services Examination (CSE)
  - Indian Railway Traffic Service (IRTS)
  - Indian Railway Personnel Service (IRPS)
  - Indian Railway Accounts Service (IRAS)
  - Indian Railway Protection Force Service (IRPFS)
- Central Engineering Services recruitment through Engineering Services Examination (ESE)
  - Indian Railway Service of Engineers (IRSE)
  - Indian Railway Service of Electrical Engineers (IRSEE)
  - Indian Railway Service of Mechanical Engineers (IRSME)
  - Indian Railway Service of Signal Engineers (IRSSE)
  - Indian Railway Stores Service (IRSS)
- Central Health Science Services recruitment through Combined Medical Services Examination (CMSE)
  - Indian Railway Health Service (IRHS)

Group B employees are recruited by departmental promotional exams of Group C employees. Recruitment of Group C employees are through exams conducted by the Railway Recruitment Control Board (RRCB) and Group D staffs are recruited by zonal Railway Recruitment Cells (RRC). Indian Railways operates seven centralized training institutes and 295 training centers.

== See also ==
- Centralised Training Institutes of the Indian Railways
