= Indian Railways Institute of Civil Engineering =

Training institute for the civil engineers of the Indian Railways

Indian Railways Institute of Civil Engineering, Pune
- Official emblem of Indian Railways
- Established: 1988; 38 years ago
- Location: Pune, Maharashtra, India
- Coordinates: 18.94505°N 72.83352°E
- Interactive map of Indian Railways Institute of Civil Engineering, Pune
- Website: www.iricen.gov.in

The Indian Railways Institute of Civil Engineering, Pune (IRICEN) is a training institute for civil engineers of Indian Railways. It began in 1959 as the Permanent Way Training School for entry-level civil engineers and is now a Centralised Training Institute training officers of the IRSE cadre.

Based in Pune, IRICEN trains up to 100 engineers and managers at a time, including engineers from developing countries as well as other government departments and private organisations. Its training programmes are generally residential, supported by a technical library, computer centre, material testing laboratory, model room and museum, hostel, mess, and recreational facilities.

The institute also conducts training for railway engineers from agencies such as RITES, IRCON, NTPC, and MRVC.

== Sister organizations ==
IRICEN is one of six Centralised Training Institutes that share officer training duties. The other institutes are:

- Indian Railways Institute of Signal and Telecommunications Engineering, Secunderabad – for engineers of the signal and telecommunications department
- Indian Railways Institute of Mechanical and Electrical Engineering, Jamalpur – for mechanical engineers
- Indian Railways Institute of Electrical Engineering, Nashik – for electrical engineers
- RPF Academy, Lucknow – for officers of the Railway Protection Force
- National Academy of Indian Railways, Vadodara (formerly Railway Staff College) – apex training institute for officers across departments

== See also ==
- Indian Railways organisational structure
