= Government Railway Police =

Indian police branch for railways

- Seal of the Government of India
- Common name: State Railway Police
- Abbreviation: GRP

Agency overview
- Formed: 1887

Jurisdictional structure
- Operations jurisdiction: India
- Legal jurisdiction: States
- Governing body: State governments
- Constituting instrument: Railways Act, 1989

Operational structure
- Overseen by: Home Department of states
- Agency executive: Additional Director General of Police (Railways)
- Parent agency: State police

Government Railway Police (GRP), or simply Railway Police, are branches of the state police forces in India responsible for maintaining law and order, as well as preventing and detecting crimes in railway premises and running trains. Its duties correspond to those of the district/local police in the areas under their jurisdiction.

It differs from the Railway Protection Force (RPF), which is a security force under the Ministry of Railways, responsible for the security of passengers and railway property. If a crime is detected by the RPF, the case has to be handed over to the respective state GRP.

== Role ==
The role of Government Railway Police is to maintain law and order within railway buildings and track areas, as well as to investigate offences on body and property of passengers in trains and railway premises. They also provide security in trains and railway premises. While the Railway Protection Force gives protection for railway properties, passengers, and passenger areas.

The GRP performs similar functions as the district police within its jurisdiction. Maintaining order include duties such as controlling passenger and vehicle traffic, arresting offenders, removing persons with infectious diseases and beggars, examining empty carriages, the removal of dead bodies of persons died on train or station premises, and moving sick passengers to hospitals. The protection of goods sheds, goods wagons at stations and parcel offices is the duty of the Railway Protection Force.

== History ==
During the British Raj, railways were initially policed by the district police of the respective jurisdictions. However, as railway lines traversed multiple police districts, the need arose for a dedicated railway police. This led to the establishment of separate railway police districts, covering specific sections of railway lines within a province. The Government Railway Police (GRP) was formally established in 1887 in Bengal and Bombay, followed by Punjab two years later. Initially, these railway police districts operated under the supervision of the Deputy Inspector General (DIG) of the Criminal Investigation Departments (CID). This arrangement continued until the mid-1970s when GRPs were placed under the authority of a separate DIG, Inspector General (IG), or Additional Director General (ADG). The functional jurisdiction of the GRP was restricted to railway premises, trains, and tracks.

Since "police" and "public order" fall under the State List in the Seventh Schedule of the Constitution of India, state governments are responsible for crime prevention, detection, registration, investigation, and maintaining law and order on railways within their jurisdictions. This responsibility is executed through the GRP. Although the Ministry of Railways funds 50% of the GRP's expenses, it has no administrative or operational control over the force. This arrangement has occasionally caused friction between the Ministry and state governments. Furthermore, the GRP does not handle the security of goods and freight on railways. To address this gap, the Ministry later established the Railway Protection Force (RPF), which focuses specifically on protecting railway property.

== See also ==
- Railways Act 1989
