= Indian Railway Service of Signal Engineers =

Indian services

- State Emblem of India

- Flag of India

The Indian Railway Service of Signal Engineers (IRSSE) is a central engineering services group A cadre of the Indian railways. The officers of this service are responsible for managing the Signal and Telecommunications Engineering Organization of the Indian Railways.

== Recruitment ==
The incumbents who were Graduates in Engineering used to get selected by the Union Public Services Commission, the apex gazetted recruitment body of the Government of India. In 2020 Railways separated itself from Engineering Services Exam (ESE) and made Indian Railway Management Services (IRMS). Earlier the recruitment used to be through UPSC Engineering Services Exam for Engineers but now after 2 years halt it's through UPSC Civil Services Exam from 2022; an all India written test followed by interview for selected candidates. Earlier Top rankers of Electronics and Telecommunication Engineering only used to get the chance to join IRSSE cadre, but now it has become General Cadre or Cadre for all Civil Services aspirants. They are inducted into the service after One and Half years of rigorous training at Indian Railways Institute of Signal Engineering and Telecommunication (IRISET) at Secunderabad and National Academy of Indian Railways (Formerly Railway Staff College) at Baroda and different parts of India.

The Indian Railway Management Services is merged into Civil Services in 2022 which now on will be conducted by the Union Public Service Commission (UPSC) of India. The UPSC is responsible for recruiting middle and top-level bureaucrats for the Government of India.

== Role and function ==
Functional Role : The service abbreviated as IRSSE has the job of managing the vast Signalling and Telecommunication (S&T) infrastructure of the Indian Railways. This basically is techno-managerial in nature. Signalling principles and operating rules.

The Signalling is a function essential for Safe Train operations and Maximizing the utilization of fixed and moving assets (Train rakes, locos, Track, Over Head Power Equipment etc.) through interlocking, which is the single most important aspect for ensuring safe train running. Telecom on the other hand caters to Safety related, Operational and Administrative communication needs of the Huge IR network. The Copper Cable, Optical Fibre Network and Microwave Links span several Lakh km.

Incumbents of IRSSE are also involved in Construction Projects like New Line, Gauge Conversions, Doubling of Lines in Indian Railways. They can also go on deputations to different Metro Rail Corporations like Delhi Metro, Chennai Metro, Bangalore Metro etc., Rail Vikas Nigam Limited, Railtel Corporation of India Limited, RITES, Dedicated Freight Corridor Corporation of India Limited etc.

General Management: Like all other IR Engineering (IRSE, IRSEE, IRSME) and Civil service Cadres (like IRTS, IRPS and IRAS), the IRSSE has the responsibility of contributing to the General management of railways. In IR, the general management posts are GM (general manager), AGM (Addl. GM), SDGM (Senior Deputy General Manager), CPRO (Chief Public Relations Officer), DGM (Deputy General Manager) etc. at Zonal level and DRM (Divisional Railway Manager), ADRM (Addl. DRM) at Divisional level. They have also to contribute for posts of CSO (Chief Safety Officers), Sr. DSO and Sr. EDPM.

== Organisation ==
APEX LEVEL :The S&T Organization is headed at apex level (i.e. Railway Board, Ministry of Railways) by Member (Infrastructure) ex-officio secretary to Government of India. He is assisted by two Additional Secretary to Government of India rank (equivalent to GM) officers v.i.z Additional Member (Signal) and Additional Member (Tele), Who are in turn assisted by Joint Secretary to Government of India rank officers viz. Advisor (Signal) and several Deputy Secretary to Government of India rank executive directors and directors. S&T Officers may go to general management or ex- cadre posts like AM-IT, AM-Plg etc. The posts of Menmber(Staff)-till date is also ex-cadre in Railways, and an IRSSE may also get to become Member(Staff) also. The posts of CRS and CCRS are also ex-cadre for Technical and Traffic wing, and an IRSSE may opt for becoming CRS or CCRS also at the apex level.

ZONES :The Indian Railways has 17 Zonal Railways with an average Track length of about 4000 km and average staff strength of about 80,000 headed by GMs. The Zonal Organizational structure of Signal Engineers is headed by HAG/SAG grade IRSSE officer designated as PCSTE (Principal Chief Signal & Telecom Engineer) who is assisted by various SAG officers designated as CSE (Chief Signal Engineer), CCE (Chief Communication Engineer), CSTE (Planning), CSTE(Projects) and CSTE(Construction) and SG/JAG, SS & JS grade officers designated as Dy CSTEs, SSTEs and ADSTEs. In ex-cadre establishment, the General Manager, Addl.GM, SDGM, Secretary, CPRO posts are also ex-cadre, and an IRSSE Engineer may occupy these posts also. The post of CSO(chief Safety Officer) has also been made ex-cader for Technical and Traffic Officers in Indian Railways, and on-time, two of the posts of CSO in two Zonal Railways are for S&T cadre. Zones do have posts of CM(IT), DyCM(IT) and SrEDPM, looking after the IT functions of respective zones, and S&T have a fair share in these posts now. In SECR, newly formed Zone, Lokesh Vishnoi, an IRSSE-1992 was posted as SrEDPM and DyCM(IT) totaling a tenure of 7+ years, and he is praised for establishing the Zone-wide network, with implementing all known MIS at that time, and further, in his next tenure as DyCM(IT), upgrading them to the then latest versions of Oracle DB again. His interview was published on ORACLE's website, and further, he collected multiple awards by the GM/SECR, by IE(India) headed PES/R, and multiple IT awards by leading IT societies of India.

DIVISIONS : Each Zone is divided into 3-7 Divisions each with an average track length of about 1000 km and staff strength of about 15000 headed overall by DRM (Divisional Railway Manager).

At this Level the Signal and Telecomm Department is Headed by a JAG/SG grade IRSSE officer designated as Sr.DSTE (Senior Divisional Signal & Telecom Engineer) who is in turn assisted by SS & JS grade officers designated as DSTE (Divisional Signal & Telecom Engineer) and ADSTE (Assistant Divisional Signal & Telecom Engineer). An IRSSE officer starts his career as an ADSTE who is the Team leader of about 100-200 staff with jurisdiction of around 200 km and can rise up to the level of General Manager in a Railway Zone or Member (Signal & Telecom) in Railway Board. The post of safety officers also has been made ex-cadre for technical and traffic officers in Indian Railways, and almost every division shall have a post of DSO or ADSO/S&T, with at-least one division in each zone having a SrDSO, belonging to S&T.

== Hierarchy ==
Grade	Designation in the field	Designation in Headquarters	Basic pay
Apex Scale (Pay level 17)	Nil	Chairman & CEO, Railway Board Secretary	₹225,000 (US$2,300)
Higher Administrative Grade (+) (Pay level 16)	General Manager Additional Secretary	Member (Signal & Telecom), Railway Board	₹205,400 (US$2,100)—₹224,400 (US$2,300)
Higher Administrative Grade (Pay level 15)	Principal Chief Signal & Telecom Engineer	Additional Member, Railway Board Additional Secretary	₹182,200 (US$1,900)—₹224,100 (US$2,300)
Senior Administrative Grade (Pay level 14)	Chief Signal & Telecom Engineer	Executive Director Joint Secretary	₹144,200 (US$1,500)—₹218,200 (US$2,300)
Junior Administrative Grade (Functional) (Pay level 13)	Senior Divisional Signal & Telecom Engineer / Deputy Chief Signal & Telecom Engineer	Director	₹123,100 (US$1,300)—₹215,900 (US$2,200)
Senior Time Scale (Non Functional) (Pay level 12)	Deputy Chief Signal & Telecom Engineer	Joint Director Deputy Secretary	₹78,800 (US$820)—₹209,200 (US$2,200)
Senior Time Scale (Pay level 11)	Divisional Signal & Telecom Engineer	Deputy Director Under Secretary	₹67,700 (US$700)—₹208,700 (US$2,200)
Junior Time Scale (Pay level 10)	Assistant Divisional Signal & Telecom Engineer	Assistant Director Assistant Secretary	₹56,100 (US$580)—₹177,500 (US$1,800)

== Namesake ==
The IRSSE is not to be confused with the IRSE or Indian Railway Service of Engineers.

== Training ==
The initial and refresher training of all incumbents of IRSSE is done at Indian Railways Institute of Signal Engineering and Telecommunications, Secunderabad.
