= Indian Railways Institute of Signal Engineering and Telecommunications =

Organisation

- Established: 1958
- Faculty: 19
- Location: Secunderabad, Telangana, India
- Website: IRISET

The Indian Railways Institute of Signal Engineering and Telecommunications (IRISET) is a training institute based in Secunderabad, Telangana, India, operated by the Ministry of Railways under Indian Railways. Established in 1958, it trains supervisors and officers of Indian Railways in railway signalling and telecommunication, as well as officials from foreign railways.

== Overview ==
In its first year, the institute focused on training apprentice junior engineers (JE) in signalling and telecommunications. Following rapid developments in the field, it expanded to offer specialised technical training in signal engineering, telecommunications technology, electronics, and information technology for officers and staff of the signal and telecommunications department, as well as training facilities for foreign nationals.

== Sister organizations ==
IRISET is one of the Centralised Training Institutes of Indian Railways that share officer training duties. The other institutes include:

- Indian Railways Institute of Civil Engineering, Pune – for civil engineers
- Indian Railways Institute of Electrical Engineering, Nashik – for electrical engineers
- Indian Railways Institute of Mechanical and Electrical Engineering, Jamalpur – for mechanical engineers
- RPF Academy, Lucknow – for officers of the Railway Protection Force
- National Academy of Indian Railways, Vadodara (formerly Railway Staff College) – apex training institute for officers across departments
