= Indian Railway Personnel Service =

Indian civil service focused on railways

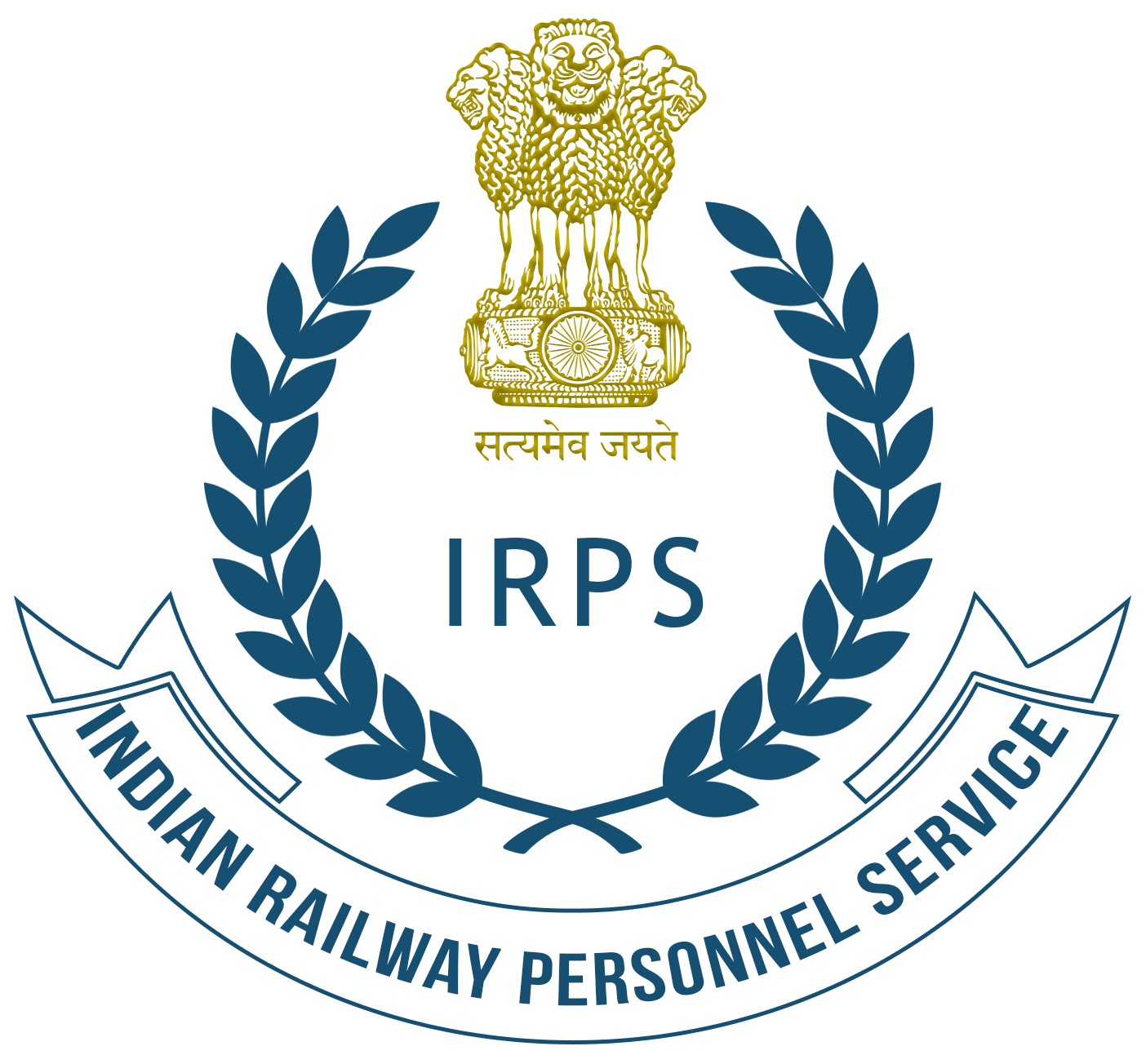

Service Overview
- Abbreviation: IRPS
- Formed: 1980
- Headquarters: Rail Bhavan; New Delhi
- Country: India
- Training Academy: National Academy of Indian Railways (Vadodara)
- Controlling Authority: Ministry of Railways, Government of India
- Cadre Size: 418

Service Chief
- Director General (Human Resource), Railway Board: Aruna Nayar IRMS

Head of the Civil Services
- Cabinet Secretary: T. V. Somanathan, IAS

The Indian Railway Personnel Service (IRPS) is a Group 'A' Central Civil Service cadre of the Government of India. The central civil servants of this service are responsible for managing the human resources of the Indian Railways and welfare of railway employees and their families. Railways has a work force of about 1.4 million employees. It is the only civil service of its kind in India and it creates a cadre of central civil servants specialized in human resource management in government of India. The total sanctioned strength of the service is '478' after cadre restructuring orders on 09.03.2019.

== Recruitment ==
50% vacancies in the initial recruitment grade of the Indian Railways Personnel Service (IRPS) Railway office are filled up through the UPSC Civil Service Examination held every year while remaining vacancies are filled up by promotion of Group 'B' officers of feeder cadres through selection made by UPSC.The first direct recruitment to the cadre was done by UPSC in the year 1980. Prior to that some officers of sister cadres like Railway Board Secretariat Service had joined the service on option basis. After selection, the IRPS probationers undergo general foundation training at one of the training academies, that is, Lal Bahadur Shastri National Academy of Administration (LBSNAA), RCVP Noronha Academy of Administration at Bhopal and Dr. Marri Chenna Reddy Human Resource Development Institute of Telangana at Hyderabad. Following this they go for the Railway Foundation Course at National Academy of Indian Railways, Vadodara.

== Role and function ==
IRPS officers mean the Establishment Directorate and the Personnel department of the Ministry of Railways, at Zonal railway and divisional levels including the railway production units and workshops. While other services in the railway are concerned with the operational or material management of the train, the Personnel Service handles the human resource aspect.

Railway is one of the model employers with a large number of welfare measures being implemented to look after the staff and their families. IRPS officer is also the welfare officer in the railways.

- Being responsible for the service, as well as personal issues of the employees, IRPS officer works in close coordination with all other departments in the railways by functioning as consultant and advisor.

At the apex level of the Ministry of Railways, Member Staff is the highest level post, who is ex-officio Secretary to Government of India.Currently he is assisted by Director General (Personnel) and two Additional members, Additional Member (Staff) and Additional Member (Industrial Relations), who are in the rank of Additional Secretary to Government of India.Below them are a group of Principal Executive Directors, Directors, Joint Directors and Deputy Directors who work at Railway Board level who are either drawn from the service or from the Railway Board Secretariat Service.

Similarly at the 16 Zonal Railway level the Personnel Department is headed by a Principal Chief Personnel Officer (PCPO). PCPOs are also posted in the major production units/factories of Indian Railways. The role of Personnel Department as it is called all over encompasses all those which are in any Human Resources Management department of any organisation including those of dealing with Labour Relations and Labour Legislations.
