= Indian Railways Track Machine Training Centre =

Indian trade school

Indian Railways Track Machine Training Centre (IRTMTC) is one of the three institutions in the world that provide training in track machines, the other two being in Linz, Austria and Watford, UK. It was established in Subedarganj, Allahabad in 1984 to provide track machine training in India. The training centre presently imparts training to officers and staff of Indian Railways and Railway Public-sector undertakings (PSU) viz. RITES, IRCON, KRCL etc. It is managed as a department under North Central Railway (NCR) under Indian Railways, Government Of India. It provides technical training to the different Railway departments specially to Track Machine and PWay (permanent way).
