= Indian Railway Stores Service =

Engineering service of the Government of India

- Motto: दक्षता गुणवत्ता समयबद्धता (Hindi) "Efficiency Quality & Timeliness"

Service overview
- Founded: 1936; 90 years ago
- Country: India
- Training Institute: National Academy of Indian Railways (NAIR), Vadodara, Gujarat
- Cadre controlling authority: Member (Traction & Rolling Stock), Ministry of Railways, Government of India
- Minister responsible: Ashwini Vaishnaw, Minister of Railways, Communication and IT
- Legal personality: Governmental; Engineering
- Duties: Supply Chain Management; Goods and Services Procurement; Inventory Control
- Cadre strength: 542 members
- Selection: Engineering Services Examination (UPSC)
- Association: IRSS Officers Association
- Additional Member Railway Stores: Rajeev Kumar, IRSS
- Notable Alumni: A.K. Mittal (former CRB), R. Shrinivasan, Virendra Raj Mehta, Vinay Sharma, Girish Bhatnagar.

The Indian Railway Stores Service (IRSS) is one of the Group A central engineering services of the Government of India. The officers of this service are procurement and logistics specialists and involvement in supply contract management over Indian Railways. They are responsible for inspection, receipt, storage and issue and distribution of spares, raw materials, tools and plant and machinery. This includes planning of logistics for the transportation of material from and within various railways as well as the planners and maintainers of the intelligent warehousing with automated storage and retrieval systems on the Indian Railways. The IRSS officers undergo training at National Academy of Indian Railways (NAIR) for a period of 18 months which includes two months certification course at IIM Khozikhode and a foreign training.

== Recruitment & Job responsibility of IRSS ==
IRSS Officers man the senior posts of stores department and also general administrative posts of Indian Railways. The members of this group A service are recruited through the Engineering Services Examination conducted annually by the Union Public Service Commission The basic qualification for appearing in this examination is a degree in engineering and all the members belonging to this service are engineers. The Department of Personnel and Training DOPT defines it as a Technical Service. The total sanctioned strength of cadre is 542. The young officer after being intensively trained for 18 months under the guidance of National Academy of Indian Railways is posted as AMM in junior scale. The officer can rise up to chairman railway board (ex officio principal secretary to GOI). In normal course all officers rise up to the level of Additional Secretary to GOI. At the level of Railway Board the service is headed by Member (Material Management), ex-officio secretary to GOI. IRSS cadre not only caters to stores departments but contribute significantly to the general administration of Indian Railways in particular and the Government of India in general. The various ex-cadre posts held by officers of service are Chairman of Railway Board, General Manager, Divisional Railway Manager, Additional Divisional Railway Manager and Chairman of the Railway Recruitment Board. Many officers are also working on deputation to various ministries of Government of India under Central Staffing Scheme.

Indian Railway Stores Service (IRSS) is one of the eight organized services of Indian Railways. The IRSS cadre is responsible for forecasting, planning, procurement of material, logistics management, and warehousing of Indian Railway's assets. It is also responsible for giving material support to production of railway coaches, locomotives, and railway wagons. Realization of revenue by selling of scrap is another major function of the Stores Department. This is done by means of auctions, tender sale, and staff sales. Recently all cadres of Indian Railways has been merged and IRSS functions to be carried out by Indian Railway Management Service, IRMS sub cadre stores, IRMS(stores).

== Evolution of purchase function in Indian Railways ==
At the time of independence, Indian Railways was running primarily on steam locomotives. Most of the components required for steam locomotives were made in workshops, and the components which were to be purchased, were very few. The stores requirements for track, signaling, C&W and other general items were also inadequate. As, at that time, the industrialization of country had just started, a substantial number of stores were to be imported mainly through India Supply Mission. The function of the stores department, at that time, was limited and mainly centered on storekeeping.

However, with the start of dieselisation in the 1950s and speeding up of electrification from the 1960s, the face of railways started changing. Electric locomotives, compared to steam locomotives, required more items that were sophisticated and had to be purchased. It was mainly with dieselisation and electrification, that the purchase function of railways started evolving though other changing areas, e.g. signaling, production of coaches, track laying, and maintenance activity. Apart from more purchase items, the issues such as quality and reliability of items and the firms who were supplying them also became relevant as diesel and electric locomotives required sophisticated items for which credentials and capabilities of vendors needed to be pre-assessed. Activity of approval and registration of firms thus started. As the railway system was expanding, the funds became scarce and there was an urgent need to keep inventories at optimum levels so that capital could be used elsewhere, making inventory control important. Similarly the scrap sales function also became more and more important over the years.

Purchasing and its allied activities became complex as the traffic and train services increased in number and size. Purchase activity, which was clerical in nature in earlier days, had to respond to the needs of time become professional. The 1980s and 1990s saw more types of rolling stocks and improved maintenance practices. The railway network as measured by track km remained more or less the same, the increase in traffic and customer expectation put severe constraints on all the resources like track, rolling stock sheds, and workshops. Less time became available for maintenance. From the mid-1990s, safe running of trains emerged as an important issue and compared to previous decades, and more items became essential for safe operation of trains. All these issues put severe strain on railways purchasing system.

Over the years, Indian Railways' purchases have gone manifold both in terms of value and number of items. The technical, industrial, and commercial scenario of the country has also changed significantly. There are now more standards, specifications, and accrediting bodies, and more central, state and local laws. Purchasing in today's world is done in a complex environment.

The members of the IRSS on the Indian Railways are the procurement and logistics specialists responsible for procurement of various goods and services to the tune of Rs. 25000 Crores annually, and disposal of scrap to the tune of Rs. 3000 Crores per annum in the form of auction and sale of electric and diesel locomotives, old coaches and wagons, and old bridge structures along with the rails released from the gauge conversion activities. (These figures are from the latest IR-Yearbook)

They also manage huge warehouses attached with the major coaching and wagon workshops as well as the electric and diesel locomotive sheds.

They are the logistics managers for transportation of material through the roadways.

== Organization ==
The department is organized in three tiers. The top tier is at the Railway Board level, the second tier at the Zonal Railway level and the third tier at the divisional or the district level.

At the apex level, department is headed by Member (Traction and Rolling Stock) who is the head of Mechanical, Electrical and Stores cadre of Indian Railways. Member (Traction and Rolling Stock) is in turn assisted by Additional Member (Railway Stores), Principal Executive Director/s, Executive Directors and Directors.

At the zonal levels, the principal head of the department is the Principal Chief Materials Manager(PCMM). The PCMM is assisted by Chief Materials Managers(CMMs). These CMMs in turn have various Dy. Chief Materials Managers, and in turn, they are assisted by the Senior Materials Managers and the Assistant Materials Managers. The Stores department manages about 200 warehouses that feed into the repair workshops and maintenance sheds. The Warehouses called depots headed by a Depot Officer. Depots attached to workshops are headed by Dy. CMMs, and electric and diesel locomotive sheds headed by SMMs. These depots directly reports to PCMM. Divisional setup is headed by Sr. DMMs who report to Divisional Railway Managers. Sr. DMMs are responsible for material management at divisional level by catering needs to others branches of divisions. They are responsible for coordination of scrap arising out of division in close association with the Engineering Department. Sr. DMMs also do uniform management for various grades of running staff such as guards, TTE, station masters.

== Objectives of the department for the coming years ==
Recent policy decisions have been made by the Ministry of Railways for expanding and improving the conditions of railway infrastructure, amenities on trains, railway stations, and other railway premises for passengers and other railway users. As a result, phenomenal growth has taken place in all the activities including those of the Stores department. Since economic liberalization started in the early 1990s, the pace of growth has increased substantially and Indian Railways has set ambitious targets for the Eleventh Five-Year Plan.

Scientific materials and supply chain management have emerged in recent years as important managerial functions. A systematic application of the tools and techniques of materials management can achieve considerable saving in costs and increase in productivity. No management can afford to ignore these concepts and techniques in an environment marked by liberalization, globalization, enhanced competition, and rapid progress in technology, particularly in the areas of automation and computerization.

The objective is to increasingly apply the modern concepts related to integrated materials management, strategic and operational aspects of outsourcing and procurement, the interface of materials management and supply chain management. The objective is also to adopt the latest techniques of cost control and optimization by leveraging information technology tools for development and implementation of an efficient materials management system in the organization. It is needless to say that all is to be done in public procurement platforms in most economic manner.

The technical, industrial and commercial scenario of the country has also changed significantly. There are now more standards, specifications, accrediting bodies and also more central, state and local laws. Even organizations much smaller in size and scope than Railways appoint persons expert in techno-commercial areas like taxation, port clearance, law and accountancy. The officers manning the cadre will be encouraged to take special interest and become specialist in one of the areas of scientific materials management, some of which are given below-

- Strategic procurement management
- International purchasing
- Inventory management – designing and implementing inventory systems
- Logistics management
- Management information system
- Financial aspects of materials management
- Sales and Auction management
- Value engineering

The market in India has also undergone tremendous change ever since the liberalization process was initiated in the early 1990s. The boundaries between the domestic and global market have become thin and transparent. A number of global players and multi-nationals have entered the Indian market and are keen to join hands with Indian Railways. In order to take advantage of market conditions, Indian Railways has to make major changes in their rules, procedures, and methodology of procurement, and the methodology of disposal of non-performing assets and unserviceable materials. For example, green procurement, e-procurement, e-payments, reverse auction, and eco-friendly disposal systems have to be not only introduced early but implemented with speed and on a sustainable basis.

E-Procurement: since 2009, Indian Railways Stores Service achieved the distinction of going 100% digital on tendering and procurement through web based online process using PKI and digital signatures completing all 26 railway units (both zonal & P.U.s). This is the biggest web-based procurement portal in Asia using single window function for all procurements by Indian Railways, crossing over two Lakh online tenders through fully secured website www.ireps.gov.in . E-Auction: IRSS successfully achieved & adopted Online E-Auction process since May 2013, crossing E-Auction Revenue over 1000 CR using full secured single window e-Auction process, providing online net banking and payment, enabling purchasers across India to participate online.
