= Railway Board Secretariat Service =

The Railway Board Secretariat Service (RBSS) (हिंदी : रेलवे बोर्ड सचिवालय सेवा) is a central civil service in the Secretariat of the Ministry of Railways (Railway Board) of the Union Government of India.

== Origin ==
Railway Board Secretariat Service was constituted with effect from 1.12.1954 under the Railway Board Secretariat (Re-organisation and reinforcement) Scheme. The model followed in setting up the service was the Central Secretariat Service which had been re-organised under the Central Secretariat (Re-organisation and re-inforcement) Scheme, framed by the Ministry of Home Affairs, with a view to strengthen the secretariat structure of other Ministries of Government of India. The Railway Board Secretariat (Re-organisation and re-inforcement) Scheme was later codified in the form of statutory rules by promulgating the Railway Board Secretariat Service Rules, 1969 on the basis of Central Secretariat Service Rules, 1962.

== Organisational structure ==
The headquarters organisation of Government of India comprises a number of Secretaries of the Ministries and Departments. Most of the middle-level posts and a few administrative posts at the senior level in the Secretariat of these Ministries and Departments are staffed by the officers of various Secretariat Services. Such posts in the Ministry of Railways (Railway Board) are held by the officers of Railway Board Secretariat Service. In various Ministries other than Ministry of Railways, Ministry of Defense and Ministry of External Affairs, such posts are held by the officers of Central Secretariat Service (CSS), Armed Forces Headquarter Civil Service (AFHQCS) and Indian Foreign Service (B) officers respectively. All these services are treated as part of Central Civil Services. Railway Board Secretariat Service (RBSS) was constituted on the pattern of CSS and various changes made in the composition of CSS in the year 2004-2005 as a consequence of first cadre restructuring of CSS have also been adopted in RBSS. Ministry of Railways (Railway Board) functions as a Ministry of Government of India as well as Technical Headquarter of a vast network of Indian Railways.

The organisational hierarchy of the above Secretariat Services normally comprises the following levels / grades.

Level	Pay Band and Grade Pay (6th Pay Commission)	Level in the Pay Matrix (7th Pay Commission)
Jt. Secy. / Executive Director (SAG)	10000 (PB4)	L14
Director /Sr.Selection Grade	8700 (PB4)	L13
Dy Secretary / Jt.Director (JAG /Selection Grade)	7600 (PB3)	L12
Under Secretary /Dy.Director (Sr.Scale Group A)	6600 (PB3)	L11
Section Officer / Group B Gaz.	4800 (initial) (PB2) 5400 in PB3 (After 4 years service)(PB3)	L 8 L10
Assistant SO /Group B Non-gaz.	4600 (PB2)	L 7

Railway Board Secretariat Service also has the cadre post at the level of Higher Administrative Grade (HAG) in scale Rs.67000-79000 (L15) which was created based on recommendations of 5th Central Pay Commission.

Above posts have been granted normal revised pay structure comprising the Pay Levels in the Pay Matrix after implementation of recommendations of 7th Central Pay Commission on the Indian Railways.

The Railway Board Secretariat Service has 1 HAG (L15), 5 SAG (L14), 25 Director ( L13), 39 JAG (L12) and 139 Senior Scale (Group A) posts after second cadre restructuring of the service.

== Headquarters ==
Most of the officers of Railway Board Secretariat Service are posted in New Delhi at Headquarter of Ministry of Railways (Railway Board) at Rail Bhavan. A few directorates like Health directorate and Pay Commission directorates are, however, located at Railway Board office in DFCCIL premises at 3rd Floor at Supreme Court metro station complex adjacent to Supreme Court of India.

== Civil list of officers ==
The Civil List of various Gazetted officers of Railway Board Secretariat Service (RBSS) is published by the Ministry of Railways as part of Classified List of Gazetted Establishment of Indian Railways in chapter Railway Board. The directory of officers of Railway Board is available on the website of Ministry of Railways.

== Recruitment and promotion ==
The recruitment and promotion to various grades of RBSS are governed by Railway Board Secretariat Service Rules, 1969 notified on 11 Oct 1969 and a number of modifications and amendments made to the principle rules thereafter last being through Railway Board Secretariat Service (Amendment) Rules, 2004 notified in December 2004. Up to the year 2003, direct recruitment to the 20% posts in the Section Officers Grade of Railway Board Secretariat Service (RBSS) was made through the Civil Services Examination held by Union Public Service Commission. Based on cadre restructuring of RBSS as per cadre registration of CSS undertaken in 2004-05, the vacancies in the Grade of Section Officer of Railway Board Secretariat Service are filled up 50% by Combined SO Grade Limited Departmental Competitive Examination organised annually by Union Public Service Commission and 50% by promotion of Asst. Section Officers having 8 years of Service in the Grade. The 75% vacancies in the Grade of Asst. Section Officer of RBSS are filled up through SSC Combined Graduate Level Examination held by Staff Selection Commission. The posts in the Grade of Under Secretary are filled up through Departmental Promotion Committee (DPC) proceedings held by Union Public Service Commission (UPSC) by a promotion of officers in Section Officers' Grade with 8 years service. Promotion to the level of Joint Secretary and Advisor are made through the Appointments Committee of the Cabinet (ACC Proceedings). The direct recruits to the service entering at the level of Assistant Section Officer are imparted training at Institute of Secretariat Training and Management.

The officers of Railway Board Secretariat Service used to constitute feeder categories for filling up the posts Indian Railway Personnel Service in its earlier days. Their services are also often taken by various Railway undertakings and corporations on deputation basis.

== Duties, responsibilities and sphere of work ==
The service serves as the backbone of administrative work and provides permanent bureaucracy and functionary staff in the Ministry of Railways. The officers of the Service handle policy formulation, execution and review in the assigned sphere of responsibilities. They also handle Parliament questions, court cases and RTI matters on such issues. Most of the Central Public Information Officers and Asstt. Public Information Officers in the Ministry of Railways are from RBSS.

The officers of Railway Board Secretariat Service are posted in various directorates of Ministry of Railways along with the officers drawn from Zonal Railways on deputation. The officers drawn from various Group A organised Railway services are posted in Railway Board for a fixed tenure and work together with the Railway Board Secretariat Service officers who provide continuity of policy dealt by the directorate. Some of these directorates are as mentioned below:

Accounts, Civil Engineering, Coaching, Computer and Information Systems, Corporate Co-ordination, Economics, Efficiency & Research, Electrical Engineering, Establishment, Finance, Finance (Budget), Finance (Expenditure), Health, Infrastructure, Land and Amenities, Legal, LRDSS, Management Services, Mechanical Engg., Mech.Engg.(PU&W), Pay Commission, Planning, Heritage, Public Relation, Environment Management, Railway Sports Promotion Board, Safety, Secretary Branches, Security (RPF), Signal, Statistics and Economics, Stores, Telecommunication, Track, Traffic Commercial, Traffic Transportation, Tourism & Catering, Vigilance, Works, Works Planning, High Power Committee, High Level Committee for Railway Restructuring, Accounting Reforms, Passengers Amenities Committee.

Above directorates comprise a number of sections and branches each having assigned list of subjects dealt by them.

Apart from the above, the RBSS Officers are also posted in the secretariat of Ministers of Railways.
