= National Academy of Indian Railways =

Training institute in Vadodara, India

Coordinates: 22.2806°N 73.2002°E

- Official Emblem of Indian Railways
- Established: 1930; 96 years ago
- Mission: Civil Service Training; Engineering Training; Medical Training
- Head: Indian Railways
- Location: Vadodara
- Interactive map of National Academy of Indian Railways
- Website: https://nair.indianrailways.gov.in/

The National Academy of Indian Railways (NAIR), Vadodara formerly Railway Staff College and historically the Pratap Vilas Palace, is a Centralised civil service, engineering and medical training institute for Civil Service, Engineering and Medical Officers of Indian Railway Personnel Service, Indian Railway Stores Service and Indian Railway Medical Services cadre headed by a Director General and staffed by a faculty of experienced Railway Managers and Experts. Starting with the initial training of Officers Trainees inducted as Central Civil Services, Engineering and Medical professionals that form the backbone of Indian Railways, the Academy also conducts, mid-service mandatory or theme based in service Management Courses for all Officers of IR and courses for Officers of other Group A Central Services, Public Sector and Foreign Railways. The Academy is housed in the sprawling 55 acres campus of the Pratap Vilas Palace at Lalbaug, Vadodara.

== History ==
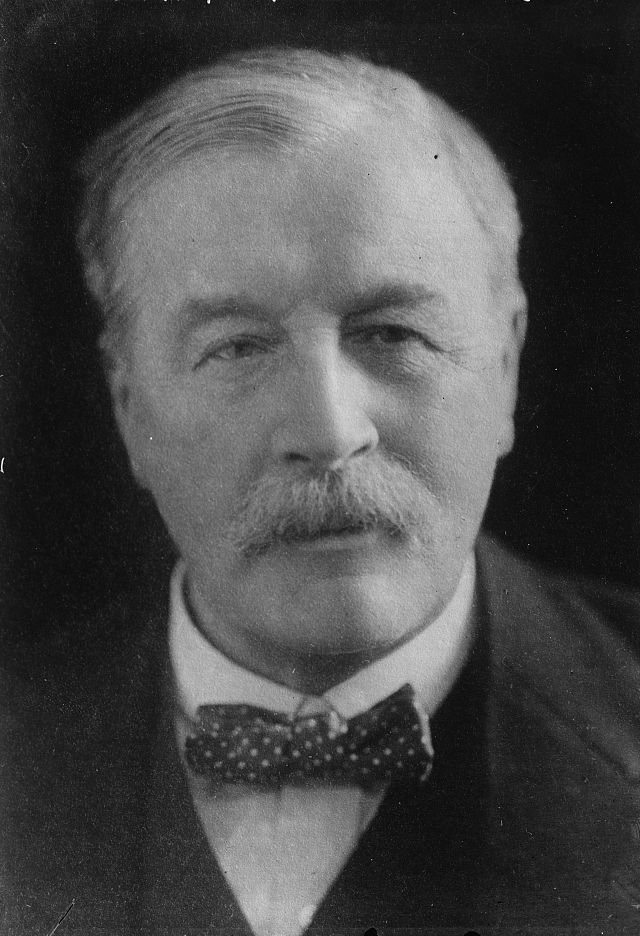
Sir William Acworth

The Indian Railway Committee was constituted in 1920, under the chairmanship of Sir William Mitchell Acworth, with 10 members including 3 Indians viz. V. S. Srinivasa Sastri (Elected Member of the Viceroy's Legislative Council), Purshottam Das Thakurdas (representing Indian Commercial Interests) and Sir Rajendra Nath Mookerjee. The committee recommended setting up a Railway Staff College which came up at Dehradun but soon closed down. Later the Indian Military Academy IMA came up on the same campus.

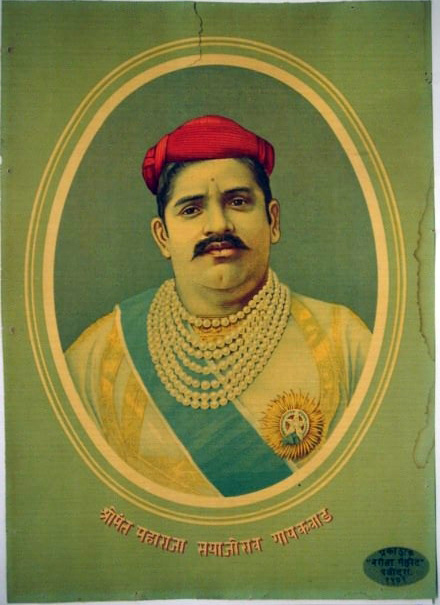
Maharaja Sayaji Rao III of Baroda

The Railway Staff College was reestablished in 1952 at Pratap Vilas Palace Vadodara built by Maharaja Sayaji Rao for his eldest son Fatehsingh Rao. The Palace is adorned by exquisite carvings. Its construction was started on 15 February 1908 in the year when the last ruler of Baroda State, Pratapsingh Rao was born and his father Fatehsingh Rao died. Named after Pratapsingh Rao, the palace was designed in the renaissance style by Charles F. Stevens, son of F.W. Stevens, the British architect who designed the Victoria Terminus in Mumbai. The palace complex is built in 55 acres (220,000 m^{2}) of well laid out gardens and wooded land enlivened by the calls of peacocks and migratory birds and adorned by exquisite carvings of creepers, flowers, leaves, birds and animals and noted for its architectural grandeur highlighted with columns and arches. The palace, completed in 1914, also known as Lalbaugh Palace or Prince's Palace, was leased by the then Bombay Government on 31 January 1949 and given to the Railways for their use who subsequently purchased the property on 6 January 1964 for Rs 24,38,271.

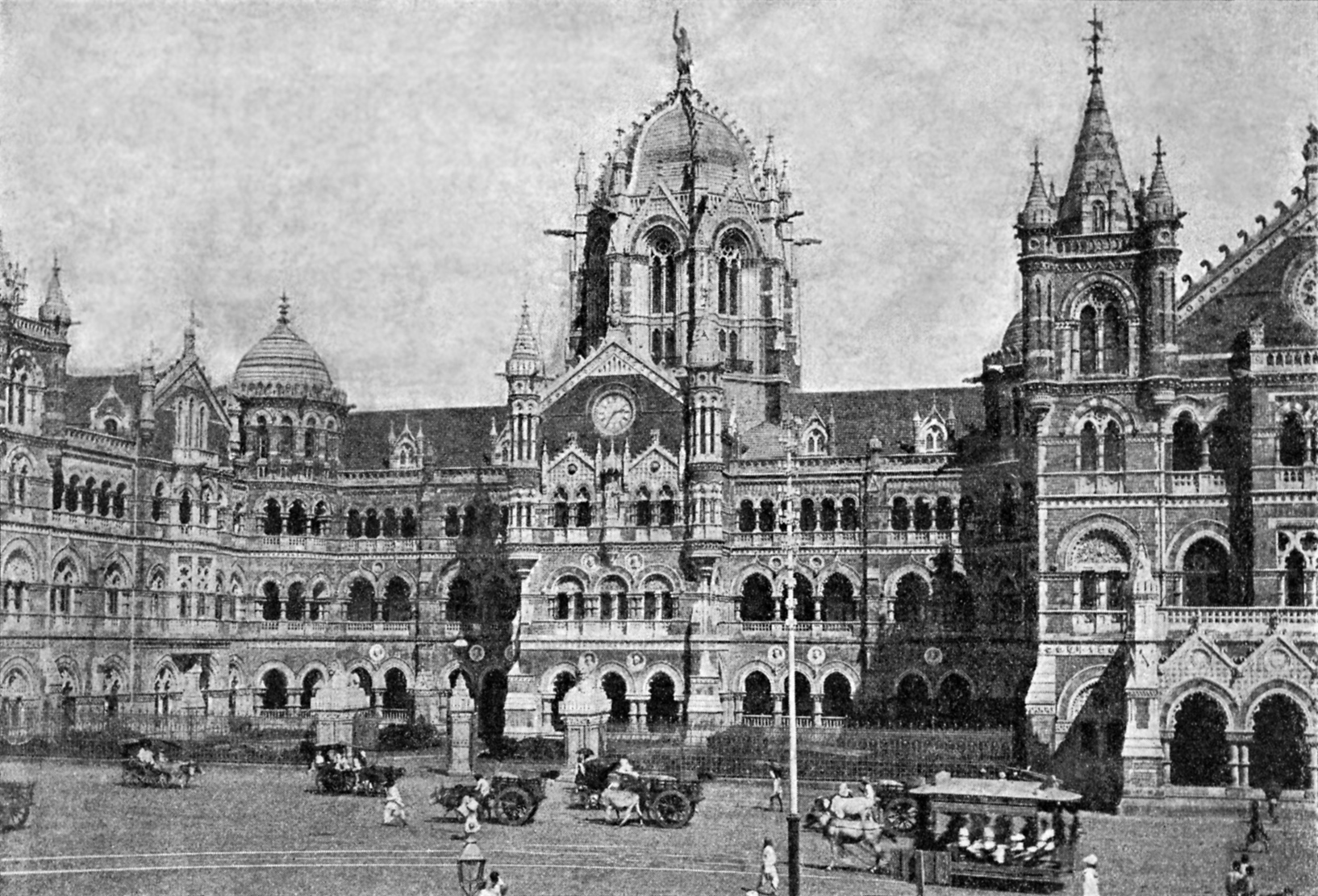
Chatrapati Shivaji Terminus Mumbai designed By F. W Stevens

== Courses ==
Indian Railways employs over 1.25 million personnel including 15,000 group ‘A’ and group ‘B’ officers. The Academy is the apex institution for Management Training of all Railway Officers and Centralised & Professional Training for Officers of Accounts, Personnel, Stores and Medical departments including the centralized training of newly recruited IRAS, IRPS, IRSS and IRHS (erstwhile IRMS) Trainee officers.

Nearly 100 courses for about 3800 officer trainees are planned in 2016. 120 courses were conducted in 2015.

Professional Training of all officers including centralized training of the Officer Trainees of Civil, Electrical, Mechanical, Signal & Telecom Engineering, Traffic Transportation & Commercial Departments and the Railway Protection Force of Indian Railways is conducted at Seven other Centralised Training Institutes (CTIs) viz,

- IRICEN-Indian Railways Institute of Civil Engineering, Pune
- IRISET-Indian Railways Institute of Signal and Telecommunications Engineering, Secunderabad
- IRIMEE-Indian Railways Institute of Mechanical and Electrical Engineering, Jamalpur
- IRIEEN-Indian Railways Institute of Electrical Engineering, Nasik
- IRITM-Indian Railways Institute of Transportation Management, Lucknow
- Jagjivan Ram Railway Protection Force Academy Lucknow
- Centralized Training Academy For Railway Accounts Secunderabad.

The training of non-gazetted staff is conducted at 55 Main Training Centers and 222 Other Training Centers (i.e., Area Training Centers, Basic Training Centers, Divisional Training Centers, Multi Disciplinary Training Centers etc.

== The Academy ==
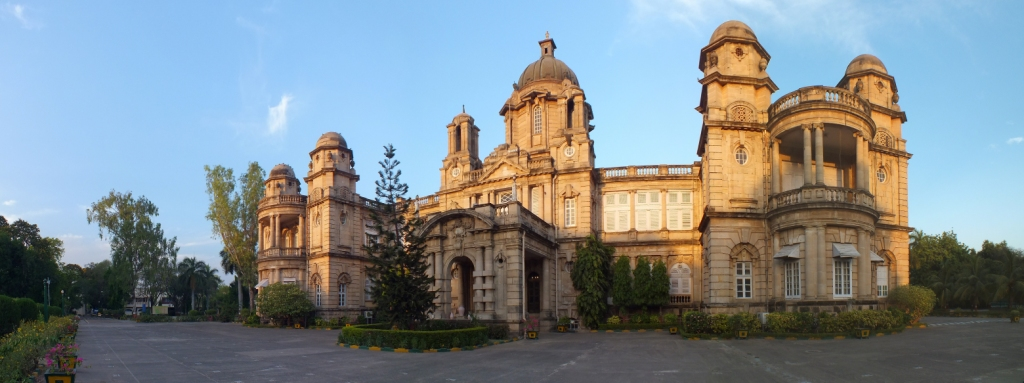
Pratap Vilas Palace

Shri S.P.S Chauhan is the current Director General of the Academy. The faculty comprises 24 experts drawn from various disciplines i.e., Finance, HR, Management, Engineering, Law, Safety, Security, Medicine, Rajbhasha etc.

Faculty of the Academy- See Academy website

The Academy along with all 7 other CTIs function under the administrative control of the Ministry of Railways (Railway Board).

== Training programmes ==
=== Centralized Training for IRAS, IRSS, IRPS & IRHS ===
The Academy is the ‘Centralised Training Institute’, for Officer Trainees assigned to ‘Indian Railway Accounts Service’, Indian Railway Personnel Service’, ‘Indian Railway Stores Service’ and Indian Railway Medical Service’ by UPSC. Training includes class room inputs, field training and visits to other CTIs. Officer Trainees of IRAS also attend short term Professional modules at National Academy of Audit and Accounts, Shimla, National Institute of Financial Management, Faridabad, National Academy of Direct Taxes Nagpur and Centralized Training Academy For Railway Accounts (C-TARA) Secunderabad, for discipline specific modules.

=== Foundation & Induction Programmes for Group A and B Officers ===
It is a combined programme for Officer Trainees of nine Organized Central Group A Civil & Engineering Services that are responsible for managing Indian Railways and the foundation and induction courses for them. In the case of Officer Trainees of the Indian Railway Medical Service (IRMS), the Organised Central Group A Medical Service, which manages the health services on the Indian Railways network, shorter Foundation and Induction programmes are conducted separately. In order to provide an overview of the railways to recently promoted Group 'B' officers of all departments, the Railways Foundation Programmes are offered. For officers of the Stores, Accounts, and Personnel departments, induction programmes are held as part of their induction process. During the induction courses, Group B officers from other departments attend induction courses held at their respective CTIs.

==== Mid Service Training ====
Offered in two formats:

1. General inputs of interest to all Managers at various stages in their career.
2. Function or subject specific inputs only to relevant set of Managers.

==== Special Courses ====
Theme based short term courses on various topics such as Right to Information Act, Discipline & Appeal Rules, Vigilance, Labour Laws, Railway Safety, Hospital Management, Information Technology are conducted throughout the year.

==== BIMSTEC Training Program ====
An International Programme on ‘Costing & Pricing of Rail Transport Services’ is conducted every year for Executives of Railways and other Transport sectors from BIMSTEC & Mekong-Ganga Cooperation and allied countries (Bangladesh, Bhutan, Cambodia, Indonesia, Malaysia, Myanmar, Nepal, Pakistan, Sri Lanka, Thailand, and Vietnam and India).

== Seminars/Workshops ==
Seminars/Workshops conducted in the past year Interactive Workshops on Project Management through Alternate Financing, Recruitment procedures for RRB Chairpersons, Good Governance Code for Station Managers Seminars on Enhancing Productivity on IR through IT Applications, Make in India for the World – Realizing export potential of Railway Products & services, and ‘Startups’

== Auditorium ==
Seminars, conferences, mock drill sessions, films, cultural functions etc. are organized regularly in the 250 seat auditorium known as ‘Sardar Patel Sabhagriha’.

== Library ==
The library at has about 53,000 titles on transport, economics, rail transport, psychology, management, law, finance, engineering, computer science, literature and more than 100 journals & government publications are subscribed including 5 e-Journals. The database of the library is available at NIC's (National Informatics Centre) e-Granthalaya portal in a cluster with four other CTIs’ (IRICEN, IRISET, IRIEEN, IRITM and RDSO. A knowledge portal has been built to aggregate most of the available knowledge on Indian Railways by linking websites, documents etc. The website of the Academy nair.indianrailways.gov.in hosts important information like tenders, information for Guest officers, training schedule, 2016- Training Calendar of NAIR.

== Model Room ==
The Academy has a well equipped model room displaying various types of train operating and signaling systems in use on Indian Railways. Trainee Officers get a feel of practical train operations by running working models of trains under a simulated hands-on environment. Model room has working models of route relay interlocking, auxiliary warning system, automatic block signaling, train activated warning at level crossings, block proving by axle counters, 4 aspects automatic signal & data Logger etc. Souvenirs from the National Rail Museum New Delhi are displayed and are also available for sale to trainees.

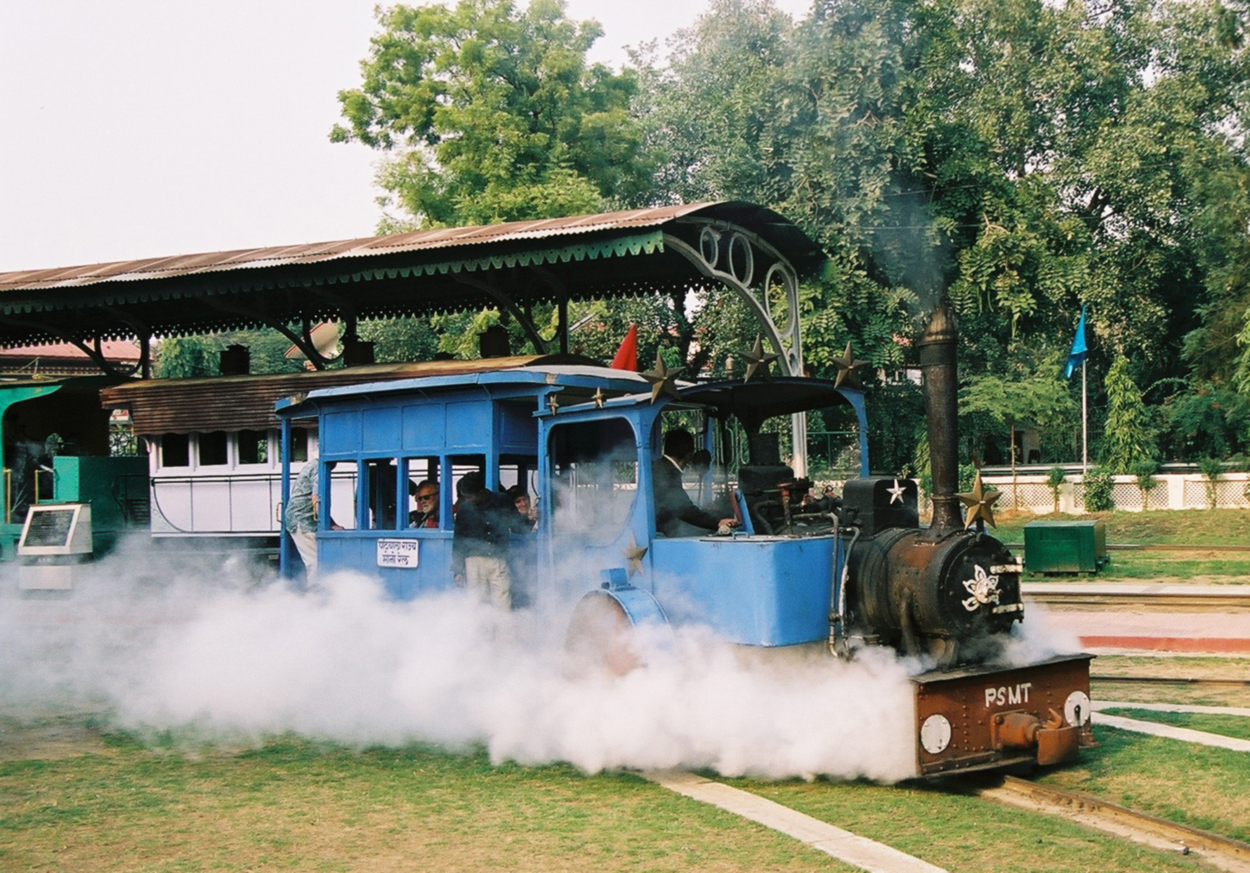
Patiala State Monorail at National Railway Museum

== Periodicals ==
The Academy publishes a newsletter Rail Parisar (Rail Campus) and the bilingual Abhivyakti (Expression) which carries technical and literary articles by Faculty and alumni.

== Heritage ==
Mild weathering of the limestone facade of the century-old palace as a whole is evident but is severe in some locations. The interior has suffered from heavy use. Conservation efforts are being initiated. A heritage arcade with an indoor photo gallery has come up in the Palace Guard House at the main entrance. A renovated narrow gauge (2"6') passenger coach is on display next to the guard house.

A heritage walk is being planned for the citizens of Vadodara in the palace grounds in collaboration with the Vadodara Municipal Corporation.

== Sports ==
Sports facilities includes badminton, tennis, squash basketball and volleyball courts, a swimming pool & sauna, a cricket and football ground, a gymnasium, a billiards and table tennis lounge, other indoor games and a small golfing green.

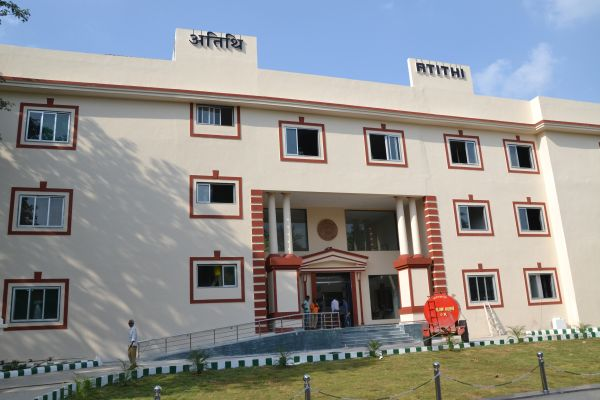
Atithi Hostel

== Mess ==
NAIR Officers Mess has one AC dining hall with a capacity of 200 and is managed by a committee of trainee officers and FMs on a "no profit, no loss" basis.

== Hostels ==
The Academy has three hostels, with a capacity to accommodate about 200 officers in 170 air-conditioned rooms with rooms earmarked on ground floor for disabled officers.

== Former Director Generals/Principals ==
P.C Bahl	Principal	02.01.1952	10.03.1956
A.C. Mukherji	Principal	26.04.1956	02.04.1958
A.V. D'Costa	Principal	15.04.1958	01.04.1959
M.A. Rao	Principal	06.08.1959	05.05.1960
S.S. Surana	Principal	14.05.1960	09.05.1962
Hari Sinha	Principal	14.05.1962	20.01.1963
A.C. Mukherji	Principal	21.01.1963	19.01.1966
Hari Sinha	Principal	20.01.1966	18.02.1967
A.S. Latif	Principal	24.02.1967	03.04.1967
Rajendra Dev	Principal	18.05.1967	03.01.1969
S.R. Gokhale	Principal	16.11.1969	31.07.1975
O.D. Agnihotri	Principal	22.03.1976	17.06.1977
K.S. Charyulu	Principal	18.06.1977	31.10.1979
O.D. Agnihotri	Principal	17.03.1980	13.10.1980
Inder Sahai	Principal	19.01.1981	31.03.1984
T.S. Vardya	Principal	04.04.1984	28.04.1985
A.K. Pant	Principal	29.04.1985	27.10.1986
C.S. Christan	Principal	28.10.1986	07.07.1987
J. Rajagopalachari	Principal	08.07.1987	16.03.1988
B.V. Rama Rao	Principal	27.03.1988	31.01.1990
B.P. Singh	Principal	31.01.1990	31.01.1992
Hari Prakash Mittal	Principal	06.04.1992	03.08.1992
Hasan Iqbal	Principal	03.08.1992	14.08.1993
K Balasubramanian	Principal	15.08.1983	28.07.1984
Rajendra Bhansali	Principal	29.07.1994	30.11.1996
J.M. Ovasadi	Principal	24.11.1997	31.02.1997
N. Krutivasan	Principal	08.04.1997	29.08.1997
Chandra Bijlani	Principal	29.08.1997	25.06.2000
Chandra Bijlani	DG	26.06.2000	31.03.2002
Suresh Chandra Gupta	DG	05.04.2002	31.05.2002
G.K. Garg	DG	31.05.2002	30.06.2005
Smt. Shobhana Jain	DG	07.07.2005	31.08.2008
A.K. Jhingron	DG	09.09.2008	31.10.2008
Smt. Sowmya Raghavan	DG	31.10.2008	29.11.2008
H.S. Pannu	DG	29.11.2008	28.12.2008
A.K. Vohra	DG	29.12.2009	25.08.2009
B.B. Moudgil	DG	27.08.2009	24.11.2009
C.P. Verma	DG	25.11.2009	29.07.2010
Niraj Kumar	DG	29.07.2010	31.12.2012
Mahesh Kumar	DG	01.01.2013	09.04.2013
Pramod Kumar	DG	10.04.2013	31.12.2013
Mrs. R. Ravikumar	DG	31.12.2013	14.10.2014
R.C. Agrawal	DG	27.10.2014	31.11.2014
Hemant Kumar	DG	01.12.2014	31.12.2014
S. Mookerjee	DG	31.12.2014	30.09.2015
G.C. Agrawal	DG	01.10.2015	12.04.2016
Rajeev Gupta	DG	13.04.2016	
Pradeep Kumar	DG		
S.P.S Chauhan	DG		incumbent
