= Railways Act, 1989 =

Indian Railway Act,1989

Parliament of India
- Long title: An Act to consolidate and amend the law relating to Railways.
- Citation: Act No. 24 of 1989
- Territorial extent: India
- Enacted by: Parliament of India
- Enacted: 3 June 1989
- Effective: 1 July 1990

Repeals
- Indian Railways Act, 1890 (9 of 1890)

Amended by
- Railways (Amendment) Act, 1994; Railways (Second Amendment) Act, 2003; Railways (Amendment) Act, 2003; Railways (Amendment) Act, 2005; Railways (Amendment) Act, 2008; Jan Vishwas (Amendment of Provisions) Act, 2023

Related legislation
- Arbitration and Conciliation Act, 1996; Scheduled Tribes and Other Traditional Forest Dwellers (Recognition of Forest Rights) Act, 2006
- Status: In force

The Railways Act, 1989 is an Act of the Parliament of India which regulates all aspects of rail transport. The Act came into force in 1989, replacing the Railways Act of 1890. The Act provides in detail the legislative provisions regarding railway zones, construction and maintenance of works, passenger and employee services.

== Definitions ==
Some of the definitions from the act are given below:

- "authorized" means authorized by a railway administration;
- "carriage" means the carriage of passengers or goods by a railway administration;
- "Claims Tribunal" means the Railway Claims Tribunal established under section 3 of the Railway Claims Tribunal Act, 1987 (54 of 1987);
- "classification" means the classification of commodities made under section 31 for the purpose of determining the rates to be charged for carriage of such commodities;
- "class rates" means the rate fixed for a class of commodity in the classification;
- "Commissioner" means the Chief Commissioner of Railway Safety or the Commissioner of Railway Safety appointed under section 5;
- "commodity" means a specific item of goods;
- "consignee" means the person named as consignee in a railway receipt;
- "consignment" means goods entrusted to a railway administration for carriage;
- "consignor" means the person, named in a railway receipt as consignor, by whom or on whose behalf goods covered by the railway receipt are entrusted to a railway administration for carriage;
- "demurrage" means the charge levied for the detention of any rolling stock after the expiry of free time, if any, allowed for such detention;
- "endorsee" means the person in whose favor an endorsement is made, and in the case of successive endorsements, the person in whose favor the last endorsement is made;
- "endorsement" means the signing by the consignee or the endorsee after adding a direction on a railway receipt to pass the property in the goods mentioned in such receipt to a specified person;
- "fare" means the charge levied for the carriage of passengers;
- "ferry" includes a bridge of boats, pontoons or rafts, a swing bridge, a fly-bridge and a temporary bridge and the approaches to, and landing places of, a ferry;
- "forwarding note" means the document executed under section 64;
- "freight" means the charge levied for the carriage of goods including transhipment charges, if any;
- "General Manager" means the General Manager of a Zonal Railway appointed under section 4;
- "goods" includes-
- containers, pallets or similar articles of transport used to consolidate goods; and animals;
- "Government railway" means a railway owned by the Central Government;
- "in transit", in relation to the carriage of goods by railway, means the period between the commencement and the termination of transit of such goods, and unless otherwise previously determined-
  - transit commences as soon as the railway receipt is issued or the consignment is loaded, whichever is earlier;
  - transit terminates on the expiry of the free time allowed for unloading of consignment from any rolling stock and where such unloading has been completed within such free time, transit terminates on the expiry of the free time allowed, for the removal of the goods from the railway premises;
- "level crossing" means an inter-section of a road with lines of rails at the same level;
- "luggage" means the goods of a passenger either carried by him in his charge or entrusted to a railway administration for carriage;
- "lump sum rate" means the rate mutually agreed upon between a railway administration and a consignor for the carriage of goods and for any service in relation to such carriage
- "non-Government railway" means a railway other than a Government railway;
- "notification" means a notification published in the Official Gazette;
- "parcel" means goods entrusted to a railway administration for carriage by a passenger or a parcel train;
- "pass" means an authority given by the Central Government or a railway Administration to a person allowing him to travel as a passenger, but does not include a ticket;
- "passenger" means a person traveling with a valid pass or ticket;
- "prescribed" means prescribed by rules made under this Act;
- "railway" means a railway, or any portion of a railway, for the public carriage of passengers or goods, and includes-
  - all lands within the fences or other boundary marks indicating the limits of the land appurtenant to a railway;
  - all lines of rails, sidings, or yards, or branches used for the purposes of, or in connection with, a railway;
  - all electric traction equipment, power supply and distribution installations used for the purposes of, or in connection with, a railway;.
  - all rolling stock, stations, offices, warehouses, wharves, workshops, manufactories, fixed plant and machinery, roads and streets, running rooms, rest houses, institutes, hospitals, water works and water supply installations, staff' dwellings and any other works constructed for the purpose of, or in connection with, railway;
  - all vehicles which are used on any road for the purposes of traffic of a railway and owned, hired or worked by a railway, and
  - all ferries, ships, boats and rafts which are used on any canal, river, lake or other navigable inland waters for the purposes of the traffic of a railway and owned, hired or worked by a railway administration, but does not include-
    - a tramway wholly within a municipal area;. and
    - lines of rails built in any exhibition ground, fair, park, or any other place solely for the purpose of recreation;
  - "railway administration", in relation to-
    - a Government railway, means the General Manager of a Zonal Railway; and
    - a non-Government railway, means the parson who is the owner or lessee of the railway or the person working the railway under an agreement;
- "railway receipt" means the receipt issued under section 65;
- "railway servant" means any person employed by the Central Government or by a railway administration in connection with the service of a railway;
- "rate" includes any fare, freight or any other charge for the carriage of any passenger or goods;
- "regulations" means the regulations made by the Railway Rates Tribunal under this Act;
- "rolling stock" includes locomotives, lenders, carriages, wagons, rail-cars, containers, trucks, trolleys and vehicles of all kinds moving on rails;
- "station to station rate" means a special reduced rate applicable to a specific commodity booked between specified stations;
- "traffic" includes rolling stock of every description, as well as passengers and goods;
- "Tribunal" means the Railway Rates Tribunal constituted under section 33;
- "wharfage" means the charge levied on goods for not removing them from the railway after the expiry of the free time for such removal;
- "Zonal Railway" means a Zonal Railway constituted under section 3.

== Powers ==
=== Executing necessary works ===
According to this act, a railway administration may make or construct in or upon, across, under, or over any lands, or any streets, hills, valleys, roads, railway, tramways, or any rivers, canals, brooks, streams, or other waters, or any drains, water-pipes, gas-pipes, oil-pipes, sewers. electric supply lines, or telegraph lines such, temporary or permanent inclined-planes, bridges, tunnels, culverts, embankments, aqueducts, roads, lines of rails, ways, passages, conduits, drains, piers, cuttings and fences, in-take wells, tube wells, dams, river training and protection works as it thinks proper; alter the course of any rivers, brooks, streams or other water courses, for the purpose of constructing and maintaining tunnels, bridges, passages or other works over or under them and divert or alter either temporarily or permanently, the course of any rivers, brooks, streams or other water courses or any roads, streets or ways, or raise or sink the level thereof, in order to carry them more conveniently over or under, or by the side of the railway, make drains or conduits into, through or under any lands adjoining the railway for the purpose of conveying water from or to the railway; erect and construct such houses, warehouses, offices and other buildings, and such yards, stations, wharves, engines, machinery apparatus and other works and conveniences as the railway administration thinks proper, alter, repair or discontinue such buildings, works and conveniences as aforesaid or any of them and substitute others in their stead; erect operate, maintain or repair any telegraph and telephone lines in connection with the working of the railway, erect operate, maintain or repair any electric traction equipment, power supply and distribution installation in connection with the working of the railway; and do all other acts necessary for making, maintaining, altering or repairing and using the railway

=== Scheduling ===
- Every railway administration shall cause to be pasted in a conspicuous and accessible place at every station in Hindi and English and also in the regional language commonly in use in the area where the station is
  - a table of times of arrival and departure of trains which carry passengers and stop at that station, and
  - list of fares from such station to such other stations as it may consider necessary.
- At every station where tickets are issued to passengers, a copy of the time table in force shall be kept in the office of the station master.

=== Pricing and rates ===
As per the act, the Central Government may, from time to time, by general or special order fix, for the carriage of passengers and goods, rates for the whole or any part of the railway and different rates may be fixed for different classes of goods and specify in such order the conditions subject to which such rates shall apply. the Central Government may also, by a like order, fix the rates of any other charges incidental to or connected with such carriage including demurrage and wharfage for the whole or any part of the railway and specify in the order the conditions subject to Which such rates shall apply.

== Offences ==
=== Smoking ===
- No person in any compartment of a train shall, if objected to by any other passenger in that compartment, smoke therein.
- Notwithstanding anything contained in other sub-sections, a railway administration may prohibit smoking in any train or part of a train.
- Whosoever contravenes the provisions of other sub-sections shall be punishable with fine which may extend to ₹100.

=== Endangering safety ===
Any person committing an offence under this Act or any rule made thereunder shall be triable for such offence in any place in which he may be or which the State Government may notify in this behalf, as well as in any other place in which he is liable to be tried under any law for the time being in force.

If any railway servant, when on duty, endangers the safety of any person-

- by disobeying any rule made under this Act; or
- by disobeying any instruction, direction or order under this Act or the rules made there under; or
- by any rash or negligent act or omission, he shall be punishable with imprisonment for a term which may extend to two years, or with fine which may extend to ₹1000, or with both.

=== Obstruction ===
If any railway servant (whether on duty or otherwise) or any other person obstructs or causes to be obstructed or attempts to obstruct any train or other rolling stock upon a railway,-

- by squatting or picketing or during any Rail roko agitation or bandh; or
- by keeping without authority any rolling stock on the railway; or
- by tampering with, disconnecting or interfering in any other manner with its hose pipe or tampering with signal gear or otherwise, he shall be punishable with imprisonment for a term which may extend to two year, or with fine which may extend to two thousand rupees, or with both.

=== Travel offences ===
==== Traveling on roof, step or engine of a train ====
According to section 156 of this act, if any passenger or any other person, after being warned by a railway servant to desist, persists in traveling on the roof, step or footboard of any carriage or on an engine, or in any other part of a train not intended for the use of passengers, he shall be punishable with imprisonment for a term which may extend to three months, or with fine which imprisonment for a term which may extend to three months, or with fine which may extend to five hundred rupees, or with both and may be removed from the railway by any railway servant.

==== Traveling without pass/ticket ====
If any person, with intent to defraud a railway administration,-

- enters or remains in any carriage on a railway or travels in train in contravention of section 55, or
- uses or attempts to use a single pass or a single ticket which has already been used on a previous journey, or in the case of a return ticket, a half thereof which has already been so used.

he shall be punishable with imprisonment for a term which may extend of six months, or with fine which may extend to one thousand rupees, or with both:

Provided that in the absence of special and adequate reasons to the contrary to be mentioned in the judgment of the court, such punishment shall not be less than a fine of five hundred rupees.

- The person referred to in sub-section (1) shall also be liable to pay the excess charge mentioned in sub-section (3) in addition to the ordinary single fare for the distance which he has traveled, or where there is any doubt as to the station from which he started, the ordinary single fare from the station from which the train originally started, or if the tickets of passengers traveling in the train have been examined since the original starting of the train, the ordinary single fare from the place where the tickets were so examined or, in case of their having been examined more than once, were last examined.
- The excess charge referred to in sub-section (2) shall be a sum equal to the ordinary single fare referred to in that sub-section or fifty rupees, whichever is more.
- Notwithstanding anything contained in section 65 of the Indian Penal Code (45 of 1860), the court convicting an offender may direct that the person in default of payment of any fine inflicted by the court shall suffer imprisonment for a term which may extend to six months.

==== Entering reserved compartments ====
- If any passenger-
  - having entered a compartment wherein no berth or seat has been reserved by a railway administration for his use, or
  - having unauthorizedly occupied a berth or seat reserved by a railway administration for the use of another passenger, refuses to leave it when required to do so by any railway servant authorized in this behalf, such railway servant may remove him or cause him to be removed, with the aid of any other person, from the compartment, berth or seat, as the case may be, and he shall also be punishable with fine which may extend to five hundred rupees.
- If any passenger resists the lawful entry of another passenger into a compartment not reserved for the use of the passenger resisting, he shall be punishable with fine which may extend to two hundred rupees.

==== Altering tickets ====
- If any passenger-
  - having entered a compartment wherein no berth or seat has been reserved by a railway administration for his use, or
  - having unauthorizedly occupied a berth or seat reserved by a railway administration for the use of another passenger, refuses to leave it when required to do so by any railway servant authorized in this behalf, such railway servant may remove him or cause him to be removed, with the aid of any other person, from the compartment, berth or seat, as the case may be, and he shall also be punishable with fine which may extend to five hundred rupees.
- If any passenger resists the lawful entry of another passenger into a compartment not reserved for the use of the passenger resisting, he shall be punishable with fine which may extend to two hundred rupees.

== Provisions ==
=== Accident coverage ===
According to the act, any accident attended with loss of any human life, or with grievous hurt, as defined in the Indian Penal Code (45 of 1860), or with such serious injury to property as may be prescribed; or

- any collision between trains of which one is a train carrying passengers; or
- the derailment of any train carrying passengers, or of any part of such train; or
- any accident of a description usually attended with loss of human life or with such grievous hurt as aforesaid or with serious injury to property; or
- any accident of any other description which the Central Government may notify in this behalf in the Official Gazette, occurs, the station master of the station nearest to the place at which the accident occurs or where there is no station master, the railway servant in charge of the section of the railway on which the accident occurs, shall, without delay, give notice of the accident to the District Magistrate and Superintendent of Police, within whose jurisdiction the accident occurs, the officer in charge of the police station within the local limits of which the accident occurs and to such other Magistrate or police officer as may be appointed in this behalf by the Central Government.
- The railway administration within whose jurisdiction the accident occurs, as also the railway administration to whom the train involved in the accident belongs, shall without delay, give notice of the accident to the State Government and the Commissioner having jurisdiction over the place of the accident.
