= Indian Railways Institute of Electrical Engineering =

Training institute in Maharashtra, India

Indian Railways Institute of Electrical Engineering (IRIEEN), Nashik
- Official Emblem of Indian Railways
- Parent institution: Indian Railways
- Founder: Ministry of Railways (India)
- Established: 1988
- Location: Nashik
- Website: IRIEEN Nashik

The Indian Railways Institute of Electrical Engineering (IRIEEN) was established in 1988 by Indian Railways at Nashik, Maharashtra, to train newly appointed officers of the Indian Railway Service of Electrical Engineers (IRSEE), recruited through the Engineering Services Examination conducted by the Union Public Service Commission. The institute is headed by a director, assisted by nine faculty members.

As laid down by the Railway Board, the institute conducts statutory training programmes including:

- Induction training for IRSEE probationers
- Integrated orientation courses for Group B officers prior to their induction into Group A services
- Senior Professional Development Courses for Junior Administrative Grade officers prior to promotion to Selection Grade

It also operates a Supervisor Training Centre (STC) for induction and refresher courses for supervisors, junior engineers, and senior section engineers, alongside short-term specialised courses requested by zonal railways.

The IRIEEN is one of six centralised training institutes that share the task of training officers. The other centralised training institutes are:

- Indian Railways Institute of Transport Management, Lucknow, for Indian Railway Traffic Service Officers recruited through the Civil Services Exam.
- Indian Railways Institute of Civil Engineering, Pune, for civil engineers,
- Indian Railways Institute of Mechanical and Electrical Engineering & Jamalpur Gymkhana, Jamalpur for mechanical engineers
- Indian Railways Institute of Signal and Telecommunications Engineering, Secunderabad for engineers of the S&T department
- RPF Academy Lucknow, for officers of the Railway Protection Force and
- Railway Staff College, Vadodara, functions as the apex training institute for the officers of all departments in general and the Accounts, Personnel, Stores, and Medical departments in particular.

== See also ==
- Indian Railways organisational structure
