= Railway Protection Force =

Indian paramilitary force

Railway Protection Force (RPF) रेलवे सुरक्षा बल

- Flag of RPF
- Abbreviation: RPF
- Motto: यशो लभस्व (Sanskrit) "Attain Honour"

Agency overview
- Formed: 2 July 1872
- Employees: 75,000 active personnel

Jurisdictional structure
- Federal agency: IN
- Operations jurisdiction: IN
- Governing body: Ministry of Railways, Government of India
- Constituting instrument: RPF Act, 1957
- General nature: Federal law enforcement
- Specialist jurisdiction: Railways, tramways, rail transit systems

Operational structure
- Headquarters: New Delhi, India
- Minister responsible: Ashwini Vaishnaw, Minister of Railways
- Agency executive: Jitendra Kumar , IPS, Director General, RPF
- Zones: 18

Website
- indianrailways.gov.in

The Railway Protection Force (RPF) is a security force in India under the Ministry of Railways, Government of India. The force was established by the RPF Act, 1957, enacted by the Indian Parliament for "the better protection and security of railway property and passenger area". It has the power to search, arrest, enquire, and prosecute offenses committed under the Railway Property (Unlawful Possession) Act 1966 and the Railways Act, 1989 (amended from time to time). RPF has also been entrusted with the responsibility of security of railway passenger area and railway passengers since 2004. However the power of arrests under other penal laws rests in the hands of the Government Railway Police (GRP) of each state.

Currently, Jitendra Kumar (IPS) is the Director General of Railway Protection Force.

== History ==
=== 1854–1861 ===
The maintenance and security of Railways, the vital artery of national communication and economic progress has been a major concern of the Government of India that goes back to the times when the Railway commenced their operations in India in 1854. Since railways have a linear territory traversing inter-state lines, a foolproof security system has been hard to provide. Nevertheless, the genesis of such an endeavor can be traced back to 1854 when East Indian Railways employedcertain staff designated as ‘Police’ to denote its own force by enacting the Police Act, 1861 and deployed a contingent for the security of the railway with the owner companies bearing their upkeep. The Railway Companies exercised full control over the Police Force.

=== 1861–1956 ===
On the recommendation of Railway Police Committee, 1872, Railway Police was organized into ‘Govt. Police’ (The precursor of GRP) for Law enforcement and ‘Company Police’ (The precursor of RPF) for Watch and Ward duties in Railways. The actual separation of duties came into effect in 1881. By 1882, as a result of formal division of the Police Force deployed on the railways into “Government Police” and “Private (Companies) Police”, the Railway Companies directly assumed the responsibility of protection and Security of their property as well as of the goods entrusted to them by public for carriage. For this, they appointed “Chowkidars” for various departments and placed them under control of their local departmental heads. With an increase in commercial traffic and consequential steep rise in the incidence of theft of goods entrusted to railways for carriage, the “Chowkidar” system was reorganized after the first World War onto Watch & Ward organization under a single superior officer designated as Superintendent, Watch & Ward – a system which continued up to 1954.Thus the Railway Police Administration functioned under three different systems viz the district system, as a part of District Police; the provincial system, for each province and the Railway Administration system, separate Railway Police for each Railway Administration in spite of recommendations of Indian Police commission, 1902-03. The provincial system found acceptance on recommendation of Railway Police Committee, 1921 and the present GRP came into existence. The ‘Company Police’ evolved into present RPF in 1957 passing through "Watch and Ward" phase from 1872-1954, and as "Railway Security Force" from 1954-1956. RPF was also given limited legal powers under Railway Stores (Unlawful Possession) Act.

=== 1957–1985 ===
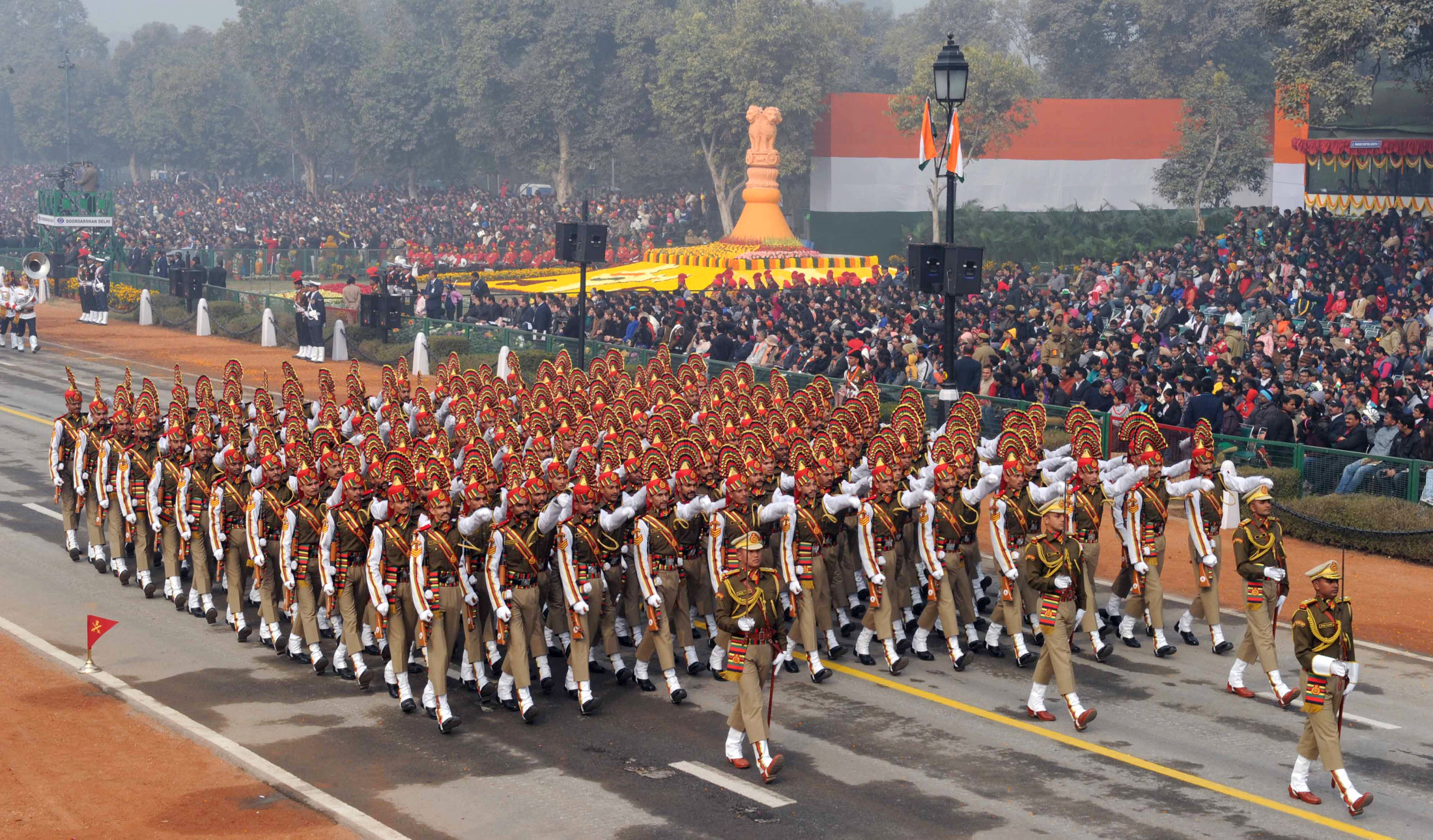
The RPF marching contingent passes through the Rajpath, on the occasion of the 67th Republic Day Parade 2016, in New Delhi on January 26, 2016

Thus, for a full 100 years, the Force though being used for providing security to the vital artery of national communication and economic progress did not itself have any legislative status. Therefore the Govt. instituted a special enquiry through Director, Intelligence Bureau (Ministry of Home Affairs) who in his report in 1954 forcefully brought out the necessity of organising the Watch & Ward on a statutory basis. The Railway Board also appointed a Security Adviser to the Railway Board in July, 1953 to work out the details for the reorganisation of the Watch & Ward department. It was decided in consultation with the Ministry of Home Affairs that there should be an integrated well organised force on the model of the Police with adequate supervisory staff specially trained to meet the particular aspects of crime that were relevant to Railway property and to work in close collaboration and act as a second line to the States Police with whom, under the Constitution, policing on Railways rested. This led to the R.P.F. Bill for the better protection and security. It was only on 29 August 1957 that a Railway Protection Force Act was enacted by the Parliament and Railway Security Force was renamed as Railway Protection Force. The RPF Rules were made on 10 September 1959 and RPF Regulations wee formulated in 1966.In the meantime in 1962 “Special Emergency Force” has been raised from the existing strength of RPF during Chinese Aggression, which was especially entrusted the task to protect trains in border districts. In 1965 it has been renamed as “Railway Protection Special Force”. In 1966 RPF has been given legal powers for better protection of Railway property by enacting Railway Property (Unlawful Possession.) Act.

But, while the provisions of RPF Act were soon found wanting for the maintenance of an effective and disciplined Force, the RPF Rules and Regulations too were found judicially unsound. The RPF Act, 1957 was accordingly modified by Parliament vide Act No.60 of 1985 on 20 September 1985 for the constitution and maintenance of the Force as an armed force of the Union. For carrying out the purposes of the Act, RPF Rules 1987 was framed.

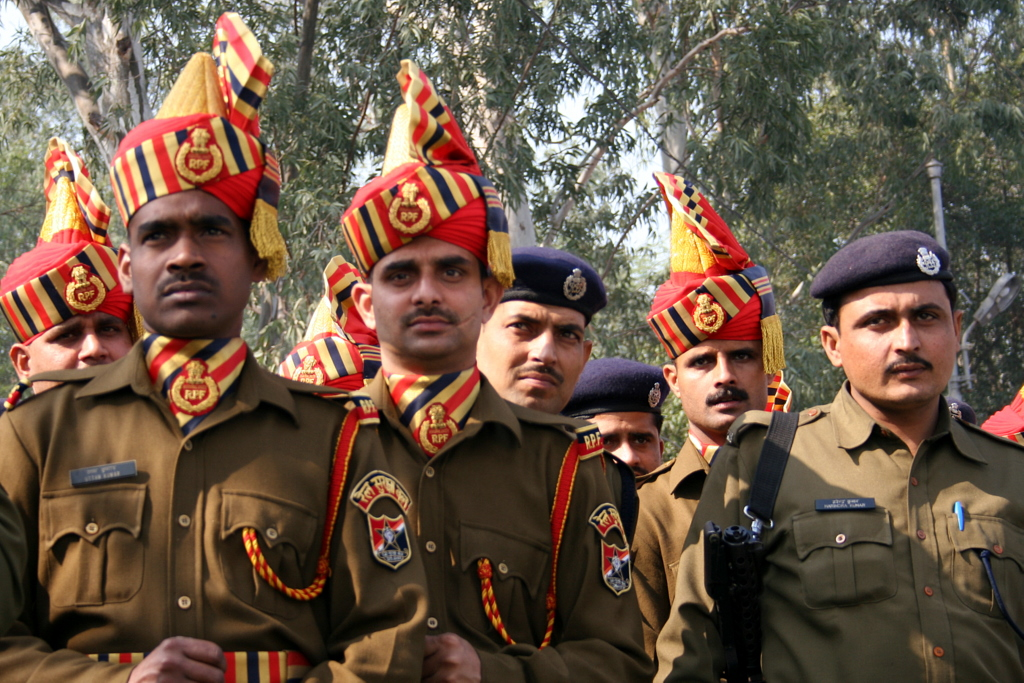
Railway Protection Force personnel at a function

=== 2010–2024 ===
The percentage of women in the RPF is the highest among all central paramilitary forces in India. It stands at 10% as of March 2019.

== Jurisdiction ==
The Railway Protection Force (RPF) is endowed with significant authority to enforce legal provisions pertaining to railway property and operations. Specifically, the RPF possesses the power to arrest, investigate, and prosecute individuals found in violation of The Railway Property (Unlawful Possession) Act and The Railways Act.

Moreover, in 2019, the RPF was granted additional empowerment under the Narcotic Drugs and Psychotropic Substances (NDPS) Act, allowing officers to undertake search, seizure, and arrest activities in relation to drug-related offenses. Notably, officers holding the rank of Assistant Sub Inspector and above within the RPF hierarchy are authorized to exercise the powers and fulfill the duties outlined in section 42 of the NDPS Act within their respective jurisdictions.

Any crime that takes place in the railway jurisdiction falls under the Government Railway Police, which is part of the respective State Police Force. The responsibilities of the Railway Police include the maintenance of law and order, prevention and detection of crimes, as well as investigation and policing on railways and railway premises, including running trains.

The Railway Protection Force launched a scheme called Nanhe Farishtey in 2018 to rescue missing children and have saved more than 80,000 children by now

== Structure (Gazetted officers) ==
The Gazetted IRPFS Officers utilise a similar rank structure to the IPS (Indian Police Service). Non-Gazetted ranks are the same as those used in the State Police Services. The job profile differs for each position

Grade	RPF Position	Equivalent Position or Designation in the Government of India (GOI)
Above Super Time Scale (Apex Scale)	Director General of RPF (DG, RPF)	Director General (GOI), Secretary (R) in Cabinet Secretariat (GOI), Director General in CAPFs, Lieutenant-General (three-star rank).
Above Super Time Scale (HAG) (Pay-Band-4)	Additional Director General (ADG)	Additional Director General of Police, Commissioner of Police (City), Special or Additional Director (GOI), Special or Additional Secretary (R) Cabinet Secretariat (GOI), ADG in CAPFs.
Super Time Scale (Senior Administrative Grade) (Pay-Band-4) (IG after 5 years of service as DIG)	Principal Chief Security Commissioner (PCSC) or Inspector-General (IG), Railway Protection Special Force (RPSF)	Inspector General of Police, Commissioner of Police (City), Joint Secretary if empaneled as such (R) Cabinet Secretariat (GOI), IG of CAPFs. Major-General (two-star rank).
Super Time Scale (DIG/Conservator Grade) (Pay-Band-4) (DIG after 5 years of service as Sr. DSC/Sr. Commandant RPSF)	Chief Security Commissioner (CSC); Deputy Inspector-General (DIG), RPSF	Director (R) Cabinet Secretariat (GOI), DIG in CAPFs. Brigadier (one-star rank).
Selection Grade (Pay-Band-4) (After 8 years of service as DSC/Commandant RPSF)	Deputy Chief Security Commissioner (Dy.CSC) (Zone); Sr. Security Commissioner, Sr. Divisional Security Commissioner (Sr.DSC) (Division); Sr. Commandant RPSF	Senior Superintendent of Police, Director (R) Cabinet Secretariat (GOI), Senior Commandants of CAPFs. Colonel.
Senior Time Scale (Pay-Band-3) (After 5 years of service in cadre)	Divisional Security Commissioner (Division); Security Commissioner RPF; Commandant RPSF	Superintendent of Police, Commandants of CAPFs. Lieutenant Colonel (pay grade).
Junior Time Scale (Pay-Band-3)	Assistant Security Commissioner (ASC); ASC (Division); Assistant Commandant RPSF/Adjutant	Assistant Superintendent of Police, Deputy Superintendent of Police, Circle Officer, Senior Field Officer (R) Cabinet Secretariat. Lieutenant/Major (pay grade).

== Ranks ==
=== Gazetted Officers ===
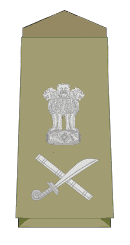
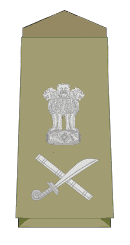
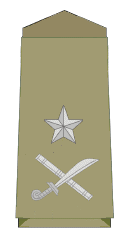
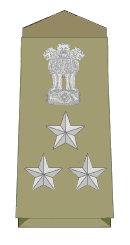
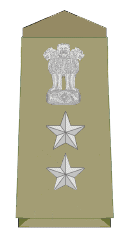
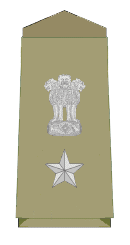
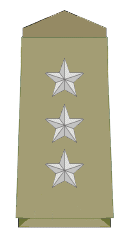
Rank group	General / flag officers				Senior officers			Junior officers
Railway Protection Force
Railway Protection Force	Director general	Additional director general	Inspector general/ Principal chief security commissioner	Deputy inspector general/ Chief security commissioner	Senior commandant/ Senior divisional security commissioner	Commandant/ Divisional security commissioner		Assistant commandant/ Assistant security commissioner
Police equivalent	Director General (DGP) / Additional Director General (ADG)		Inspector General (IG)	Deputy Inspector General (DIG)	Senior Superintendent (SSP)	Superintendent (SP)	Additional Superintendent (ASP)	ACP/ DSP

=== Non-gazetted officers ===
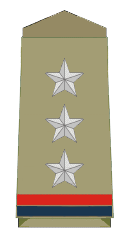
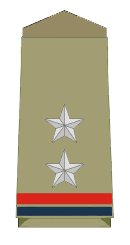
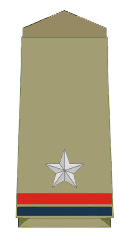
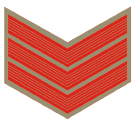
Rank group	Subordinate Officers (SO)			Non commissioned officers (NCO)	Enlisted
Railway Protection Force					No insignia
Railway Protection Force	Inspector निरीक्षक	Sub inspector उप निरीक्षक	Assistant sub-inspector सहायक उप निरीक्षक	Head constable हवलदार	Constable -

== Weapons ==
RPF personnel are trained and equipped with a variety of firearms, including pistols, carbines, assault rifles, self-loading rifles (SLRs in the past) and light machine guns. According to a 2011 Railway Board order, personnel of the rank of assistant sub-inspector (ASI) and above are issued 9mm pistols. For head constables, 15% receive AK-47 rifles, 20% are equipped with INSAS rifles, and 10% with SLRs in the past now replaced with INSAS rifles, while the remainder are armed with other carbines and pistols. Among Constables, 10% are given AK-47 rifles, 25% INSAS rifles, 15% SLRs, and the rest are issued carbines and pistols. In the RPSF, Head Constables receive 30% AK-47s, 40% INSAS rifles, and the remaining are provided with pistols and carbines. RPSF Constables are primarily equipped with INSAS rifles (55%), with 20% receiving AK-47s and the rest receiving pistols and carbines. All trained drivers, regardless of rank, are issued 9mm pistols.

== Governance ==
The governance of RPF is based on the following relevant legislation, rules and directives.

- Railway Protection Force Act, 1957
- Railway Property (Unlawful Possession) Act, 1966
- Railway Protection Force Rules, 1987 – Laid, by the central government, as per provisions under RPF Act, 1957.
- Railway Protection Force Directives, 1987

Command Structure
Designation – Superior Officers
HQ	Zonal HQ	Division	Battalion
Director General (DG)			
Additional Director General Inspector General	Principal Chief Security Commissioner		Principal Chief Security Commissioner/RPSF
	Chief Security Commissioner		Chief Security Commissioner/RPSF
	Dy. Chief Security Commissioner/Senior Security Commissioner	Senior Divisional Security Commissioner (Sr. DSC)	Sr. Commandant
		Divisional Security Commissioner (DSC)	Commandant
	Assistant Security Commissioner (ASC)	Assistant Security Commissioner (ASC)	Assistant Commandant / Adjutant

Designation – Subordinate Officers and below
Inspector
Sub-Inspector
Assistant Sub-Inspector
Driver / Head Constable
Constable

Units under RPF
Unit
Breeding and Training Center for police dogs
Central Crime Bureau
Central Weapons Store
Crime Intelligence wing
Special Intelligence Branch
Cyber Cell Branch

== Recruitment ==
All the officers of Railway Protection Force are members of the Indian Railway Protection Force Service (IRPFS) and are either recruited through UPSC Civil Services Examination or get promoted from Non-Gazetted ranks to Officer Ranks by time bound promotions. They are recruited as Group-A Central Civil Servants. However, the post of Director-General of RPF is held on deputation by a senior Indian Police Service (IPS) officer. Recruitment also occurs for various posts like sub-inspectors and constables. Such recruitments are conducted through various exams held by the Ministry of Railways, Government of India.

== See also ==
- Government Railway Police (GRP)
