= Engineering Services Examination =

Technical civil services of India

- Emblem of India
- Acronym: ESE
- Type: Paper-based standardised test
- Administrator: Union Public Service Commission
- Skills tested: General knowledge; Engineering knowledge
- Purpose: Recruitment of Engineers
- Year started: 1923; 103 years ago
- Duration: Prelims (5 hours); Mains (6 hours); Personality test (20 – 40 minutes)
- Score range: Overall (0–1300); Prelims (0–500); Mains (0–600); Interview (0–200)
- Offered: Once a year
- Restrictions on attempts: Unlimited until the upper age limit
- Regions: India
- Languages: English
- Annual number of test takers: 350,000 (approx)
- Prerequisites: B.E. or B.Tech from a recognised university or equivalent
- Fee: ₹200 (US$2.10)
- Used by: Government of India
- Qualification rate: 0.4%
- Website: upsc.gov.in upsconline.nic.in

The Engineering Services Examination (ESE) is a standardized test conducted annually by the Union Public Service Commission (UPSC) to recruit officers to various engineering services under the Government of India. Held in four categories—Civil, Mechanical, Electrical, and Electronics & Telecommunication, the exam has three stages comprising objective, subjective and personality tests. The Services are also informally known as Indian Engineering Services (IES).

Officers recruited through ESE are mandated to manage and conduct activities in diverse technical fields. Government infrastructure includes railways, roads, defence, manufacturing, inspection, supply, construction, public works, power, and telecommunications. Appointments are made by the President of India.

== List of Services ==
=== Civil Engineering ===
Name of the Service	Ministry/Department/Organization
Indian Railway Service of Engineers	Ministry of Railways
Central Engineering Service	Central Public Works Department
Central Engineering Service (Roads) (Group A)	Ministry of Road Transport and Highways
Survey of India Service (Group A)	Department of Science and Technology
AEE(Civil) in Border Road Engineering Service	Border Roads Organisation
Indian Defence Service of Engineers	Military Engineer Services
Indian Ordnance Factory Services (Group A)	(Civil) Department of Defence Production, Ministry of Defence
AEE(QS&C) in MES Surveyor Cadre	Military Engineer Services
Central Water Engineering Service (Group A)	Central Water Commission
Indian Skill Development Service	Ministry of Skill Development and Entrepreneurship

Indian railway management services includes Irms post

=== Mechanical Engineering ===
Name of the Service	Ministry/Department/Organization
Indian Railway Service of Mechanical Engineering	Ministry of Railways
AEE in GSI Engineering Service (Group A)	Ministry of Mines
Indian Defence Service of Engineers	Military Engineer Services
Indian Ordnance Factory Services (Group A)	(Mechanical) Department of Defence Production, Ministry of Defence
Indian Naval Armament Service (Mechanical)	Indian Navy
Indian Naval Material Management Service (Mechanical)	Indian Navy
Central Water Engineering Service (Group A)	Central Water Commission
Indian Skill Development Service	Ministry of Skill Development and Entrepreneurship
Defence Aeronautical Quality Assurance Services/SSO‐II (Mechanical)	Directorate General of Aeronautical Quality Assurance, Ministry of Defence
Central Electrical and Mechanical Engineering Service (Mechanical)	Central Public Works Department
Central Power Engineering Service (Group A) (Mechanical)	Central Electricity Authority
AEE (Electrical and Mechanical) in Border Roads Engineering	Border Roads Organisation

=== Electrical Engineering ===
Name of the Service	Ministry/Department/Organization
Indian Railway Service of Electrical Engineers	Ministry of Railways
Central Electrical and Mechanical Engineering Service (Electrical)	Central Public Works Department
Indian Defence Service of Engineers	Military Engineer Services
Indian Ordnance Factory Services (Group A)	(Electrical) Department of Defence Production, Ministry of Defence
Indian Naval Material Management Service (Electrical)	Indian Navy
Central Power Engineering Service (Group A) (Electrical)	Central Electricity Authority
Indian Naval Armament Service (Electrical)	Indian Navy
Defence Aeronautical Quality Assurance Service/SSO‐II (Electrical)	Directorate General of Aeronautical Quality Assurance, Ministry of Defence
Indian Skill Development Service	Ministry of Skill Development and Entrepreneurship

=== Electronics and Telecommunication Engineering ===
Name of the Service	Ministry/Department/Organization
Indian Railway Service of Signal Engineers	Ministry of Railways
Indian Radio Regulatory Service (Group A)	Department of Telecommunications, Ministry of Communications
Indian Telecommunication Service (Group A)	Department of Telecommunications, Ministry of Communications
Indian Ordnance Factory Services (Group A)	(Electronics)Department of Defence Production, Ministry of Defence
Indian Naval Armament Service (Electronics and Telecommunication)	Indian Navy
Indian Naval Material Management Service (Electronics and Telecommunication)	Indian Navy
Junior Telecom Officer (Group B)	Department of Telecommunications, Ministry of Communications
Defence Aeronautical Quality Assurance Service/SSO‐II (Electronics & Telecommunication)	Directorate General of Aeronautical Quality Assurance, Ministry of Defence
Central Power Engineering (Group A) (Electronics & Telecommunication)	Central Electricity Authority
Indian Skill Development Service	Ministry of Skill Development and Entrepreneurship

== Functions of officers ==
The work performed by these officers largely depends on their engineering branch and service (or cadre). However, they can move to any cadre, organization, agency, department, ministry or public sector undertaking of the government of India. They are appointed to posts analogous to their present one, either on a fixed-term deputation basis (at least five years and extensible, after which the officer returns to their parent cadre) or an absorption basis where the official leaves the parent cadre for the new one.

== Eligibility ==
Candidates must be a citizen of India or Nepal or a subject of Bhutan, or a person of Indian origin who has migrated from Pakistan, Bangladesh, Myanmar, Sri Lanka, Kenya, Uganda, Tanzania, Zambia, Malawi, Zaire, Ethiopia or Vietnam with the intention of permanently settling in India.

The minimum educational requirement is a bachelor's degree in engineering (B.E. or B.Tech) from a recognised university or the equivalent. An M.Sc. degree or equivalent with wireless communications, electronics, radio physics or radio engineering as special subjects is also acceptable for certain services or posts.

The age range is 21–30 years on 1 January of the year of the Engineering Services Examination. The upper age limit is relaxed as follows:

- A maximum of three years for Other Backward Class candidates (non-creamy layer only)
- A maximum of four years for Defence Services personnel disabled in operations during hostilities with any foreign country or in a disturbed area and discharged as a consequence
- A maximum of five years for:
  - Candidates belonging to a Scheduled Caste or Scheduled Tribe
  - Candidates who resided in Jammu and Kashmir from 1 January 1980 to 31 December 1989
  - Ex-servicemen (including commissioned officers and ECOs or SSCOs) with at least five years of military service by 1 August
  - Candidates already in a permanent post of the Central Government Engineering Department

== Examination ==
Candidates are required to apply on the UPSC website. The application fee for general-category male candidates is 200. No fee is required for female and reserved-category applicants. Stage 1 of the test is conducted during the first week of January; Stage 2 is conducted in June and July across India. The government of India changed the Engineering Services Examination in 2017.

Revised examination
Stage	Type	Time	Marks
I (Prelims)	General studies and engineering aptitude paper	2 hours	200 (maximum)
I (Prelims)	Engineering discipline-specific paper	3 hours	300 (maximum)
II (Mains)	Discipline-specific paper I	3 hours	300 (maximum)
II (Mains)	Discipline-specific paper II	3 hours	300 (maximum)
III (Interview)	Personality test	20-40 Minutes	200 (maximum)

Candidates who qualify at Prelims are permitted to appear for the Mains examination, and those who qualify at Mains are permitted to appear for the MainsI examination. Candidates qualifying at all three stages are included on the examination's final merit list. The maximum score is 1300.

The personality test is an interview which assesses the candidate's suitability for a career in public service by a board of unbiased observers. The interview also assess social traits and interest in current affairs. Qualities judged include mental alertness, critical ability, clear and logical exposition, judgment, variety and depth of interests, social cohesion and leadership, and intellectual and moral integrity.

== Notable officers ==
- Narinder Singh Kapany – Former IOFS officer. Invented fibre optics that revolutionised laparoscopic and endoscopic surgery, telecommunications, power transmission, etc. Named as one of the seven "Unsung Heroes of the 20th century" by Fortune magazine for his Nobel Prize-deserving invention. Known as the "Father of Fibre Optics" and "The Man who Bent Light". Former Professor at Stanford, Universities of California at Berkeley, Santa Barbara and Santa Cruz. Had more than 150 patents to his credit. Conferred upon with Padma Vibhushan, the second-highest honour in India, Pravasi Bharatiya Samman, Fellowship of the Royal Academy of Engineering (FREng). He was also offered the post of Scientific Adviser to the Defence Minister of India by the first Prime Minister of India, Jawaharlal Nehru.
- Nalini Ranjan Mohanty - Former IOFS officer. Secured All India 2nd Rank in the Engineering Services Examination of 1965, served as the Chairman & Managing Director of Hindustan Aeronautics Limited, Director of Kudremukh Iron Ore Company, Mahanadi Coalfields, National Aluminium Company (NALCO), Bharat Earth Movers (BEML). Awarded Padma Shri in 2004 by the Government of India for his role in the development of LCA – Tejas.
- Rajendra K. Pachauri - former IRSME officer; chair of Intergovernmental Panel on Climate Change when the organisation received the Nobel Prize in 2007; director general of the Energy and Resources Institute; received Padma Bhushan and Padma Vibhushan from the government of India, the Order of the White Rose of Finland from the Finnish government, the Order of the Rising Sun (Gold and Silver Star) from the Japanese government and the Legion of Honour from the French government.
- H. P. S. Ahluwalia – IOFS. First Indian to climb Mount Everest. Author, mountaineer, social worker. Founder & Chairman of Indian Spinal Injuries Centre. Conferred on with the Arjuna Award, Padma Shri and Padma Bhushan by the Government of India, Fellowship of Royal Geographical Society (FRGS). Also served as a Commissioned officer in the Indian Army and Member of Planning Commission (India).
- Santu Shahaney - IOFS. Served as the first Indian Director General Ordnance Factories (DGOF). He was awarded Padma Shri in 1962, and Padma Bhushan in 1965, by the Government of India, in the Civil Service category, for his contributions during the Indo-China War of 1962 and the Indo-Pakistani War of 1965, respectively.
- R. M. Muzumdar - IOFS. Second Indian Director General of the Indian Ordnance Factories. He was awarded the Padma Bhushan by the Government of India, in 1973, in the Civil service category, for his contributions during the Indo-Pakistani War of 1971.
- Waman Dattatreya Patwardhan - IOFS officer. Developed the solid propellant for India's first space rocket launched from Thumba, and the detonation system of India's first nuclear bomb used in Operation Smiling Buddha. Served at the Ammunition Factory Khadki, and as the first Director of High Energy Materials Research Laboratory (HEMRL) and the Armaments Research and Development Establishment (ARDE) of the Defence Research and Development Organisation (DRDO). Awarded Padma Shri in 1974.
- H.G.S. Murthy - IOFS. Known as one of the "Seven Pioneers of the Indian Space Programme". He served at the Machine Tool Prototype Factory (MTPF), Ambernath, and as the first Director of the Thumba Equatorial Rocket Launching Station (TERLS), and the Space Science & Technology Centre, now known as the Vikram Sarabhai Space Centre, of the Indian Space Research Organisation (ISRO). Awarded Padma Shri in 1969.
- K. C. Banerjee - IOFS. Received Padma Shri in 1967, for his contributions during the Indo-Pakistani War of 1965, as the General Manager of Rifle Factory Ishapore, that developed and manufactured the 7.62 Self-Loading Automatic Rifle, that played decisive role in India's victory in the Indo-Pakistani War of 1965.
- O. P. Bahl, an IOFS officer. Received Padma Shri in 1972, in the civil-service category, as the General Manager of Ammunition Factory Khadki, which developed and manufactured the anti-submarine rockets used in sinking the submarine PNS Ghazi during the Indo-Pakistani War of 1971.
- Ashwani Lohani - IRSME officer; chairman of Indian Railways and former chairman and managing director of Air India. Holds a Limca record for having four engineering degree equivalents (mechanical, electrical and metallurgical engineering and electronics and telecommunications engineering from the Institution of Engineers.
- G. B. Meemamsi - Former ITS officer. Founding Director of C-DOT; received Padma Shri in 1998.
- Satyendra Dubey - Whistleblower against corruption; project director of the National Highways Authority of India's (NHAI) Golden Quadrilateral project at Koderma. After his assassination, the Whistle Blowers Protection Act, 2011 was passed.
- E. Sreedharan - Former IRSE officer, chairman and managing director of Konkan Railway, Cochin Shipyard and the Delhi Metro. Retired member of the Railway Board. Received Padma Shri and Padma Vibhushan from India, the Order of the Rising Sun (Gold and Silver Star) from Japan and the Legion of Honour from France.

== See also ==
- Graduate Aptitude Test in Engineering
- Civil Services Examination
- Union Public Service Commission
- Central Civil Services
- Joint Entrance Examination
