= Eknath Vasant Chitnis =

Indian space scientist (1925–2025)

- Born: 25 July 1925; Kolhapur, Kolhapur State, India
- Died: 22 October 2025 (aged 100); Pune, Maharashtra, India
- Occupation: Space scientist
- Known for: X-ray astronomy
- Awards: Padma Bhushan (1985)

Eknath Vasant Chitnis (25 July 1925 – 22 October 2025) was an Indian space scientist and a member secretary at the Indian National Committee for Space Research (INCOSPAR), which evolved into the present-day Indian Space Research Organisation (ISRO). He was also a director of the Space Applications Centre of ISRO and a colleague of APJ Abdul Kalam, the erstwhile President of India. The Government of India awarded him the Padma Bhushan, the third highest civilian award, in 1985.

== Life and career ==
Chitnis was born in Kolhapur on 25 July 1925. At a very young age, he lost his parents. His grandmother raised him. Soon after completing his graduation, he was reported to have worked at All India Radio, but only for a brief period of time. He started his scientific journey by joining the Physical Research Laboratory (PRL) in Ahmedabad.

Chitnis helped Vikram Sarabhai choose the location of the Thumba Equatorial Rocket Launching Station, which was the result of a location hunt done by Chitnis in 1961. Chitnis who recommended induction of A. P. J. Abdul Kalam into Indian space program after getting impressed by his resume and recommendation from H.G.S. Murthy (after interview by Murthy) by selecting him for the training under NASA.

In 2008, Chitnis was unanimously selected as the Chairman of the Press Trust of India.

Chitnis died on 22 October 2025, at the age of 100. His son, Chetan Chitnis, is a malaria researcher who is currently working at the Pasteur Institute in Paris.

== See also ==
- Indian space program
