= Defence Research and Development Service =

Scientific civil service of India

Agency overview
- Formed: 1979
- Preceding agency: Defence Science Service
- Type: Research and Development; Technology Management Governmental; Civil Service
- Employees: 7256
- Agency executive: Sameer V. Kamat
- Parent department: Ministry of Defence of India

Defence Research and Development Service (DRDS) (Hindi: रक्षा अनुसंधान एवं विकास सेवा) is a Central Group 'A' Civil Service of the Government of India. DRDS scientists are Gazetted (Group A) defence-civilian officers under the Ministry of Defence. They are responsible for developing new technologies and military hardware for the Indian defence and security forces.

== History ==
The Defence Research and Development Organisation (DRDO) came into existence in 1958 by the merger of the Technical Development Establishment and the Directorate of Technical Development and Production with the Defence Science Organisation. DRDS was formed in 1979, and a separate Department of Defence Research and Development was created in 1980, which later on administered DRDO and its 52 laboratories/establishments. A senior DRDS scientist was made the Director General of DRDO, Scientific Adviser to the Raksha Mantri (Defence Minister of India) and ex officio Secretary of the Department of Defence Research and Development.

However in 2015, the post was bifurcated and the senior DRDS scientist held the post of Director General of DRDO and the Secretary of the Department of Defence Research and Development. And a younger and experienced DRDS scientist was made the Scientific Adviser to the Raksha Mantri (SA to RM). Further in 2015, the post of Director General, DRDO was renamed as Chairman, DRDO.

== Recruitment ==
DRDS scientists are recruited into DRDO by one of the following means:

- Direct Recruitment through Scientist Entry Test.
- Transfer of officers from other Group A technical civil services, particularly through the Indian Ordnance Factories Service.
- Deputation or on Contract of suitable scientists and technologists from other research organisations.
- Absorption in civilian capacity of technical officers from the Indian Armed Forces.

== Training ==
Being engaged in defence technology research and development, the DRDS scientists have to be abreast with the latest technologies around the world and are trained at the premier Defence Institute of Advanced Technology, Pune. Since the DRDS scientists also have the responsibility of managing the workforce, establishments and projects of DRDO, they are trained in management at the Institute of Technology Management, Mussoorie. They are also educated and trained at the Indian Institutes of Technology, Indian Institutes of Management, and Indian Institute of Science, other civil and defence academies of India as well as at other foreign universities.

== Functions ==
DRDS scientists are engaged in developing defence technologies covering various fields like aeronautics, armaments, electronics, land combat engineering, life sciences, materials, missiles, and naval systems.

== Hierarchy ==
Ranks, designations, and positions held by DRDO scientists in their career
Grade / Scale (Level on Pay Matrix)	Posting in DRDO	Position in Government of India	Position in Order of precedence in India	Pay Scale (Basic Pay)
Apex Scale (Pay Level 17)	Secretary, Department of Defence R&D Chairman, DRDO	Secretary	23	₹225,000 (US$2,700)
Higher Administrative Grade + (Pay Level 16)	Distinguished Scientist (DS) Director General	Additional Secretary	25	₹205,400 (US$2,400)—₹224,400 (US$2,700)
Higher Administrative Grade (Pay Level 15)	Scientist 'H' (Outstanding Scientist) Director	Additional Secretary	25	₹182,200 (US$2,200)—₹224,100 (US$2,700)
Senior Administrative Grade (Pay Level 14)	Scientist 'G' Associate Director	Joint Secretary	26	₹144,200 (US$1,700)—₹218,200 (US$2,600)
Selection Grade (Pay Level 13A)	Scientist 'F' Additional Director	Director		₹131,100 (US$1,600)—₹216,600 (US$2,600)
Selection Grade (Pay Level 13)	Scientist 'E' Additional Director	Director		₹123,100 (US$1,500)—₹215,900 (US$2,600)
Junior Administrative Grade (Pay Level 12)	Scientist 'D' Joint Director (JAG)	Deputy Secretary		₹78,800 (US$930)—₹209,200 (US$2,500)
Senior Time Scale (Pay Level 11)	Scientist 'C' Deputy Director	Under Secretary		₹67,700 (US$800)—₹208,700 (US$2,500)
Junior Time Scale (Pay Level 10)	Scientist 'B' Assistant Director; Entry-level	Assistant Secretary		₹56,100 (US$660)—₹177,500 (US$2,100)

DRDO follows the merit-based promotion system for its Group A scientists rather than the seniority-based promotion system which is followed by the other civil services of India. The merit-based promotions ensure that only the exceptionally performing scientists are promoted to higher grades irrespective of their seniority and it is common to see a junior scientist superseding his seniors. In 2014, the Prime Minister of India, Narendra Modi, also called for reforms at the laboratory level and asked to appoint scientists below the age of 35 to head at least five laboratories and / or establishments out of the fifty-two establishments of DRDO. DRDS scientists can apply for service extension beyond the age of superannuation to ensure continuity of highly critical defence projects.

== Notable officers ==
- A. P. J. Abdul Kalam - 11th President of India. Known as the "Missile Man of India" and the "People's President". Served as the Director General of DRDO, SA to RM and Secretary, Department of Defence Research and Development from 1992 to 1999. Key architect of India's missile and space programmes. Awarded the three highest civilian honours of India: Bharat Ratna, Padma Vibhushan and Padma Bhushan among numerous other accolades from within the country and abroad.
- Raja Ramanna - "Father of the India's nuclear program". Served as the Director General of DRDO, SA to RM and Secretary of Department of Defence R&D, Secretary, Department of Atomic Energy, Chairman of Atomic Energy Commission, Indian Institute of Science, Bangalore, Indian Institute of Technology, Bombay, President, Indian National Science Academy, Director, Bhabha Atomic Research Centre, Minister of State for Defence and Member of Parliament. Awarded the Padma Vibhushan, Padma Bhushan and Padma Shri by the Government of India.
- A. Sivathanu Pillai - Founder CEO of BrahMos Aerospace. Receipient of Padma Shri and Padma Bhushan.
- Waman Dattatreya Patwardhan - Developed the solid propellant for India's first space rocket launched from Thumba, and the detonation system of India's first nuclear bomb used in Operation Smiling Buddha. Served at the Ammunition Factory Khadki, and as the first Director of High Energy Materials Research Laboratory (HEMRL) and the Armaments Research and Development Establishment (ARDE). Awarded the Padma Shri in 1974. Previously, he served as an IOFS officer at the Ammunition Factory Khadki.
- S. P. Chakravarti - Father of Electronics and Telecommunications engineering in India. During his tenure at DRDO, he was responsible for the founding of three major research laboratories of DRDO, viz., Electronics and Radar Development Establishment (LRDE) in Bengaluru, Defence Electronics Research Laboratory (DLRL) in Hyderabad and the Defence Research and Development Laboratory (DRDL) in Delhi. He served as the first Director of the Laser Science and Technology Centre (LASTEC) in Delhi.
- V. S. R. Arunachalam - Served as the Director General of DRDO, SA to RM and Secretary of Department of Defence R&D. Awarded the Padma Vibhushan and Padma Bhushan.
- V. K. Aatre - Served as the Director General of DRDO, SA to RM and Secretary of Department of Defence R&D. Awarded the Padma Vibhushan and Padma Bhushan.

== See also ==
- Indian Ordnance Factories Service
