= National Academy of Defence Production =

Indian military academy

National Academy of Defence Production, Nagpur
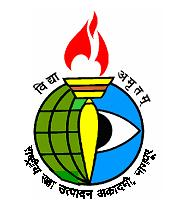
- NADP Official logo
- Type: Military Academy
- Established: 1978
- Director: Dr. J P Dash, IOFS
- Location: Nagpur, Maharashtra, 440021, India
- Campus: suburban
- Website: https://nadp.ac.in
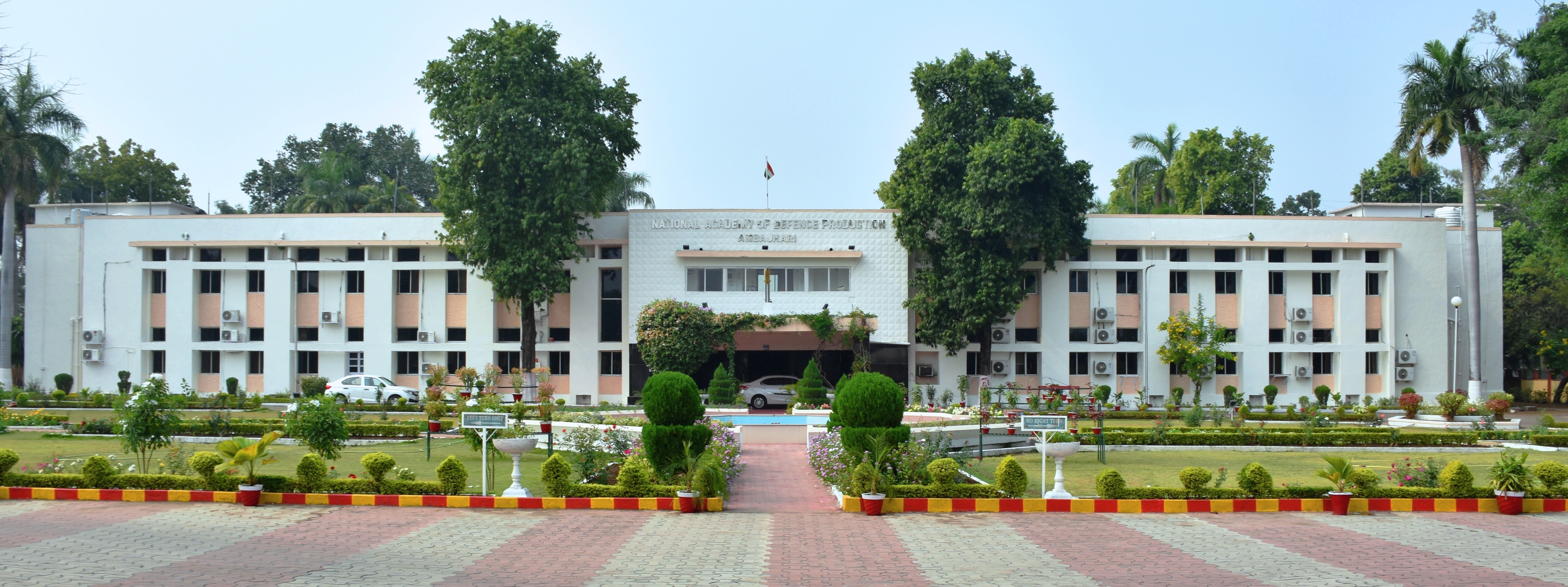

National Academy of Defence Production is an Indian training and development institute incorporated under Ordnance Factory Board. It imparts training to the Group-A gazetted officers recruited under Indian Ordnance Factories Service. The academy also offers Group-A officers serving in various ordnance factories a mid-career training program.

== History ==
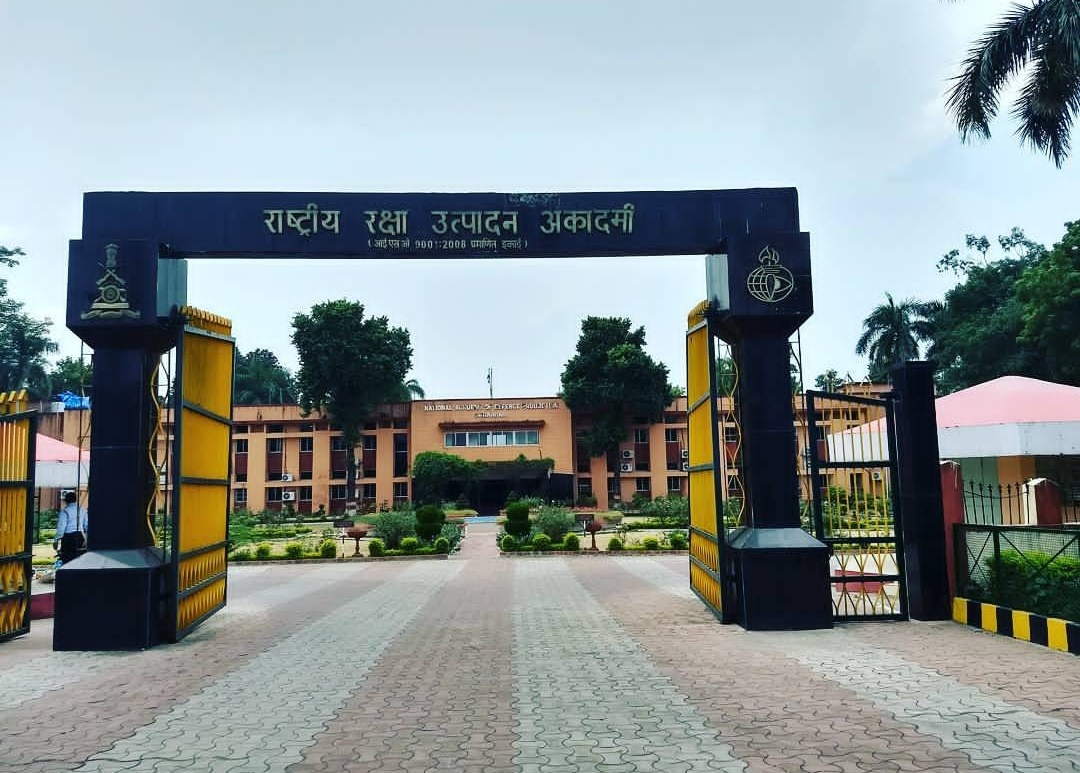
The main gate of the National Academy of Defence Production

NADP, formerly the Ordnance Factories Staff College (OFSC), has evolved into a premier institution shaping India’s defence production leadership. Established in 1978 to train IOFS officers, NADP began its journey in Ambajhari, Nagpur, overcoming early challenges with vision and resilience. Since launching its flagship Probationers’ Training Course in 1990, NADP has trained over 1300 officers, laying the foundation for a robust defence manufacturing cadre. The academy pioneered initiatives like Core Competency Training, Total Productive Maintenance (TPM), and mentorship programs, earning the Golden Peacock National Training Award in 2011. NADP’s transformation accelerated with its renaming in 2004, reflecting a broader mandate. It introduced immersive programs such as Armed Forces Attachments, and in 2020, was entrusted by the Central Information Commission to conduct RTI audits—underscoring its credibility and transparency. Becoming part of Munitions India Limited (MIL) in 2021 marked a new era. NADP earned accolades from DARPG for e-MDP innovations and achieved IMS certification (ISO 9001, 14001, 45001) in 2022. In 2023, it launched an AICTE-approved PGDM and was graded “अति उत्तम” under the NSCSTI Framework by the Capacity Building Commission. NADP celebrates its Foundation Day on 24 October 2024. NADP stands tall as a beacon of excellence, innovation, and nation-building—empowering professionals and advancing the vision of Atma Nirbhar Bharat in the defence sector.

== Programme ==
The institute conducts 64 weeks induction programme to the candidates (i.e. probationary officers) who are later deputed to Ordnance factories. It is quite a holistic training program that imparts basic skills needed among the newly recruited officers to run the various ordnance factories located all over the country. The program starts with introduction module followed by general administration and general management module.

The programme also includes attachments to:

- Various ordnance factories
- Visit to Ordnance Factory Board
- Defence Institute of Advanced Technology
- DRDO labs
- Visit to proof ranges – LPR Khamaria, CPE Itarsi, PXE Balasore
- Armed forces attachment
- Army attachment – visit to different army base camp such Amritsar, is carried out. The location of attachment changes every year.
- Navy attachment – Any one of location Kochi, Mumbai and Vishakhapatnam
- Air Force attachment

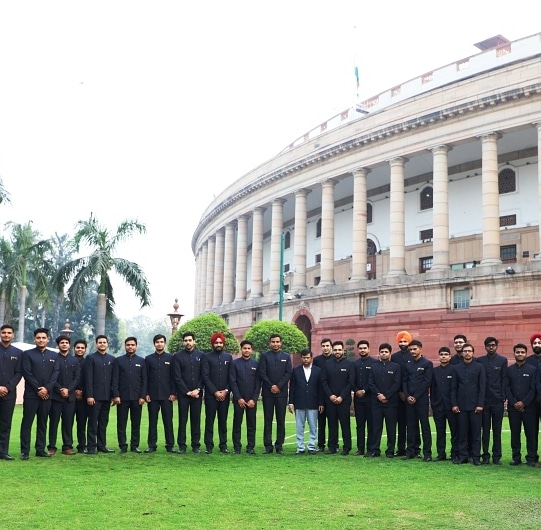
Indian Ordnance Factories Service probationers at parliament of India

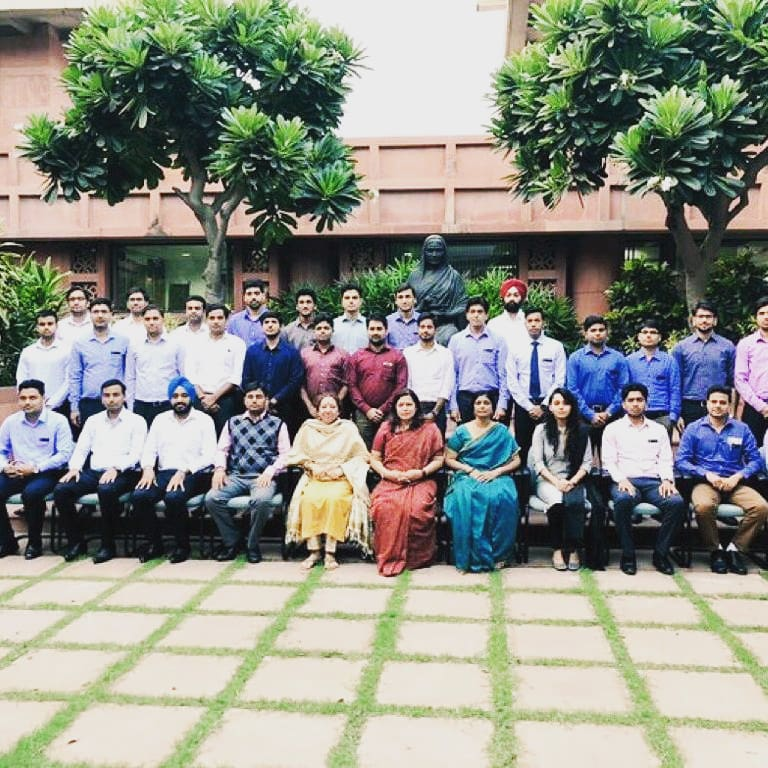
Indian Ordnance Factories Service probationers with Meenakshi Lekhi

Officers are also taken to parliament attachment for one week and the program culminates by meeting with the President of India and Minister of Defence. This training program is in line with training programmes of various other civil services of government of India. The candidates are selected through Civil Services Examination and the Engineering Services Examination, conducted by Union Public Service Commission.

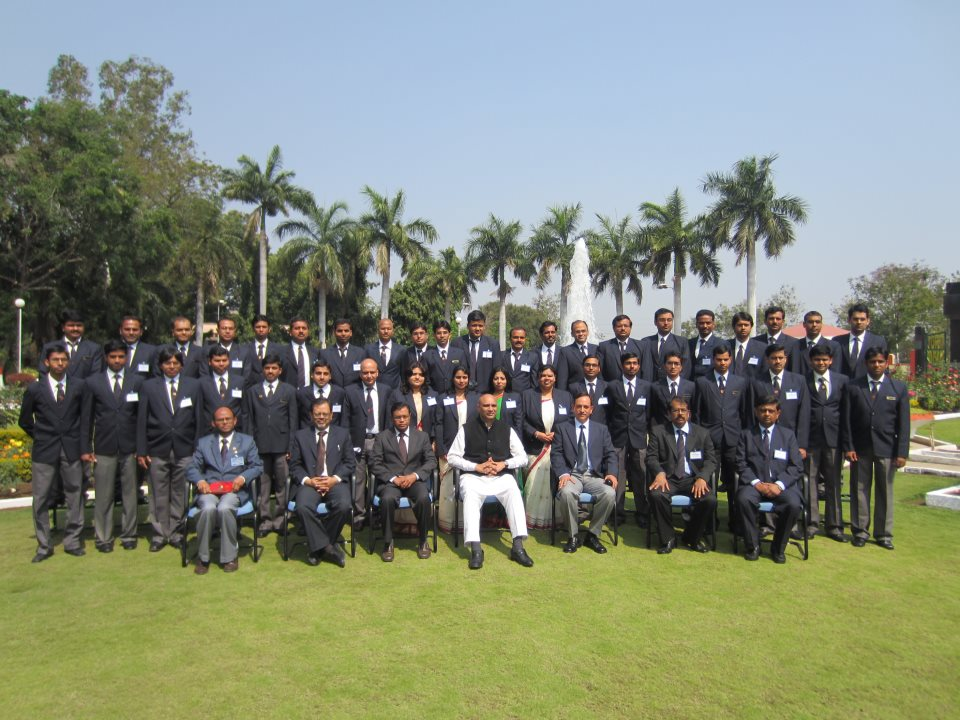
Minister of State for Defence of India M M Pallam Raju with the Indian Ordnance Factories Service (IOFS) probationers at NADP Nagpur

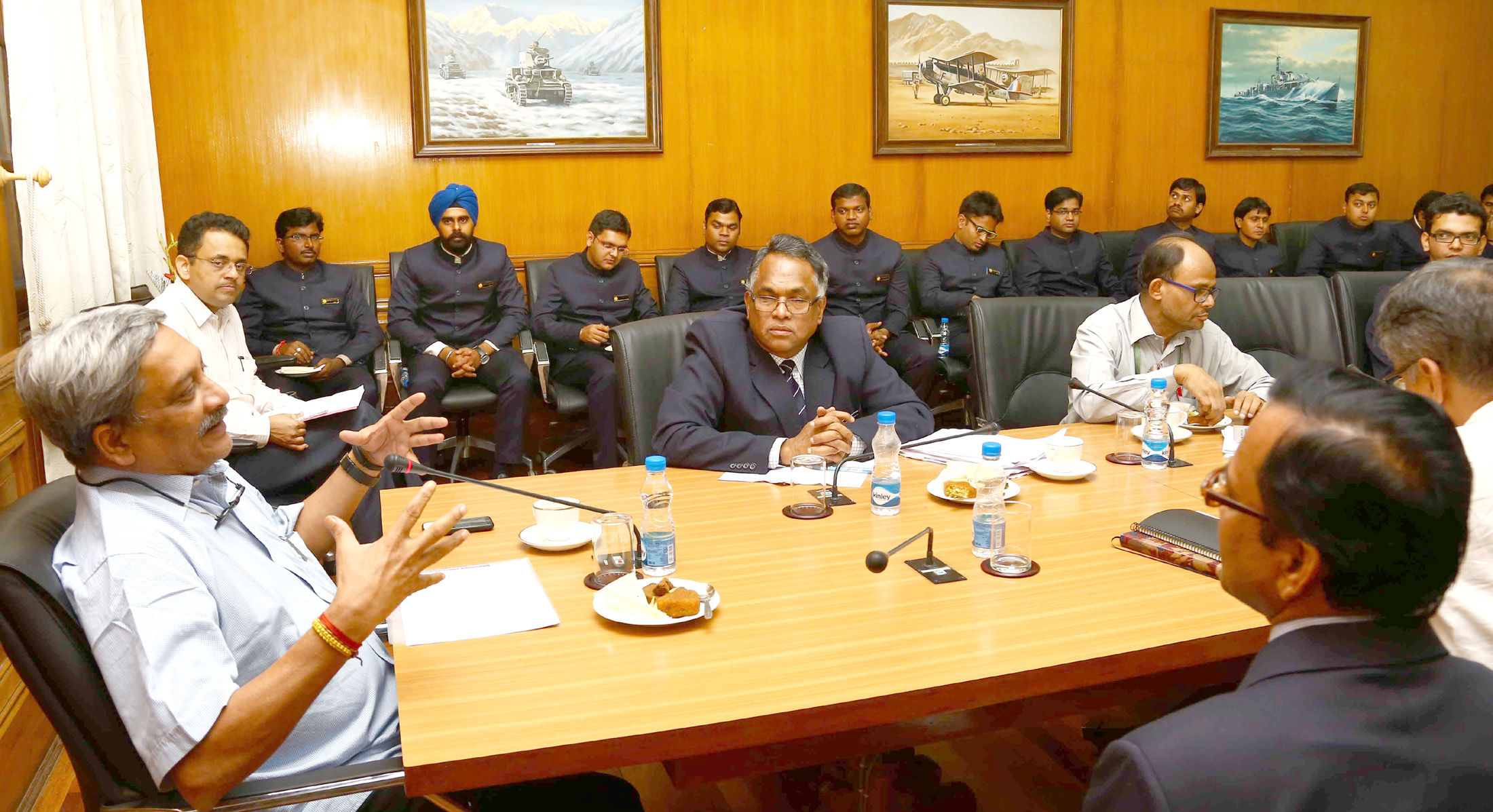
IOFS probationers calling on the Union Minister for Defence, Shri Manohar Parrikar

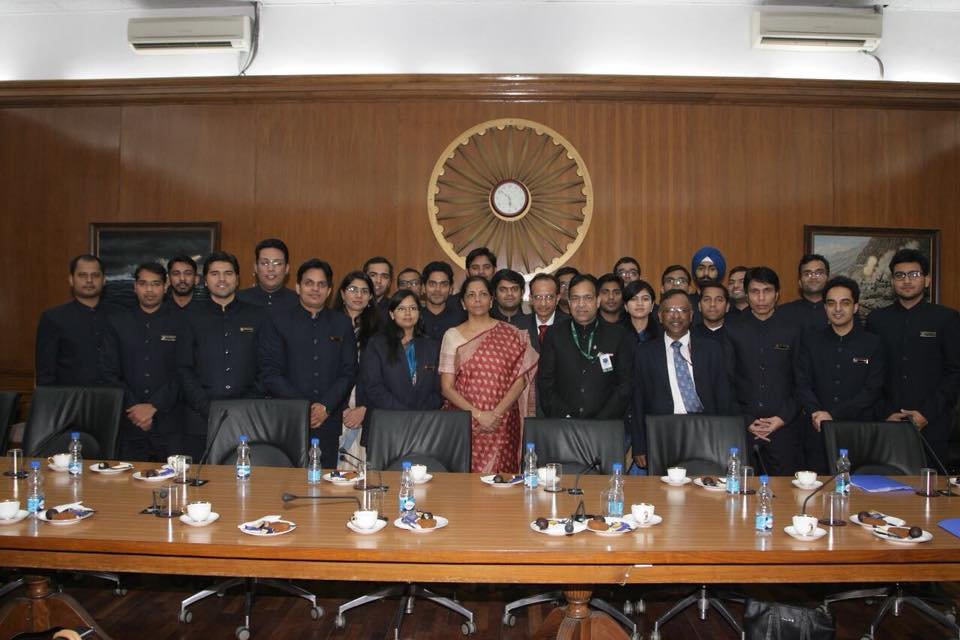
Defence Minister of India, Nirmala Sitharaman with the IOFS probationers at South Block

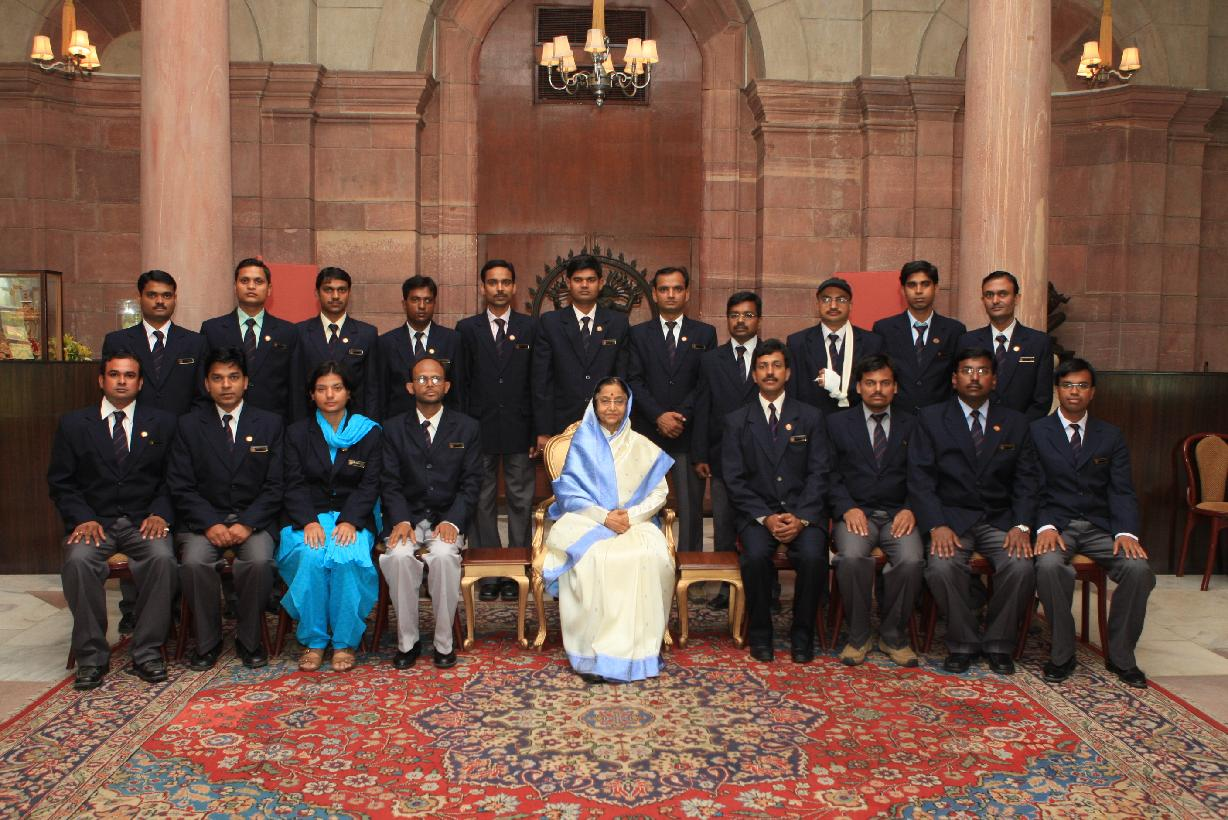
IOFS probationary officers of the 2008 batch, with the President of India, Smt Pratibha Devisingh Patil at Rashtrapati Bhavan

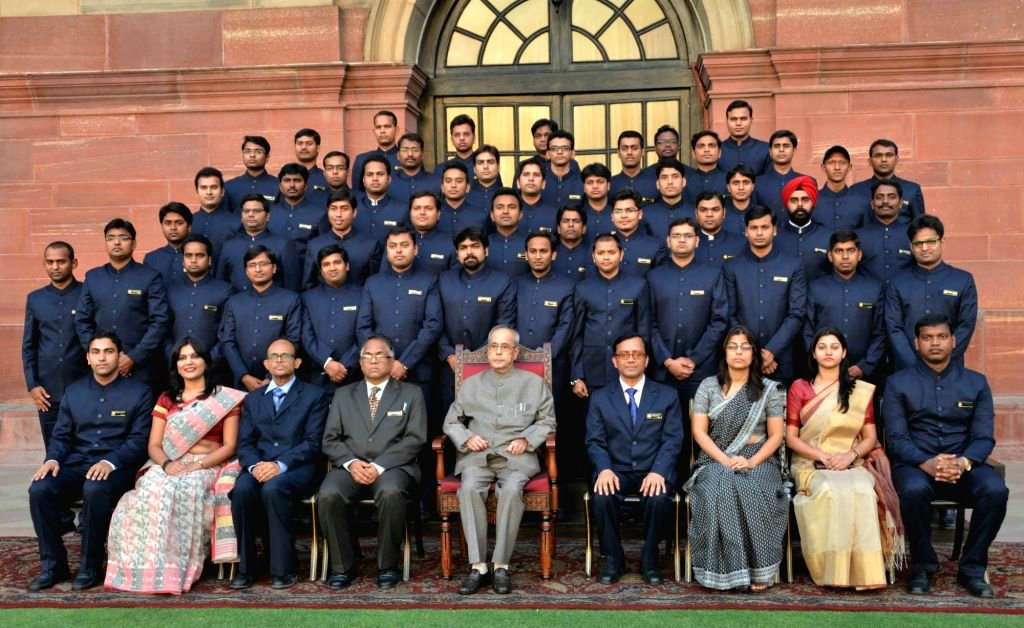

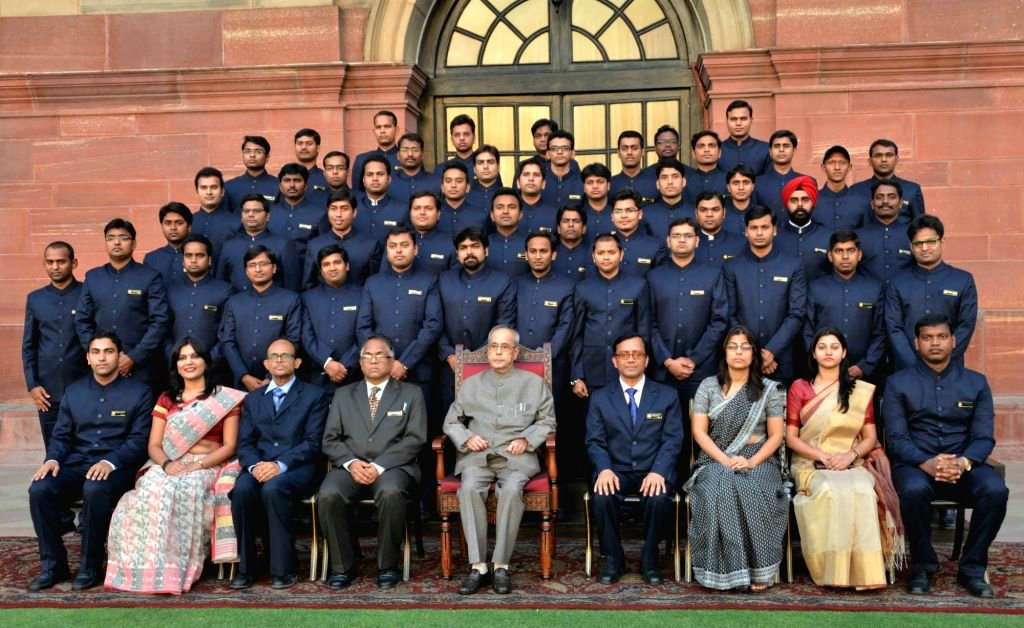

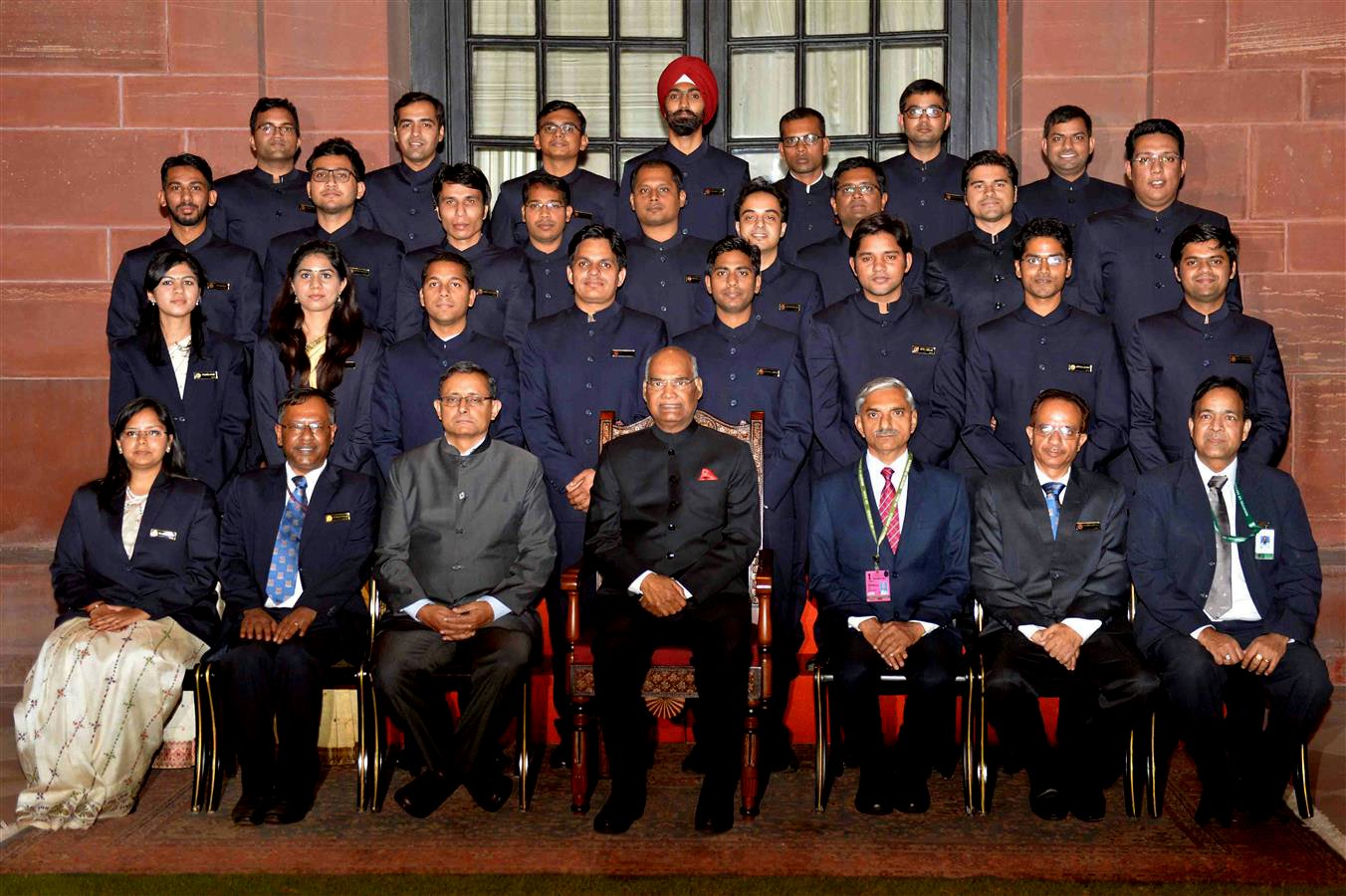
President of India, Shri Ram Nath Kovind with Probationers of Indian Ordnance Factories Service (IOFS) from National Academy of Defence Production at Rashtrapati Bhavan on November 13, 2017

== Facilities ==
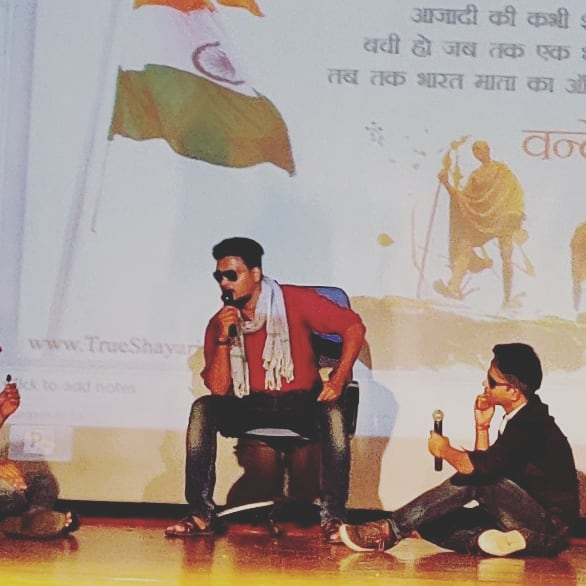
Dramatics by probationers on independence day 2018

The institute is well equipped with training facilities. It includes audio-video teaching aids, a fully computerized library and subscriptions to various periodicals relevant to the training programme. There is a 35-node LAN network inside campus for internet access. The exhibition center has a number of ammunition devices and defense technologies on display for the probationary officers. There is a yoga center and courts for various sports such as billiards, badminton, tennis, volleyball and table tennis. Various fests are organised by the probationers on a regular basis including sports meets with nearby academies like NADT (National Academy of Direct Taxes). There is a well-equipped gym, swimming pool, indoor badminton court, basketball court and a cricket ground as well. Blood donation camps, PT, self defence training for female officers and cultural programmes are organised regularly.
