= Indian National Committee for Space Research =

Former space agency

- Bhāratīya Rāṣṭrīya Aṃtarikṣa Anusaṃdhāna Samiti

Space agency overview
- Formed: 1962; 64 years ago
- Dissolved: August 15, 1969; 56 years ago
- Superseding Space agency: ISRO
- Minister responsible: Prime Minister of India
- Space agency executive: Vikram Sarabhai, Chairman
- Parent department: Department of Atomic Energy

The Indian National Committee for Space Research (INCOSPAR) was established by India's first prime minister Pandit Jawaharlal Nehru under the Department of Atomic Energy (DAE) in 1962, on the suggestion of the scientist Dr. Vikram Sarabhai, recognising the need in space research. It committed to formulate the Indian Space Programme. At the time, the committee was part of the Tata Institute of Fundamental Research. The committee took over the responsibilities of the DAE in space science and research. The then director of the DAE, Homi Bhabha, was instrumental in creation of the committee.

INCOSPAR decided to set up Thumba Equatorial Rocket Launching Station (TERLS) at Thumba on the southern tip of India. Indian Ordnance Factories Service (IOFS) officers were drawn from the Indian Ordnance Factories to harness their knowledge of propellants and advanced light materials used to build rockets. H.G.S. Murthy, an IOFS officer, was appointed the first director of the Thumba Equatorial Rocket Launching Station, where sounding rockets were fired, marking the start of upper atmospheric research in India. An indigenous series of sounding rockets named Rohini was subsequently developed and started undergoing launches from 1967 onwards. Waman Dattatreya Patwardhan, another IOFS officer, developed the propellant for the rockets. A. P. J. Abdul Kalam (who later became the President of India) was amongst the initial team of rocket engineers forming the INCOSPAR.

On 15 August 1969, INCOSPAR was superseded by ISRO.

== See also ==
- ISRO
- Space industry of India
