= Military Engineer Services (India) =

Military infrastructure organisation

- Formation: 26 September 1923
- Type: Government Organisation
- Location: New Delhi
- Region served: India
- Engineer-In-Chief: Lt. Gen. Arvind Walia
- Director General (Personnel): IDSE Lal Chand Meena Military Engineer Services
- Staff: Indian Engineering Services Examination for Group 'A' IDSE Post & Staff Selection Commission JE Exam for Group 'B' Post For Civilian Component & SSC CHSL, CGL AND MTS EXAM FOR Administrative Staff of MES.
- Website: www.mes.gov.in

The Military Engineer Services (MES) is an inter-service organization with military and civilian components of its officers and subordinate staff. MES is one of the oldest and largest government defence infrastructure-development agencies in India. Construction work is done with contracts, but maintenance is conducted by departmentally-employed labour (DEL) and contracts. MES is primarily employed in engineering and construction for the Indian Armed Forces, including the Army, Navy, Air Force, the Ordnance Factory Board, and the DRDO. It is also involved in complex projects, including hospitals, airfields, buildings, workshops, roads, runways, hangars, dockyards, airport terminals, sewage treatment plants, solar plants wharves, and other marine structures. MES has been entrusted with the construction of the Indian National War Memorial.

Indian Army Corps of Engineers officers form the MES' military component. Its civilian component consists of the Indian Defence Service Engineers (IDSE), the Indian Defence Contract Management Service (IDCMS) and Junior Engineer ( JE ) from the Staff Selection Commission ( SSC ). The surveyor, architect and barrack/store cadres are selected through the Indian Engineering Services and the Union Public Service Commission (UPSC).

== History ==
The MES, established as a construction agency during British period, is a civilian organization with officers of the Corps of Engineers of the Indian Army joining as temporary attachments supporting engineering development for the armed forces. Although it was established as a military organization, later converted as civilian engineering organization during British era, army combatant from Corps of Engineer may serve as officers and support staff. The MES is one of India's largest government construction and maintenance organizations, with an annual budget of about ₹13,000 crore. It is responsible for strategic and operational infrastructure such as roads, homes, and offices for all three services and associated organizations of the Ministry of Defence. MES was created and brought under the control of an Engineer-in-Chief on 26 September 1923 by the Secretary of State of India, unifying Royal Corps of Engineers personnel and civilian staff. The Engineer-in-Chief advises the Ministry of Defence and its services on operational and peacetime construction activities. The department is responsible for the design, construction, and maintenance of all Army, Navy, and Air Force infrastructure. It designs works which are executed through contracts under the supervision of officers and staff (qualified civilians and Corps of Engineers officers). To integrate the work, a multi-disciplinary team of civil, electrical, and mechanical engineers, architects, structural designers, quantity surveyors, and contract specialists plan, design, and supervise infrastructure assets. The department's civilian staff is divided into four main categories: engineers, surveyors, architects (all qualified engineers), and administrative staff.

The organisation was created over 200 years ago to maintain civilian and military infrastructure. It was part of the army as the Public Works Department (PWD), controlled by the Indian Corps of Engineers (in turn overseen by a military board), until the 18th century. The PWD was subjected to civilian control in 1851, though it remained responsible for military and civil works. In 1881, the PWD's military-related works were segregated and transferred to the military department under a director general (a rank created in 1889). A 1919–1920 Army of India committee allocated military works to the quartermaster general, and sapper/miner-related works to the Chief of the General Staff. These were combined under an Engineer-in-Chief in September 1923.

MES Day is celebrated on 26 September every year. Its 90th anniversary was celebrated on 26 September 2012, with the theme "Cementing a Bond with Users".

=== Forerunners ===
Civil and military engineering services in India began as military service. When the East India Company extended and consolidated its rule of India during the 18th and 19th centuries, the army's engineering requirements superseded those of other departments.

The first group of engineers in India was formed in 1748 in the Madras Army. From 1776 to 1818, sappers and miners existed in the Bengal Army; they were organized on 19 February 1819 in six companies. On 1 April 1862, they were combined with the Royal Engineers of the British Indian Army.

As conditions stabilized, the Public Works Department was formed under a military board staffed by members of the Indian Corps of Engineers and was military. As civil works became more important, civil engineers were increasingly employed and provincial governments became dissatisfied with military control of civilian works. The Public Works Department came under civilian control in 1851, with no separate department for military works. Due to an 1860 increase in civil works, many civil engineers were engaged and the military began to lose control of its works. The Special Military Works Branch of the Public Works Department was given responsibility for major works by 1871 and was placed under military control ten years later. In 1889, the Military Works Department was responsible for all military works; entirely military by 1899, it was staffed by Royal Engineers. The organization was first renamed "Military Works Services" and then renamed "Military Engineer Services" in 1923.

The senior Royal Engineer officer was known as the Director-General of Public Works until 1921 when the position's title was changed to Director of Works. On 4 December 1923, the position of Engineer in Chief was created to control both branches of military engineers (sappers, miners and combat troops and the Military Engineer Services).

== Military officers (Corps of Engineers) ==
Corps of Engineers officers military junior engineers and clerical staff form the MES' military cadre.

== Indian Defence Contract Management Service ==
The Indian Defence Contract Management Service (IDCMS) is a civil service of the government of India. The IDCMS is a gazette group of civilian officers under the Ministry of Defence which is responsible for all financial matters, including procurement, tendering, contract management, dispute resolution, arbitration, and quantity surveying.

MES hierarchy
Grade	Rank	Designation	Basic Salary per Months
Junior Time Scale	Assistant Executive Engineer	Assistant Director	₹56,100
Senior Time Scale	Executive Engineer	Deputy Director	₹67,700
Senior Time Scale (Non-functional)	Executive Engineer (NFSG)	Joint Director	₹78,800
Junior Administrative Grade (Functional)	Superintending Engineer	Director	₹123,100
Senior Administrative Grade	Chief Engineer	Joint Director-General	₹144,200
Higher Administrative Grade	Additional Director General	ADG Arbitration	₹182,200

== Cadres ==
Architect-cadre officers, responsible for producing architectural drawings of buildings and other structures, are posted as deputy architects and promoted to additional director general (Arch.) The barrack-service cadre is as old as MES, although it remained under the control of its respective station commanders before independence. The Barrack Organization (BO) was introduced in 1946 to develop a barrack department patterned on that of the British Army and eventually place it under the Indian Army Service Corps. Special Army Order 5/S/48 was issued, authorizing the establishment of the Barrack Service by the MES. After a 1949 review, a Memorandum of Procedure, Organization, and Duties of Barrack Services was issued in July of that year. Barrack Services was given responsibility for revenue duties, and billing was transferred from the station commander to the BO. The Barrack & Store Branch provides barrack services in addition to procuring, accounting, stocking and preserving, and issuing stores for work and maintenance. Barrack services include building maintenance and rent and utility billing.

== Zones ==
MES has over six hundred stations across India's mainland and island territories to provide engineering support to Army, Air Force and Navy formations and the Defence Research and Development Organisation (DRDO). It consists of the following zones:

CCE (Army) No. 1 Dinjan	CCE (Army) No. 2 Missamari	CCE (Army) No. 3 Narangi
CCE (COD) New Delhi	CCE (NEP) Chabua	CE (AF) Prayagraj
CE (AF) Bangalore	CE (AF) Gandhinagar	CE (AF) Nagpur
CE (AF) Shillong	CE (AF) Udhampur	CE (AF) WAC PALAM
CE (FY) Hyderabad	CE Andaman & Nicobar	CE Bareilly
CE Bathinda	CE Bhopal	CE Chandigarh
CE Chennai	CE Delhi	CE (AF) Gorakhpur
CE Jabalpur	CE Jaipur	CE Jalandhar
CE Jodhpur	CE Kolkata	CE Leh
CE Lucknow	CE NAVY Kochi	CE NAVY Mumbai
CE NAVY Visakhapatnam	CE Pathankot	CE Pune
CE RD Delhi	CE RD Secunderabad	CE SE FALLS Shillong
CE Siliguri	CE Srinagar	CE Udhampur
DGNP Mumbai	DGNP Visakhapatnam	National War Museum and Memorial
CE (CG) Visakhapatnam	CE (CG) Goa	

- CE- Chief Engineer
- CCE- Chief Construction Engineer
- CE (AF)- Chief Engineer (Air Force)
- CE (CG)- Chief Engineer (Coast Guard)
- CE (RD)- Chief Engineer (Research and development)
- DGNP- Director General Naval Projects

== See also ==
- Indian Engineering Services
- UPSC
