= Indian Ordnance Factories Service =

Administrative civil service of India

Service Overview
Abbreviation	I.O.F.S.
Formed	1935; 91 years ago
Country	India
Training Ground	National Academy of Defence Production
Controlling Authority	Ministry of Defence; Department of Defence Production
Legal personality	Governmental; Civil Service
General nature	Research & Development; General Management; Public Administration; Defence Production
Cadre Size	1760 members
Association	IOFS Officers' Association (IOFSOA)
Service colour	Red, Navy Blue and Sky Blue

Service Chief
- Sudhir Srivastava, Director General Ordnance (Co-ordination & Services), Department of Defence Production

Head of the Civil Services
- T.V. Somanathan, Cabinet Secretary

The Indian Ordnance Factories Service (IOFS) is a civil service of the Government of India. IOFS officers are Gazetted (Group A) defence-civilian officers under the Ministry of Defence. They are responsible for the administration of the Indian Ordnance Factories, which provide the indigenous defence production capabilities of India.

== Composition ==
During the colonial times, the administrative service of Ordnance was known as the Indian Ordnance Service. It was constituted in the year 1935. It had only European officers in the years that followed. Only engineering graduates from the University of Cambridge, University of Oxford, etc., were allowed to appear in the examination. They had to undergo specialised training prior to joining the service. In 1939, there was only one Indian officer and the remaining forty-four officers were of European origin.

IOFS was reconstituted in its present form in 1954 with the cadre controlling authority of the Ministry of Defence – Department of Defence Production, with a cadre size of 1760 posts. The source of recruitment was through direct recruitment 60%; by promotion 40% and no lateral entries.

IOFS is a multi-disciplinary composite cadre consisting of technical – engineers (civil, electrical, mechanical, electronics), technologists (aerospace, automotive, marine, industrial/product design, computer, nuclear, optical, chemical, metallurgical, textile, leather) and non-technical/administrative (science, law, commerce, management and arts graduates). Technical posts account for about 87% of the total cadre. The doctors (surgeons and physicians) serving in OFB belong to a separate service known as the Indian Ordnance Factories Health Service (IOFHS). IOFHS officers are responsible for the maintenance of health of the employees, and the hospitals of OFB. They report directly to the IOFS officers. IOFS and IOFHS are the only two civil services under the Department of Defence Production.

== OFB's background ==
Ordnance Factory Board is engaged in research, development, production, testing, marketing and logistics of a comprehensive product range in the areas of air, land and sea systems. It comprises forty-one Ordnance Factories, nine Training Institutes, three Regional Marketing Centres and four Regional Controllerates of Safety, which are spread all across the country.

OFB is the world's largest government operated production organisation, and the oldest organisation run by the Government of India. It has a total workforce of about 164,000. It is often called the "Fourth Arm of Defence", and the "Force Behind the Armed Forces" of India. It is amongst the top 50 defence equipment manufacturers in the world. Its total sales were at $3 billion (₹ 19982.71 crores) in 2015–'16. Every year, 18 March is celebrated as the Ordnance Factories' Day in India.

== Recruitment ==
The recruitment in the Indian Ordnance Factories as a Group A officer is done by the Union Public Service Commission (UPSC), based on the performance in the Engineering Services Examination (ESE) and the Civil Services Examination (CSE). Engineering posts are filled through the Engineering Services Examination, while technologists are selected through interviews by UPSC. Posts in the non-technical streams are filled through the Civil Services Examination. IOFS is the only cadre in which officials are selected by all four means – CSE, ESE, interviews and promotions. IOFHS officers are selected through the Combined Medical Services Examination, conducted by UPSC. All appointments to the Group A Civil Services are made by the President of India.

== Training ==
National Academy of Defence Production (NADP), Nagpur, provides training to the IOFS officers in areas of technology, management, public administration as induction and re-orientation courses.

The induction training programme of probationary officers is of 64 weeks, comprising technical, managerial and administrative modules of theoretical, practical and field nature. Classes are held at specialised educational institutions across India. Officer Trainees (OTs) are then sent on Bharat Darshan (Tour of India), which includes visits to the nuclear, defence, space, industrial and other technical installations of India. To understand the nuances of bureaucracy, they are familiarised with the functioning of district, state, national and international bodies, including the Parliament of India. Armed Forces attachment with the Army, Navy, Air Force and with the Police, Paramilitary and Special Forces, for better understanding of needs of their customers. To get acquainted with the Indian legal system, they visit the Supreme Court of India. Thus, giving them exposure to all the three arms of the Government of India. Following which, they are sent for on-the-job training to various Ordnance Factories and are expected to apply the knowledge and experience gained. Examinations are held at the end of the training. The training concludes with interactions with the Members of Parliament, Ministers in-charge of the Home, Foreign and Defence ministries, Prime Minister, vice-president and the President of India.

IOFS officers are allowed to continue their higher studies at various national institutions such as the IITs, IIMs, IISc, NITs, NITIE, NDC, DSSC and DIAT, under the sponsored category. They are also trained at these institutes, at the Lal Bahadur Shastri National Academy of Administration, Administrative Staff College of India and the Indian Institute of Public Administration, while in service. The officers are sent to countries which have friendly relations with India, such as the countries of erstwhile USSR, United States, UK, Sweden, Japan, Austria, Germany, Russia, France, Israel, Canada, Czech Republic, South Korea, Singapore etc.

== Functions ==
The main functions performed by IOFS officers while at the Indian Ordnance Factories include product research & development, project management, materials management, production planning and control, quality control, supplies management, industrial safety, labour welfare, personnel management, industrial relations, management and maintenance of residential estates etc.

In discharging these functions, the IOFS officers interact extensively with:

- R&D organisations such as ARAI, BARC, BPRD, CSIR, ISRO, DRDO.
- Quality controlling agencies such as Bureau of Indian Standards, Directorate of Standardisation, Directorate General of Quality Assurance (Army), Directorate General of Naval Armament Inspection (Navy), Directorate General of Aeronautical Quality Assurance (Air Force).
- Inter-Services Organisations such as Military Engineer Services, Defence Exhibition Organisation.
- Educational institutes such as the IITs, IISc, IIMs, Indian Statistical Institutes.
- Public Sector Undertakings of the Ministry of Defence: HAL, BEL, BEML, BDL, MDL, GSL, GRSE, Midhani; other Govt. PSUs; various Indian and foreign, private as well as government companies.
- Industrial and trade associations such as CII, FICCI, ASSOCHAM.
- Ministries such as the Ministry of External Affairs, Ministry of Home Affairs, Ministry of Labour, Ministry of Personnel, Public Grievances and Pensions and others.
- Besides, in order to meet the day-to-day operational requirements of the organisation, fulfill various statutory obligations, and ensure the welfare of the workforce employed in the ordnance factories, these officers also interact with the officers of the Indian Armed Forces, Central Armed Police Forces, State Armed Police Forces, Paramilitary Forces of India, Special Forces of India; and other bureaucrats from IAS, IPS, IFS, IFoS, IA&AS, IDAS, IRS, IRTS, etc.

=== On Deputation ===
IOFS is a participating civil service under the Central Staffing Scheme (CSS), which allows bureaucrats to move to any organisation, commission, institution, agency, department, ministry of the Government of India and the state governments, on deputation basis (excluding posts which are specifically encadred within the organised Group A services), depending on their interests, educational qualifications, seniority, age and other eligibility criteria.

IOFS officers also serve at board-level posts of PSUs and SEZs; as advisors and secretaries to the Union Cabinet Ministers, Prime Minister and the President of India; as diplomats at various consulates, missions and embassies of India, located abroad; as scientists in DRDO; as commissioned officers in the Indian Armed Forces; in the Central Armed Police Forces, in intelligence agencies such as RAW, NATGRID, etc.; and as vigilance officers in various organisations.

== Hierarchy ==
Grade	Designation in the field	Designation in Headquarters	Basic pay
Apex Scale (Pay level 17)	Nil	Director General Ordnance (Co-ordination & Services)	₹225,000 (US$2,300)
Higher Administrative Grade (+) (Pay level 16)	Nil	Addl. Director General Ordnance (Co-ordination & Services)	₹205,400 (US$2,100)—₹224,400 (US$2,300)
Higher Administrative Grade (Pay level 15)	Senior General Manager / Senior Principal Director	Senior Deputy Director General	₹182,200 (US$1,900)—₹224,100 (US$2,300)
Senior Administrative Grade (Pay level 14)	Addl. GM / General Manager / Principal Director / Regional Director / Regional Controller of Safety	Deputy Director General	₹144,200 (US$1,500)—₹218,200 (US$2,300)
Junior Administrative Grade (Functional) (Pay level 13)	Joint General Manager	Director	₹123,100 (US$1,300)—₹215,900 (US$2,200)
Senior Time Scale (Non Functional) (Pay level 12)	Deputy General Manager	Joint Director	₹78,800 (US$820)—₹209,200 (US$2,200)
Senior Time Scale (Pay level 11)	Works Manager	Deputy Director	₹67,700 (US$700)—₹208,700 (US$2,200)
Junior Time Scale (Pay level 10)	Assistant Works Manager	Assistant Director	₹56,100 (US$580)—₹177,500 (US$1,800)

== Notable IOFS officers ==
- Narinder Singh Kapany – Invented fibre optics that revolutionised laparoscopic and endoscopic surgery, telecommunications, power transmission, etc. Named as one of the seven "Unsung Heroes of the 20th century" by Fortune magazine for his Nobel Prize-deserving invention. Known as the "Father of Fibre Optics" and "The Man who Bent Light". Former professor at Stanford, Universities of California at Berkeley, Santa Barbara and Santa Cruz. Had more than 150 patents to his credit. Conferred upon with Padma Vibhushan, the second-highest honour in India, Pravasi Bharatiya Samman, Fellowship of the Royal Academy of Engineering (FREng). He was also offered the post of Scientific Adviser to the Defence Minister of India, by the first Prime Minister of India, Jawaharlal Nehru.
- Mantosh Sondhi - Served as the first General Manager of the Heavy Vehicles Factory, founding Chairman & Managing Director of Bokaro Steel Plant, Member of the Atomic Energy Commission of India. First IOFS officer and first non-IAS officer to hold the posts of Secretary of Ministry of Heavy Industries, Ministry of Steel, Ministry of Mines and Ministry of Coal. Awarded Padma Shri by the President of India, Commander of the Order of the Lion of Finland by the President of Finland. The headquarters of Confederation of Indian Industry is named in his honour. He also served as the Chairman of several MNCs such as Ashok Leyland, ABB, Wärtsilä.
- Nalini Ranjan Mohanty - Secured All India 2nd Rank in the Engineering Services Examination of 1965, served as the Chairman & Managing Director of Hindustan Aeronautics Limited, Director of Kudremukh Iron Ore Company, Mahanadi Coalfields, National Aluminium Company (NALCO), Bharat Earth Movers (BEML). Awarded Padma Shri in 2004 by the Government of India for his role in the development of LCA – Tejas.
- H. P. S. Ahluwalia – First Indian to climb Mount Everest. Author, mountaineer, social worker. Founder & Chairman of Indian Spinal Injuries Centre. Conferred on with the Arjuna Award, Padma Shri and Padma Bhushan by the Government of India, Fellowship of Royal Geographical Society (FRGS). Also served as a Commissioned officer in the Indian Army and Member of Planning Commission (India).
- Santu Jouharmal Shahaney - Served as the first Indian Director General Ordnance Factories (DGOF). He was awarded Padma Shri in 1962, and Padma Bhushan in 1965, by the Government of India, in the Civil Service category, for his contributions during the Indo-China War of 1962 and the Indo-Pakistani War of 1965, respectively.
- R. M. Muzumdar - Second Indian Director General of the Indian Ordnance Factories. He was awarded the Padma Bhushan by the Government of India, in 1973, in the Civil service category, for his contributions during the Indo-Pakistani War of 1971
- Waman Dattatreya Patwardhan - Developed the solid propellant for India's first space rocket launched from Thumba, and the detonation system of India's first nuclear bomb used in Operation Smiling Buddha. Served at the Ammunition Factory Khadki, and as the first Director of High Energy Materials Research Laboratory (HEMRL) and the Armaments Research and Development Establishment (ARDE) of the Defence Research and Development Organisation (DRDO). Awarded Padma Shri in 1974.
- H. G. S. Murthy - Known as one of the "Seven Pioneers of the Indian Space Programme". He served at the Machine Tool Prototype Factory (MTPF), Ambernath, and as the first Director of the Thumba Equatorial Rocket Launching Station (TERLS), and the Space Science & Technology Centre, now known as the Vikram Sarabhai Space Centre, of the Indian Space Research Organisation (ISRO). Awarded Padma Shri in 1969.
- K. C. Banerjee - Received Padma Shri in 1967, for his contributions during the Indo-Pakistani War of 1965, as the General Manager of Rifle Factory Ishapore, that developed and manufactured the 7.62 Self-Loading Automatic Rifle, that played decisive role in India's victory in the Indo-Pakistani War of 1965.
- O. P. Bahl - Received Padma Shri in 1972, in the civil-service category, as the General Manager of Ammunition Factory Khadki, which developed and manufactured the anti-submarine rockets used in sinking the submarine PNS Ghazi during the Indo-Pakistani War of 1971.

== Gallery ==
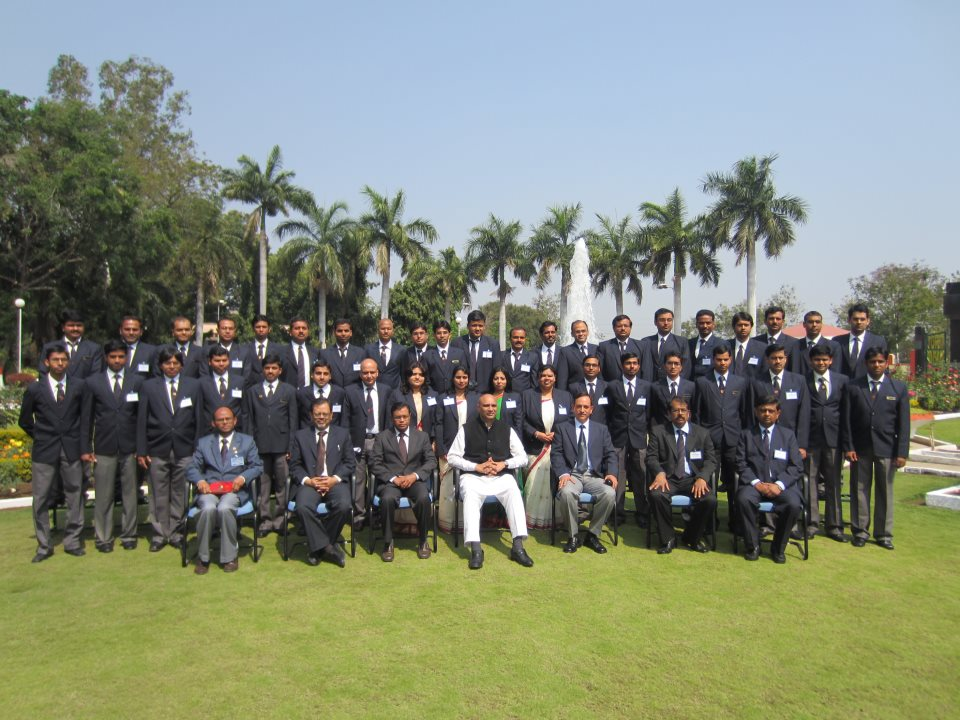
Minister of State for Defence of India, M M Pallam Raju, with the Indian Ordnance Factories Service (IOFS) probationers at NADP Nagpur

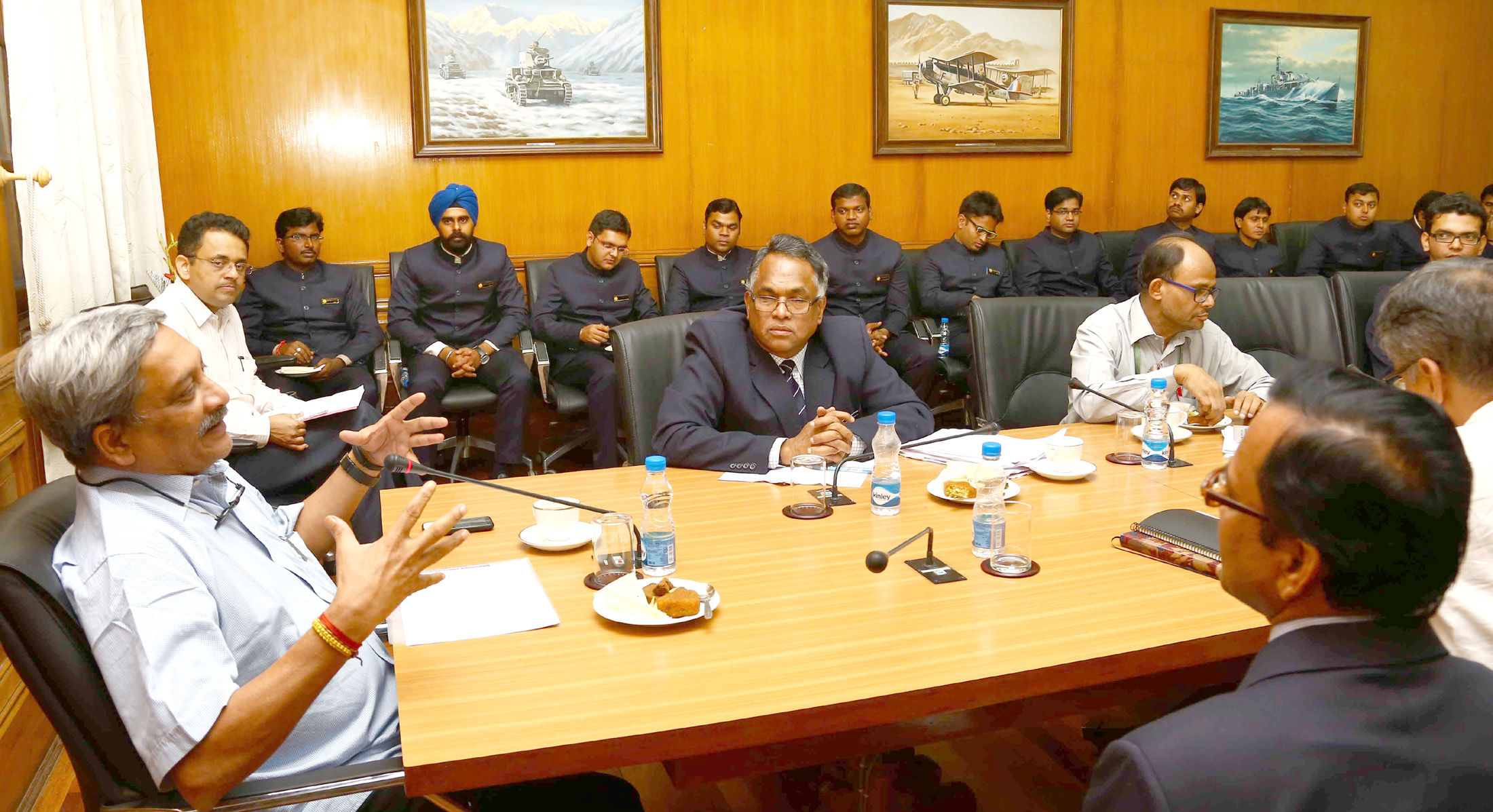
IOFS probationers calling on the Union Minister for Defence, Shri Manohar Parrikar

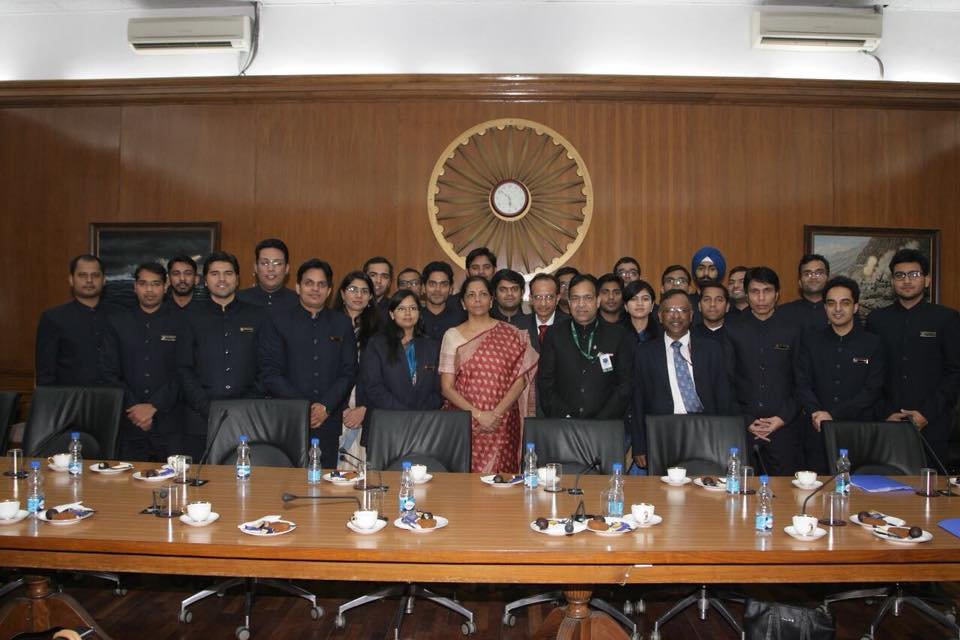
Defence Minister of India, Nirmala Sitharaman, with the IOFS probationers at South Block

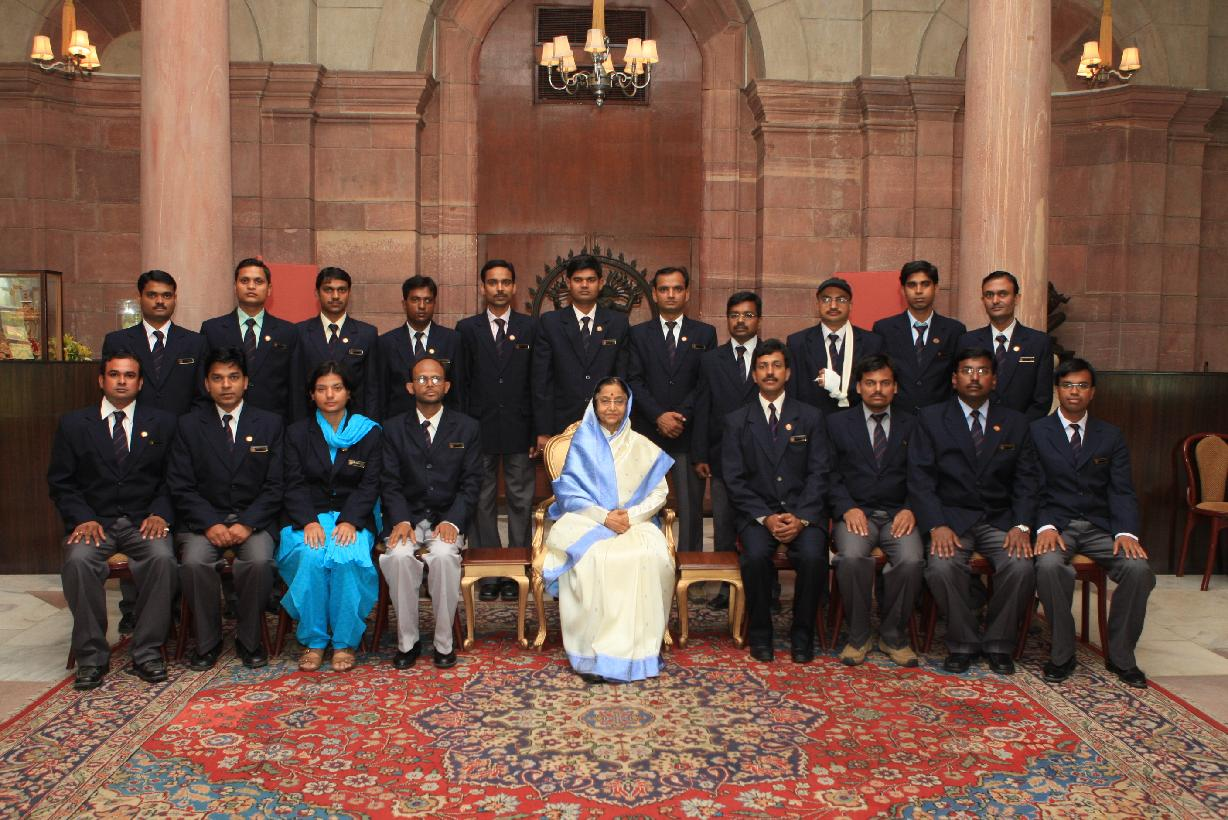
IOFS probationary officers of the 2008 batch, with the President of India, Smt. Pratibha Devisingh Patil, at Rashtrapati Bhavan

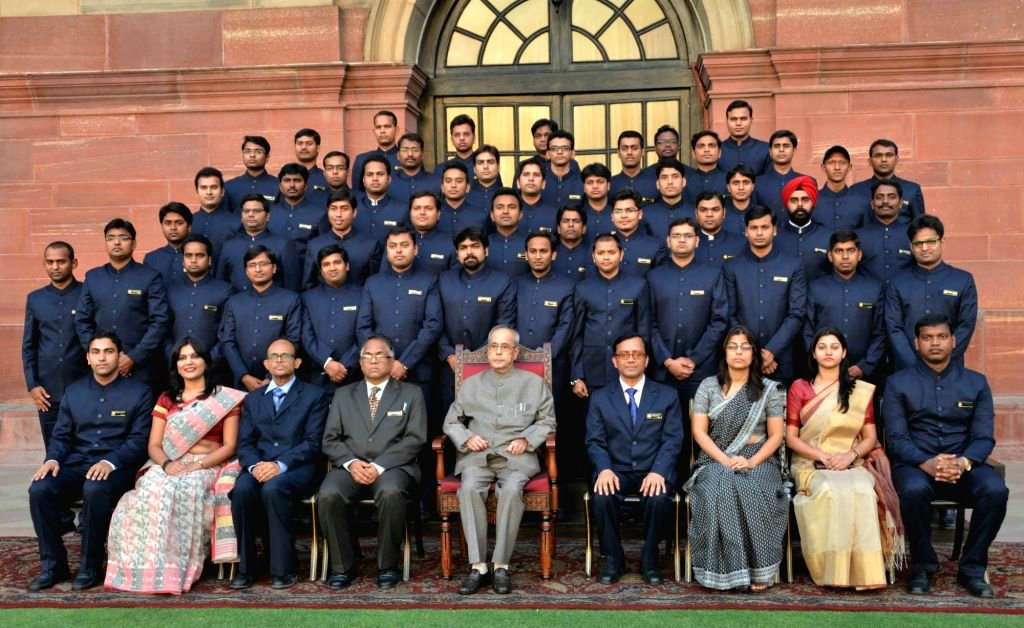
President of India, Shri Pranab Mukherjee, in a group photograph with the Probationers of Indian Ordnance Factories Service (IOFS) 2014 (II) Batch and 2015 (I & II) Batches from the National Academy of Defence Production, Nagpur

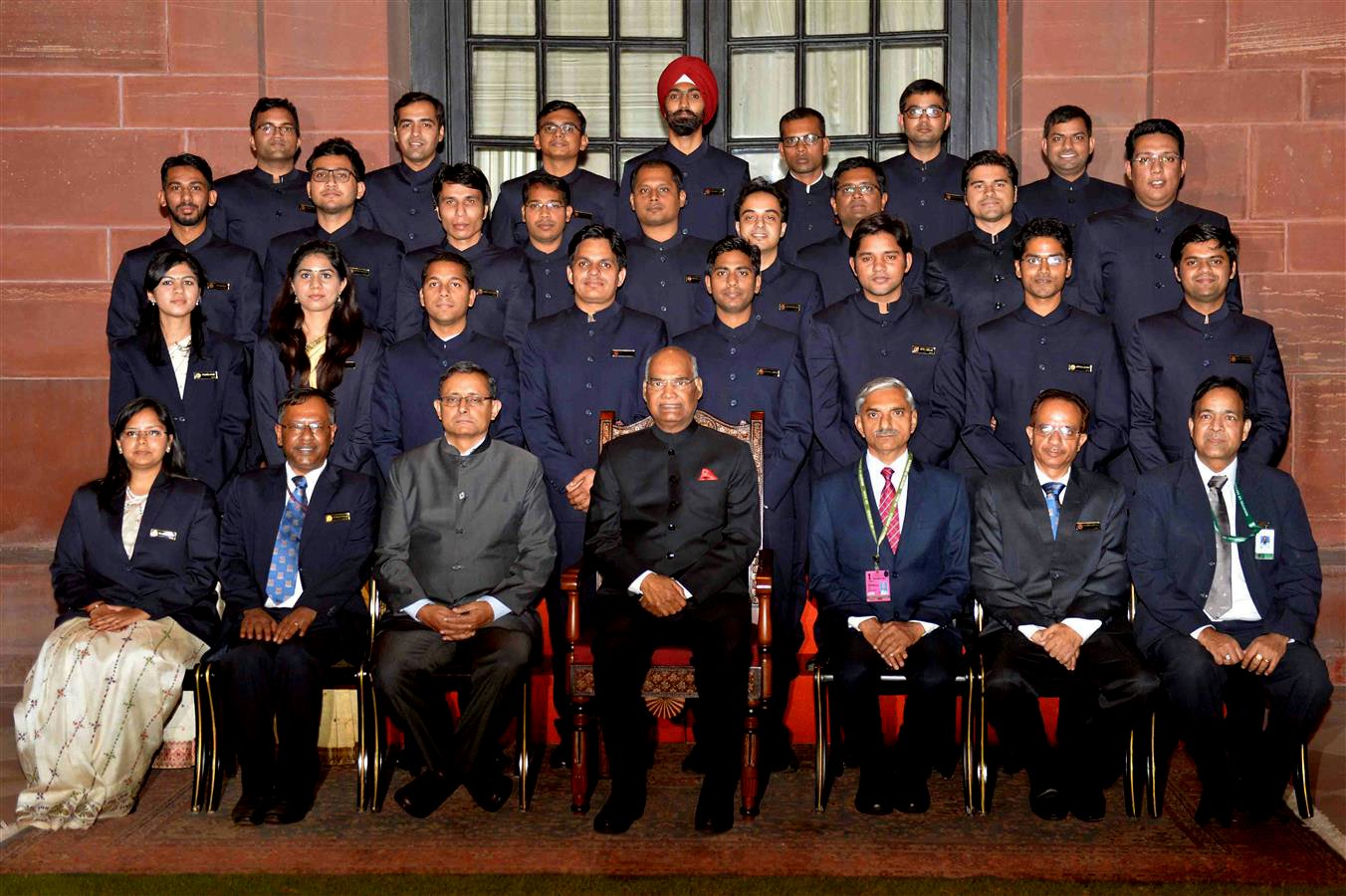
President of India, Shri Ram Nath Kovind, with Probationers of Indian Ordnance Factories Service (IOFS) from National Academy of Defence Production at Rashtrapati Bhavan on November 13, 2017

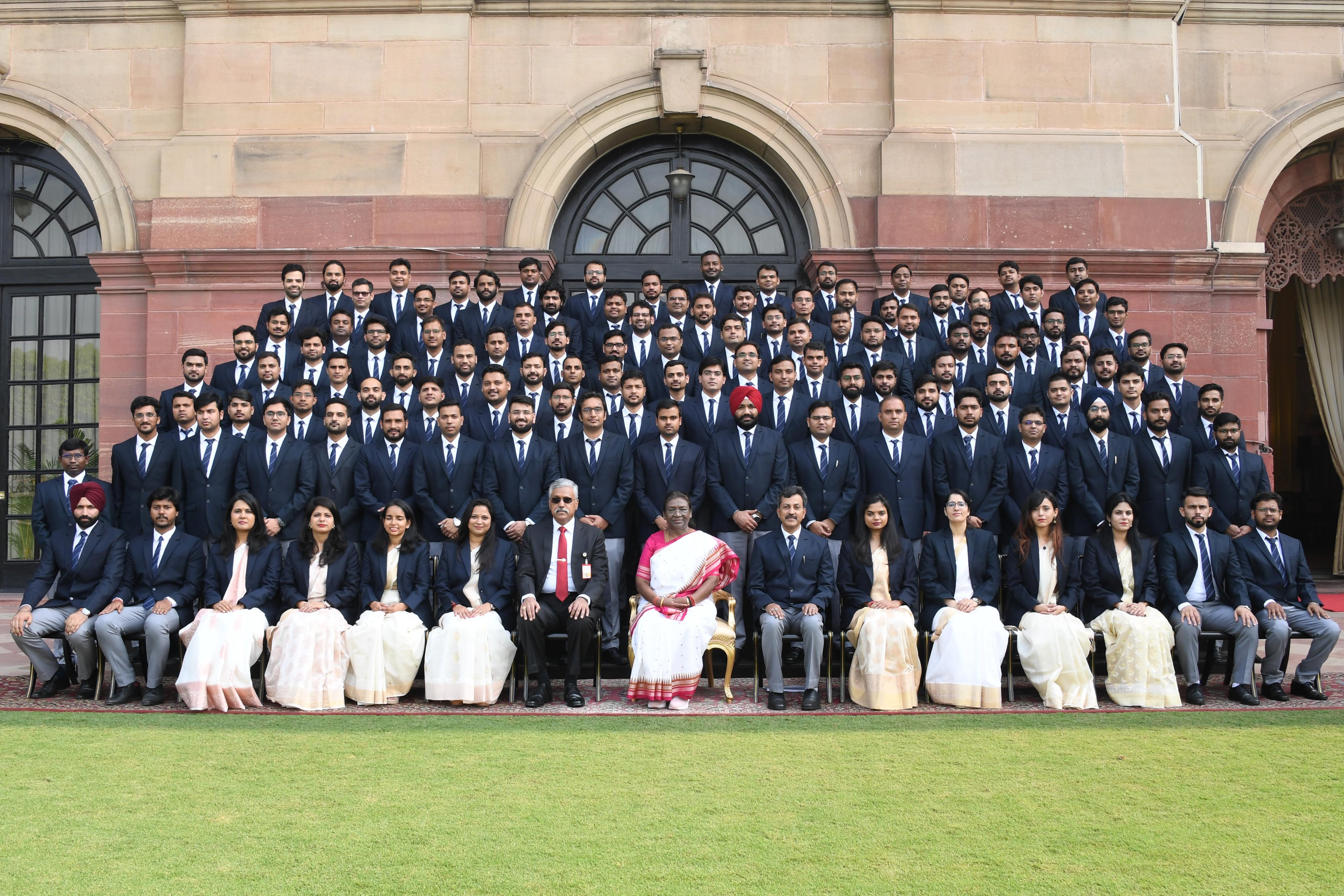
Officers of Indian Ordnance Factories Service (IOFS) called on the President of India Droupadi Murmu at Rashtrapati Bhavan on November 17, 2023

== See also ==
- Ordnance Factory Board
