= Abhai Sinha =

- Born: 30 June 1958 (age 68)
- Education: IIT Roorkee
- Occupation: Civil engineer

Abhai Sinha is an Indian Engineering Service (IES) officer, the former Director General of the Central Public Works Department, India (CPWD) and Principal Technical Advisor to the Government of India. He is responsible to the Ministry of Urban Development for the efficient administration and overall professional control of Public Works within the jurisdiction of CPWD. Under the leadership of Abhai Sinha, CPWD recorded a workload of Rs. 12,200 cr during 2016–17.

== Early life ==
Sinha was born on 30 June 1958. He received a bachelor's degree in civil engineering from the IIT Roorkee in 1978. He joined CPWD as an engineer in 1980.
