= Nalini Ranjan Mohanty =

Indian technocrat

- Born: 8 November 1944 (age 81); Odisha, India
- Occupations: Bureaucrat, Technocrat
- Years active: Since 1965
- Known for: Public sector management
- Awards: Padma Shri; Ruchi Prativa Samman

Nalini Ranjan Mohanty is a retired IOFS officer and former Chairman & Managing Director of the Hindustan Aeronautics Limited (HAL). He is a former president of the Aeronautical Society of India (ASI) and has been the chairman and managing director of Textron India. A Fellow of the ASI and the Institution of Engineers (India), Mohanty received the Ruchi Prativa Samman in 2003. The Government of India awarded him the fourth-highest civilian honour of the Padma Shri, in 2004, for his contributions to Indian industrial sector.

== Biography ==
Mohanty was born on 8 November 1944 in the Indian state of Odisha, joined the Regional Engineering College, Rourkela (present day National Institute of Technology) from where he graduated in mechanical engineering (BTech Hons) in 1965. The same year, he joined NIT as a member of faculty and, later, resigned from there to join the Indian Ordnance Factories Service (IOFS) after securing the second rank in the All India Engineering Services Examination,. As an IOFS officer, he worked in several ordnance factories in India including Gun Carriage Factory, Jabalpur and the Heavy Vehicles Factory, Avadi, and, in 1971, joined Hindustan Aeronautics Limited where he rose through ranks to become its chairman in 2001, the second civilian to hold the post. Three years later, he superannuated from HAL and, in 2007, joined Textron India, the Indian subsidiary of the American conglomerate and the parent company of Bell Helicopters and Cessna Aircraft.

Mohanty has served in many Public sector undertakings in India such as Kudremukh Iron Ore Company, Mahanadi Coalfields, Dynamatic Technologies, National Aluminium Company, Bharat Earth Movers and Sankhya Infotech in the capacity of non-executive director. He has chaired two joint ventures, the Indo-Russian Aviation Limited and the British Aerospace-Hindustan Aeronautics Software Limited. He was a member of the Kelkar Committee, headed by Vijay Kelkar, which examined the private sector participation in defence production, and served the Society of Defence Technologists (SODET) as its chairman. He is a former vice president of the Aeronautical Society of India (ASI) and is a Fellow of the Society. He is also a Fellow of the Institution of Engineers (India). He received Ruchi Prativa Samman in 2003 and the Government of India included him in the 2004 Republic Day Honours list for the civilian award of the Padma Shri.

== See also ==
- Indian Ordnance Factories Service
