= Central Power Engineering Service =

CPES is a government owned public sector power sector enterprise

- State Emblem of India

- Flag of India

Formally constituted in 1965 (61 years ago), Central Power Engineering Service (CPES) is a Group-A & Group- B Central Engineering Services under the administrative control of Ministry of Power (MoP) in India. CPES is the only organized Service under Ministry of Power. It deals with Indian Power sector which is one of the most complex and diverse in the world owing to vast geography, terrains, climatic condition, natural resources available in India.

== Recruitment ==
CPES officers are recruited for the Group-A & Group-B posts on the basis of Engineering Services Examination (ESE) conducted annually by Union Public Service Commission (UPSC). Total Sanctioned Cadres strength of the cadre is 541; with Group A strength of 432 and Gr B with 109.

== Training ==
CPES Officers are provided training at Induction level at National Power Training Institute (NPTI) Faridabad for a period of minimum 34 weeks covering various modules on the subjects/ areas like Regulations, Thermal Power, Hydro Power, Transmission, Load dispatch, Renewable, Secretariat training on office procedures and Management training etc. On Job Training is also conducted at Thermal Power Stations, Hydro Power Stations, Sub Stations, Transmission lines, Load Dispatch Centres, Solar Power Parks, Wind Power Stations at various locations in the country. NPTI has been designated as Cadre Training Institute for CPES.

== Allocation of Wing/Division/Circle/other units to officers ==
A candidate recommended by UPSC reports to Central Electricity Authority after his/her allocation to Central Power Engineering Service, to join at the post of Assistant Director/ Assistant Executive Engineer. CEA is an attached office of Ministry of Power and statutory body under the Electricity Act 2003. CEA formulates technical standards of Indian power sector. Ministry invariably seeks advice of CEA almost in all techno-economic matters. Further, some of the officers at various levels are posted at Ministry of Power (main), four Regional Power Survey Offices (RPSOs), five Regional Power Committees (RPCs) and five Regional Inspectorate Offices (RIOs) located at New Delhi, Mumbai, Chennai, Bengaluru, Kolkata and Shillong. CPES has encadred SAG level posts (Board Members) at Krishna River Management Board (KRMB), Godavari River Management Board (GRMB) and Polavaram Project Authority (PPA) with postings at Hyderabad.

== Role of Officers ==
CPES officers play roles, amidst growing challenges, for the development and management of Power Sector of the country. Some of these are as follows

1. Formulation of National Electricity Plan and National Electricity Policy

2. Thermal Project Monitoring

3. Hydro Power Engineering and Development

4. Hydro Project Concurrence and monitoring

5. Thermal Power Engineering and Technology Development

6. Transmission Planning, appraisal and Monitoring

7. Power System Engineering and Technology Development

8. Management of country's resources pertaining to Power Sector

9. Research and Development in Power Sector

10. Providing technical advice to Central Govt, State Govts, Electricity Regulatory Commissions (CERC and SERCs) and other agencies in the Power Sector

11. Distribution Planning, Development and Monitoring

12. Grid management and formulating various regulation for Power Sector

13. Strive to provide affordable and quality power for all

== Career Progression ==
According to 2015 Recruitment Rules of CPES cadre an officer inducted at Group ‘A’ is expected to put in minimum 4 years of service at JTS level, and 5 years at STS level before his/her promotion to the level of Junior Administrative Grade/ Non Functional Selection Grade (JAG/ NFSG) level. Officers recruited at Group ‘B’ level need to serve minimum 2 regular years to be eligible for promotion to Group ‘A’ level.

The Career Progression framework has been shown in the table below:

Ranks, designations, and positions held in Central Electricity Authority and allied engineering services
Grade / Scale (Level on Pay Matrix)	Posting / Designation	Position in Government of India	Position in Order of precedence in India	Pay Scale (Basic Pay)
Apex Scale (Pay Level 17)	Chairperson, Central Electricity Authority	Secretary	23	₹225,000 (US$2,300)
Higher Administrative Grade (Pay Level 15)	Principal Chief Engineer	Additional Secretary	25	₹182,200 (US$1,900)—₹224,100 (US$2,300)
Senior Administrative Grade (Pay Level 14)	Member Secretary / Chief Electrical Inspector / Chief Engineer Member (KRMB / GRMB / PPA)	Joint Secretary	26	₹144,200 (US$1,500)—₹218,200 (US$2,300)
Junior Administrative Grade (Pay Level 13)	Director / Superintending Engineer	Director		₹123,100 (US$1,300)—₹215,900 (US$2,200)
Non-Functional Selection Grade (Pay Level 12)	Deputy Director / Executive Engineer	Deputy Secretary		₹78,800 (US$820)—₹209,200 (US$2,200)
Senior Time Scale (Pay Level 11)	Deputy Director / Executive Engineer	Under Secretary		₹67,700 (US$700)—₹208,700 (US$2,200)
Junior Time Scale (Pay Level 10)	Assistant Director Grade-I / Assistant Executive Engineer Entry-level	Assistant Secretary		₹56,100 (US$580)—₹177,500 (US$1,800)

During their tenure at Junior Time Scale (JTS) and Senior Time Scale (STS) level, the officers develop requisite competencies for greater responsibilities at JAG/ NFSG level. A CPES officer may further be promoted to the level of Senior Administrative Grade (SAG) and Higher Administrative Grade (HAG) level after putting in a minimum of 17 years and 25 years of Gr. A service respectively subject to other terms and conditions. There is practically no stagnation at most of the levels in CPES Cadre and promotion takes place at regular intervals. Further, pay parity with two years junior batch IAS officers, who are on central posting, is ensured for CPES officers with Non-Functional Upgradation (NFU). CPES is among 38 Central Civil Services eligible for participation in Central Staffing Scheme (CSS) Deputation which provides opportunities to officers to serve in various Ministries of Central govt like MHA, MoD, MoCA, MoC, MEA, DPE, etc. Officers also go on deputation to various State Electricity Regulatory Commissions (SERCs), Central Electricity Regulatory Commission (CERC), Appellate Tribunal of Electricity (APTEL), etc. during the service and post retirement as Members as well.
