= Mantosh Sondhi =

Indian civil servant

Mantosh Sondhi was an IOFS officer. He served as the first General Manager of the Heavy Vehicles Factory, one of the 41 Indian Ordnance Factories. He was the founding Chairman & Managing Director of Bokaro Steel Plant. He was the first IOFS officer and first non-IAS officer to hold the posts of Secretary of Ministry of Heavy Industries, Ministry of Steel, Ministry of Mines and Ministry of Coal. He studied engineering at the University of London. He was awarded Padma Shri in 1968 by the President of India. In 1995, he was decorated as Commander of the Order of the Lion of Finland by the President of Finland. The headquarters of Confederation of Indian Industry is named in his honour. He was a member of the Atomic Energy Commission of India. He also served as the Chairman of several MNCs such as Ashok Leyland, ABB, Wärtsilä. His son is Vipin Sondhi, former CEO and MD of JCB India and Ashok Leyland.
