= Narinder Singh Kapany =

Indian physicist (1926–2020)

- ਨਰਿੰਦਰ ਸਿੰਘ ਕਪਾਨੀ
- Born: 31 October 1926; Moga, Punjab, British India (present-day Punjab, India)
- Died: 4 December 2020 (aged 94); Redwood City, California, US
- Citizenship: American
- Education: Agra University; Imperial College London
- Known for: Inventing fibre optics
- Awards: Pravasi Bharatiya Samman; The Excellence 2000 Award; Fellow of the Royal Academy of Engineering (1998); Padma Vibhushan (2021)
- Scientific career
- Fields: Physics
- Workplaces: Agra University; Ordnance Factories Board; Imperial College of Science; British Royal Academy of Engineering; Optical Society of America; American Association for the Advancement of Science; Professor at the University of California, Berkeley (UCB); University of California, Santa Cruz (UCSC); Stanford University

Narinder Singh Kapany (31 October 1926 – 4 December 2020) was an Indian-American physicist and a pioneer in the field of fiber optics. Notably, Kapany is known for coining and popularising the term "fiber optics". Fortune named him one of seven "Unsung Heroes of the 20th Century" for his Nobel Prize-deserving invention. He was awarded India's second highest civilian award, the Padma Vibhushan, posthumously in 2021. He served as an Indian Ordnance Factories Service (IOFS) officer. He was also offered the post of Scientific Adviser to the Defence Minister of India, by the first Prime Minister of India, Jawaharlal Nehru. He was also associated with the Sikh Foundation and was involved in the preservation of Sikh artwork as a collector.

== Early life and research ==
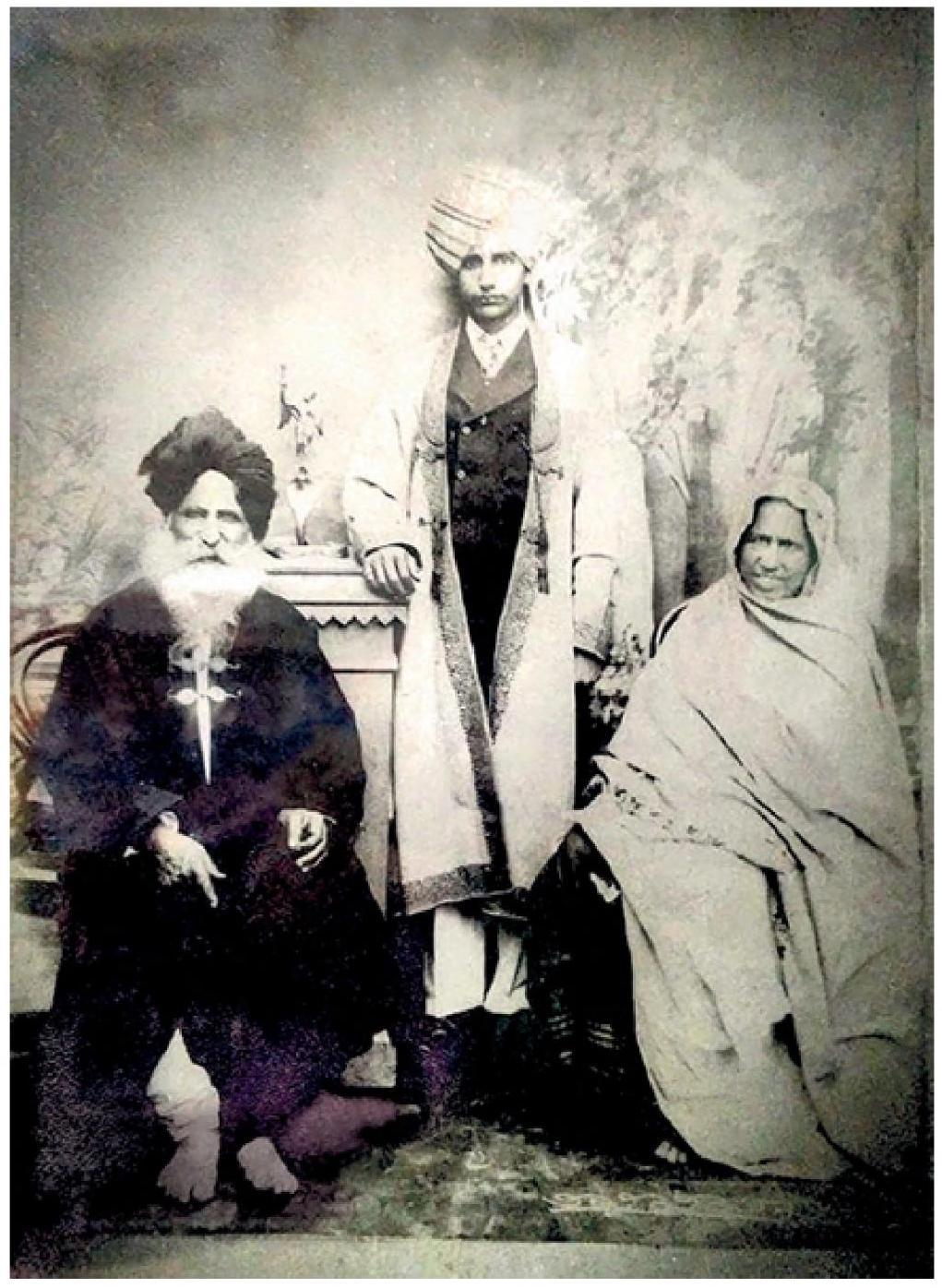
Photograph of the Kapany family, circa late 19th century. Pictured is the grandfather (centre), great-grandfather (left), and great-grandmother (right) of Narinder Singh Kapany of Moga, Punjab.

Kapany was born on 31 October 1926, in Moga, Punjab to Sundar Singh and Kundan Kaur. He was from a Sikh Khatri family of Sodhi clan and were landlords. The family claims to be descended from Guru Amar Das, the third guru of the Sikhs, through the guru's son Mohari. (Note: Mohari's name is alternatively spelt as 'Mohri'.) In c.1760, the family shifted to Nizamabad in Uttar Pradesh. He completed his schooling in Dehradun and went on to graduate from Agra University. He served as an Indian Ordnance Factories Service officer, before going to Imperial College London in 1952 to work on a Ph.D. degree in optics from the University of London, which he obtained in 1955.

At Imperial College, Kapany worked with Harold Hopkins on transmission through fibers, achieving good image transmission through a large bundle of optical fibers for the first time in 1953. Optical fibers had been tried for image transmission before, but Hopkins and Kapany's technique allowed much better image quality than could previously be achieved. This, combined with the almost-simultaneous development of optical cladding by Dutch scientist Bram van Heel, helped jump start the new field of fiber optics. Kapany coined the term 'fiber optics' in an article in Scientific American in 1960, wrote the first book about the new field, and was the new field's most prominent researcher, writer, and spokesperson.

Kapany's research and work encompassed fiber-optics communications, lasers, biomedical instrumentation, solar energy and pollution monitoring. He had over 120 patents, and was a member of the National Inventors Council. He was an International Fellow of numerous scientific societies including the Royal Academy of Engineering, the Optical Society of America, and the American Association for the Advancement of Science.

== Career ==
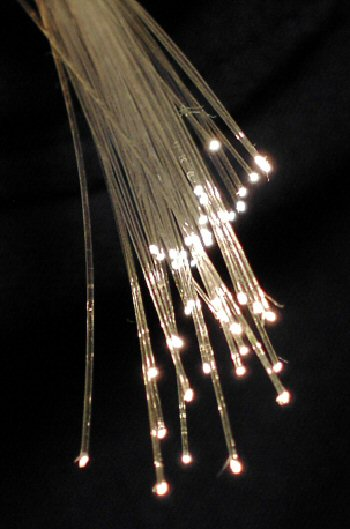
Optical fibers

As an entrepreneur and business executive, Kapany specialized in the processes of innovation and the management of technology and technology transfer. In 1960, he founded Optics Technology Inc. and was chairman of the board, president, and director of research for twelve years. In 1967 the company went public with numerous corporate acquisitions and joint-ventures in the United States and abroad. In 1973, Kapany founded Kaptron Inc. and was president and CEO until 1990 when he sold the company to AMP Incorporated. For the next nine years, Kapany was an AMP Fellow, heading the Entrepreneur & Technical Expert Program and serving as chief technologist for global communications business. He founded K2 Optronics. He also served on the boards of various companies. He was a member of the Young Presidents Organization and later a member of the World Presidents Organization.

As an academic, Kapany taught and supervised research activity of postgraduate students. He was a professor at the University of California, Berkeley and at the University of California, Santa Cruz. He founded the Center for Innovation and Entrepreneurial Development (CIED) at UCSC and served as director for seven years. At Stanford University, he was a visiting scholar in the Physics Department and consulting professor in the Department of Electrical Engineering.

As an author and lecturer, Kapany published over 100 scientific papers and four books on opto-electronics and entrepreneurship.

== Philanthropy and art ==
As a philanthropist, Kapany was active in education and the arts. He was the founding chairman of the Sikh Foundation and a major funder of its activities for over 50 years. In collaboration with international institutions and publishers, the Foundation runs programs in publishing, academia and the arts. In 1998, Kapany endowed a Chair of Sikh Studies at the University of California, Santa Barbara. His gift in 1999 of $500,000 to the Asian Art Museum of San Francisco established a gallery in its new building displaying the works he donated from his collection of Sikh art. In 1999, he endowed a Chair of Optoelectronics at the University of California, Santa Cruz. Again in 2012, he established the Narinder Kapany Endowed Chair in Entrepreneurship at UC Santa Cruz. He was a trustee of the University of California, Santa Cruz Foundation. He also served as a trustee of the Menlo School in Menlo Park, California.

As an art collector, Kapany specialised in Sikh art. He provided paintings and other objects on loan for the "Arts of the Sikh Kingdoms" exhibition, which was held at London's Victoria & Albert Museum beginning in March 1999. From there, the exhibition proceeded to the Asian Art Museum of San Francisco (with the Sikh Foundation as a sponsor) and opened in May 2000 at the Royal Ontario Museum in Toronto. The exhibition follows "Splendors of the Punjab: Sikh Art and Literature in 1992" organised by Kapany in collaboration with the Asian Art Museum and UC Berkeley to celebrate the 25th anniversary of the Sikh Foundation. As an artist, Kapany's 'dynoptic' sculptures were displayed at the Exploratorium of the Palace of Fine Arts in San Francisco in 1972 and at museums and art galleries in Chicago, Monterey, Palo Alto, and Stanford. In 1999, Kapany donated $500,000 to the Asian Art Museum in San Francisco to establish a Sikh gallery at the museum and donated a hundred Sikh artworks, artefacts, and objects from his collection for the purpose. On 27 October 2022, an enlarged Sikh gallery at the Asian Art Museum was inaugurated, with the enlarged gallery being named after Satinder Kaur, Kapany's wife.

== Awards and recognition ==
Kapany was posthumously included in the list of Padma Vibhushan awardees for 2021. The award is India's second highest civilian honor. He received the UC Santa Cruz Foundation Fiat Lux Award in 2008. He was also the recipient of the Pravasi Bharatiya Samman in 2004. He received the Excellence 2000 Award from the USA Pan-Asian American Chamber of Commerce in 1998. In November 1999, he was identified by Fortune as one of the seven "unsung heroes who greatly influenced life in the twentieth century" in the "Businessmen of the Century" issue. Dr. Kapany was also on Time Magazine's list of top ten scientists of the 20th century in Time's last issue of 1999.

== Personal life ==
Kapany married Satinder Kaur in 1954, in London. She died in 2016 after a long battle against Parkinson's disease. The couple had a daughter named Kiki Kapany, who now runs the Sikh Foundation.

== Death ==
Kapany died on 4 December 2020, aged 94 in Redwood City, California.
