= Santu Shahaney =

Santu Jouharmal Shahaney was an IOFS officer. He served as the first Indian Director General of the Indian Ordnance Factories. He was awarded Padma Shri in 1962, and Padma Bhushan in 1965, for his contributions during the Indo-China War of 1962 and the Indo-Pakistani War of 1965, respectively. He studied Mechanical Engineering at the Imperial College, London, then a constituent of the University of London. He died at the age of 48. His younger brother was Ram Shahaney, the first Chairman and Managing Director of Ashok Leyland, and Bhagwan Shahaney, a brigadier in the Indian Army and Chairman of Instrumentation Limited, Kota, he was a recipient of Padma Shri. All three brothers studied engineering in England.
