= Narangi =

Village in Maharashtra

Naringi
- village
- Location in Maharashtra, India Naringi (India)
- Coordinates: 19.4742°N 72.8107°E
- Country: India
- State: Maharashtra
- District: Palghar
- Talukas: Vasai
- Elevation: 11 m (36 ft)

Languages
  - Official: Marathi
- Time zone: UTC+5:30 (IST)

Naringi is a village in the city of Virar, in the state of Maharashtra, India.

== Geography ==
Naringi is located at 19.47°N 72.8°E. It has an average elevation of 11 metres (36 feet). The climate of the village is tropical. During Summer, the humidity level is very high and in winter the climate is almost always dry. Naringi falls in a region of high to very high rainfall often experiencing devastating rainfall in the monsoon period of June to September, every year.

== Administration ==
Narangi falls under the jurisdiction of Vasai-Virar Municipal Corporation, a recently formed civic body in the region. Narangi comes under Ward 5 of the corporation. The corporator of the region is Dr. Vasant Mangela, a candidate of the Bahujan Vikas Aaghadi, who is also a social worker and Chairman of the Jai Bhavani Reti Utpadak Cooperative Society, which is an organisation of traditional sand-lifters fighting against the use of suction pumps used in sand-mining.

== Demography ==
The people living in Narangi, are mostly the Mangela community. The etymology of the word 'Mangela' comes from the words Mang, meaning fishing nets in the Marathi language and Ela meaning people. Literally, the word means a fisherman, and the Mangela Koli are a community of Koli fishermen.

== Education ==
- Adarsh Pre-primary and Primary School

== Sports ==
Narangi has a huge cricket ground in its west end. It is named as 'Jai Bhavani Reti Bandar Cricket Ground'
