= R. M. Muzumdar =

Indian civil servant

Ramakant Maheshwar Muzumdar was an IOFS officer. He was the second Indian Director General of the Indian Ordnance Factories. He studied engineering at the University of Cambridge.

Muzumdar was awarded the Padma Bhushan in the Civil service category, by the Government of India, in 1973, for his contributions during the Indo-Pakistani War of 1971.
