= Waman Dattatreya Patwardhan =

Indian chemist (1917–2007)

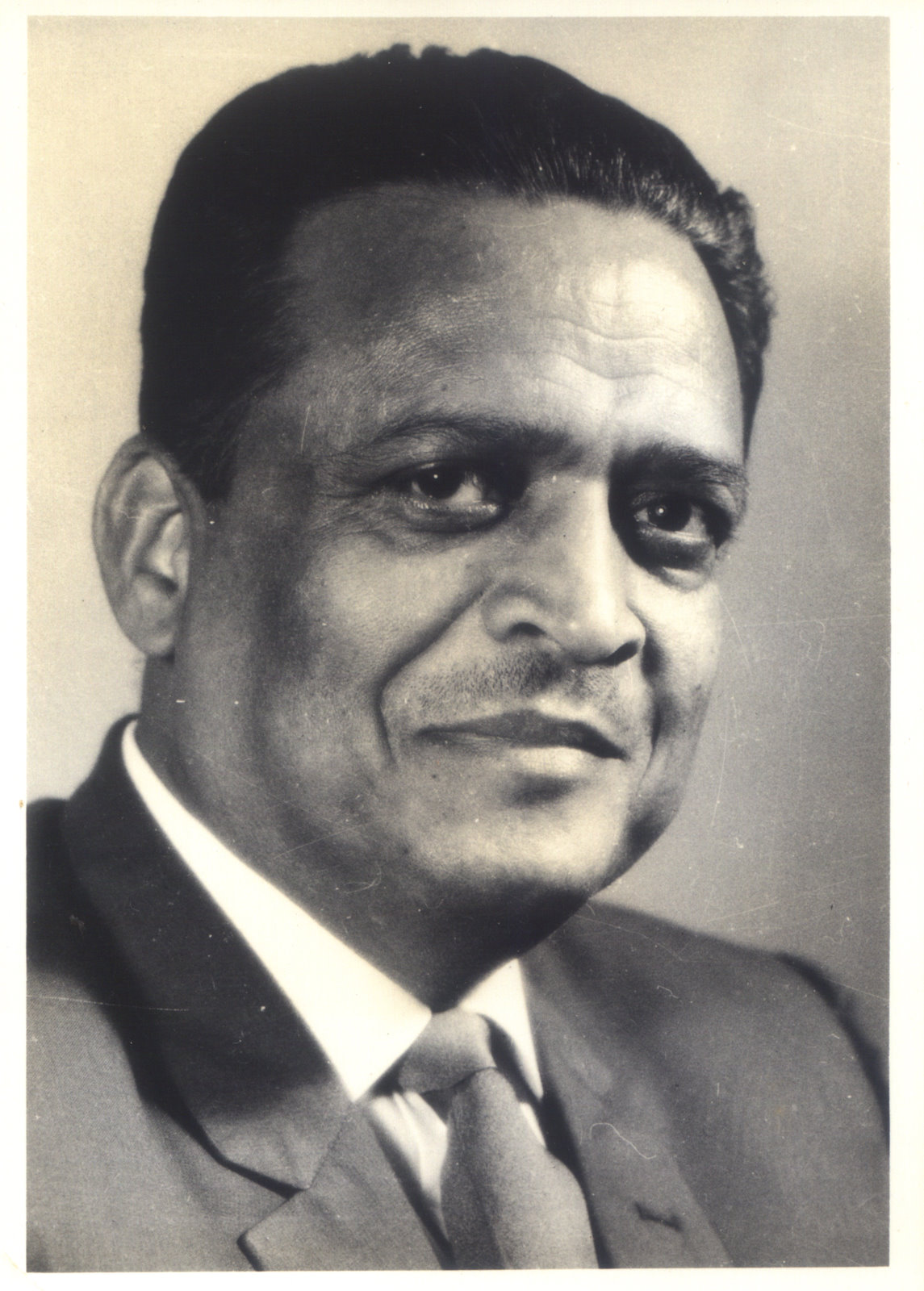
- Born: 30 January 1917; Jabalpur, Madhya Pradesh, British India, Present-day India
- Died: 27 July 2007 (aged 90); Pune, India
- Citizenship: India
- Education: Sir Parshurambhau College; University of Mumbai; H.P.T.College
- Known for: Rocket Propellants; Indian Nuclear Program; Indian Space Program; Smiling Buddha; Development of Indian missile and rocket Program research work in Military Explosives, their chemistry and applications
- Awards: Padma Shri Award (1974)
- Scientific career
- Fields: Explosives Engineering and Nuclear Chemistry
- Workplaces: Indian Ordnance Factories; Defence Research and Development Organisation; Indian Space Research Organisation; High Energy Materials Research Laboratory; Armament Research and Development Establishment
- Doctoral advisor: Dr. Ambler
- Other academic advisors: Prof. Limaye; V. C. Bhide

Notes
- An esteemed scientist personally respects by dr. A. P. J. Abdul Kalam

Waman Dattatreya Patwardhan (30 January 1917 – 27 July 2007) was an IOFS officer, nuclear chemist, defence scientist and an expert in the science of Explosives engineering. He was the founder director of the Explosives Research and Development Laboratory (now known as the High Energy Materials Research Laboratory (HEMRL)) of India. He is considered one of the distinguished scientists in India due to his contributions to Indian space program, Indian nuclear program and missile program in their early stages. He developed the solid propellant for India's first space rocket launched at Thumba. He was responsible for developing the detonation system of India's first nuclear device which was successfully tested in 1974, an operation codenamed Smiling Buddha.

Other areas of work: Wrote a book on Hydroponics and developed a cost-effective method for producing parabolic mirrors for astronomical telescopes.

He was awarded the Padma Shri in 1974 by the Government of India for his contributions.
