= Defence Institute of Advanced Technology =

Indian military engineering school

- Logo of the Defence Institute of Advanced Technology
- Former names: Institute of Armament Studies (1952–1967); Institute of Armament Technology (1967–2006)
- Motto: शास्त्रेण श‌स्त्रं प्रकरेति रक्षाम् (Sanskrit)
- Type: Deemed to be University
- Established: 1952; 74 years ago
- Accreditation: NAAC; NBA
- Academic affiliations: AICTE
- Chancellor: Minister of Defence
- Vice-Chancellor: Dr. B H V S Narayana Murthy
- Academic staff: 67
- Administrative staff: 103
- Students: 1,110(2025)
- Postgraduates: 437(2025)
- Doctoral students: 166(2025)
- Location: Pune, Maharashtra, India; 18°25′27″N 73°45′30″E
- Website: www.diat.ac.in

The Defence Institute of Advanced Technology (DIAT) is the premier engineering training institute under the Department of Defence Research & Development, Ministry of Defence, and Government of India. DIAT (DU) provides higher education to civilians and officers from Defence Research Organizations, IOFS (Indian Ordnance Factories), Defence PSUs (like Hindustan Aeronautics Limited, Bharat Electronics, Bharat Dynamics Limited), ship building agencies (like Garden Reach Shipbuilders & Engineers, Cochin and Goa Shipyards), Mazagon Dock Shipbuilders, armed forces of friendly countries (like Sri Lanka and Nigeria,), and other central and state governmental agencies.

India's Ministry of Human Resource Development has placed DIAT in the Category 'A' Deemed University. DIAT is also accredited by the National Assessment and Accreditation Council and National Board of Accreditation. Over the past years, researchers in DIAT have filed over 50 patent applications with the Indian Patent Office and published over 2000 papers in various journals of international repute.

== History ==
The Indian Armament Studies, later renamed as the Institute of Armament Technology (now Defence Institute of Advanced Technology - DIAT) was founded by Patrick Blackett (Nobel Laureate-Physics-1948) and D. S. Kothari (Padma Bushan & Padma Vibhushan) in 1952.

Patrick Blackett, a Nobel Laureate (Physics-1948) who was a military expert in the Royal British Navy was invited by Jawahar Lal Nehru, the first Prime Minister of India to 'Indianize the military' during the 1950s. Blackett was awarded the Royal Medal by the Royal Society in 1940 and the American Medal for Merit in 1946. Patrick Blackett was head of the Physics department at Imperial College London. The current building of the Physics department at Imperial College is named the Blackett Laboratory.

Daulat Singh Kothari (Padma Bushan & Padma Vibhushan), the Scientific Advisor to India's Ministry of Defence is an outstanding physicist and educationalist. He is considered to be the architect of defence science in India. He is the founder of most of the DRDO labs in India such as the Naval Dockyard Laboratory (later renamed Naval Chemical and Metallurgical Laboratory) in Mumbai, the Indian Naval Physical Laboratory in Kochi, the Centre for Fire Research in Delhi, the Solid State Physics Laboratory in Delhi, the Defence Food Research Laboratory in Mysore, the Defence Institute of Physiology and Allied Sciences in Chennai, the Directorate of Psychological Research in New Delhi, the Defence Electronics Research Laboratory in Hyderabad, the Scientific Evaluation Group in Delhi, and the Terminal Ballistic Research Laboratory in Chandigarh. Dr. D.S. Kothari has also played a crucial role in setting up UGC and NCERT.

A. P. J. Abdul Kalam in his book, Ignited Minds: Unleashing the Power Within India wrote, “Dr. D.S. Kothari, a professor at Delhi University, was an outstanding physicist and astrophysicist. He is well known for ionisation of matter by pressure in cold compact object like planets. This theory is complementary to the epoch-making theory of thermal ionisation of his guru, Dr Maghnad Saha. Dr. D.S. Kothari set a scientific tradition in Indian defence tasks when he became Scientific Advisor to Defence Minister in 1948. The first thing he did was to establish the Defence Science Centre to do research in electronic materials, nuclear medicine and ballistic science."

Dr. D.S. Kothari and Dr. P Blackett worked together at the Cavendish Laboratory in Cambridge University under the guidance of Ernest Rutherford, the father of nuclear physics.

In 1967, the Indian Armament Studies was renamed as the "Institute of Armament Technology" (IAT) and was moved to its present location in Girinagar, Pune. From the relatively narrow scope of Armament Studies in the 1950s, the role of the institute was considerably enlarged by the Defence R&D Council in 1964, and then again in 1981.

On the basis of accreditation by the All India Council of Technical Education (AICTE), Pune University recognised eight courses for the award of the ME degree in 1980. In the year 2000, the institute acquired the status of a Deemed University. IAT has been renamed as DIAT W.E.F. on 1 April 2006.

DIAT ranked 35th (under the university category) in the nation's first National Institutional Ranking Framework introduced by the Ministry of Education in 2016.

DIAT is supported by 52 laboratories belonging to the Defence Research & Development Organization, Defence PSUs, and Indian Armed Forces to conduct collaborative research, as well as to validate and assess the various innovative technologies developed by its students and researchers.

== Founders & Guides of DIAT ==
- Padma Vibhushan Dr D S Kothari: Scientific Advisor to Raksha Mantri (SA to RM) (1948–1961)
- Col. H. M. Paterson RMCS, Shivenham UK: The man behind 'Paterson Report' formed the Genesis of IAT
- Brig. L S Anand: 1st Director of Military Studies, IAS Kirkee Year 1952
- Prof. S Bhagavantam SA to RM, DG R&D (1961–1970)
- Dr. BD Nagchaudhuri SA to RM, DG R&D Secretary Def. R&D (1970–1974)
- Padma Bhushan Prof. MGK Menon FRS, SA to RM, DG R&D Secretary Def. R&D (1974–1978)
- Padma Vibhushan Dr. Raja Ramanna, SA to RM, DG R&D Secretary Def. R&D (1978–1982)
- Padma Vibhushan Dr. V S Arunachalam, SA to RM, DG R&D Secretary Def. R&D (1982–1992)
- Bharat Ratna Dr. APJ Abdul Kalam, SA to RM, DG R&D Secretary Def. R&D (1992–1999)
- Padma Bhushan Dr. V K Aatre, SA to RM, DG R&D Secretary Def. R&D (1999–2004).

== Courses ==
DIAT has been imparting technical education in niche areas at PG (MTech) and PhD levels for over 60 years through various forms and capacities. Its facilities are spread over 496 acres, with its main focus being on the development of indigenous contemporary defence-related technologies.

To meet the training requirements of the Armed Forces, DIAT (DU) was bifurcated to form the Military Institute of Technology (MILIT) in Pune. This is an inter-service institution of the Integrated Defence Staff, an organisation responsible for fostering the coordination and enablement of prioritisation across the different branches of the Indian Armed Forces. MILIT trains officers from the three branches of the Indian Armed Forces, which are the Army, Navy, and Air Force, as well as, provides training for officers from friendly foreign countries for command and staff appointments. MILIT also conducts short term certificate courses (TTC, TSOC) for officers from the three branches.

Recently DIAT started an intensive certification program in the area of Cybersecurity, Artificial Intelligence, and Machine Learning which lasts approximately 3 months. Participant entrance to this course is based on the DIAT Entrance Exam.

== Rankings ==
College rankings

Engineering – India
- NIRF (2024): 63

The Defence Institute of Advanced Technology was ranked 63rd in the engineering category by the National Institutional Ranking Framework (NIRF) in 2024.

== Collaborative research programs ==
DIAT has signed collaborative research programs as well as faculty and student exchange programs with reputed universities and organizations worldwide like Cranfield University in the UK, the Naval Postgraduate School in the US, Technion Israel, Belarus State University in Belarus, Deakin University in Australia, the University of Warwick in the UK, the Military Technical Academy in Vietnam, Nanyang Technological University in Singapore, the National University of Singapore, Dassault Aviation (Rafale) India Ltd, Boeing India Ltd. and more. It also has partnerships with numerous national universities and organizations like BARC, DST, IITs, NITS, NIITS, IIIT, ATIRA, CIPET, state universities, and so on.

== Fight against coronavirus ==
To support the country's effort in containing the spread of the novel Corona pandemic, DIAT (DU) developed a cost-effective solution to disintegrate coronavirus, named ‘Atulya'. 'Atulya' is a microwave sterilizer which can be operated in portable or fixed installations and helps in disintegrating the virus by differential heating in the range of 56 to 60 degrees Celsius. 'Atulya' weighs around three kilograms and can be used for the sterilization of non-metallic objects. Depending on the size and shape of objects, sterilization times vary from 30 seconds to one minute. Professor K.P. Ray is the co-innovator with Maser Electronics Private Limited.

On top of this, the Defence Institute of Advanced Technology also developed nanofibres of Ayurvedic based biodegradable face masks which acts as a pathogen neutraliser in resisting bacteria/virus, named “Pavitrapati”. The non-woven nano-fibre of this three-layered biodegradable mask contains a herbal extract invented by Prof Balasubramanian K. Professor & Dean, DIAT (DU), and is obtained from neem oil, turmeric, tulsi (holy basil), ajwain (carom seeds), black pepper, gum arabic, clove, sandalwood, and saffron. Following this, a Transfer of Technology [ToT] / NDA of this product was signed in June 2020 between DIAT and the Kolhapur-based textile company M/s. Siddheshwar Techtessile Pvt. Ltd. in Maharashtra for its actual mass level production. Through this, the company launched its first ever Ayurvedic based biodegradable face mask named “Pavitrapati” with around 10,000 masks being initially developed.

DIAT then transfers another ToT to M/s. Siddheshwar Techtessile Pvt. Ltd. in Maharashtra for the development of anti-microbial bodysuits in the name of “Aushada Tara”. With superior hydrophobic, breathing, anti-microbial, and comfort feeling properties, the fabric material of these bodysuits were approved for COVID-19 usage. It has also cleared splash resistant tests and has good repellent fluid properties, thereby allowing it to cater to the needs of medical hospitals, private companies, airlines and governmental agencies.

== Boarding ==
Accommodation and mess facilities are available at the POINTS Hostel on a payment basis. More than 200 rooms are available for the accommodation of students in the DIAT (DU). The POINTS hostel building has a common lift in all buildings with covered parking for vehicles. Each room is equipped with a bathroom, telephone, geysers, WI-FI, and many more. Rooms are currently provided on a twin sharing basis and can accommodate up to four students.

On top of these facilities, there is also:

- A hostel (6 floors/100 rooms) exclusively for female students which can accommodate over 400 students
- A hostel exclusively for male students
- A hostel with 14 studio apartments for married students

Other than hostels, DIAT (DU) provides:

- Quarters (Type 1 to 6) for its employees and eligible married students
- Guest houses for visitors on campus
