= KIOCL Limited =

Indian iron company

- Type: Central Public Sector Undertaking
- Traded as: BSE: 540680; NSE: KIOCL
- Industry: Iron making; Mining
- Founded: 1976
- Headquarters: Bangalore, India
- Key people: Shri T Saminathan Chairman and MD
- Products: Iron oxide pellets; Pig iron
- Revenue: INR 497.3 million (2016-17)
- Owner: Ministry of Steel, Government of India
- Website: www.kioclltd.in

KIOCL Limited, formerly Kudremukh Iron Ore Company Limited, is a central public sector undertaking under the ownership of the Ministry of Steel, Government of India, with its head office and administrative activities in Bangalore. It has a pelletisation plant in Mangalore and an iron ore mine in Kudremukh (Chikkamagaluru district). The Kudremukh mine, one of the largest iron ore mines in the world, was closed in 2006.

The captive mining took place at Kudremukh on the Western Ghats range. The mined ore was transported 110 km through slurry pipelines running through the districts of Udupi and Dakshina Kannada up to the pelletisation plant in Panambur, adjacent to the premises of the New Mangalore Port.

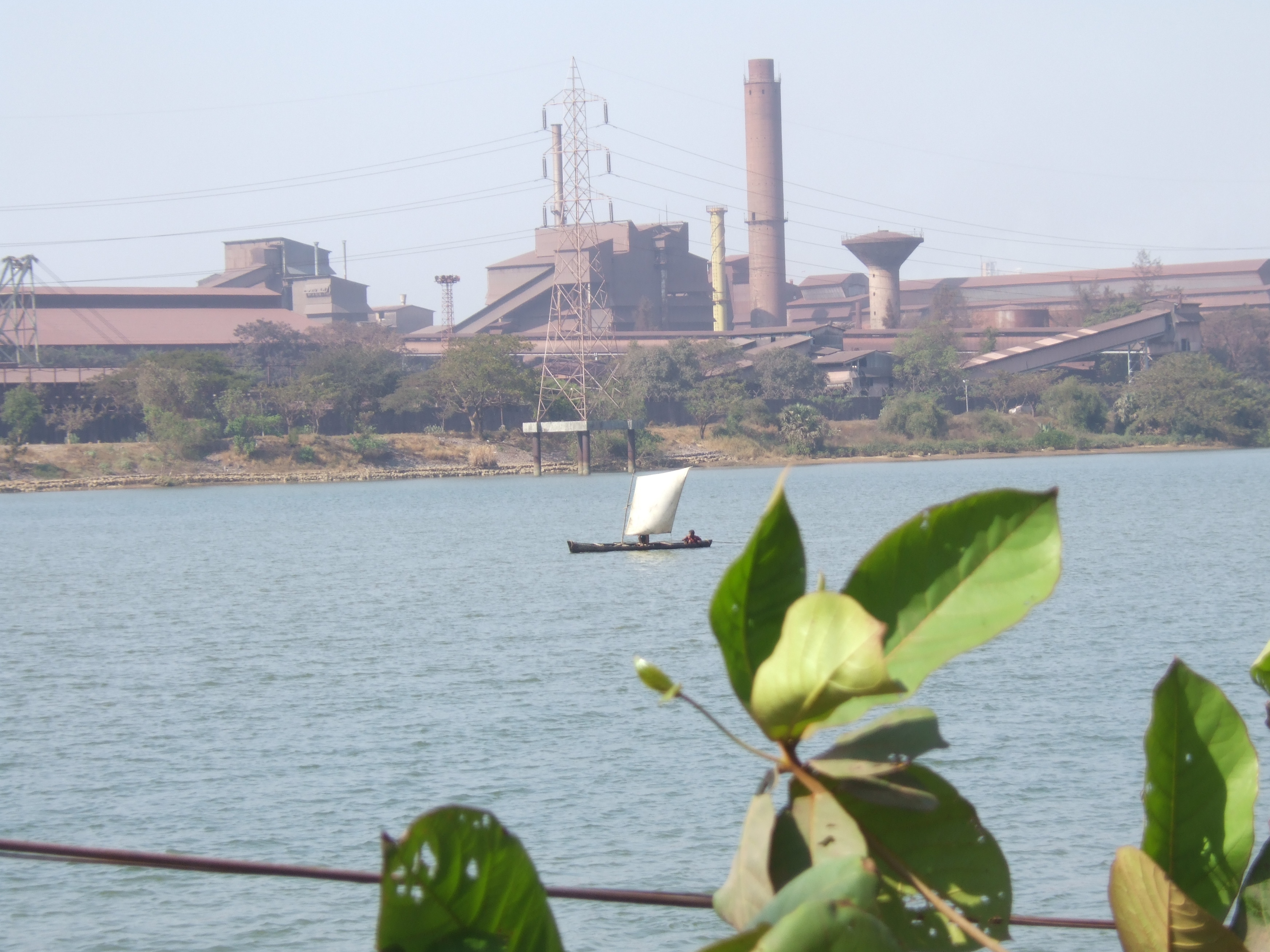
The Kudremukh Iron Ore Company Ltd. plant in New Mangalore Port

The pellet plant, with a capacity of 3.5 million tons per annum, was commissioned at Mangalore in 1987. The plant was stopped in 2011 but in 2014, it resumed producing and exporting pellets, running on ores supplied by NMDC Limited. The pellets have been shipped to countries like China, Iran, Japan, and Taiwan.

In 2017, there were plans to restart captive mining operations, now at Sanduru in the Bellary district.

== Controversies ==
In 2016, KIOCL planned to develop a commercial resort in the Kudremukh National Park, refurbishing some of its unused buildings since the closure of the mine. The project had not obtained an environmental clearance. In October 2016 the Ministry of Environment and Forests ordered to stop the work immediately.

== General references ==
- Company overview KIOCL Limited.
- Brief overview of KIOCL limited Ministry of Steel, Government of India.
