= H. G. S. Murthy =

Indian space scientist

Holenarasipura Govindrao Srinivasa Murthy was an IOFS officer and a space scientist. He was known as one of the "Seven Pioneers of the Indian Space Programme". He served at the Machine Tool Prototype Factory (MTPF), Ambernath, and as the first Director of the Thumba Equatorial Rocket Launching Station (TERLS), and the Space Science & Technology Centre, now known as the Vikram Sarabhai Space Centre, of the Indian Space Research Organisation (ISRO). He was awarded Padma Shri in 1969 by the Government of India. He was PhD in Aerospace engineering from the University of Minnesota. He was also the Vice-President of the International Aeronautical Federation from 1970 to 1972. He interviewed and recruited A. P. J. Abdul Kalam into ISRO.
