= High Energy Materials Research Laboratory =

Indian lab in Pune, Maharashtra

- Established: 1960
- Field of research: High Energy Materials and Explosive materials
- Director: Dr A P Dash
- Staff: 200 Scientists
- Address: Sutarwadi, Pune- 411021
- Location: Pune, Maharashtra; 18.530306°N 73.7736678°E
- Operating agency: DRDO
- Website: HEMRL Home Page

High Energy Materials Research Laboratory (HEMRL) is one of the premier laboratories of the Defence Research and Development Organisation (DRDO) located in Pune Maharashtra. Main area of works of the lab include research and development of high energy materials and related technologies. HEMRL is organised under the Armaments Directorate of DRDO. The current director of the lab is Dr A P Dash.

HEMRL has a core strength of 600 personnel, comprising chemists, physicists, mathematicians, chemical, mechanical and electronic engineers. It is recognised as a postgraduate centre for basic and applied research and is an ISO-9001:2015 certified laboratory.

== History ==
The precursor to HEMRL was the Chemical Examiner's Office which was established in 1908 at Nainital. In 1960, it was renamed as Explosives Research & Development Laboratory (ERDL) and was located in Pashan, Pune. In 1963, it was placed under DRDO control as a full-fledged R&D laboratory. ERDL was renamed as HEMRL in March 1995 in order to emphasise its work in all aspects of high energy materials research.

== Areas of work ==
HEMRL is the main DRDO laboratory and one of the few labs in India that is involved in basic and applied research in all areas of high energy materials. Under this mandate, it conducts R&D in formulation, design and development of propellants, high explosives, pyrotechnics, polymeric materials, liners/insulators, and other materials. These include studies on the physiochemical and combustion characteristics of materials, the study of detonation phenomena and the development of new systems. HEMRL also carries out the synthesis of new explosive materials and compounds of importance in the field of HEMs.

Design and development of pilot plants for synthesis of high energy materials and related non-explosive chemicals is also carried out. After the development of technologies and products, HEMRL is involved in the successful production and transfer of technology of these products to appropriate agencies.

=== Facilities ===
In addition to a number of laboratory analytical instruments, HEMRL has state-of-the-art research and production facilities for the study of explosive, propellant and pyrotechnic phenomena. These include facilities for Measurement of flame intensity and temperature, study of detonation phenomenon, determination of mechanical properties of propellants & polymers and facilities for static Rocket testing and Non destructive testing of materials. HEMRL also has labs and pilot production plants for synthesising high energy materials and their allied chemicals.

== Projects and Products ==
HEMRL handles different projects for the Indian Ordnance Factories, Indian Armed Forces and other organisations like BARC and the Indian Space Research Organisation.

- In 2024, HEMRL successfully designed and implemented an indigenous, cost-efficient manufacturing process for large-scale production of amorphous boron powder (BP) using metallothermic reduction of boric anhydride.

=== Technologies for civilian use ===
In common with other DRDO labs, HEMRL also develops spin-off products for civilian use.

==== Air Regenerating Composition ====
This composition is used for maintaining breathable air within a closed space. It regenerates air inside confined space by liberating oxygen and simultaneously absorbing carbon dioxide. It can be used in civil applications like rescue work in mines, fire/ toxic environments, toxic gas/chemical plant operation, mountaineering expeditions, complete air regeneration inside a spacecraft, under sea exploration and mining etc.

==== Chemical Kit for Detection of Explosives (CKDE) ====
A compact, low-cost and handy explosive detection kit has been designed and perfected for field detection of traces of explosives. The kit yields a colour reaction, based on which explosives can be detected in minutes. It is used for identification of all common military, civil and home-made explosive compositions, and is being used by Police and BSF for the detection of explosives.

=== Indian CL-20 ===
A new high explosive is in the making at a DRDO lab here that could replace other standard explosives of the armed forces such as RDX, HMX, FOX-7 and Amorphous Boron. Scientists at the Pune-based High Energy Materials Research Laboratory (HEMRL) have already synthesised adequate quantity of CL-20, the new explosive, in their laboratory.

The powerful explosive can substantially reduce the weight and size of the warhead while packing much more punch. The compound, 'Indian CL-20' or 'ICL-20', was indigenously developed in HEMRL using inverse technology. CL-20, so named after the China Lake facility of the Naval Air Weapons Station in California, US, was first synthesised by Dr Arnold Nielson in 1987.

CL-20 or Hexanitrohexaazaisowurtzitane is a Nitramine class of explosive which is more powerful than HMX which in turn is more powerful than RDX

CL-20-based shaped charges significantly improve the penetration over armors and could potentially be used in the bomb for the 120-mm main gun mounted on the MBT Arjun tanks. The CL-20 in its reduced sensitivity enables easy handling and transportation and reduces the chances of mishap and loss to men, money, materials and machines.

== Accidents ==
- On 25 April 2002, an explosion at a solid propellant processing unit and its resulting fire killed six HEMRL personnel, including two scientists. A court of inquiry was ordered. The explosion was due to sudden reaction between sensitive chemicals.
- On 30 September 2009 an explosion took place at this laboratory leading to suspension of explosives processing for a week.
