= List of Padma Shri award recipients (1960–1969) =

Recipients of a civilian award in India

Padma Shri
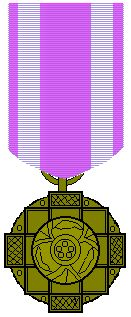
- Type: National Civilian
- Country: India
- Presented by: Government of India
- Ribbon
- Obverse: A centrally located lotus flower is embossed and the text "Padma" written in Devanagari script is placed above and the text "Shri" is placed below the lotus.
- Reverse: A platinum State Emblem of India placed in the centre with the national motto of India, "Satyameva Jayate" (Truth alone triumphs) in Devanagari Script
- Established: 1954
- First award: 1954

Highlights
- Total: 309

Precedence
- Next (higher): Padma Bhushan

Padma Shri Award, India's fourth highest civilian honours - Winners, 1960-1969:

== Recipients ==
Award recipients by year
Year	Number of recipients
1960	20
1961	26
1962	25
1963	21
1964	13
1965	34
1966	30
1967	41
1968	44
1969	55

Award recipients by field
Field	Number of recipients
Arts	50
Civil Service	45
Literature & Education	55
Medicine	26
Public Affairs	3
Science & Engineering	37
Social Work	51
Sports	29
Trade & Industry	13

List of Padma Shri award recipients
Year	Recipient	Field	State
1960	Rustomji Marwanji Alpaiwala	Public Affairs	Maharashtra
1960	Nanabhai Bhatt	Social Work	Gujarat
1960	Anil Kumar Das	Science & Engineering	West Bengal
1960	Bina Das	Social Work	West Bengal
1960	Kalpathy Ram Iyer Doraiswamy	Medicine	Tamil Nadu
1960	Vijay Hazare	Sports	Gujarat
1960	Bellary Shamanna Kesavan	Literature & Education	Karnataka
1960	Adinath Lahiri	Trade & Industry	West Bengal
1960	Artaballabha Mohanty	Literature & Education	Odisha
1960	Dahyabhai Jivaji Naik	Social Work	Gujarat
1960	Jasu Patel	Sports	Gujarat
1960	Nuthakki Bhanu Prasad	Civil Service	Andhra Pradesh
1960	Ayyagiri Rao	Science & Engineering	Andhra Pradesh
1960	Arati Saha	Sports	West Bengal
1960	Kulsum Sayani	Social Work	Maharashtra
1960	Har Krishna Lal Sethi	Civil Service	Delhi
1960	Har Mander Singh	Civil Service	Punjab
1960	Vaidyanatha Subrahmanyan	Civil Service	Karnataka
1960	Vir Vati	Arts	Delhi
1960	Sophia Wadia	Social Work	Maharashtra
1961	Kartar Singh Dewana	Science & Engineering	Punjab
1961	Vinayaka Krishna Gokak	Literature & Education	Karnataka
1961	Kattingeri Krishna Hebbar	Arts	Maharashtra
1961	Kamalabai Hospet	Social Work	Maharashtra
1961	Marthhand Ramchandra Jamdar	Social Work	Gujarat
1961	Vishnukant Jha	Literature & Education	Bihar
1961	Jinvijay	Literature & Education	Rajasthan
1961	Baibi Harparkash Kaur	Social Work	Punjab
1961	Bismillah Khan	Arts	Uttar Pradesh
1961	Agram Krishnamachar	Civil Service	Karnataka
1961	Evengeline Lazarus	Literature & Education	Karnataka
1961	Hilda Mary Lazarus	Medicine	Andhra Pradesh
1961	Bhagwat Sinha Mehta	Civil Service	Rajasthan
1961	M. G. K. Menon	Science & Engineering	Delhi
1961	Parshuram Mishra	Literature & Education	Odisha
1961	Premendra Mitra	Literature & Education	West Bengal
1961	Sonam Narboo	Civil Service	Jammu & Kashmir
1961	Veerangowda Patil	Social Work	Karnataka
1961	Vithalrao Vikhe Patil	Trade & Industry	Maharashtra
1961	Mithuben Petit	Social Work	Gujarat
1961	Raghunath Krishna Phadke	Arts	Madhya Pradesh
1961	Brahm Prakash	Science & Engineering	Punjab
1961	Amal Shah	Social Work	Bihar
1961	Gyan Singh	Sports	Uttar Pradesh
1961	N. D. Sundaravadivelu	Literature & Education	Tamil Nadu
1961	Man Mohan Suri	Science & Engineering	Punjab
1962	Vellore Ponnurangam Appadurai	Civil Service	Tamil Nadu
1962	N. Ramaswami Ayyar	Social Work	Tamil Nadu
1962	Tarasankar Bandyopadhyay	Literature & Education	West Bengal
1962	Nari Contractor	Sports	Maharashtra
1962	Amalananda Ghosh	Civil Service	West Bengal
1962	Sonam Gyatso	Sports	Sikkim
1962	Dula Bhaya Kag	Literature & Education	Gujarat
1962	Ramanathan Krishnan	Sports	Tamil Nadu
1962	Ashok Kumar	Arts	Maharashtra
1962	Krishnarao Shripat Mhaskar	Medicine	Maharashtra
1962	Bishnupada Mukerjee	Civil Service	West Bengal
1962	Santosh Kumar Mukherjee	Medicine	West Bengal
1962	Challagalla Narasimham	Civil Service	Andhra Pradesh
1962	Gostha Pal	Sports	West Bengal
1962	Joseph Durai Raj	Civil Service	Delhi
1962	Shanti Kumar Tribhuvandas Raja	Civil Service	Odisha
1962	Sachidananda Routray	Literature & Education	Odisha
1962	Santu Shahaney	Civil Service	West Bengal
1962	Shridhar Sharma	Medicine	Rajasthan
1962	Sarda Nand Singh	Civil Service	Punjab
1962	Natthi Singh	Science & Engineering	Uttar Pradesh
1962	Mother Teresa	Social Work	West Bengal
1962	Polly Umrigar	Sports	Maharashtra
1962	V. Ramchandra Vajramushti	Civil Service	Andhra Pradesh
1962	Channapatna Krishnappa Venkataramayya	Literature & Education	Karnataka
1963	Mushtaq Ali	Sports	Madhya Pradesh
1963	P. K. Banerjee	Civil Service	West Bengal
1963	George William Gregory Bird	Medicine	– (Note: Indicates a citizen of the United Kingdom)
1963	Nani Chandra Bordoloi	Medicine	Assam
1963	Brij Krishna Chandiwala	Social Work	Delhi
1963	Ahindra Choudhury	Literature & Education	West Bengal
1963	Sumant Kishore Jain	Civil Service	Uttar Pradesh
1963	K. C. Johorey	Civil Service	Haryana
1963	N. G. Krishna Murti	Civil Service	Tamil Nadu
1963	Mehboob Khan	Arts	Maharashtra
1963	Sisir Kumar Lahiri	Civil Service	–
1963	Rev Joel Lakra	Social Work	Bihar
1963	Pilloo Maneck Maneckiji	Social Work	Maharashtra
1963	Melville de Mellow	Arts	Rajasthan
1963	Leela Sumant Moolgaokar	Social Work	Maharashtra
1963	Sohrab Pestonji Shroff	Medicine	Delhi
1963	Rasheed Ahmad Siddiqui	Literature & Education	Delhi
1963	Bishan Man Singh	Science & Engineering	Uttar Pradesh
1963	Rana Krishnadev Narain Singh	Civil Service	Assam
1963	Nashir Framroz Suntook	Civil Service	Maharashtra
1963	Sultan Singh Yadav	Civil Service	Delhi
1964	Paramananda Acharya	Science & Engineering	Odisha
1964	Srinivasa Ambujammal	Social Work	Tamil Nadu
1964	M. J. Gopalan	Sports	Tamil Nadu
1964	Nawang Gombu	Sports	West Bengal
1964	Thapfoorya Haralu	Civil Service	Nagaland
1964	Vinayak Pandurang Karmarkar	Arts	Maharashtra
1964	Adi Pherozeshah Marzban	Arts	Maharashtra
1964	Santosh Kumar Mazumdar	Medicine	Delhi
1964	Gadde Ramakoteswar Rao	Science & Engineering	Andhra Pradesh
1964	Krishna Chandra Shukla	Literature & Education	Rajasthan
1964	Charanjit Singh	Sports	Haryana
1964	P. C. Sorcar	Arts	West Bengal
1964	Ramesh Chandra Bhaskar Sule	Civil Service	Maharashtra
1965	Krutartha Acharya	Trade & Industry	Odisha
1965	Vishnu Namdeo Adarkar	Literature & Education	Maharashtra
1965	H. P. S. Ahluwalia	Sports	Punjab
1965	Panavelil Thomas Chandi	Literature & Education	Uttar Pradesh
1965	Avtar Singh Cheema	Sports	Punjab
1965	Kandathil Mammen Cherian	Literature & Education	Kerala
1965	D. B. Deodhar	Sports	Maharashtra
1965	Phu Dorjee Sherpa	Sports	West Bengal
1965	Vishnu Madav Ghatage	Science & Engineering	Karnataka
1965	Jack Gibson	Literature & Education	Rajasthan
1965	Mona Chandravati Gupta	Social Work	Uttar Pradesh
1965	Hakim Abdul Hameed	Medicine	Delhi
1965	Wilson Jones	Sports	Maharashtra
1965	Ang Kami Sherpa	Sports	Assam
1965	Anant Kanekar	Literature & Education	Maharashtra
1965	Hanumanbax Kanoi	Trade & Industry	Assam
1965	Narendra Kumar	Sports	Punjab
1965	Verghese Kurien	Trade & Industry	Gujarat
1965	Guru Kunchu Kurup	Arts	Kerala
1965	Lakshmi Mazumdar	Social Work	Delhi
1965	Dwijendra Nath Mukerjee	Medicine	West Bengal
1965	Chittor V. Nagayya	Arts	Tamil Nadu
1965	Gordhandas Bhagwandas Narottamdas	Social Work	Maharashtra
1965	T. M. A. Pai	Literature & Education	Karnataka
1965	Jashbhai Shankarbhai Patel	Science & Engineering	Gujarat
1965	Ravishankar Raval	Arts	Gujarat
1965	Harish Chandra Singh Rawat	Sports	Delhi
1965	John Richardson	Social Work	Andaman and Nicobar Islands
1965	Mrinalini Sarabhai	Arts	Gujarat
1965	Thrity H. Taleyarkhan	Social Work	Maharashtra
1965	Mritanjaya Vaidyanathan	Science & Engineering	Tamil Nadu
1965	Chandra Prakash Vohra	Sports	West Bengal
1965	Gopal Prasad Vyas	Literature & Education	Delhi
1965	Sonam Wangyal	Sports	Sikkim
1966	Ebrahim Alkazi	Trade & Industry	Delhi
1966	Surinder Singh Bedi	Civil Service	Delhi
1966	Kundal Lal Bery	Civil Service	Punjab
1966	Ernest Joachim Joseph Borges	Medicine	Maharashtra
1966	Nirmal Kumar Bose	Literature & Education	West Bengal
1966	Stanislaus Joseph Coelho	Civil Service	Maharashtra
1966	Swami Bichitranada Das	Social Work	Odisha
1966	Robert Brocklesby Davis	Medicine	Bihar
1966	Purushottam Laxman Deshpande	Literature & Education	Maharashtra
1966	Dharmendra	Medicine	Delhi
1966	Satish Dhawan	Science & Engineering	Karnataka
1966	Sivaji Ganesan	Arts	Tamil Nadu
1966	M. F. Husain	Arts	Delhi
1966	Eswara Iyer Krishna Iyer	Arts	Tamil Nadu
1966	Mohammed Din Jagir	Social Work	Jammu & Kashmir
1966	Jerusha Jhirad	Medicine	Maharashtra
1966	Ramprasad Ramchand Khandelwal	Trade & Industry	Uttar Pradesh
1966	Kishan Lal	Sports	Uttar Pradesh
1966	Sanganbasappa Mallangouda Patil	Civil Service	Karnataka
1966	Arun Ramavtar Poddar	Literature & Education	Maharashtra
1966	Jagdish Prasad	Civil Service	Uttar Pradesh
1966	Sayyid Ahmedullah Qadri	Literature & Education	Andhra Pradesh
1966	Sumitra Charat Ram	Arts	Delhi
1966	Bhanumathi Ramakrishna	Arts	Tamil Nadu
1966	B. Sivamurthy Sastry	Literature & Education	Karnataka
1966	Hari Shankar Sharma	Literature & Education	Uttar Pradesh
1966	Sardar Mohan Singh	Civil Service	Delhi
1966	Rajkavi Inderjeet Singh Tulsi	Literature & Education	Delhi
1966	Kuldip Singh Virk	Civil Service	Punjab
1966	Rajeshwar Nath Zutshi	Literature & Education	Madhya Pradesh
1967	Anekal Ramaswamy Iyengar Gopal Aiyengar	Science & Engineering	Maharashtra
1967	K. C. Banerjee	Civil Service	West Bengal
1967	Daji Bhatawadekar	Arts	Maharashtra
1967	Balakrishna Bhagwant Borkar	Literature & Education	Goa
1967	A. Nagappa Chettiar	Trade & Industry	Tamil Nadu
1967	Vasant Desai	Arts	Maharashtra
1967	Chandi Dan Detha	Science & Engineering	Rajasthan
1967	Siddheshwari Devi	Arts	Delhi
1967	Frank Sathyarajan Dewars	Civil Service	Myanmar
1967	Syed Fareeduddin	Science & Engineering	Andhra Pradesh
1967	Ali Sardar Jafri	Literature & Education	Maharashtra
1967	Puthenpurayil Mathew Joseph	Literature & Education	Kerala
1967	Prabhjot Kaur	Literature & Education	Delhi
1967	Shankar Lakshman	Sports	Karnataka
1967	Mayadhar Mansingh	Literature & Education	Odisha
1967	Chandravadan Mehta	Literature & Education	Gujarat
1967	Ved Rattan Mohan	Trade & Industry	Uttar Pradesh
1967	Sashadhar Mukherjee	Arts	Maharashtra
1967	Kashi Prasad Pandey	Public Affairs	Madhya Pradesh
1967	Mansoor Ali Khan Pataudi	Sports	Delhi
1967	Maganbhai Ramchhodbhai Patel	Science & Engineering	Gujarat
1967	Harishchandra Gopal Patil	Science & Engineering	Maharashtra
1967	Edith Helen Paull	Medicine	Maharashtra
1967	Shanti Prasad	Civil Service	Uttar Pradesh
1967	Syed Abdul Qadir	Social Work	Uttar Pradesh
1967	Mohammed Rafi	Arts	Punjab
1967	Kallur Subba Rao	Social Work	Andhra Pradesh
1967	Vinjamuri Venkata Lakshmi Narasimha Rao	Arts	Tamil Nadu
1967	Amar Prasad Ray	Medicine	Delhi
1967	Balbir Singh Saigal	Civil Service	Delhi
1967	Hermenegild Santapau	Science & Engineering	– (Note: Indicates a citizen of Spain)
1967	Priya Ranjan Sen	Social Work	West Bengal
1967	Vithaldas Hakamchand Shah	Trade & Industry	Maharashtra
1967	Ajit Singh	Science & Engineering	Punjab
1967	Gurdial Singh	Sports	Chandigarh
1967	Lal Singh	Science & Engineering	Uttarakhand
1967	Prithipal Singh	Sports	Punjab
1967	M. S. Swaminathan	Science & Engineering	Tamil Nadu
1967	Natteri Veeraraghavan	Medicine	Tamil Nadu
1967	Guduru Venkatachalam	Science & Engineering	Tamil Nadu
1967	Lal Chand Verman	Public Affairs	Delhi
1968	M. R. Acharekar	Arts	Maharashtra
1968	Begum Akhtar	Arts	Uttar Pradesh
1968	Sharan Rani Backliwal	Arts	Delhi
1968	S. Ramaswamy Iyer Balasubrahmanyam	Science & Engineering	Kerala
1968	Nikhil Banerjee	Arts	West Bengal
1968	D. R. Bendre	Literature & Education	Karnataka
1968	Jehangir Shapurji Bhownagary	Civil Service	– (Note: Indicates a citizen of France)
1968	Manibhai Desai	Social Work	Maharashtra
1968	Lakshman Dev	Science & Engineering	Uttar Pradesh
1968	Narendra Singh Dev	Social Work	Madhya Pradesh
1968	Rajkumari Sumitra Devi	Social Work	Haryana
1968	Sunil Dutt	Arts	Maharashtra
1968	Bhaurao Krishnaji Gaikwad	Social Work	Maharashtra
1968	Kedar Ghosh	Literature & Education	West Bengal
1968	Amar Nath Gupta	Social Work	Delhi
1968	Joseph Harold	Arts	Delhi
1968	Shamrao Sakaramrao Kadam	Literature & Education	Maharashtra
1968	Govind Pandurang Kane	Science & Engineering	Maharashtra
1968	Durga Khote	Arts	Maharashtra
1968	Yamini Krishnamurthy	Arts	Delhi
1968	Shalini Moghe	Social Work	Madhya Pradesh
1968	Narinder Nath Mohan	Social Work	Haryana
1968	Akhtar Mohiuddin	Literature & Education	Jammu & Kashmir
1968	Shambu Nath Mukheerjee	Social Work	West Bengal
1968	Krishna Swaroop Mullick	Civil Service	Delhi
1968	S. Narasimhan	Social Work	Tamil Nadu
1968	Sis Ram Ola	Social Work	Rajasthan
1968	Jaikishan Dahyabhai Panchal	Arts	Maharashtra
1968	Balasaheb Amgonda Patil	Literature & Education	Maharashtra
1968	Ayodhya Prasad	Arts	Uttar Pradesh
1968	Shanker Singh Ram Raghuvanshi	Arts	Maharashtra
1968	Raja Ramanna	Science & Engineering	Tamil Nadu
1968	Man Singh M. Rana	Science & Engineering	Delhi
1968	Abhin Chandra Rao	Medicine	Odisha
1968	Akkineni Nageswara Rao	Arts	Andhra Pradesh
1968	N. T. Rama Rao	Arts	Andhra Pradesh
1968	Sudha Venkatasiva Reddy	Social Work	Karnataka
1968	Devi Lal Samar	Arts	Rajasthan
1968	Donty Naranappa Krishnaia Setty	Social Work	Karnataka
1968	Devchand Chaggan Lal Shah	Literature & Education	Maharashtra
1968	Calambur Sivaramamurti	Literature & Education	Delhi
1968	Sudheer Sojwal	Arts	Maharashtra
1968	Mantosh Sondhi	Civil Service	Haryana
1968	Vyjayanthimala	Arts	Tamil Nadu
1969	Khwaja Ahmad Abbas	Arts	Maharashtra
1969	David Abraham Cheulkar	Arts	Maharashtra
1969	B. K. Anand	Medicine	Delhi
1969	Ramakrishna Ananthakrishnan	Science & Engineering	Maharashtra
1969	Tarapada Basu	Literature & Education	–
1969	Narayan Shridhar Bendre	Arts	Maharashtra
1969	Nautam Bhatt	Science & Engineering	Delhi
1969	Chandu Borde	Sports	Maharashtra
1969	S. D. Burman	Arts	West Bengal
1969	Ram Kumar Caroli	Medicine	Uttar Pradesh
1969	Amrik Singh Cheema	Science & Engineering	Punjab
1969	Shri Chand Chhabra	Civil Service	Delhi
1969	Gopaldas Neogi Chowdhury	Social Work	West Bengal
1969	Brahm Nath ‘Qasir’ Datta	Literature & Education	West Bengal
1969	Yogeshwar Dayal	Science & Engineering	Delhi
1969	Subodh Chandra Dev	Civil Service	Assam
1969	B. Saroja Devi	Arts	Karnataka
1969	Pandurang Vasudeo Gadgil	Literature & Education	Maharashtra
1969	Pandurang Rajaram Ghogrey	Social Work	Maharashtra
1969	Surendra Nath Ghosh	Literature & Education	Uttar Pradesh
1969	Kalyan Singh Gupta	Social Work	Delhi
1969	Shyam Lal Gupta	Literature & Education	Delhi
1969	Lila Indrasen	Social Work	Puducherry
1969	Kishandas Bhagwandas Kapadia	Social Work	Maharashtra
1969	Mahendra Nath Kapur	Literature & Education	Punjab
1969	Gajanan Digambar Madgulkar	Literature & Education	Maharashtra
1969	T. V. Mahalingam	Science & Engineering	Tamil Nadu
1969	Upendra Maharathi	Trade & Industry	Bihar
1969	Kaviraj Ashuthosh Majumdar	Medicine	Uttar Pradesh
1969	K.S.A. Khader Ghulam Mohideen	Trade & Industry	Tamil Nadu
1969	Sudhir Krishna Mukherjee	Civil Service	Delhi
1969	H. Govindrao Srinivasa Murthy	Science & Engineering	Kerala
1969	Thiagarajan Muthian	Literature & Education	Tamil Nadu
1969	Srinivasa Natarajan	Literature & Education	Tamil Nadu
1969	Revanasiddappa Basappagowda Patil	Social Work	Karnataka
1969	Roshan Phooken	Social Work	Assam
1969	V. Subbiah Pillai	Literature & Education	Tamil Nadu
1969	Kumar Nandan Prasad	Civil Service	Uttar Pradesh
1969	Amrita Pritam	Literature & Education	Delhi
1969	Indrani Rahman	Arts	Delhi
1969	Bishan Lal Raina	Medicine	Delhi
1969	Ram Lal Rajgarhia	Trade & Industry	Delhi
1969	Vulimiri Ramalingaswami	Medicine	Andhra Pradesh
1969	T. Varadachari Ramanujam	Social Work	Maharashtra
1969	Rajam Ramaswamy	Social Work	Tamil Nadu
1969	N. Balakrishna Reddy	Social Work	Andhra Pradesh
1969	Balraj Sahni	Arts	Punjab
1969	Savitri Sahni	Science & Engineering	Uttar Pradesh
1969	Krishna Gopal Saxena	Medicine	Delhi
1969	Sadashiv Rath Sharma	Arts	Odisha
1969	Dhyan Pal Singh	Civil Service	Uttarakhand
1969	Sukhdev Singh	Arts	Maharashtra
1969	S. N. Swamy	Arts	Andhra Pradesh
1969	Mangru Ganu Uikey	Social Work	Madhya Pradesh
1969	Nand Kishore Verma	Medicine	Haryana

== Explanatory notes ==
Non-citizen recipients
