= Binaca =

Binaca may refer to:

- Binaca Geetmala, a weekly radio show
- Binaca, Upi, an inactive volcano in Aguindanao province, Philippines
- Binaca (breath spray), a brand of breath spray
- Binaca (brand), a toothpaste brand in India
