= Cibaca =

Cibaca may refer to:

- Cibaca (brand), a toothpaste brand owned by Colgate-Palmolive
  - Cibaca Geetmala, a Hindi-language radio countdown show
- Čibača, a village in Croatia
