= Veeraraghavan =

Veeraraghavan is a surname. Notable people with the surname include:

- Avinash Veeraraghavan (born 1975), Indian artist
- Malathi Veeraraghavan (1962–2020), Indian and American network engineer
- Natteri Veeraraghavan (1913–2004), Indian physician, microbiologist, and medical researcher
- P. S. Veeraraghavan (born 1948), Indian scientist and aerospace engineer
