= Vasant Rao Uikey =

Indian politician

Vasant Rao Uikey (17 June 1928 – 15 November 1997) was an Indian politician and a Cabinet Minister from the state of Madhya Pradesh. He served as an MLA in the 1st, 2nd, 3rd, 4th, 5th and 6th Vidhan Sabha of the Government of Madhya Pradesh.

== Early life and family ==
Vasant Rao Uikey was born at Village Wadhona, Tahseel Brahmpuri, Distt. Chandrapur, Maharashtra. He was the son of former Member of Parliament and renowned social activist Honourable Padma Shri Mangru Ganu Uikey.

He finished his formal education from Jabalpur and graduated from Sagar University in 1950. In 1950–51, he worked as the editor of Sachitra Adimjati Sevak, a monthly magazine founded by his father. He was married to Smt. Usha, and has three sons and a daughter. He maintained his permanent residence in Bhopal, Madhya Pradesh.

== Political life ==
One of the most distinguished political leaders in the history of the state of Madhya Pradesh, Vasant Rao Uikey was recognized as a leading tribal politician of the country. He was admired highly for his honesty and administrative brilliance and regarded as a potential chief ministerial candidate.

He is credited for his relentless contribution of 50 years towards the administration, development and governance of the state and a life devoted for the upliftment and welfare of the poor, oppressed, victimized, rural and backward castes.

He joined active politics right after his student life. He was elected as an MLA from Lakhnadon Vidhansabha constituency at a young age of 24 in the year 1952. He served as an MLA consistently from 1952 to 1980 representing the Vidhansabha constituency of Lakhnadon and Ghansor, Distt. Seoni. He worked as Deputy Minister, State Minister and Cabinet Minister under various ministers, and headed 17 departments of the state in his political career.

He also acted as an active and former President of Madhya Pradesh Congress Party.

A momentous achievement during his term was the accomplishment of Nationalization of the Trade of Tendu Leaves and its enforcement in the state for the welfare of tribals and people of the forest against heavy opposition.

== Political career ==
Member of Legislative Assembly (MLA) – (i) First Vidhan Sabha, 1956–57 (ii) Second Vidhan Sabha, 1957–62, (iii) Third Vidhan Sabha, 1962–67, (iv) Fourth Vidhan Sabha, 1967–72, (v) Fifth Vidhan Sabha, 1972–77, and (vi) Sixth Vidhan Sabha, 1977–80 from Lakhnadon and Ghansor Vidhansabha constituency of Madhya Pradesh.

=== Ministerial positions held in government of Madhya Pradesh ===
(i) State Minister of Forest in 1966,

(ii) Minister of Public Health in 1967,

(iii) Minister of Commerce and Industry in 1969 and 1971,

(iv) Minister of Tourism in 1971, 1972 and 1973,

(v) Minister of Cooperatives in 1972 and 1973,

(vi) Minister of Agriculture in 1972, 1973 and 1974.

(vii) Minister of Tribal Welfare and Scheduled Caste Welfare in 1972, 1973 and 1974.

(viii) Minister of Food and Civil Supplies in 1972, 1973 and 1974.

(xi) Minister of Power and Irrigation in 1974 and 1975

(x) Minister of Education in 1976 and 1977.

== Administrative work ==
President of (i) Madhya Pradesh Audyogik Kendra Vikas Nigam, 1986–90, (ii) Madhya Pradesh State Backward Class Commission, 1993–96, (iii) Madhya Pradesh State Scheduled Tribe Commission, 1996, (iv) Tribal Finance Corporation.

Vice President of Primary School Teachers Union, Mandla

Secretary of Vanvasi Seva Mandal, Hoshangabad

Member of (i) Madhya Pradesh Estimates Committee, (ii) Forest Expansion Committee, (iii) Mission School Inspection Committee, (iv) Madhya Pradesh Oil Selection Board, 1992–94, (v) Madhya Pradesh Khadi and Village Industries Board.

== Honour ==
Vasant Rao Uikey was popularly known as a people's leader.

On his death, the State Legislative Assembly of Madhya Pradesh broke the traditional norm of 5 minutes tribute, and adjourned the proceedings for an entire day as a tribute to his virtuous, ideal and inspirational life.
