= Nutakki (disambiguation) =

Nutakki or Nuthakki (Telugu: నూతక్కి) is a village in Mangalagiri mandal in Guntur district of Andhra Pradesh.

Nutakki (Telugu: నూతక్కి) is a Telugu surname:

- Nuthakki Bhanu Prasad - was an Indian chemical engineer, bureaucrat and a former chairman of the Oil and Natural Gas Commission.
- Nutakki Priyanka, is an Indian Woman International Master
- Nutakki Ramaseshaiah - was an Indian lawyer, politician and Member of Parliament.
