= Chinnappadass =

- Poster
- Directed by: C. V. Rajendran
- Written by: M. G. Vallabhan (dialogues)
- Produced by: Chithra Ramu; Chitra Lakshmanan
- Starring: Sathyaraj; Radha
- Cinematography: A. Sabapathy
- Edited by: N. Chandran
- Music by: Ilaiyaraaja
- Production company: Seethalakshmi Art Films
- Release date: 28 July 1989
- Country: India
- Language: Tamil

Chinnappadass is a 1989 Indian Tamil-language film directed by C. V. Rajendran, his final film as director. The film stars Sathyaraj and Radha. It is a remake of the 1987 Hindi film Insaaf. The film was released on 28 July 1989.

== Plot ==
Chinnappadass, who is a post-graduate in law and a law college professor, gets suspended from his teaching job when he thrashes rowdies who happen to be the children of corrupt ministers who tried to molest his sister. Due to compulsion, Chinnappadass had to join the smuggling gang of Ravi Prakash. When Dileep tries to rape Radha, she commits suicide. Chinnappadass then pretends to be amnesiac to find the truth. However, he is shocked to find Radha's look alike twin sister who is Dr. Kavitha. In the end, Chinnappadass with the help of Inspector Balaraman catches all baddies and finally marries Dr. Kavitha.

== Cast ==
- Sathyaraj as Chinnappadass
- Radha as Inspector Radha and Dr. Kavitha
- Kodai Mazhai Vidya
- S. S. Chandran as Inspector Balaram
- Captain Raju as Ravi Prakash
- Ravichandran
- Nassar as Dileep
- Delhi Ganesh
- Veeraraghavan
- Kuyili
- R. Neelakandan
- Pradeep Sakthi as Micheal De Souza
- Kokila as Chinnappadass's sister

== Soundtrack ==
The soundtrack was composed by Ilaiyaraaja.

Song	Singers	Lyrics
"Athu Ithu Ethuthan"	K. S. Chithra	Vaali
"Vaanam Thodatha Megam"	K. S. Chithra	Vaali
"Paadum Bakthai Meeraa	K. S. Chithra, Mano	Gangai Amaran
"Baley Baley"	K. Veeramani, Malaysia Vasudevan	Gangai Amaran
"Pakku Vethalai"	K. S. Chithra, Malaysia Vasudevan	Gangai Amaran

== Reception ==
P. S. S. of Kalki wrote that the well-chosen exteriors, the settings, the costumes, and the lavishly spent currencies all spent with the intention of doing something useful in a somewhat believable story would have been overwhelming.
