= Oru Nokku Kanan =

- Poster
- Directed by: Sajan
- Written by: Asha Mathew
- Screenplay by: S.N. Swamy; Dialogue: Kaloor Dennis
- Produced by: P. T. Xavier
- Starring: Mammootty; Ambika; Shalini; Shankar; Menaka
- Cinematography: Anandakuttan
- Music by: Shyam
- Release date: 28 June 1985
- Country: India
- Language: Malayalam

Oru Nokku Kanan is an Indian Malayalam film, directed by Sajan and produced by P. T. Xavier in 1985. The film stars Mammootty, Ambika, Shalini and Shankar. The film has musical score by Shyam.

== Plot ==
Maya, a labour officer sees her ex-lover, Jayadevan who ditched her. She bore a child with him. Jayadevan from unfortunate circumstances wasn't able to get in touch with Maya and didn't know they had a child together from their relationship. Years later, they are neighbors, Jayadevan is a widowed factory owner, Maya is a labour officer who has to conduct regular inspections at the factory as a part of her work. They both are single parents with a child that looks alike. The film explores whether Maya and Jayadevan be able to rekindle their love.

== Cast ==
- Mammootty as Jayadevan
- Ambika as Maya
- Baby Shalini as Chinnukkutti / Unnimol
- Shankar as Shankar
- Menaka as Sandhya
- Sukumari as Vilasini
- Lalu Alex as Gopan
- Mala Aravindan as Vidyadharan
- Innocent as Innochen
- V. D. Rajappan as Kunjandi
- Adoor Bhavani as Kathreena

== Release ==
The film was released on 1985.

=== Critical reception ===
The film received rave reviews from the audience. The film's success was mainly due to Mammootty - Shalini (Baby Shalini at that time) combo. Both the songs also received wide appreciation.

=== Box office ===
The film was both commercial and critical success and it earned a cult status.

== Soundtrack ==
All lyrics are written by Chunakkara Ramankutty; all music is composed by Shyam.

No.	Title	Artist(s)	Length
1.	"Chandanakkuriyumaayi"	K. S. Chithra, Unni Menon
2.	"Chinnukkutty Urangeele"	K. S. Chithra, Unni Menon
