= Kulsum Sayani =

Indian Muslim woman freedom fighter (1900 – 1987)

- Born: October 21, 1900
- Died: May 27, 1987 (aged 86)
- Movement: Indian independence movement
- Children: Ameen Sayani (son) Hamid Sayani (son)
- Awards: Padma Shri, Jawaharlal Nehru Award

Kulsum Sayani (21 October 1900 – 27 May 1987) was an Indian Muslim woman freedom fighter, social worker, educational activist and Gandhian nationalist. She joined Mahatma Gandhi along with her father as well as her husband Dr. Jaan Mohammad Sayani.

== Early life and background ==
She was born on 21 October 1900 in Gujarat. Kulsum claimed to improve India's literacy rates and became a member of the Charkha Class.

== Life ==
She met Mahatma Gandhi in 1917, accompanied by her father and became a follower. During the Indian National Movement, she actively fought for social reforms. She participated in the Indian Freedom Struggle. Additionally, she played a role in the Jan Jagaran programs organized by the Indian National Congress to raise awareness about social issues. Sayani also worked in Mumbai and its suburbs. However, the leaders of the Muslim League did not support her activities. They believed that she was enticing impoverished communities to join the Indian National Congress and organized counter programs to negate her efforts.

She promoted education among adults by starting a fortnightly Urdu publication called Helper. She also travelled internationally and represented India in several conferences.

== Personal life ==
She married another freedom fighter, Dr. Jaan Mohamad Sayani who was son of Rahimtulla M. Sayani a pioneer lawyer. Her older son Hamid Sayani was actor, radio personality, and magician, famous for running Bournvita Quiz Contest. Her younger son Ameen Sayani was radio personality and master of ceremonies famous for his voice and hosting Binaca Geetmala.

== Literary works ==
- Proudha Siksha mein Mere Anubhav
- Bharat-Pak Maitri – Mere Prayatn
- Bharateeya Swatantra Sangram mein Mahilaon ki Bhumika
- Bharat mein Proudh Siksha

== Awards ==
In 1959 she was acknowledged by the Government of India, who gave her the Padma Shri award. In 1969, she received the Jawaharlal Nehru Award from the President of India for contributions to literature.

== Death ==
Kulsum Sayani died on 27 May, 1987.

== Bibliography ==
- Sharma, Rinkal (2024). Forgotten Gems : 75 Brave Women of India (1st ed.). New Delhi: Diamond Pocket Books Pvt Ltd. ISBN 978-9359646152.
