= Guduru Gopal Rao =

Microbiologist

Doctor Guduru Gopal Rao
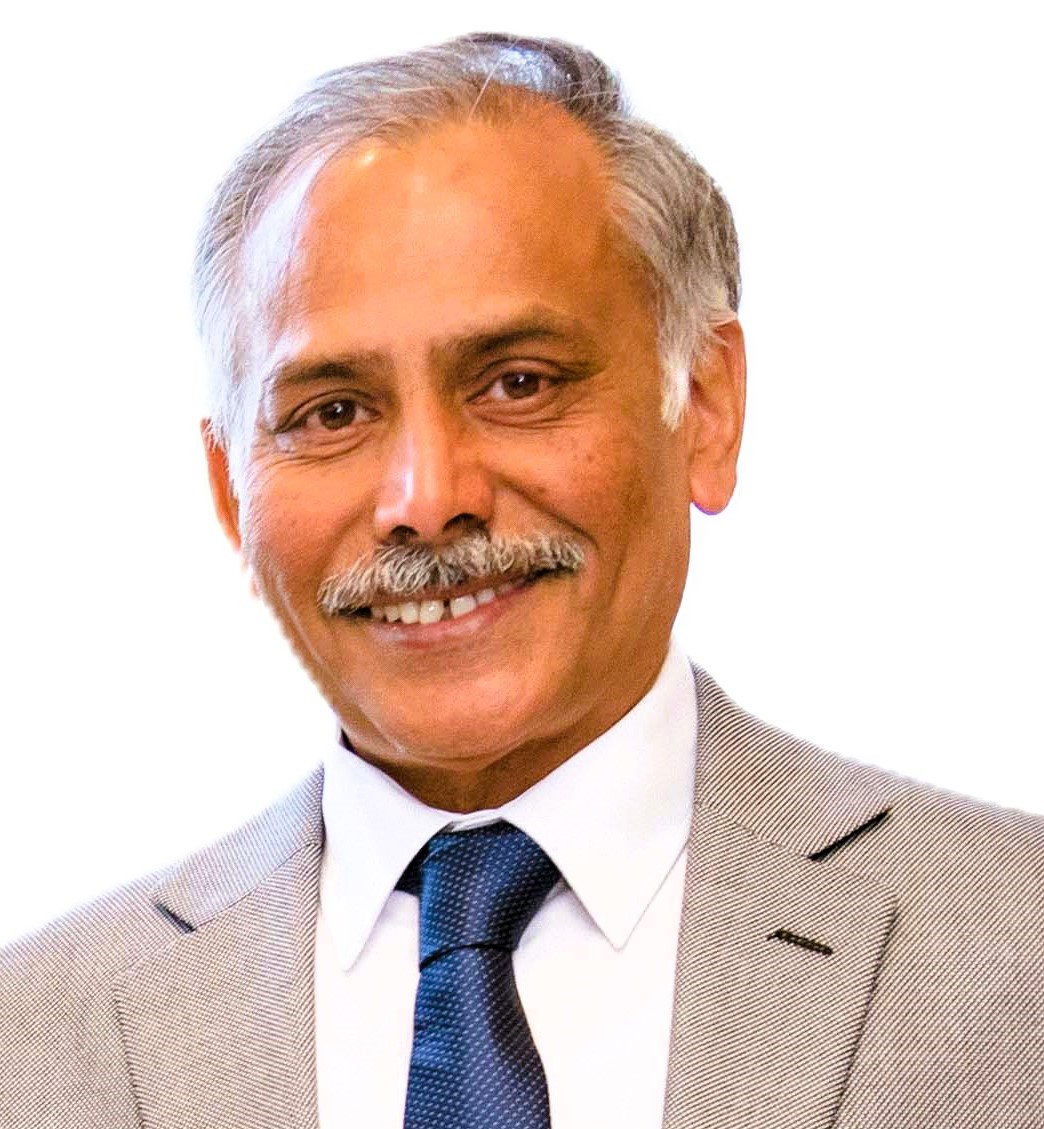
- Born: 1954 (age 71–72)
- Education: Armed Forces Medical College, Pune
- Occupation: Microbiologist
- Spouse: Nirmala Rao
- Awards: OBE
- Medical career
- Research: Microbiology Infection control

Guduru Gopal Rao (born 1954, Cuttack, India) has worked as a consultant in National Health Service since 1990 and is currently the head of the Department of Antimicrobial Stewardship and Clinical Microbiology at London North West University Healthcare NHS Trust. Rao is a fellow of the Royal College of Pathologists, United Kingdom.

Rao led the teams that introduced alcohol based hand disinfectants at the end of beds in hospitals for the first time in the UK, in University Hospital Lewisham, back in the early 2000s.

Rao also introduced universal Methicillin Resistant Staphylococcus Aureus (MRSA) screening at the point of hospital admission for the first time in the UK leading to reduced infection rates. This was later mandated to become national policy.

Rao is an expert advisor for Group B Strep Support and introduced routine Group B Streptococcus (GBS) screening of pregnant women in London North West University Healthcare NHS Trust for the first time in the UK.

== Early life ==
Rao was born in Cuttack, India in 1954, last of eight children of Guduru Venkatachalam (pioneer of green revolution) and great nephew of Guduru Ramachandra Rao (founder of the movement for emancipation of the socially downtrodden Adi Andhra caste in Andhra Pradesh in 1917).

== Education ==
Rao graduated from the Armed Forces Medical College, Pune and completed post graduation in medical microbiology from Madras Medical College, Chennai.

== Research work ==
Rao worked at the National Institute of Virology in Pune, India during 1982-1983 studying epidemiology of enterically transmitted Non-A, non-B hepatitis which was later renamed at Hepatitis E. Rao has authored over 130 peer-reviewed scientific publications in infection control and clinical microbiology.

== Awards ==
In the 2009 Queen's Birthday Honours, Rao was appointed an Officer of the Order of the British Empire (OBE) for his services to medicine.
