= Kishor S. Trivedi =

American computer scientist

- Education: University of Illinois Urbana-Champaign; Indian Institute of Technology Bombay
- Known for: Reliability and Performance Evaluation Stochastic modeling formalisms Software Aging and Rejuvenation
- Awards: Technical Achievement Award. IEEE Computer Society. 2008 Life Fellow. IEEE. 2017 IEEE Reliability Society – Lifetime Achievement Award 2021
- Scientific career
- Fields: Computer Science
- Workplaces: Duke University
- Doctoral advisor: James Evans Robertson; J. Richard Phillips
- Doctoral students: Joanne Dugan; Malathi Veeraraghavan
- Website: https://ece.duke.edu/faculty/kishor-trivedi

Kishor Shridharbhai Trivedi is an Indian-American computer scientist who is currently the Hudson Chaired Professor in department of electrical and computer engineering at Duke University.

== Education ==
Kishor S. Trivedi was born in India. He graduated from Indian Institutes of Technology Bombay in 1968 with B.Tech. in electrical engineering. He received a master's degree in computer science in 1972, and a PhD in computer science, both from the University of Illinois at Urbana-Champaign (UIUC) under supervision of James Evans Robertson and J. Richard Philips.

== Career ==
Kishor S. Trivedi is currently the Hudson Chaired Professor in department of electrical and computer engineering at Duke University. He has been on the Duke faculty since 1975.

== Books ==
He wrote three well-known books including the bluebook "Probability and Statistics with Reliability, Queuing and Computer Science Applications", redbook "Performance and Reliability Analysis of Computer Systems: An Example-Based Approach Using the SHARPE Software Package" and whitebook "Queueing Networks and Markov Chains". In addition to these three books, he recently wrote a greenbook "Reliability and Availability Engineering".

== Publications ==
He has published more than 500 articles in international conferences, journals.

== Honors ==
He is an Institute of Electrical and Electronics Engineers (IEEE) fellow and a Life fellow of IEEE. He received 2008 IEEE Computer Society Technical Achievement Award “For pioneering contributions to the understanding of the phenomena of software aging and software rejuvenation." He is an elected member of the IFIP Working Group 10.4 on Dependable Computing and Fault-Tolerance.
