= Ameen Sayani =

Indian radio personality (1932–2024)

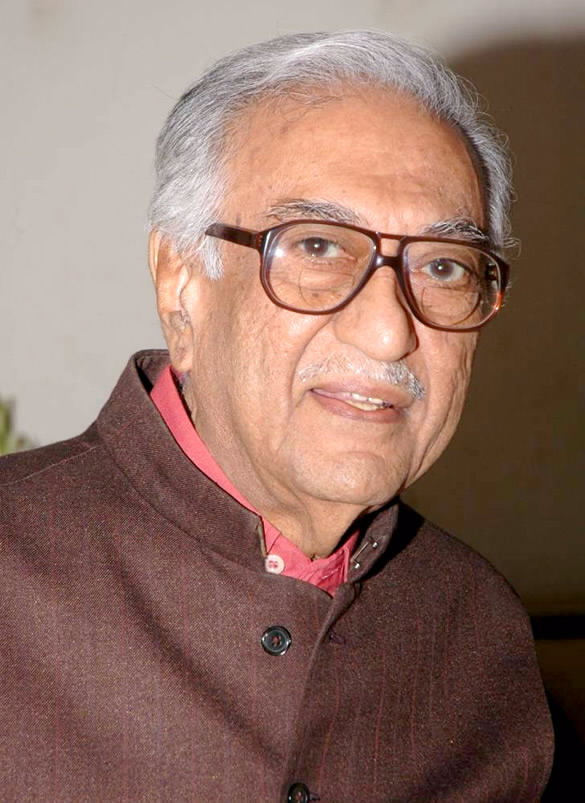
- Sayani in 2012
- Born: 21 December 1932; Bombay, Bombay Presidency, British India (now Mumbai, Maharashtra, India)
- Died: 20 February 2024 (aged 91); Mumbai, Maharashtra, India
- Citizenship: Indian
- Education: Scindia School
- Alma mater: St. Xavier's College
- Occupations: Announcer, Radio jockey
- Years active: 1951–2024
- Spouse: Rama (deceased)
- Parent: Kulsum Sayani (mother)
- Relatives: Rahimtulla M. Sayani (grandfather)
- Website: ameensayani.com

Ameen Sayani (21 December 1932 – 20 February 2024) was an Indian radio announcer. He achieved fame and popularity across the Indian subcontinent when he presented his Binaca Geetmala programme of top hit songs from Hindi cinema over the airwaves of Radio Ceylon. He was one of the most imitated announcers. His style of addressing the audience with "Behno aur Bhaiyo " (meaning "sisters and brothers") as against the traditional "Bhaiyo aur Behno" is still treated as an announcement with a melodious touch. He had produced, compered (or provided voice-overs for) over 54,000 radio programmes and 19,000 spots/jingles since 1951.

== Early life ==
Ameen Sayani was born on 21 December 1932 into a Gujarati Muslim Khoja family in Bombay (now Mumbai). His parents were Kulsoom and Dr. Jan Mohammed Sayani. His mother was a freedom fighter and was close to Mahatma Gandhi, which is why Sayani called himself a Gandhian. He was the grandson of Rahimtulla M. Sayani, a pioneer lawyer who had served as the President of the Indian National Congress.

== Career ==
Ameen Sayani was introduced to All India Radio, Bombay, by his brother Hamid Sayani. Ameen participated in English programmes there for ten years.

Later, he helped popularise All India Radio in India. Sayani was also a part of various movies throughout the years like Bhoot Bungla, Teen Devian, Boxer, and Qatl. He appeared in all of these movies in the role of an announcer in some event.

Sayani assisted his mother, Kulsum Sayani, in editing, publishing and printing a fortnightly journal for neo-literates, under the instructions of Mahatma Gandhi. The fortnightly, RAHBER (1940 to 1960), was simultaneously published in the Devnagri (Hindi), Urdu and Gujarati scripts – but all in the simple "Hindustani" language promoted by Gandhi.

It was this grounding in simple communication that helped him in his long career of commercial broadcasting, and culminated in his being awarded the "Hindi Ratna Puraskaar" by the prestigious Hindi Bhavan of New Delhi in 2007.

One little known fact about him is that he worked in the marketing Department of Tata Oil Mills Ltd. during 1960–62 as Brand Executive – mainly looking after their toilet soaps: Hamam and Jai.

Between All India Radio (from 1951), AIR's Commercial Service (from 1970) and various foreign stations (from 1976), Sayani produced, compered (or spoke for) over 54,000 radio programmes and 19,000 spots/jingles. (The fact is recorded in the Limca Book of Records.)

=== Radio shows produced and compered ===
Some of the better known radio shows produced (mainly for consumer product clients):

- CIBACA (formerly BINACA) GEETMALA: broadcast from 1952 – mainly over Radio Ceylon, and later over Vividh Bharati (AIR) – for a total of over 42 years. It was again revived after a gap of 4 years, and was aired over the National Network of Vividh Bharati for 2 years as COLGATE CIBACA GEETMALA.
- S. KUMARS KA FILMI MUQADDAMA and FILMI MULAQAAT: over AIR and Vividh Bharati for 7 years. Re-commenced, after a decade, on Vividh Bharati for a year.
- SARIDON KE SAATHI: 4 years. (AIR's first sponsored show.)
- BOURNVITA QUIZ CONTEST (in English): 8 years. (Took over from his brother and guru, Hamid Sayani, after his death in 1975.)
- SHALIMAR SUPERLAC JODI: 7 years.
- MARATHA DARBAR shows: SITARON KI PASAND, CHAMAKTAY SITARAY, MEHEKTI BAATEN, etc. : 14 years.
- SANGEET KAY SITARON KI MEHFIL : 4 years – and still running (in 2014). (The format comprises interviews and musical career sketches of top singers, composers and lyricists; syndicated to various radio stations in India and abroad for their commercial clients.)

Sayani also produced a 13-episode radio series in the form of plays based on actual HIV/AIDS cases – including interviews with eminent doctors and social workers. (The series – entitled Swanaash – was commissioned by All India Radio, and its audio cassettes have been acquired by many NGOs for their fieldwork.)

=== Audio communication on compact discs (and earlier on LPs and cassettes) ===
After producing several audio features on cassettes, LPs and CDs, Sayani was producing (for Saregama India Ltd) an unusual retrospective of his flagship radio show Geetmala on CDs. The series is called "GEETMALA KI CHHAON MEIN", of which 40 volumes (in packs of five CDs each) have already been produced and released. The volumes have been well appreciated in India and abroad.

Sayani pioneered the export of Indian radio shows and commercials from 1976 onwards. He exported to the USA, Canada, England, the UAE, Eswatini, Mauritius, South Africa, Fiji and New Zealand. In addition, he compered several shows directly for radio stations abroad.

=== International radio shows ===
- "MINI INSERTIONS of FILMSTAR INTERVIEWS" : Over the British Broadcasting Corporation's Ethnic Network in the UK: 35 instalments.
- "MUSIC FOR THE MILLIONS" : For the BBC's World Service Radio: 6 episodes.
- "VEETEE KA HUNGAMA" : Over Sunrise Radio, London: 4½ years.
- "GEETMALA KI YAADEN": Over Radio Ummul Quwain, UAE: 4 years.
- "YE BHI CHANGA WO BHI KHOOB" : Over Radio Asia, UAE: 8 months.
- "HANGAMAY" : Over ethnic radio stations in Toronto, Washington, Houston, Los Angeles, San Francisco and Boston: 2½ years.
- "SANGEET PAHELI" : Over Radio Truro, Eswatini: 1 year.

=== Stage Compering ===
Sayani compered over 2,000 stage functions of all sorts in India, including musical variety shows, beauty contests, fashion shows, award functions, film silver jubilee functions, the International Film Festival closing session (in Delhi), concerts, seminars, workshops, and trade presentations. He also compered stage shows abroad – in the US, Canada, the UK, South Africa, the UAE, the Netherlands and the West Indies.

=== In Bollywood ===
Song "Tamma Tamma Again" in movie Badrinath Ki Dulhania was remix of 90's popular Bollywood song Tamma Tamma featuring a Voiceover by Ameen Sayani.

As of 2014, Sayani was still active in radio in India.

== Personal life ==
Sayani married a Kashmiri Pandit, Rama Mattu, a fellow voice artist and singer.

== Death ==
He died of a heart attack on 20 February 2024 at the age of 91.

== Honours and awards ==
In 2009, he was presented with the Padma Shri award. Apart from this, Ameen Sayani was a laureate of numerous awards such as:

- Living Legend Award (2006) from loopFederation of Indian Chambers of Commerce & Industry, with India Radio Forum
- Kaan Hall of Fame Award (2003) from Radio Mirchi (FM Network of the Times Group)
- Golden Abby by Advertising Club, Bombay (2000) for the OUTSTANDING RADIO CAMPAIGN OF THE CENTURY ( "Binaca/Cibaca GEETMALA" ).
- Hall of Fame Award (1993) from Indian Academy of Advertising Film Art (IAAFA)
- Person of the Year Award (1992) Limca Book of Records
- Gold medal (1991) from Indian Society of Advertisers (ISA) presented by Mr. K.R. Narayanan, then Vice-President of India.

== See also ==
- List of Binaca Geetmala annual chart toppers
