= Brij Krishna Chandiwala =

Indian freedom fighter

Brij Krishna Chandiwala was an Indian freedom fighter from Delhi and a political associate of Mahatma Gandhi who was awarded the Padma Shri in 1963 for his contributions to the field of social work.

== Early life and education ==
Brij Krishna was born in 1900, the sixth child of Banarsidas Chandiwala and Janki Devi. The Chandiwalas were a family of silver traders of Chandni Chowk in Delhi. He was educated at St Stephen's College, Delhi where he met Gandhi, who had gone there as a guest of the college principal, S. K. Rudra, in 1918.

== Gandhi's associate ==
His meeting with Gandhi deeply influenced Chandiwala and he became an ardent follower and close associate of Gandhi. Chandiwala took to spartan meals and to wearing khadi under Gandhi's influence. Also, he took to himself the task of supplying Gandhiji his goat's milk whenever he stayed in Delhi and his earnestness in this matter earned him the nickname gwalin (milkmaid) from Dr. M A Ansari.

During the 1930s, Chandiwala helped organise the stone breakers of Delhi into a union and took up cases of violation of their rights with the Delhi administrators and in courts of law to ensure better compliance to government regulations regarding their work and to get compensation for them. While in Delhi, Gandhi used to stay at Chandiwala's house and Gandhi's 21-day fast for communal harmony in 1924 was undertaken there. Chandiwala was with Gandhi on the day of his assassination and it was he who prepared Gandhi's body for cremation.

== Social work ==
After Independence, Chandiwala took to social work and became a founding member and president of the Bharat Sewak Samaj and Sadachar Samiti. In 1952 he founded the Shri Banarsidas Chandiwala Sewa Smarak Trust Society which was initially headed by Gandhi's son Devdas. The trust runs several hospital and educational institutes in Delhi including the Janki Devi College for Women which has been named in honour of his mother. For his contributions to the field of social work Chandiwala was awarded the Padma Shri in 1963.

== Books ==
Chandiwala authored a three volume book in Hindi titled Bapu Ke Charanon Mein which was later translated into English as At the Feet of Bapu. His other notable work is the Gandhiji ki Delhi Diary which chronicles Gandhi's days in Delhi.
