= Ernest Borges =

Indian oncologist and surgeon (1909–1969)

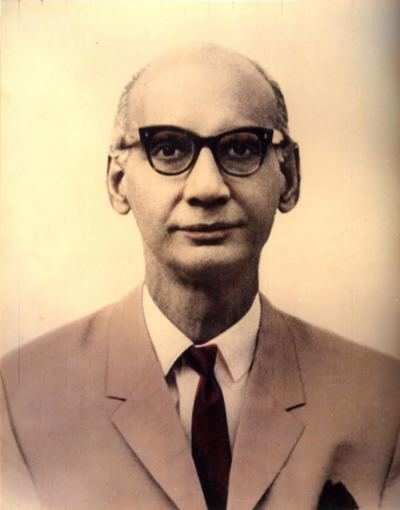
- Portrait of Ernest Borges
- Born: Ernest Joachim Joseph Borges; 1909; Bombay, Bombay Presidency, British India
- Died: 3 March 1969 (aged 59–60); Tata Memorial Hospital, Mumbai, India
- Education: MBBS, MS, Fellowship of the Royal College of Surgeons (FRCS)
- Alma mater: Grant Medical College, University of Bombay
- Occupations: Oncologist, Cancer Surgeon
- Known for: Pioneering cancer treatment in India
- Spouse: Gracie Soares (m. 1946)
- Children: Anita; Renee
- Awards: Padma Shri (1966); Order of St. Gregory the Great

Ernest Joachim Joseph Borges FRCS (1909 - 3 March 1969) was an Indian oncologist and cancer surgeon known for his contributions to the field of oncology in India. He pioneered cancer treatment in India during a period when radiation therapy and chemotherapy were in their early stages of development, while surgery remained the predominant option for cancer patients. He served as the Director and Superintendent of Tata Memorial Hospital from 1967 to 1969. In 1966, he was honored with the Padma Shri, the third highest civilian award, by the Government of India.

== Early life and education ==
Ernest Joachim Joseph Borges was born in Bombay (now Mumbai) in 1909 to Cajetan Francis Borges and Inez de Nazaré. The family was from Ucassaim, Goa.

Borges received his early education at St. Teresa's High School in Girgaon and later attended St. Xavier's High School and College in Dhobitalao. He pursued his medical degree (MBBS) from Grant Medical College and furthered his studies by obtaining an MS degree with distinction from the University of Bombay. He went on to pursue a Fellowship of the Royal College of Surgeons (FRCS) in England. He was trained at Memorial Hospital in New York.

== Career ==
Borges joined Tata Memorial Hospital in Bombay, where he served as a chief surgeon for nearly three decades. His expertise in esophageal cancer surgery, particularly noteworthy during a time when few dared to undertake such procedures, earned him acclaim both nationally and internationally. He was instrumental in establishing Tata Memorial Hospital as a premier institution for cancer treatment in India.

He was closely associated with the Catholic Church. He served as president for three terms at the St. Luke's Medical Guild, an organization of Catholic medical professionals established by the then Archbishop of Bombay. He was the editor of the medical journal, the Catholic Medical Bulletin, which was published by the Archdiocese of Bombay. He served as the President of the Indian Federation of Catholic Medical Guilds since 1964. He was also elected as the vice president of the International Federation of Catholic Medical Associations in 1966.

== Personal life ==
Borges married Gracie Soares on 27 April 1946. The couple had six children, however, one of their daughters survived for only one day. He is the father of oncopathologist Anita Borges and evolutionary biologist Renee Borges. In 1964, he and his wife had a private audience with Pope Paul VI when the Pope visited India for the Eucharistic congress.

== Death ==
Borges died of cancer on 3 March 1969 at the Tata Memorial Hospital in Mumbai.

== Awards and recognition ==
In 1966, he was honored with the Padma Shri by the President of India, Sarvepalli Radhakrishnan, in recognition of his contributions to the field of medicine.

He received the Knighthood of the Order of St. Gregory the Great from the Pope and was also honored with the Order of the Privy Chamberlain, Cape, and Sword for his dedicated service to suffering humanity. He was the recipient of the Charles Morehead Prize in Clinical Medicine.

The Goa Branch of the Indian Cancer Society released cancer seals/stamps featuring his photo on September 7, 1971, commemorating Ernest's birth anniversary.

== Legacy ==
Borges was also a philanthropist, and he established Ernest's Ark: The Dr. Ernest Borges Memorial Home in Mumbai, which provides care and support to cancer patients and their families.

Borges' life and work are the subject of a biography book titled, In Ernest Quest: EJ Borges, Legendary and Revered Cancer Surgeon, written by his daughter Renee Borges. The book was released in January 2023 and covers all aspects of Borges' life and lifestyle, including his personal and professional relationships, his research, and his contributions to the field of oncology. The book also includes eulogies and tributes from colleagues and patients who knew and worked with Borges.

Roads named after him include Dr. Ernest Borges Road in front of Tata Memorial Hospital in Parel, Mumbai, as well as roads in Dona Paula and Ucassaim, Goa.

Tata Memorial Hospital paid tribute to Ernest Borges' centenary and his contributions to cancer surgery by releasing a handbook on 6 September 2009. The handbook documents his journey as a surgeon and mentor at the hospital.

== See also ==
- List of Padma Shri award recipients (1960–1969)
