= Renee Borges =

Indian ecologist and evolutionary biologist

Renee M Borges
- Born: 25 February 1959 (age 67)
- Education: St. Xavier's College, Mumbai, University of Bombay
- Known for: Chemical ecology, Plant-animal interactions, Behavioural ecology, and Evolutionary biology
- Father: Ernest Borges
- Relatives: Anita Borges (sister)
- Scientific career
- Workplaces: Indian Institute of Science, Bangalore
- Doctoral advisor: Ted Fleming

Renee Maria Borges (born 25 February 1959) is an Indian evolutionary biologist and professor at the Centre for Ecological Sciences, Indian Institute of Science. Her work as a scientist has been profiled on India Today. Her research areas are behavioural and sensory ecology with special reference to plant and animal interactions such as figs and fig-wasps. Other areas of research interest include conservation biology and the history and philosophy of science.

== Personal life ==
She is the daughter of noted Indian oncologist, Ernest Borges and is the sister of oncopathologist Anita Borges.

== Education ==
Borges studied science at St. Xavier's College, Mumbai, where she obtained her bachelor's degree with distinction in Zoology and Microbiology in 1979. She obtained her master's degree in animal physiology from the Institute of Science, University of Bombay in 1982. She received a Ph.D from the University of Miami, in Coral Gables, Florida, where her thesis was "Resource heterogeneity and the foraging ecology of the Malabar Giant Squirrel, Ratufa indica".

== Bibliography ==
Borges has contributed a chapter to the book Battles Over Nature: Science and the Politics of Conservation.

== Recognition ==
Borges' appointments include:

- Fellow, Indian Academy of Sciences
- J. C Bose National Fellowship (2016)
- Fellow, Indian National Science Academy
- Chairperson of the DST-Program Advisory Committee on Animal Sciences (2016–19)
- Member, Western Ghat Ecology Expert Panel (WGEEP), Government of India, 2010–2011
