= Raghunath Krishna Phadke =

Indian sculptor

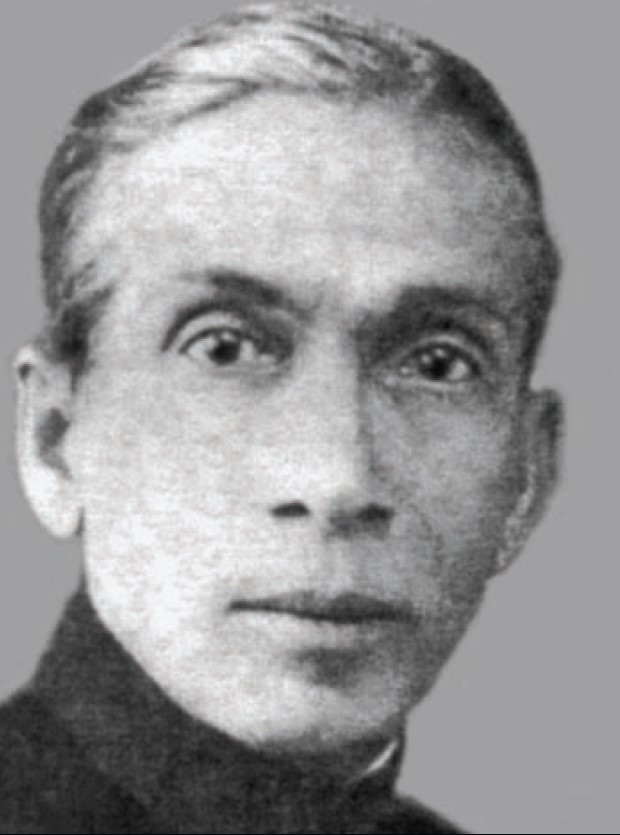
- Born: 27 January 1884
- Died: 17 May 1972 (aged 88)
- Known for: Sculpture
- Awards: Padma Shri (1961)

Raghunath Krishna Phadke (1884–1972) was an Indian sculptor from what was Bombay Presidency for much of his life. He is a winner of 1961 Padma Shri Award.

== Phadke Art Studio ==
Phadke was born in Bassein where he received his early schooling in the Bassein English School. During the first half of the 20th century, the Maharaja of Dhar was a patron of art and would often invite several artists to his kingdom. Phadke was one of those. On his request, Phadke started an art studio in Dhar, a city in Madhya Pradesh. He settled in Dhar in 1933. It is today known as Phadke Art Studio and is located on the outdoors of Dhar Fort.

The museum today has sculptures of many important people from Indian History such as Mahatma Gandhi, Jawaharlal Nehru, Bal Gangadhar Tilak, Ram Mohan Roy, among others. There are also bust statues of kings, queens, local chieftains and spiritual leaders. The studio has all busts lined up in a row in an academic style.

Phadke's own personal legacy of arts can be seen in busts installed in public places in Dhar, Indore and Ujjain.

== Government Institute of Fine Arts, Dhar ==
The Government Institute of Fine Arts, Dhar was founded under Phadke's guidance on 24 November 1939. It is affiliated to Sir J J School of Arts, Mumbai and Indira Kala Sangeet Vishwavidyalaya, Khairagarh, Rajnadgaon, Chhattisgarh. Since 2002, the institute is working under the Higher Education of MP Government.
