= B. S. Kesavan =

Indian librarian (1909 – 2000)

Bellary Shamanna Kesavan
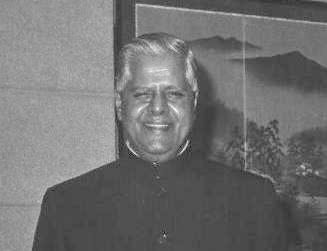
- Born: 10 May 1909
- Died: 16 February 2000 (aged 91)
- Occupation: Librarian
- Awards: Padma Shri

Bellary Shamanna Kesavan (10 May 1909 – 16 February 2000) was the first National Librarian of independent India (1947–1962). He is also known as Father of Indian National Bibliography as it was first brought out in his leadership on 15 August 1958. Later, he became the first Director of the Indian National Scientific Documentation Centre (INSDOC) at New Delhi (1963–1969). In recognition of his great service to the nation, the Government of India honoured him with Padma Shri in 1960. He died on 16 February 2000, at the age of 91.

== Education ==
After graduating from the University of Mysore, he proceeded to England and obtained his master's degree in English Literature and Diploma in Library Science, both from the University of London.

== Career ==
He began his career as a teacher of English in the University of Mysore and served there for several years. He also worked as Assistant Secretary (Editorial) of Council for Scientific and Industrial Research (CSIR) and Curator at Central Bureau of Education. As a National Librarian, he contributed enormously to the building up of the Library, launching of Indian National Bibliography, and nurturing of the Central Reference Library as Librarian-in-Charge.

His achievements in INSDOC is also no less outstanding which include among others the starting of Indian Science Abstracts, and Associateship in Documentation and Reprography course, publication of several union catalogues of scientific serials, and Directory of Scientific Research Institutions in India.

== Positions held ==
He was the head of the National Library of India for two terms, from 1948 to 1963 and from 1970 to 1971. In addition, he held many posts of international and national bodies such as Vice-President of International Federation for Information and Documentation(1964–1966) (FID), President of Indian Library Association (ILA) and member of numerous committees.

== Publications ==
He has to his credit a number of publications, of which the prominent are History of Printing and Publishing in India in 3 volumes and The Book in India: A Compilation.

== Kesavan Institute of Information and Knowledge Management (KIIKM) ==
A charitable trust namely, Kesavan Institute of Information and Knowledge Management (KIIKM) has been formed in memory of him at Secunderabad.
