= Anita Borges =

Indian pathologist (1947–2025)

- Born: Anita Maria Borges; 19 November 1947
- Died: 18 September 2025 (aged 78); Gorakhpur, Uttar Pradesh, India
- Occupations: Oncopathologist and histopathologist
- Father: Ernest Borges
- Relatives: Renee Borges (sister)

Anita Maria Borges (19 November 1947 – 18 September 2025) was an Indian oncopathologist and histopathologist. She was recognised for her diagnostic precision in cancer pathology, her leadership roles in medical institutions, and her contribution to pathology education in India. She was the eldest daughter of Ernest Borges, an oncologist and cancer surgeon at Tata Memorial Hospital, Mumbai. She was widely referred to as the "Queen of Histopathology" in recognition of her role in shaping cancer pathology in India.

== Early life and education ==
Borges was born into a family with a strong medical background. Her father, Ernest Borges, was among India’s pioneering oncologists. She studied at BYL Nair Hospital and Topiwala National Medical College, Mumbai, where she completed her MBBS and MD in Pathology. She is the sister of evolutionary biologist Renee Borges.

Borges completed her MBBS and from BYL Nair Hospital and then pursued an MD in pathology from Topiwala Medical College. She later trained at the Royal Marsden Hospital in London and the Memorial Sloan Kettering Cancer Center in New York, thus learning advanced methods in oncopathology.

== Career ==
Borges worked in pathology and oncology. She retired in 2004 as Professor and Head of Surgical Pathology at Tata Memorial Hospital, Mumbai.

She went on to serve as Director of the Centre for Oncopathology at S.L. Raheja Hospital, Mumbai, where she was also Head of the Department of Histopathology. She was a Consultant Histopathologist at the same institution. In addition, she was Dean of the Indian College of Pathologists and served as Vice President (Asia) of the International Academy of Pathology.

Borges also established the Centre for Oncopathology at Raheja Hospital, which became an important referral centre. Her expertise made her a sought-after diagnostician, with oncologists across India relying on her reports.

== Teaching and outreach ==
Borges lectured widely in smaller Indian cities, participated in national training programmes, and mentored numerous young pathologists. During the COVID pandemic, she along with Dr Sumeet Gujral started the Online Teaching Programme for Postgraduate students in Pathology with the support of Tata Trusts. It is a free teaching programme which runs twice a week online and covers the entire gamut of the Pathology curriculum. Expert pathologists from India and abroad conduct teaching sessions and slide seminars online which are attended from pathology students and practitioners from several countries.

== Death and legacy ==
Borges died in Gorakhpur, Uttar Pradesh, on 18 September 2025, after suffering a heart attack while attending a medical conference. She was 78.

Borges was remembered not only for her diagnostic expertise but also for extending training and mentorship beyond major centres to smaller cities across India. Her commitment to education and her role in developing oncopathology services made her one of the most respected figures in her field.

== Recognition ==
Borges’s professional style was often described as honest, ethical, and precise. She was widely referred to as the "Queen of Histopathology" in recognition of her role in shaping cancer pathology in India.

She received the Lifetime Achievement Award from the Indian Society of Head and Neck Oncologists.
