= Binaca (Indian brand) =

Indian oral hygiene brand

Binaca is an oral hygiene brand that is marketed in India and owned by Dabur.

== History ==
It was launched in 1951–52 as a toothpaste brand Binaca Top. It sponsored an extremely popular music show on Radio Ceylon and later on All India Radio, Binaca Geetmala which was hosted by noted radio personality Ameen Sayani. The brand was owned by Reckitt Benckiser who sold it to Dabur in 1996 for ₹1.2 crore (US$140,000).

== Post acquisition ==
Dabur initially launched a toothpowder under the Binaca brand but withdrew that within a year as sales volumes were low. Dabur appointed PricewaterhouseCoopers to sell the Binaca brand in 2002 and was looking at a valuation of approximately ₹20 crore (US$2.4 million). However, after it was unable to sell the brand at the price it expected, it announced that it would revive it by marketing a new herbal toothpaste under the Binaca brand. Currently, Dabur markets toothbrushes under the Binaca brand.

== See also ==
- List of toothpaste brands
- Index of oral health and dental articles
- Cibaca (brand)
- Binaca (breath spray)
