= Nuthakki Bhanu Prasad =

Indian engineer

- Born: 21 February 1928; Vijayawada, Andhra Pradesh, India
- Died: 29 April 2013 (aged 85); Hyderabad, India
- Occupations: Chemical engineer, bureaucrat, Industrialist
- Known for: Atomic energy
- Spouse: Pendyala Ananthalakshmi
- Children: Four sons
- Parent(s): Nutakki Ramaseshaiah; Punnamma
- Awards: Padma Shri; Petrotech Lifetime Achievement Award

Nuthakki Bhanu Prasad (1928-2013) was an Indian chemical engineer, bureaucrat and a former chairman of the Oil and Natural Gas Commission (ONGC). He is credited with the design of the first Magnesium Plant in India in 1994 and was involved with the commissioning of Apsara research reactor, the first Indian atomic reactor. The Government of India honoured him in 1960, with the award of Padma Shri, the fourth highest Indian civilian award for his services to the nation.

== Biography ==
Nuthakki Bhanu Prasad was born on 21 February 1928 in a Telugu-speaking family at Vijayawada, Andhra Pradesh to Punnamma and Nutakki Ramaseshaiah, a former Member of Parliament and Minister of Health at the Government of Odisha. He did his early education at Parvatipuram, Intermediate in S.K.C.G College Parlakhemundi and Visakhapatanam and obtained his graduate degree in mechanical engineering with honours from Madras University in 1947. Moving to Purdue University, he obtained a master's degree (MS) in chemical engineering. This was followed by advanced research at Case Institute of Technology (1953) and returned to India the same year to join Aluminium Company of Canada, Montreal at its Kolkata subsidiary to work for a year.

In 1954, he joined the Department of Atomic Energy as the Head of Reactor Group and worked there till 1961. During this period, he also served as the project manager of CIRUS reactor from 1958 to 1961 when he retired from DAE service. From 1962 to 1974, he was associated with various private sector companies such as AFM, SEL, OXEECO, PIPL in the capacities of a director or managing director. In 1974, he was appointed the chairman of the Oil and Natural Gas Commission, a position he held till 1978. From 1978 to 1980, he served as a government secretary in the Ministry of Power, followed by a stint at the World Bank as a consultant based in Washington DC till 1992. Simultaneously, he held the post of the chairman of Andhra Pradesh Industrial Infrastructure Corporation from 1986 to 1988 and later, served as a member of its board of governors. He also served as a board member of Electronics Corporation of India Limited (1965–79) and Indian Overseas Bank (1969-78).

Bhanu Prasad was married to Pendyala Ananthalakshmi and the couple had four sons. He died on 29 April 2013 in Hyderabad at the age of 85.

== Legacy and honours ==
Nuthakki Bhanu Prasad was associated with three major Indian ventures such as the first nuclear reactor in Trombay, the development of Bombay High oil fields and the first Indian magnesium plant. He is a recipient of Honoris Causa degrees of Doctor of Science from Jawaharlal Nehru Technological University, Hyderabad (1975) and Doctor of Philosophy from Andhra University (1978). He was an elected member of the Andhra Pradesh Academy of Sciences, a founder member of the Hyderabad Management Association and a former president of the Federation of Andhra Pradesh Chambers of Commerce and Industry (FAPCI) and the Institute of Public Enterprise. In 1960, the Government of India awarded him the civilian honour of Padma Shri. He received the Petrotech Lifetime Achievement Award in 2003.

== See also ==
- Nuclear power in India
- Oil and Natural Gas Commission
