= Maganbhai Ramchhodbhai Patel =

Maganbhai Ranchhodbhai Patel

Maganbhai Ranchhodbhai Patel
- Born: Gujarat, India
- Occupation: Bureaucrat
- Awards: Padma Shri

Maganbhai Ranchhodbhai Patel was an Indian bureaucrat, known for his contributions to the cooperative sector in India. He was also known for introducing reforms in the land sector for the benefit of the farmers. He was involved with many cooperative institutions and banks such as Sardargunj Mercantile Co-operative Bank and Kalupur Bank. He was honoured by the Government of India in 1967, with the award of Padma Shri, the fourth highest Indian civilian award for his contributions to the society.

== See also ==
- Cooperative
