= Binaca (breath spray) =

American brand of breath freshener

- Product type: Breath spray, dental floss
- Current owner: Ranir, LLC
- Country: United States
- Website: www.binaca.com

Binaca is an American brand of breath spray distributed by Ranir, LLC, a subsidiary of Perrigo. The sprays contain ethyl alcohol and isobutane, the latter used as a propellant.

== History ==
In 1971, Binaca promoted its breath freshener products by selling a recipe booklet titled The Antisocial Cookbook for $1, which contains 150 recipes "extolling the virtues of garlic, onions, cheese" and other ingredients known to cause breath odors; the reasoning for this was that Binaca's breath products would "make you socially acceptable" after eating such dishes.

In 1974, Binaca was estimated to be worth $5 million. That year, Air Wick was acquired by Ciba-Geigy, and Binaca was moved into Air Wick's consumer products unit. Playtex Products acquired the Binaca brand in 1998. Binaca was acquired by Dr Fresh LLC, an oral care products company based in Buena Park, CA in 2009. Dr Fresh LLC was acquired by Perrigo in 2020.

== Safety ==
In October 1993, articles in The Boston Globe and The Tribune reported that children and teenagers were supposedly inhaling Binaca in order to induce intoxication. The administration of Los Osos Middle School in Los Osos, California, prohibited students from possessing Binaca, citing safety concerns. Then-principal Greg Pruitt stated, "The kids were misusing it, spraying other kids and just horsing around. [...] Some years it's frogs and butterflies. One year it was Silly String. This year it was Binaca." Some stores and pharmacies in the Los Osos and Boston areas began storing Binaca products behind the counter and refusing to sell them to minors.
