= Avinash Veeraraghavan =

Visual artist

Avinash Veeraraghavan (born 1975) is an Indian artist who creates graphic books, layered prints, and multichannel video installations based on popular culture.

Veeraraghavan uses images from photographs, patterns in print and textiles, wallpaper patterns, wrapping paper. He has created images artwork using digital images that are layered and juxtaposed.

In 2011, Veeraraghavan's work was part of a two-person show titled Crazy Jane and Jack the Journeyman at Galerie Krinzinger in Vienna. His work was shown at the Prague Biennale in 2011 in a section titled, Crossroads: India Escalate.

In 2009, Veeraraghavan received the Illy Sustain Art prize at Arco, Madrid.

== Early life ==
Born in 1975 in Chennai, Tamil Nadu, Veeraraghavan did a post-school programme at the Centre for Learning in Bangalore under the guidance of Andrea Anastasio in 1995.

Veeraraghavan worked for Studio Sowden and Studio Fronzoni in Milan. He also studied book design at Tara Publishing under the guidance of Rathna Ramanathan in 2000.

== Work ==
=== I Love My India ===
In 2002, Veeraraghavan authored I Love My India. Stories for a City, published by Tara Publishing, Chennai and Dewi Lewi Publishing, London in 2004.

Using digital as well as manual cut-and-paste techniques, Veeraraghavan 'collected pictures from all over and reconstructed an imaginary, generic city'. The book is divided into three sections – Billboard City, Weak Architecture and Remote City, the book juxtaposes images without any evident hierarchy. I Love My India was printed on uncoated stock paper, with one commentator describing it as a bright pastiche of images born of everyday urban aesthetics.

I Love My India has been described as a visual journey through Indian cities from a non-western perspective. It celebrates billboards, street-life, kitsch and popular culture.

The material comes from city streets, construction sites, traffic, and film posters. It also references literary images, myths and signboards. According to one commentator, the book moves through the spaces and signs of the city – both imaginative and physical – commenting on the complex and often surreal forms of human arrangements.

In 2007, Veeraraghavan made a video using select spreads from the book for an exhibition, Urban Manners at Hangar Bicocca in Milan.

=== 2003–2005 ===
In 2003, Veeraraghavan produced a large format print on semi-gloss coated paper, titled "Osmosis". Manipulating the tonalities of black-and-white inkjet printing and through the interplay of details, he produced a jigsaw puzzle. One commentator described it as densely entangled figures of copulating nudes brought together to conjure up a 'paradise' of winged butterflies.

In 2004, Veeraraghvan created an untitled exhibition that played optical tricks on the viewers. The show was made to resemble a fair or playground. White cotton curtains created a labyrinth, while wires studded with coloured light bulbs dangled from the ceilings. The last installation was called "How Many Shadows Have You?", described as tremulous, multi-hued shadows of viewers on gallery walls. A series of seven photographic prints made from unexposed negatives also reflected passersby.

=== Homesick ===
In 2006, Veeraraghavan unveiled the solo exhibition Homesick at GallerySKE in Bangalore. Working with digital prints, designs and video installations in his show, Veeraraghavan, according to one reviewer, relied on the camera image to draw into focus the connection between direct viewing and the construction of reality.

According to one commentator, Veeraraghavan has relentlessly questioned objectivity in photography and has shown how the artist plays the role of a person who stimulates the subjective self-awareness of the spectator. In a two-channel video with sound, titled Home Sweet Home, Veeraraghavan created close-up of a watchful eye looking through a peep-hole projected across a video of a layered waterfall.

Homesick was also part of a two-person show at Project 88 in Mumbai. In addition to his homesick work, Veeraraghavan exhibite four prints Sorry, Wrong Number. In the four images on view the artist's torso appears to twist, bend or expand in the frame even as it is hemmed in by a multiplicity of images of apparently inconsequential detail. It was described as a close up of multiple perspectives of the everyday—the view of the unmade bed, table top, pile of clothes all accruing to a generic disorder.

=== Gate Crash ===
In 2008, Veeraraghavan exhibited his work Gate Crash at Krinzinger Projekte in Vienna.

In Gate Crash, Veeraraghavan created heavily collaged images. The prints consist of two layers each:

The first layer is images of the artist's old clothes and toys, and double exposed on top are appropriated images of dollhouses. According to one analysis, the dollhouses and toys reference an aspect of childhood that is at times childlike and at others childish. They also highlight a desire to live and function in a make believe world, one that imitates and duplicates the world outside but is in reality a private one.

A second opaque layer of clothes and toys on the surface, according to the analysis, prevents any further insight, annulling the illusion of depth carried by the photographs of the dollhouses. They are described as “psychic shimmers devoid of narrative, but derived from the images of the flotsam and jetsam of everyday lives.”

A video piece entitled Hurricane provides background laughter in combination with snippets of music by Johann Sebastian Bach.

=== Toy Story ===
In 2009, Veeraraghavan presented his solo exhibition Toy Story at GALLERYSKE, comprising prints, a video, objects and a little book cArt critic and curator, Marta Jakimowicz wrote,

“Avinash Veeraraghavan's new exhibition at Galleryske again brings a fascinating layering of images and sensations that ambiguously oscillate between reality and fantasy, childhood atmosphere and adult perception, between literal roughness and poetry, innocent beauty and morbidity, its many elements permeating and reflecting one another with some clash or merely gap and some complementary qualities.”

Veeraraghavan used cheap, plastic toys that are commonly found on the streets of India as a central reference. In addition to the ten photographic prints of staged sites of destruction using plastic toys that have been set up, there were also two object pieces

- a set of five tiny plastic toy suitcases containing different traces of the artist's body – fingernails, hair, coffee, anti-depressant pills and cigarette butts
- an unmade bed, with a pile of tiny cheap toys spilled over

Veeraraghavan also created a primarily graphic collection of collages in a book titled, amfastasleep.

=== Crazy Jane and Jack the Journeyman ===
In 2011, Veeraraghavan created the show Crazy Jane and Jack the Journeyman at Gallerie Krinzinger. He used media like wood inlay and embroidery with beads as well as digital prints and a video installation.

== Awards ==
In 2009, Veeraraghavan received the Illy Sustain Art prize presented by Illycaffe (in collaboration with ARCO Madrid) for his work The Deafening.

== Selected exhibitions ==
2011

- Crazy Jane and Jack the Journey Man, Galerie Krinzinger, Vienna

2010

- Indian Highway, Herning Museum of Contemporary Art, Denmark
- Urban Manners 2, curated by Adelina Von Furstenberg, Art for The World at SESC Pompeia, São Paulo, Brazil
- GALLERYSKE for Gallery BMB, BMB Gallery, Mumbai

2009

- Toy Story, GALLERYSKE, Bangalore (solo)
- Group show, Lawrence Eng Gallery, Vancouver
- Indian Highway, Astrup Fearnley Museum of Modern Art, Oslo
- For Life: The Language of Communication, Tilton Gallery, New York

2008

- Gate-Crash, Krinzinger Projekte, Vienna (solo)
- Still Moving Image, Curated by Deeksha Nath, Devi Art Foundation, New Delhi (cat)
- CURRENT, curated by Nivedita Magar at GALLERYSKE, Bangalore
- Post Visual World, curated by Gitanjali Dang, Priyasri Gallery, Mumbai

2007

- I Fear I Believe I Desire, curated by Gayatri Sinha, Gallery Espace, New Delhi
- Urban Manners, curated by Adelina von Furstenberg, Art for the World at Hangar Bicocca, Milan

2006

- Project 88, Mumbai
- Homesick, GALLERYSKE, Bangalore (solo)
- Around Architecture, Curated by Marta Jakimowich, Colab, Bangalore
- Watching me, Watching India, curated by Gayatri Sinha and Celina Lunsford, Fotografie Forum International and Kommunale Galerie, Frankfurt
- with Love, curated by GALLERYSKE and Tilton Gallery, at Miami Design District

2005

- Indian Summer, Curated by Henri Claude Cousseau, Deepak Ananth and Jany Lauga [Ecole de Beaux Arts, Paris]

2004

- Recent Work, GALLERYSKE, Bangalore (solo)
- Dispelling Asian Stereotypes, Public art project, Denmark

2003

- Sakshi Gallery, Bangalore (solo)
- CITY PARK, Curated by Suman Gopinath and Grant Watson, Project Arts Centre, Dublin

2001

- Portraits, Sakshi Gallery, Bangalore (solo)
