= Krishna Gopal Saxena =

Indian homoeopathic physician (1912–2003)

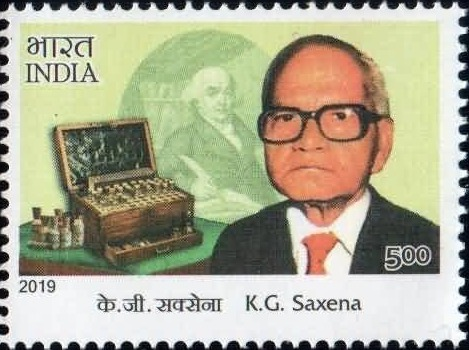
- Born: 25 September 1912; Delhi, British India
- Died: October 2003 (aged 91)
- Occupation: Homoeopathic physician
- Spouse: Shakuntala Devi
- Awards: Padma Shri; N. C. Chakravarty Memorial National award President of Honour award

Krishna Gopal Saxena (1912–2003) was an Indian homoeopathic physician. Born on 25 September 1912 in Delhi, he did his schooling at Karachi and Ambala and graduated in homoeopathic medicine from the Calcutta Homoeopathic Medical College.

Saxena was the first Honorary Advisor of the Homoeopathic Reference Committee, constituted by the Government of India in 1952 and served as the honorary physician to Dr. Rajendra Prasad, the first president of India. He held the chair of the Homoeopathic Advisory Committee of Government of Delhi from 1994 to 1999. A winner of N. C. Chakravarty Memorial National award and President of Honour award from the International Homoeopathy Congress, he was honoured by the Government of India in 1969, with the award of Padma Shri, the fourth highest Indian civilian award for his contributions to the society.

Saxena died in October 2003. His then-wife was Sakuntala Devi.

== See also ==
- Homoeopathy
