= Malathi Veeraraghavan =

Indian and American electrical engineer

Malathi Veeraraghavan (July 11, 1962 – May 11, 2020) was an Indian and American electrical engineer specializing in communications networks, including broadband networks, wireless ad hoc networks, vehicular ad hoc networks, and optical networking. She worked as a researcher for AT&T Bell Labs and as a professor at the University of Virginia.

== Life and work ==
Veeraraghavan was born on July 11, 1962, and earned a bachelor's degree in electrical engineering from IIT Madras in 1984. She went to Duke University for graduate study in electrical engineering, earning a master's degree in 1985 and completing her Ph.D. in 1988. Her dissertation, Modeling and Evaluation of Fault-Tolerant Multiple Processor Systems, was supervised by Kishor S. Trivedi.

She became a researcher and member of the technical staff of AT&T Bell Labs, starting in 1988 in Columbus, Ohio and moving in 1992 to Holmdel, New Jersey. Her work there involved the development of distributed call processing technology for voice over IP services. She was named a distinguished member of the technical staff in 1994.

In 1999 she returned to academia as an associate professor at Brooklyn Polytechnic (now part of New York University). She moved to the University of Virginia in 2003, as the founding director of a new graduate program in computer engineering, jointly offered by the departments of computer science and electrical and computer engineering. She was promoted to full professor in 2007.

She died on May 11, 2020.

== Recognition ==
Veeraraghavan was named an IEEE Fellow, in the 2020 class of fellows, "for contributions to control-plane architectures, signal protocols and hybrid networks".
