= Rahimtulla M. Sayani =

Indian politician (1847 –1902)

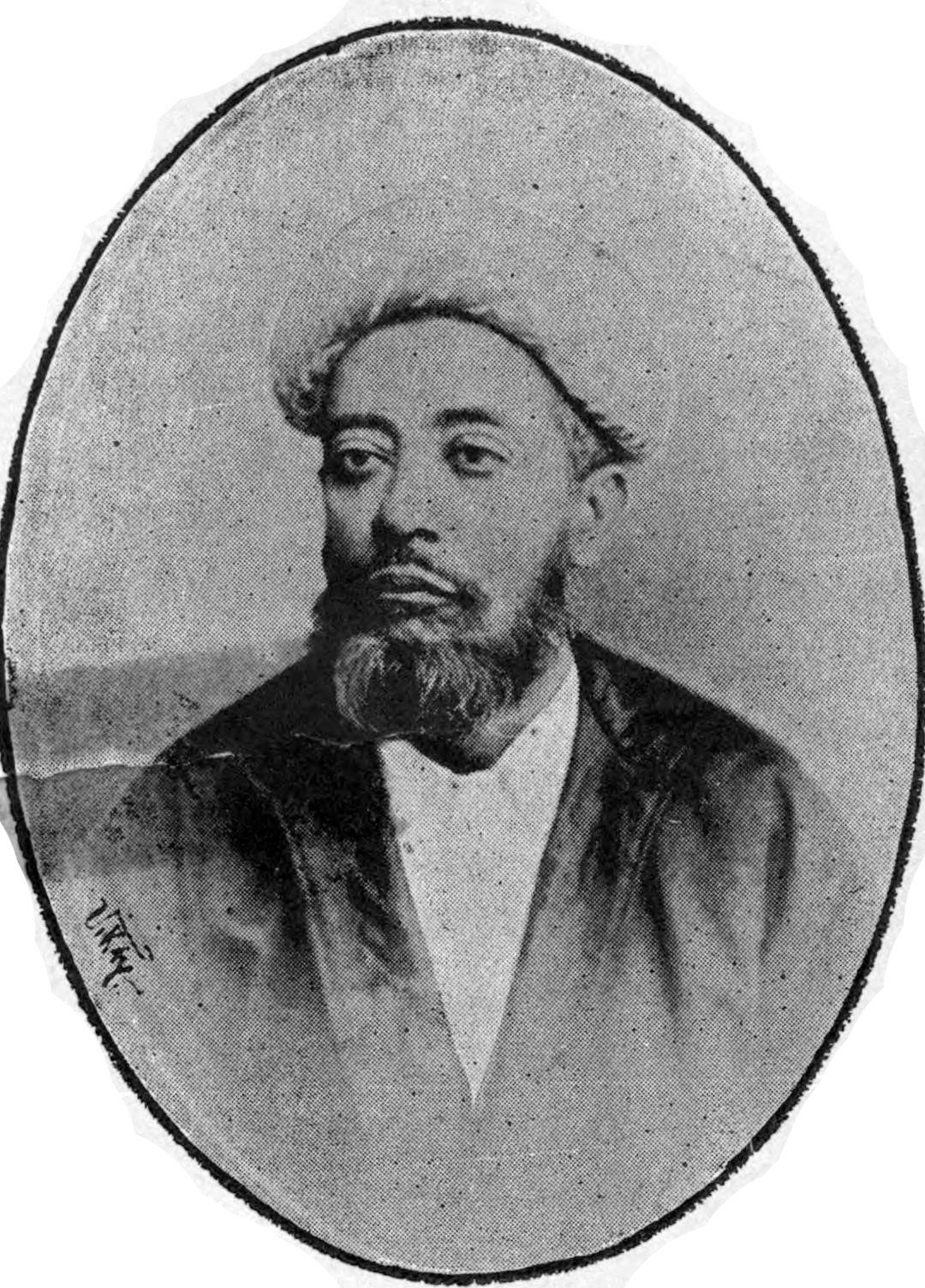

Rahimtulla Mahomed Sayani (5 April 1847 – 6 June 1902), was an Indian politician who served as the President of the Indian National Congress for a term in 1896, succeeding Surendranath Banerjea.

Rahimtullah M Sayani, born in 1847, belonged to the Khoja Muslim community, who were the disciples of the Aga Khan. Rahimtullah M Sayani was western educated, a Lawyer by profession who achieved public eminence and professional excellence, he was elected as a member of the Bombay Municipal Corporation and was the Sheriff of Bombay in 1885, also elected as President of the Corporation in 1888. He was elected twice to the Bombay Legislative Council and was also elected to the Imperial Legislative Council (1896–1898).

He was associated with the Indian National Congress since its inception and was one of the two Indian Muslims who attended its First Session of INC held at Bombay in 1885, where Womesh Chandra Bonnerjee was elected as the first President. In the year 1896 he presided over the 12th Annual Session of the Congress held at Calcutta and also the "Vande Mataram" was first sang 1896 at Calcutta. Rahimtullah M Sayani was the second Muslim to serve as president after Badruddin Tyabji. As Congress president, his address to the party was notable for its detailed look on the British rule's economic and financial aspects.

He was a member of the Congress Executive Committee (Indian Congress Committee) formed in 1899 as one of the representatives from Bombay.

He died at his residence in Bombay on 6 June 1902. His grandson, Ameen Sayani, became a prominent radio announcer in mid 20th-century India.
