= Mangru Ganu Uikey =

Indian politician (1901–1984)

Mangru Ganu Uikey (5 November 1901 – 5 May 1984) was an Indian politician and Social worker, who devoted his entire life working for the upliftment and welfare of tribal people. He served as a Member of Parliament in the 1st, 2nd, 3rd, 4th and 5th Lok Sabha of the Govt of India. He was awarded with the honour of "Padma Shri" in 1969 by the Government of India for his outstanding contribution in the field of social work.

== Early life and family ==
Mangru Ganu Uikey was born at Village Wadhona, then (Dist-. Chanda Fort, CP & Berar). He was the son of Shri Ganu Uikey. He spent his growing up years and completed his formal education at villages Wadhona and Bramhpuri (District Chanda).

He worked in Bengal Nagpur Railway from 1918 to 1943 as a Booking Clerk and Goods Clerk. He was married to Smt. Janakibai, and had three daughters and four sons. He later maintained his permanent residence at Nainpur, District. Mandla, Madhya Pradesh.

== Social work ==
Mangru Ganu Uikey was known to be the voice of the tribals, a determined social activist and an eminent political leader.

He served as the Secretary of (i) Akhil Gondwana Gond Mahasabha for ten years from 1934 to 1944 and (ii) Akhil Bharatiya Gond Mahasabha for sixteen years from 1934 to 1950.

He founded an Orphanage and several primary schools in Mandla and Chhindwara in 1944. He worked for economic upliftment of Adimjati in Balaghat in 1946 and started several primary schools and banks.

He organised a Tribal Summit & Fest – "Provincial Adimjati Mahasabha Vanjati Anandotsava" at Nainpur District. Mandla in 1950 and six sessions of Akhil Bhartiya Gond Mahasabha.

He was the Founder and Director of a monthly magazine - "Sachitra Adimjati Sevak".

== Political career ==
He belonged to Indian National Congress. In the 1951 election he was elected to the 1st Lok Sabha from the Mandla Lok Sabha constituency of Madhya Pradesh.

Member of Parliament - (i) First Lok Sabha, 1952-57 (ii) Second Lok Sabha, 1957–62, (iii) Third Lok Sabha, 1962–67, (iv) Fourth Lok Sabha, 1967-70 and (v) Fifth Lok Sabha, 1971–77.

Member – (i) Parliamentary Consultative Committee, Ministry of Home Affairs, 1952–67 and (ii) Estimates Committee, 1959–61.

== Administrative work ==
President, (i) South Eastern Railwaymen's Congress, Nainpur Branch since 1953, (ii) South Eastern Railway Ministerial Staff Association, Nainpur Branch since 1954;

Member, (i) Madhya Pradesh Tribal Advisory Council since 1950, (ii) All India Tribal Advisory Board and Scholarship Board, 1956–60, (iii) Adivasi Vikas Niti Nirdharan Ayog, M.P. State since 1968, (iv) Goodwill Team, Bastar, 1961, (v) Western Railway Zonal Consultative Committee, 1967, (vi) Food Situation Study Team, Bengal, (vii) Agricultural Labour Minimum Daily Wages Committee, Madhya Pradesh;

== Awards ==
Awards - Recipient of Award of "Padma Shri" in 1969.

== Publications ==
Publications - Report on the working of Akhil Gond Mahasabha from 1935 to 1945.
