= Breath spray =

Product sprayed into the mouth to cover up bad breath

Breath spray is a product sprayed into the mouth for the purpose of temporarily eliminating or at least covering up bad breath. The masking effect is short-term and reported to last for 4-6 hours. Breath sprays are occasionally advertised as being for smokers or those who dip tobacco, and occasionally to cover up the smell of cigarette/cigar smoking. Common flavours include cinnamon, spearmint and peppermint, as well as company-specific flavors, such as "Ice Mint", "Cool Mint" or "Supermint".

Some breath sprays are purported by their manufacturers to have antibacterial or anti-plaque properties, containing ingredients, such as chlorine dioxide, chlorhexidine, cetylpyridinium chloride, essential oils, hinokitiol, and zinc ions. As alcohol is frequently a prime ingredient of breath sprays, some brands advertise their products as alcohol-free. Alcohol is thought to be responsible for causing dry mouth when alcohol-containing breath sprays or mouthwashes are used too frequently. Some brands also advocate for using sugar-free formulations considering the disadvantageous consequences of sugar of causing caries.
