= Har Mander Singh =

Indian administrator, diplomat (1926-2020)

Chief Commissioner, Andaman and Nicobar Islands
- In office 1972–1975
- Preceded by: H. S. Butalia
- Succeeded by: Surendra Mohan Krishnatry

Commissioner, North-East Frontier Agency
- In office 1971–1972

Director, Ministry of External Affairs
- In office 1968–1971

Personal details
- Born: 26 June 1926 Dar-es-Salaam, Tanzania
- Died: 2020 (aged 93–94)
- Children: Harsh Mander
- Awards: Padma Shri; 1960

Har Mander Singh (1926–2020) was an Indian administrator, diplomat, and a recipient of the Padma Shri in 1960. He played a pivotal role in the Dalai Lama’s safe passage into India in 1959 and served in various key positions in governance.

== Early life ==
Har Mander Singh was born on 26 June 1926, in Dar-es-Salaam, Tanzania, to Piara Singh.

== Career ==
=== Early career ===
Singh began his professional journey as a commissioned officer in the Indian Army (1946–1953). He later transitioned to the Indian Frontier Administrative Service (IFAS), where he held significant postings:

- Assistant Political Officer, North-East Frontier Agency (1954–1956)
- Additional Political Officer, Nagaland (1956)
- Secretary, Supply and Transport, North-East Frontier Agency (1956–1957)
- Political Officer, Kameng District (1957–1960)

=== Role in the Dalai Lama's escape to India ===
In 1959, the 14th Dalai Lama fled Tibet after a failed uprising against Chinese rule. Har Mander Singh played a key role in coordinating the Dalai Lama's safe passage into India. Singh escorted the Tibetan spiritual leader from the Chutangnu border crossing, through treacherous terrain and remote villages, including Gorhsam, Shakti, Lumla, Thongleng, Tawang, Jang, Senge Dzong, Dirang, Rahung, and Bomdila, ultimately reaching Tezpur, Assam. For this exceptional service, Singh was awarded the Padma Shri in 1960. His detailed diary entries on the operation were later compiled in the book An Officer and His Holiness by his niece, Rani Singh. The book includes interviews with the Dalai Lama, his brother Tenzin Choegyal, and others involved in the event.

=== Subsequent roles ===
Singh held several prominent roles:

- Deputy Secretary, Ministry of External Affairs and Prime Minister’s Secretariat (1960–1965)
- Financial Adviser, Office of the Political Officer for Sikkim and Bhutan (1965–1967)
- Counsellor, Ministry of External Affairs (1967–1968)
- Director, Ministry of External Affairs (1968–1971)
- Commissioner, North-East Frontier Agency (1971–1972)
- Chief Commissioner, Andaman and Nicobar Islands (1972–1975) - During this tenure, he initiated efforts to promote tourism and oversaw the first official contact with the Jarawas. He also facilitated the settlement of Nicobarese in Little Andaman, creating a new habitat for migrating Nicobarese families in an area later named Harmander Bay in his honour.
- Director of the Regional Office for Asia and the Pacific under International Social Security Association (March 1985 to December 1995)

== Personal life ==
Har Mander Singh was married to Narinder Kaur, and the couple had two sons and one daughter. His son, Harsh Mander, is a noted author and civil rights activist. In 2017, at age 91, he co-signed an open letter with 64 other retired senior officials, advocating for the preservation of democratic values and governance in India.

== Death ==
Har Mander Singh died in 2020.
