= Tarapada Basu =

- Born: India
- Occupation: Journalist
- Known for: India Weekly
- Awards: Padma Shri

Tarapada Basu is an Indian journalist and a former president of the Indian Journalists Association of London. Basu, formerly with the now defunct Hindustan Standard of the Ananda Bazaar Patrika Group of Kolkata, founded the India Weekly from London in the 60s, operating out of the attic of his London office with two staff. He was honoured by the Government of India in 1969, with the Padma Shri, the fourth highest Indian civilian award.

== See also ==
- Hindustan Standard
- ABP Group
