= P. K. Banerjee (diplomat) =

Indian diplomat

Chargé d'affaires to China
- In office 1962–1962
- Prime Minister: Jawaharlal Nehru
- Preceded by: Ratan Kumar Nehru
- Succeeded by: Jagat Singh Mehta

Indian High Commissioner to Kenya
- In office 1964–1966
- Preceded by: Prem Krishen
- Succeeded by: es:Prem Narain Bhatia

1st Indian ambassador to Costa Rica
- In office 1968–1969
- Prime Minister: Indira Gandhi
- Succeeded by: Vishnu Kalyandas Ahuja

Indian ambassador to Thailand
- In office 1969–1971
- Preceded by: K. R. Narayanan
- Succeeded by: Romesh Bhandari

6th Indian permanent representative to the United Nations Office at Geneva
- In office August 1971 – August 1973
- Prime Minister: Indira Gandhi
- Preceded by: Natarajan Krishnan
- Succeeded by: Brajesh Mishra

Personal details
- Born: 7 December 1917 Kolkata, India
- Died: 2003 (aged 85–86)

Purnendu Kumar Banerjee (7 December 1917 – 2003) was Indian Chargé d'affaires in Beijing during the India-China border conflict, also called the Sino-Indian War. He wrote a short book on his encounters with Zhou En Lai (1898–1976). Banerjee was a recipient of the 1963 Padma Shri award, India's fourth highest civilian award. In 1969, he became India's first ambassador to Costa Rica. He was the sixth Ambassador in the Permanent Mission of India to the UN Office in Geneva.

== Selected publications ==
- Banerjee, Purnendu Kumar (1990). My Peking memoirs of the Chinese invasion of India. New Delhi: Clarion Books.
- Banerjee, Purnendu Kumar (2002). Assignment Americas: perspective of a partnership in values. Kolkata: Bibhasa.
