= Sonam Narboo =

Indian engineer, administrator, and politician from Ladakh

- བསོད་ནམས་ནོར་བུ

India Ambassador to Mongolian People's Republic
- In office February 1971 – February 1975
- Preceded by: Incumbent
- Succeeded by: Yudhishtar Raj Dhawan

Personal details
- Born: 27 May 1909 Skara
- Died: 2 February 1980 (aged 70)
- Education: University of Punjab, University of Sheffield
- Occupation: engineer, politician
- Awards: Padma Shri; 1961

Sonam Narboo, also known as Sonam Norbu (Tibetan: བསོད་ནམས་ནོར་བུ), was an Indian engineer, administrator, and politician from Ladakh who played a pivotal role in the region's development. In recognition of his contributions, he was honoured with the Padma Shri in 1961.

== Early life ==
Sonam Narboo was born on 27 May 1909, in Skara, a village near Leh, into a middle-class Buddhist family known as Nyachu. His parents were farmers, and Narboo was the eldest of five siblings. He completed his early education at the University of Punjab and pursued higher studies in England, earning a degree in civil engineering from the University of Sheffield in the 1930s.

Narboo is remembered for his engineering contributions during the Kashmir conflict of 1947–1948, particularly his role in constructing the Kushok Bakula Rimpochee Airport (Leh Airfield) in 1948. Under challenging conditions, with limited resources and no modern equipment, Narboo led the construction of the airstrip at one of the highest altitudes in the world. The project was completed in just three weeks and proved crucial in securing Ladakh during the tribal invasions supported by Pakistan. This achievement earned him national recognition and the Padma Shri in 1961.

In February 1971, Narboo was appointed as India’s first ambassador to the Mongolian People's Republic. His tenure as ambassador lasted until February 1975. Upon returning to India, he was inducted into Sheikh Mohammad Abdullah’s cabinet in 1975 as Minister of Works & Power and Minister of Ladakh Affairs. During his time in office, Narboo managed infrastructure projects in Ladakh, overseeing portfolios that accounted for over 70% of the state budget. His tenure saw Ladakh being opened to international tourism and the establishment of air connectivity in 1977.

Sonam Narboo died on 2 February 1980. The Sonam Norbu Memorial Hospital, completed in 1980 and serving as the primary healthcare institution in Leh, is named in his honour.
