= Kalyan Singh Gupta =

Indian independence activist and social worker

- Born: 1923; Haryana, India
- Died: 23 January 2002 (aged 78–79); New Delhi, India
- Occupations: Social worker, independence activist
- Awards: Padma Shri

Kalyan Singh Gupta (1923–2002) was an Indian independence activist and social worker. He was the co-founder of the Lok Kalyan Samiti, a non-governmental organization based in the National Capital Region, together with Sucheta Kripalani in 1952.

Born in 1923 in the Indian state of Haryana, he completed his early college education in Punjab and Delhi, during which time he took part in the Indian independence movement, and later joined the London School of Economics to secure a master's degree, studying under the tutelage of Harold Laski. Returning to India in 1951, he started his career as a journalist at the India News Chronicle. A year later, he founded Lok Kalyan Samiti, along with Sucheta Kripalani. He also started the Central Relief Committee (CRC India) in 1959 for providing relief aid to the Tibetan refugees. He was honoured by the Government of India in 1969 with the award of Padma Shri, the fourth highest Indian civilian award.

Kalyan Singh Gupta died on 23 January 2002 in New Delhi at the age of 79.
