= Paramananda Acharya =

Indian Archaeologist

- Born: 1893; Baidyapur, British India
- Died: 11 April 1971 (aged 77–78); Baripada, Mayurbhanj, Odisha, India
- Occupation: Archaeologist
- Years active: 1924–1971
- Known for: Research on the history of Odisha
- Awards: Padma Shri

Pramananda Acharya (1893–1971) was an Indian archaeologist known for his notable archaeological research on the history of Odisha. He was honoured by the Government of India in 1964, with the award of Padma Shri, the fourth highest Indian civilian award for his services to the nation.

== Biography ==
=== Early years ===
Paramananda Acharya was born in 1893 at Baidyapur village in the Indian state of Odisha and completed his early schooling at Amarda ME School and Baripada High School to graduate in botany from Kolkata University in 1923 with honours. Though joined for his master's degree course, he abandoned studies on advice from Maharaja Purna Chandra Bhanjadeo, the erstwhile Maharaja of Mayurbhanj state and became a part of the team of renowned archaeologist, Rai Bahadur Ramaprasad Chanda in 1924. He had no formal training in archaeology, but Acaharya was invited to join the department of archaeology when Mayurbhanj state established the department in 1925 and he started his government service as an archaeological scholar.

=== Career ===
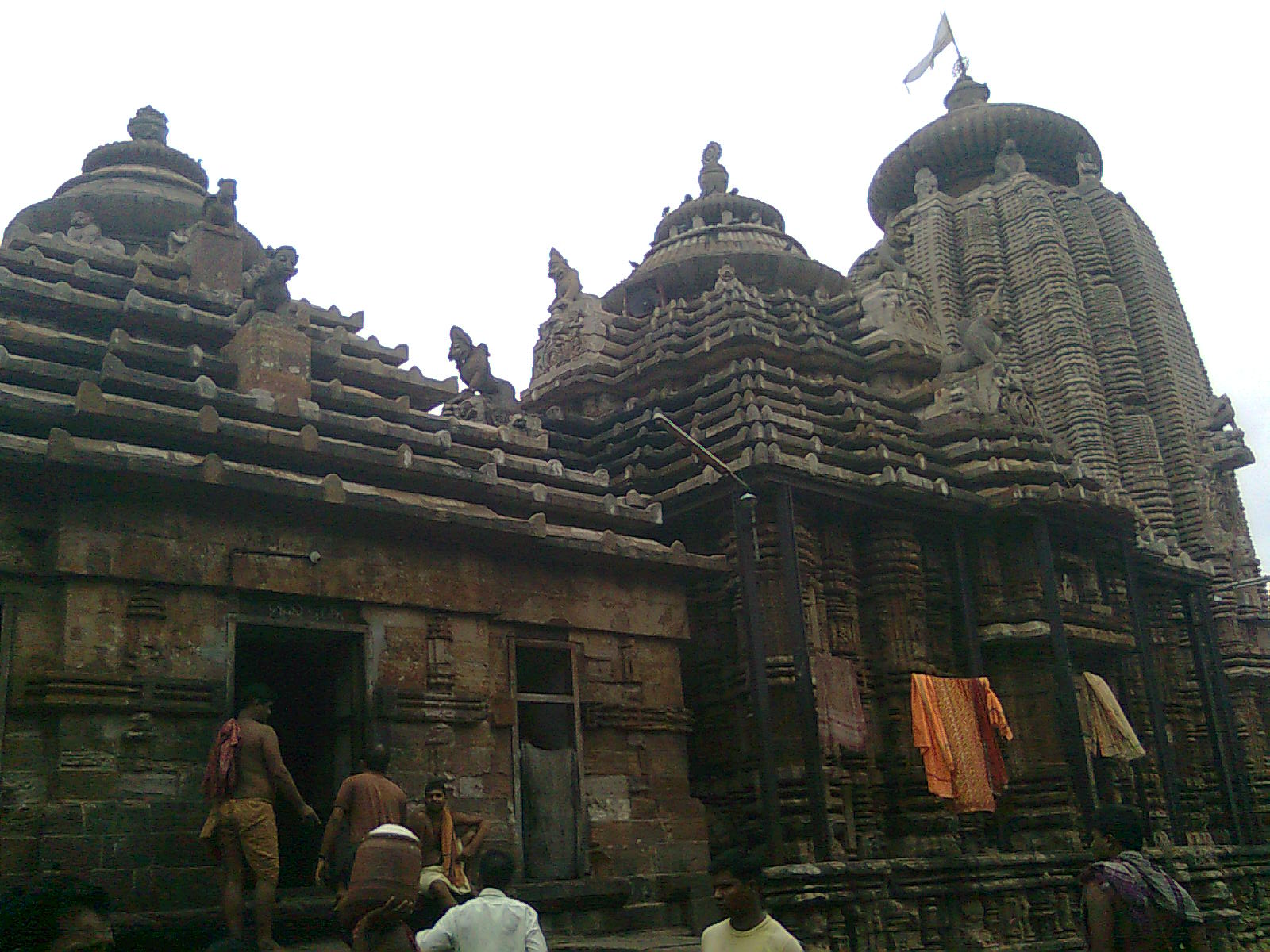
Ananta Vasudeva Temple

His initial posting was at Khiching with the responsibility of preserving the temples and historical sites in the area. In 1925, he underwent advanced training at Paharpur excavation site (presently in Bangladesh). During the next few years, he visited the neighbouring cities and states but returned to Khiching and started collecting sculptures, artifacts and antiquities from the medieval period. These finds were stored in Khiching temple premises which later became the Khiching Museum in 1928 and Acharya was appointed as the Senior Archaeologist of the museum. In 1930, when the Maharaja ordered the excavation of the Old Palace site in Hariharpur, Acharya was given the responsibility. During this project, he arranged for the dismantling of the dilapidated temples of Chandra Sekhar and Kutei-Tundi situated at the Palace site and restored them. He also restored the temple of Hara during this period.

Acharya participated in the first International Congress of the Anthropological and Ethnological Sciences, in 1934 and the trip to London helped him to gather copies of records related to Mayurbhanj and Ananta Vasudeva Temple of Bhubaneswar. A plaster copy of one of the inscriptions he brought is on display at the Odisha State Museum. In 1939, an expedition led by Acharya and E. C. Worman (Jr.) of Harvard University discovered Kuliana site near Mayurbhanj. Three years later, he was deputed to Khandapada, Banesvaranasi, Champesvar, Bhattarika, Simhanath and Ramchandi which resulted in the discovery of a temple at Ramchandi with a unique style of architecture. It was during this period, he undertook the reconstruction of Khichingesvari temple which was completed in 1942. Later, he discovered the Anantasayi Vishnu image at Saranga and Bhimkund. He also conducted surveys of archaeological relics at Vaitarani, Brahmani, and Mahanadi valleys.

=== Post Independence period ===
After the princely state of Mayurbhanj was assimilated into the state of Odisha under the Indian Union in 1949, Acharya became the superintendent of archaeology, museum and research of the state government with office at the Ravenshaw College premises in Cuttack. He was also given additional responsibility to attend to duties related to the state education department. During his tenure as its head, the department is reported to have developed into the present day Odisha State Museum. His efforts were reported in bringing many renowned archaeologists such as Kedar Nath Mahapatra and Satya Narayan Rajguru, Krushna Chandra Panigrahi and Susil Chandra De together under the banner of the museum.

=== Later years and legacy ===
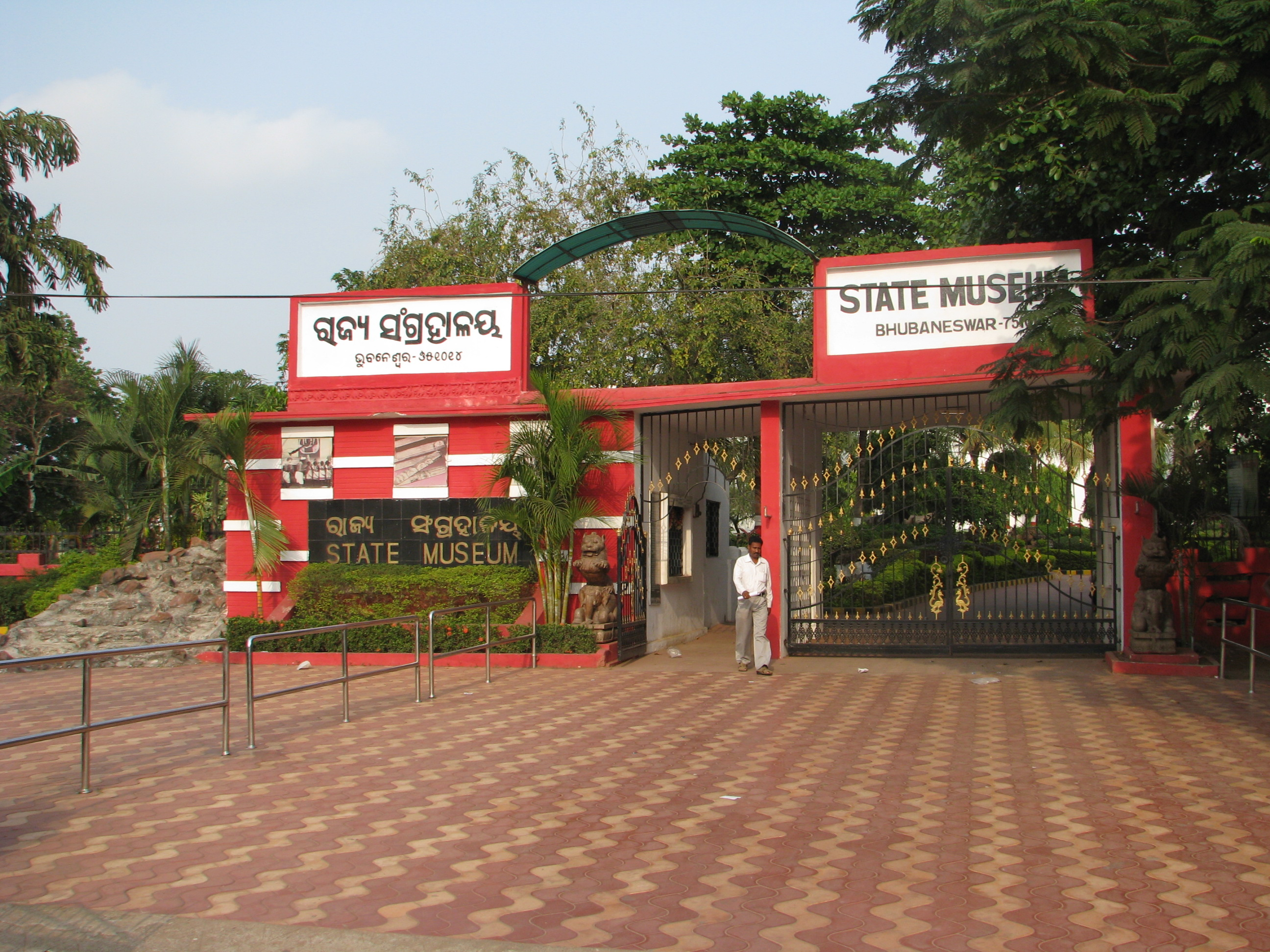
Odisha State Museum

After his retirement from government service in 1950, Acharya was given the special responsibility as the superintendent of the Odisha State Museum, and he served in that position till 1954. After a gap of one year, he took up work again in 1955, this time as the superintendent of archaeology, holding the post till 1962. Two years later, the Government of India honoured him with the civilian award of Padma Shri in 1964.

Acharya is the author of several articles and two books, Essays in History, Culture, Archaeology of Odisha, and Studies in Orissan History, Archaeology and Archives His writings are prescribed as reference books for graduate and post graduate studies at Ravenshaw University in Odisha. A commemorative volume, Life and culture in Orissa was published in 1984, compiling several of Acharya's writings.

Paramanand Acharya died on 11 April 1971, at his residence in Baripada, at the age of 78.

== See also ==
- Ramaprasad Chanda
- Odisha State Museum
- Ananta Vasudeva Temple
- Krushna Chandra Panigrahi
