= Natteri Veeraraghavan =

Indian microbiologist (1913–2004)

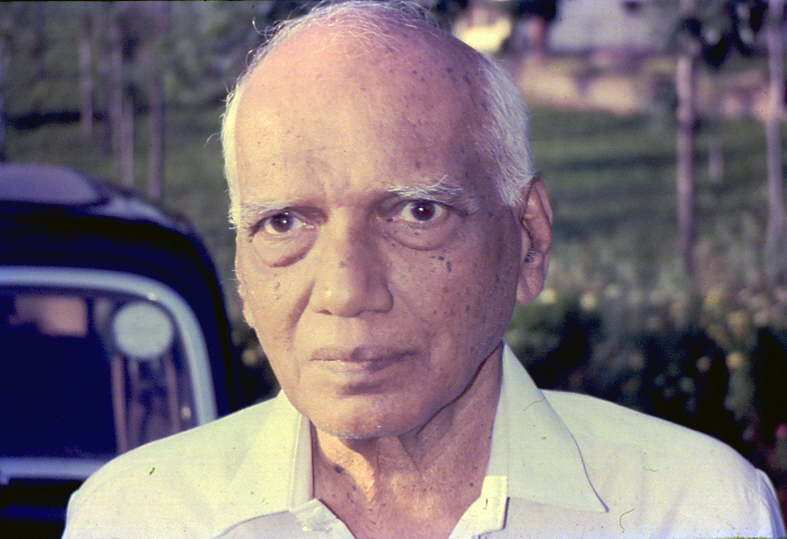
- Born: 1 November 1913; India
- Died: 6 August 2004 (aged 90)
- Occupations: Microbiologist, physician
- Known for: Microbiology
- Spouse: Kamala Veeraraghavan
- Parent(s): Natteri Venkatesa Iyer; Balambal
- Awards: Padma Shri; Societe Anonyme Poonawalla Memorial Award

Natteri Veeraraghavan (1913–2004) was an Indian physician, microbiologist and medical researcher, known for his contributions to the understanding of diseases like rabies, tuberculosis and leprosy. He was a former director of the Pasteur Institute of India, Coonoor and the chairman of the World Health Organization International Reference Center on Rabies. He was honoured by the Government of India in 1967, with the award of Padma Shri, the fourth highest Indian civilian award for his contributions to the society.

== Biography ==
Natteri Veeraraghavan was born in Parangipettai, in Chennai district in the south Indian state of Tamil Nadu on 1 November 1913 to Natteri Venkatesa Iyer and Balambal. His graduated in medicine (MBBChir) from Andhra University in 1936 and did his senior internship at the Government Mental Hospital, Chennai in 1937. His career started as a research officer at the Pasteur Institute of India at Coonoor in 1937 and became the assistant director of the institute in 1941. While working in that position, he secured a doctoral degree (DSc) in microbiology from Andhra University in 1944.

In 1947, Veeraraghavan was made the director of the institute, a post he held till his retirement in 1972. Post retirement, he served as the director of the Vector Control Research Center, Pondicherry, from 1975 to 1977 and as the director of the Voluntary Health Services Medical Centre from 1977. He was a member of the Indian Council of Medical Research from 1945 to 1981 and sat on the Expert Panel of the World Health Organization on Rabies in 1953, 1956, 1959, 1965 and 1972. He was the vice chairman of the panel in 1953 and the chairman in 1959. He also served as a member of the Indian chapter of the World Health Organization Influenza Center from 1959 to 1972 and the Armed Forces Research Committee from 1967 to 1972.

One of the founding members of the Indian Academy of Medical Sciences, (present day National Academy of Medical Sciences), Veeraraghavan was known to have involved in extensive research in microbiology. He held many patents for his research and his research findings have been documented by way of several publications. Some of his notable publications are:

- Studies on Leprosy
- Studies on Leprosy: Supplement 3
- In Vitro Cultivation of M. Leprae: An Improved Medium
- Fluorescent antibody staining of rabies virus antigens using lissamine rhodamine B200 as fluorochrome
- The value of 5% semple vaccine in human treatment : comparative mortality among the treated and untreated
- A rapid method for cultivation of M. tuberculosis : an improved medium

Veeraraghavan, a recipient of the Societe Anonyme Poonawalla Memorial Award, was honoured by the Government of India with the civilian award of Padma Shri in 1967. He died at the age of 90 on 6 August 2004, survived by his wife, Kamala, daughter Shantha, and sons, Dr. N.V. Chandran and Dr. Mani Veeraraghavan.
