= Guduru Venkatachalam =

Indian agronomist (1909–1967)

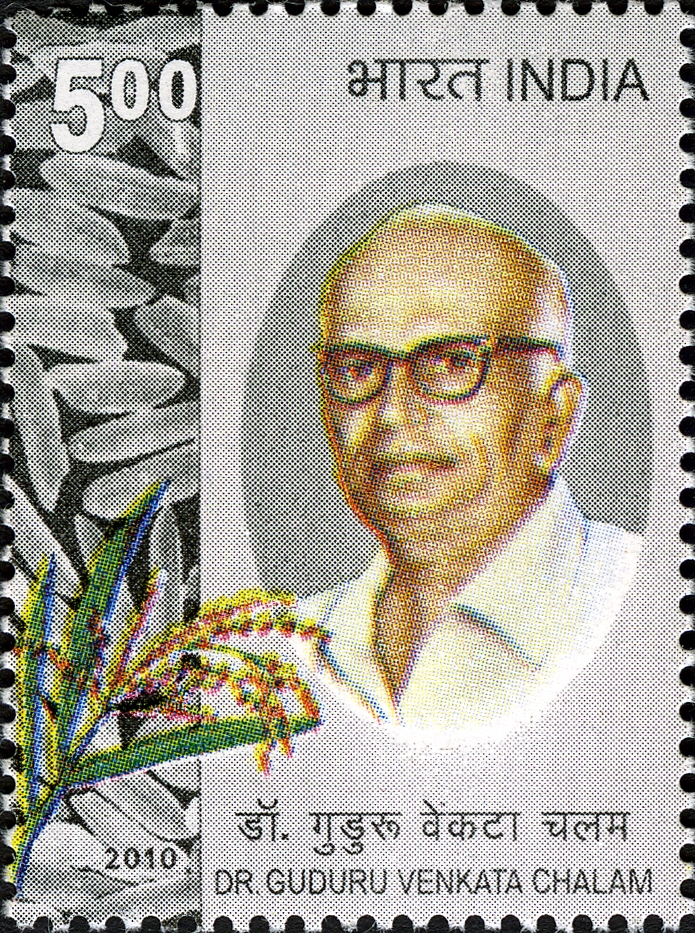
Guduru Venkatachalam on a 2010 stamp of India

G. V. Chalam, also known as Guduru Venkata Chalam (1909–1967), was an Indian activist and agricultural scientist who received the Padma Shri in 1967.

== Early years ==
Guduru Venkatachalam (a.k.a. G.V. Chalam) was born to an affluent family in 1909 in Gudivada, a town in the heart of Andhra Pradesh, India. At the time of his father's death, G.V. Chalam was only eight years old. He was brought up by his paternal uncle, Guduru Ramachandra Rao – a Gandhian and a pioneer social reformer who convened the first Adi Andhra Mahajana Sabha in 1917 for the emancipation of the so-called 'untouchable' castes, Malas and Madigas of Andhra Pradesh (now known as Dalits).

G V Chalam had his early education in Gudivada and Rajamundry and later continued his undergraduate studies P.R. Raja College in Kakinada.

Inspired by his uncle, G V Chalam soon became involved in contemporary social reforms and became a leading member of a Society (known as Sodara ‘Samajam’) which had as its goal the establishment of an egalitarian society transcending caste, creed, and religion. G.V. Chalam was fired by patriotic zeal and threw himself into national struggle for freedom from British colonial rule. As a graduate student, Chalam was caught distributing seditious ‘anti British’ literature by the police and was imprisoned for 14 months in the Vellore jail, in then Madras province, India.

== Education ==
Chalam continued his postgraduate education at the Banaras Hindu University (BHU) and was awarded a first class master's degree in botany. Following a short stint at the newly formed Indian Agricultural Research Institute (IARI), Chalam joined the Agriculture Department, Orissa Government as a research assistant in the Central Rice Research Institute, Cuttack. As a research assistant, Chalam carried out special work on the taxonomy of the rice and obtained his doctorate from the Patna University in 1943 (the first PhD degree on Anatomy of Rice in Agricultural Botany in the states of Bihar and Orissa). As a rice researcher, Chalam was responsible for evolving a number of important varieties of rice which became a household name in Orissa, like T-1145, T-141 and T-1242. He evolved a saline resistant variety of rice, SR 26B which now occupies the entire East Coast and parts of West Coast of India, Ceylon and some South-East Asian Countries.

In his capacity as Assistant Director of Director of Agriculture for Land Reclamation and Seed Multiplication, he established two very large sized farms after reclaiming the forest areas. The two farms are now known as the Sukinda farm and Deras farm contributed nearly 50 percent of the total seed production in Orissa in 1967. In 1954, as the Paddy Specialist of Orissa Government, Chalam participated in Food and Agriculture Organization Hybridization Scheme and commenced research work of the Japonica Indica hybrids. As a result of his untiring efforts, several promising hybrids came into being and a comprehensive monograph called 'Rice in Orissa' was published by the Orissa Government which was presented to the International Rice Commission. At a time when the raising of a second crop was unknown to the farmers, through his inventiveness, Chalam introduced several new crop varieties and popularised the raising of second crop in the command area of the newly created Hirakud Dam.

== Agricultural Revolution ==
In November 1960, Chalam was head hunted to join the Ministry of Food and Agriculture in the Union Government as the Deputy Agricultural Commissioner. In this capacity, he organised several seed production and training programmes in the country in collaboration with the Rockefeller and Ford Foundations. Chalam was one of the main draftsmen of the Seed Law for India which came to be known National Seed Act (1966). In 1963, Chalam was appointed as the first general manager of the National Seeds Corporation and established the first ever chain of Breeder-Foundation—Certified seed farms in India to produce high quality seeds to the farmers. This was the beginning of the certified seed programme which was to play a key role in ushering the Green Revolution in India in the late 60s. Dr. Chalam was the first Member-Secretary of the Central Variety Release Committee which is the forerunner of the Statutory Central Seed Committee.

After the expiry of his term as the general manager of the National Seeds Corporation, Chalam was appointed to the Indian Council of Agricultural Research (ICAR) in 1964. On his way back from attending an International Seed Testing Seminar in New Zealand, Chalam visited the International Rice Research Institute at Manila of his own initiative and expense and selected the Taichung Native-I (TN-1) as one of the most promising Indica varieties that could thrive in India. Chalam could get only one kilogram of seed of this variety and with the approval of the ICAR, he carried out trials at four places which gave outstanding results beyond all expectations. This brought new vistas in rice production in India. Despite criticism by many Indian agricultural scientists and scepticism of United Nations agencies and the World Bank officials regarding the characteristics of the variety and the ability of the Indian farmers to embrace new cultivation techniques, Chalam was undeterred and carried out trials of TN-1 in many small farms, mainly in the states of Orissa, Andhra Pradesh, West Bengal, Western Uttar Pradesh, Haryana and Punjab.

TN-1 proved to be an outstanding variety. At a time, when yields of 6000 to 7,000 lb (3,200 kg). per acre were a rare occurrence, with TN-1 it became a common occurrence in India. As one who introduced this high yielding variety in the country, Chalam successfully sponsored the release of TN-1 before the statutory Central Variety Release Committee in January 1966. Later he carried on an intensive seed production programme of TN-I in about 11,000 acres (45 km^{2}) in the second crop season of 1965–68 and made it possible to supply the seed for planting one million acres (4,000 km^{2}) for 'Kharif' (crop season during June–December) in 1966. Thus, beginning with one kilogram of seed of TN-I, Chalam built up a huge stock of certified seed for one million acres (4,000 km^{2}) which, even though considered as an impossible venture at one time, had become a practical achievement.

Unfortunately 1965 was the year when India was affected by very severe drought conditions. Large-scale food shortages were imminent. Prime Minister Lal Bahadur Shastri coined the slogan Jai Jawan Jai Kisan to encourage the farmers to produce more and at the same time called upon the countrymen to miss one meal every week to conserve the dwindling food supplies.

At a time when there was widespread despair amongst the farming community, Chalam persuaded the farmers to cultivate drought resistant TN-1 and staved off what certainly would have been another catastrophic famine in India.

Dr. Chalam rejoined the National Seeds Corporation as its managing director. Although Chalam became well known for the propagation of TN-1 rice, Chalam also played a key role in facilitating the introduction and popularisation of high yielding 'Mexican' dwarf wheat varieties and hybrid maize and groundnut varieties into India. During his stewardship, the National Seeds Corporation of India became a model public sector undertaking both for achieving financial results and for achievement of long-term social objectives. In recognition of this enduring contribution to agricultural development of the country, Dr Chalam was awarded Padma Shri in April 1967 by the Government of India.

Unfortunately a month later, on 8 May 1967, Dr G V Chalam suddenly died following a heart attack leaving behind a wife and eight children.

The Government of India released a commemorative stamp on 8 May 2010.

== Writing ==
Chalam was fluent in Telugu, English and Oriya. During his imprisonment as a student, Chalam wrote a collection of short stories about life in prison, some of which were later published in the Telugu magazine Krishna Patrika.

== See also ==
Rice production in India

== Books by Guduru Venkatachalam ==
- Introduction to Agricultural Botany in India GV Chalam and J Venkateswarlu. Asia Publishing House. 1966
- Soil Management in India HR Arakeri, GV Chalam, P Satyanarayana and Roy L Donohue. Asia Publishing House Bombay. 1959.
- Seed Testing Manual G V Chalam, A Singh, JE Douglas. Indian Council of Agricultural Research and United States Agency for International Development
