= Cibaca (brand) =

Indian oral hygiene brand

Cibaca is an oral hygiene brand in India. Originally owned by Ciba Geigy which marketed Cibaca toothpastes and toothbrushes, the brand was bought by Colgate-Palmolive in 1994. After the acquisition, Colgate relaunched the brand as Colgate Cibaca to indicate the change of ownership. The brand is strong in rural India, where it sells in high volumes.

== See also ==
- List of toothpaste brands
- Index of oral health and dental articles
- Binaca (brand)
