= Nutakki Ramaseshaiah =

Indian lawyer and politician

Member of Parliament
- Succeeded by: Dippala Suri Dora
- Constituency: Parvathipuram

Personal details
- Born: 29 September 1897 Chiluvuru, Guntur district, Madras Presidency, British India
- Died: June 1, 1969 (aged 71)
- Spouse: Punnamma
- Children: 2; 2 sons and 2 daughters

N. Ramaseshaiah or Nutakki Ramaseshaiah (29 September 1897 – 1 June 1969) was an Indian lawyer, politician and Member of Parliament.

== Early life and education ==
Ramaseshaiah was born to Shri Nutakki Uddande Ramaiah at Chiluvuru, Guntur district on 29 September 1897. He was educated at Presidency College and Madras Law College, Madras. Ramaseshaiah married Shrimati N. Punnamma on 14 May 1924. They had two sons and two daughters.

== Career in law and politics ==
Ramaseshaiah has practiced Law in Vijayawada. He worked as assistant Diwan and later as Diwan in Jaipur Samsthanam and was closely associated with Velagapudi Ramakrishna. In 1952, he was elected to 1st Lok Sabha from Parvathipuram (Lok Sabha constituency) as an Independent candidate.

He was elected to the Jaipur Assembly constituency in Orissa as a member of Swatantra Party and held the position of Minister of Health for the Government of Orissa. In 1962, he contested the 3rd Lok Sabha from Nowrangapur constituency and lost.

== Later life ==
Vedula Satyanarayana Sastry dedicated his Deepavali Khandakavyam to him. He died on 1 June 1969.
