= Binaca Geetmala =

Weekly countdown-show of top songs from Hindi films

Binaca Geetmala (transl. Binaca Necklace of Songs) was a weekly countdown show of top filmi songs from Hindi cinema. It was broadcast on Radio Ceylon from 1952 to 1988 and then shifted to the Vividh Bharati Service of All India Radio network in 1989 where it ran until 1994. It was the first radio countdown show of Indian film songs, and has been quoted as being the most popular radio programme in India during its run. Its name reflects its sponsorship by oral hygiene brand Binaca. Binaca Geetmala, and its subsequent incarnations named after Cibaca—Cibaca Sangeetmala, Cibaca Geetmala, and Colgate Cibaca Sangeetmala—ran from 1954 to 1994 on Radio Ceylon and then on Vividh Bharati. They also broadcast annual year-end lists from 1954 to 1993.

== Annual List by Year ==
- 1977

== Most No of songs by singer ==
Singer	Number of songs	Years
Lata Mangeshkar	19	1953, 1957, 1963, 1967, 1968, 1969, 1970, 1975, 1976, 1977, 1980, 1982, 1983 1985, 1986, 1990, 1994, 1995, 2000
Mohammed Rafi	8	1956, 1957, 1960, 1961, 1962, 1963, 1966, 1980
Kishore Kumar	6	1959, 1971, 1974, 1979, 1982, 1983
Mukesh	6	1955, 1964, 1965, 1967, 1975, 1976
Alka Yagnik	5	1981, 1991, 1993, 1996, 1999
Udit narayan	4	1988, 1996, 1999, 2000
Anuradha Paudwal	3	1984, 1989, 1992
Asha Bhosle	3	1959, 1971, 1972
Talat Mehmood	1	1954
Hemant Kumar	1	1958

== Ameen Sayani and Radio Ceylon ==
The show was hosted throughout its entire run by Ameen Sayani. It was very popular in India, with estimated listenership ranging from 900,000 to 2,000,000. It greatly increased the popularity of Radio Ceylon, making it the primary source of popular film music on radio for the Indian subcontinent. After 1998, the show aired on Vividh Bharati and was on for half an hour on Monday nights.

== Popularity ratings method ==
At its onset in 1952, the programme did not rank songs, but rather played seven contemporary songs in no particular order. Later, the programme started ranking the most popular Hindi film songs. The songs were initially ranked by a combination of the number of records sold in India and listener votes. Popularity was gauged by record sales, verdicts from record store owners, and popularity among the shrota-sanghs or 'listeners clubs'. Each week, the shrota-sanghs would send the radio station their list of popular songs. The clubs were formed because it was possible for a record to be sold out at stores and although there was interest to buy more, the interest would not show up in record sales.

The year-end lists were compiled based on points earned by songs through the year. Between 1966 and 1970 there would sometimes be no points on the weekly broadcast, but the year-end show would be based on point system.

== Lists of top songs per year ==
Year	Song	Film	Music director	Lyricist	Singer(s)
1953	Ye Zindagi Usi ki Hai	Anarkali (film)	C. Ramachandra	Rajinder Krishan	Lata Mangeshkar
1954	Jayen To Jayen Kahan	Taxi Driver	S.D. Burman	Sahir Ludhianvi	Talat Mahmood
1955	Mera Joota Hai Japani	Shri 420	Shankar Jaikishan	Shailendra	Mukesh
1956	Ae Dil Hai Mushkil Jeena Yaha	C.I.D.	O. P. Nayyar	Majrooh Sultanpuri	Mohammed Rafi, Geeta Dutt
1957	Zara Saamne Toh Aao Chhaliye	Janam Janam Ke Phere	S. N. Tripathi	Bharat Vyas	Lata Mangeshkar, Mohammed Rafi
1958	Hai Apna Dil Toh Awara	Solva Saal	S. D. Burman	Majrooh Sultanpuri	Hemant Kumar
1959	Haal Kaisa Hai Janaab Ka	Chalti Ka Naam Gaadi	S. D. Burman	Majrooh Sultanpuri	Kishore Kumar, Asha Bhosle
1960	Zindagi Bhar Nai Bhoolegi Wo Barsaat Ki Raat	Barsaat Ki Raat	Roshan	Sahir Ludhianvi	Mohammed Rafi
1961	Teri Pyaari Pyaari Surat Ko	Sasural	Shankar Jaikishan	Hasrat Jaipuri	Mohammed Rafi
1962	Ehsaan Tera Hoga Mujh Par	Junglee	Shankar Jaikishan	Hasrat Jaipuri	Mohammed Rafi
1963	Jo Wada Kiya Woh Nibhana	Taj Mahal	Roshan	Sahir Ludhianvi	Lata Mangeshkar, Mohammed Rafi
1964	Mere Man ki Ganga aur tere man ki Jamuna ka	Sangam	Shankar Jaikishan	Shailendra	Mukesh, Vyjayanthimala
1965	Jis dil mein basa tha pyaar tera	Saheli	Kalyanji Anandji	Indeevar	Mukesh
1966	Baharon phool barsao mera mehboob aaya hai	Suraj	Shankar Jaikishan	Hasrat Jaipuri	Mohammed Rafi
1967	Saawan ka mahina pawan kare sor	Milan	Laxmikant–Pyarelal	Anand Bakshi	Lata Mangeshkar, Mukesh
1968	Dil wil pyar vyar main kya jaanu re	Shagird	Laxmikant-Pyarelal	Majrooh Sultanpuri	Lata Mangeshkar
1969	Kaise rahoon chup ki meine pee hi kya hai	Inteqam	Laxmikant-Pyarelal	Rajendra Krishna	Lata Mangeshkar
1970	Bindiya chamkegi choodi khankegi	Do Raaste	Laxmikant-Pyarelal	Anand Bakshi	Lata Mangeshkar
1971	Zindagi ek safar hai suhana	Andaz	Shankar Jaikishan	Hasrat Jaipuri	Kishore Kumar, Asha Bhosle
1972	Dum Maro Dum	Hare Raama Hare Krishna	R. D. Burman	Anand Bakshi	Asha Bhosle, Usha Iyer
1973	Yaari hai imaan mera	Zanjeer	Kalyanji Anandji	Gulshan Bawra	Manna Dey
1974	Mera jeewan koraa kaagaz	Kora Kagaz	Kalyanji Anandji	M. G. Hashmat	Kishore Kumar
1975	Baaki kuchh bacha to mahangaai maar gayee	Roti Kapada Aur Makaan	Laxmikant-Pyarelal	Varma Malik	Lata Mangeshkar, Mukesh, Jaani Babu Qawwal, Narendra
1976	Kabhi Kabhie Mere Dil Mein	Kabhi Kabhi	Khayyam	Sahir Ludhianvi	Lata Mangeshkar, Mukesh
1977	Husn haazir hai mohabbat ki sazaa paane ko	Lailaa Majnu	Madan Mohan	Sahir Ludhianvi	Lata Mangeshkar
1978	Ankhiyon ke jharokhon se, mainen dekha jo	Ankhiyon Ke Jharokhon Se	Ravindra Jain	Ravindra Jain	Hemlata
1979	O Saathi Re	Muqaddar Ka Sikandar	Kalyanji Anandji	Anjaan	Kishore Kumar
1980	Dafli Wale Dafli Baja	Sargam	Laxmikant-Pyarelal	Anand Bakshi	Lata Mangeshkar, Mohammed Rafi
1981	Mere Angane Mein	Laawaris	Kalyanji Anandji	Anjaan	Amitabh Bachchan, Alka Yagnik
1982	Angrezi Mein Kehte Hain	Khud-Daar	Rajesh Roshan	Majrooh Sultanpuri	Lata Mangeshkar, Kishore Kumar
1983	Shayad Meri Shaadi	Souten	Usha Khanna	Saawan Kumar	Lata Mangeshkar, Kishore Kumar
1984	Tu Mera Hero Hai	Hero	Laxmikant-Pyarelal	Anand Bakshi	Anuradha Paudwal, Manhar Udhas
1985	Sun Sahiba Sun	Ram Teri Ganga Maili	Ravindra Jain	Hasrat Jaipuri	Lata Mangeshkar
1986	Yashoda Ka Nandlala	Sanjog	Laxmikant-Pyarelal	Anjaan	Lata Mangeshkar
1987	Chitthi Aayi Hai	Naam	Laxmikant-Pyarelal	Anand Bakshi	Pankaj Udhas
1988	Papa Kehte Hain	Qayamat Se Qayamat Tak	Anand–Milind	Majrooh Sultanpuri	Udit Narayan
1989	My Name Is Lakhan	Ram Lakhan	Laxmikant-Pyarelal	Anand Bakshi	Mohammed Aziz, Anuradha Paudwal, Nitin Mukesh
1990	Gori Hai Kalaiyaan	Aaj Ka Arjun	Bappi Lahiri	Anjaan	Lata Mangeshkar, Shabbir Kumar
1991	Dekha Hai Pehli Baar	Saajan	Nadeem-Shravan	Sameer	Alka Yagnik, S. P. Balasubrahmanyam
1992	Maine Pyar Tumhi Se	Phool Aur Kaante	Nadeem-Shravan	Sameer	Kumar Sanu, Anuradha Paudwal
1993	Choli Ke Peechhe	Khalnayak	Laxmikant-Pyarelal	Anand Bakshi	Alka Yagnik, Ila Arun
1994	Didi Tera Devar Deewana	Hum Apke Hain Kon	Raamlaxman	Dev Kohli	Lata Mangeshkar, S. P. Balasubrahmanyam
1995	Tujhe Dekha Toh	Dilwale Dulhaniya Lejainge	Jatin–Lalit	Anand Bakshi	Lata Mangeshkar, Kumar Sanu
1996	Pardesi Jana nahin	Raja Hindustani	Nadeem-Shravan	Sameer	Alka Yagnik, Udit Narayan
1997	Sandese Aate Hai	Border	Anu Malik	Javed Akhtar	Sonu Nigam, Roop Kumar Rathod
1998	Chaiyya Chaiyya	Dil Se	AR Rahman	Gulzar	Sukhwinder Singh, Sapna Awasthi
1999	Taal Se Taal	Taal	AR Rahman	Anand Bakshi	Udit Narayan, Alka Yagnik
2000	Humko Hame Sey Churra Lo	Mohabbatein	Jatin–Lalit	Anand Bakshi	Lata Mangeshkar, Udit Narayan

== Silver jubilee and LP record ==
On 12 December 1977, Binaca Geetmala celebrated its 25-year anniversary in a social gathering organized in Bombay. Many well known composers, poets, and singers attended the show.

The top songs from 1953 to 1977 were compiled and released in a two record volume set. Volume 1 has songs from 1953 to 1964; volume 2 has songs from 1965 to 1977. Between the songs on the volume set, there is commentary by Ameen Sayani.

== See also ==
- Ameen Sayani
- Bollywood songs
- Radio Ceylon
