= S. N. Swamy (artist) =

Indian artist (1911–1983)

Padmashree Singannachar Narasimha Swamy (1911 – 19 December 1983) was an Indian artist who lived and worked in India his whole life. An alumnus of Chamaraja Technical Institute, Mysore and Sir J.J School of Arts, Bombay, Swamy, as affectionately referred to, moved around in high circles, with friendships with Pandit Jawaharlal Nehru (the first Prime Minister of Independent India), Mahatma Gandhi, Lord Mountbatten of Burma and the like. His paintings and other works of art can be found in various government offices, museums and personal collections around the world.

Born in Mysore, India, to a traditional family of artists, he took to art naturally as he was introduced to the field by his father "Swarnakala Nipuna" Singannacharya, who was a goldsmith of Mysore Palace, by taking the young Swamy to his work. Starting his career with being the Mysore Palace photographer and later Mysore Palace artist he went on to being art director with Dadasaheb Phalke in prabhat studio, Pune, director of Karnataka State Tourism Development Corporation and member of Central Lalitha Kala Academy and Central Sangeeth Kala Academy, New Delhi. His models for oil paintings range from the likes of Lord Mountbatten of Burma, Mahatma Gandhi and so on. His passion was to do pencil sketches, which was his specialization, of world-renowned personalities and get them autographed by the subject. Some of the likes being Albert Einstein, Winston Churchill, David Low, Adolf Hitler, George Bernard Shaw, H. G. Wells, Bernard Montgomery, Franklin D. Roosevelt, etc.

He has received many awards in his recognition as an accomplished artist. In 1969 he was awarded the national award, Padma Shri, in recognition of his contribution to the field of art and the State Lalitha Kala Academy award in November 1966. Some of his books which have been published are, Temple Sculptures of India, Messenger of Peace and Priyadarshini.

== Early life and family ==
S.N. Swamy was born in Mysore, India in 1911 as a single child to "Swarnakalanipuna" Singannacharya (1875-February 1967), a goldsmith and sculptor in the Mysore Palace, famous for his works of the Golden Howda and the Golden Throne at the Mysore Palace, and Thayamma. His father, Singannacharya, a master goldsmith and sculptor, is accredited with many a works of art which find a place of prominence in many palaces, temples and religious institutions around India. If his grandfather, Narasimhachar, also a goldsmith and sculptor at the Mysore Palace, is remembered for his creation of the golden umbrella adorning the deity at Tirupathi, his granduncle, Singanna, is remembered for the silver bust of Maharaja Krishna Raja Wadiyar IV in Mysore Palace.

== Education ==
Swamy attended the Mission High School and completed his matriculation. Always accompanying his father to the palace and looking him work, Swamy started to sketch the sculptors and started assisting his father by sketching designs and figures. Seeing Swamy discontinue studies and his interest in art, Singannacharya joined him to the Chamaraja Technical Institution, Mysore in 1928 and saw him finish in 1932. In the Fine Arts section of the Mysore Dasara Exhibition 1931, an oil painting of S.N. Swamy, "Honored Old Age"(a study of an old lady in brick red saree and drab background) won the silver medal.

Once, on his ride on Irwin road in Mysore, the then Maharaja, Krishna Raja Wadeyar iv, who had watched Swamy sketching at the palace on a few occasions, saw him whiling away his time with friends. Upon seeing the Maharaja, Swamy ran inside his house and the Maharaja sent for him and advised him to not waste time and work at what he is good at. In response, Swamy drew a fine sketch of the Maharaja and received appreciation. Following which the Maharaja sponsored Swamy to do his master's degree in art at Sir. J.J. School of Arts, Bombay, in 1934. At Sir. J.J. School of Arts, Swamy studied under the tutelage of the eminent art teacher, Durandhar. During this period, Swamy used to interact with well-known artists like Sir Desai, Haldankar, Sithawar, Karmarkar, A.X. Tendon, on a regular basis. He won the gold medal at the Shimla Art Exhibition for his series of paintings titled "My Model", the paintings was of a Maharastrian woman. Sometime later, paintings based on "My Model" by Swamy's friend, artist Mac Millian, won the award. In Mysore Dussera Art Exhibition Swamys "My Model" series won the S.B. Shastry memorial award. A painting done at this time titled "Figure from Life" is presently at the British Museum, London. He completed his studies at Sir J.J. School of Arts in 1938.

== Personal life ==
Swamy got married at the age of 13 years to Dodda Narasamma, aged 11 years. His father-in-law, T. Yelakapachar, was a very wealthy and famous man, being a palace contractor, who is credited along with his elder brother, T. Cheluvachar and father, Timmiachar for the construction of the Durbar Hall of the Mysore Palace. In 1928, Swamy became a father on the birth of a son S Chinna Krishna, and a few years later his second son N Vasudev was born. Swamy used to live in his father's house on Irwin road, opposite to the five-faced Anjenaya temple. He later moved into "Dilkush Cottage", a palace bungalow on Hyder Ali road, previously occupied by eminent guests of the Maharaja, one of whom was the late singer Gauhar Jan. In Dilkush Cottage, Swamy entertained guests such as, Prime Minister Indira Gandhi, Chief Ministers of Karnataka and many important people.

== Final years ==
Swamy kept on painting and sketching till his last years. He spent his last years in his Geetha mandir road residence, "Shree Nilaya". After the demise of his wife in 1982, he became very lonely and died in Holdsworth Memorial Hospital on 19 December 1983.

== List of paintings ==
Noteworthy among his many paintings are portraits of Lady Edwina Mountbatten of Burma and Mahatma Gandhi His pencil sketch of Richard M. Nixon was used for the January 1969 cover of SPAN magazine. His sketch of Dwight D. Eisenhower is with the Smithsonian. Swamy's gift of Sir Rabindranath Tagore's pencil sketch to George Bernard Shaw, still hangs in Shaw's residence.
