= Sundaraja Sitharama Iyengar =

Indian computer scientist (born 1947)

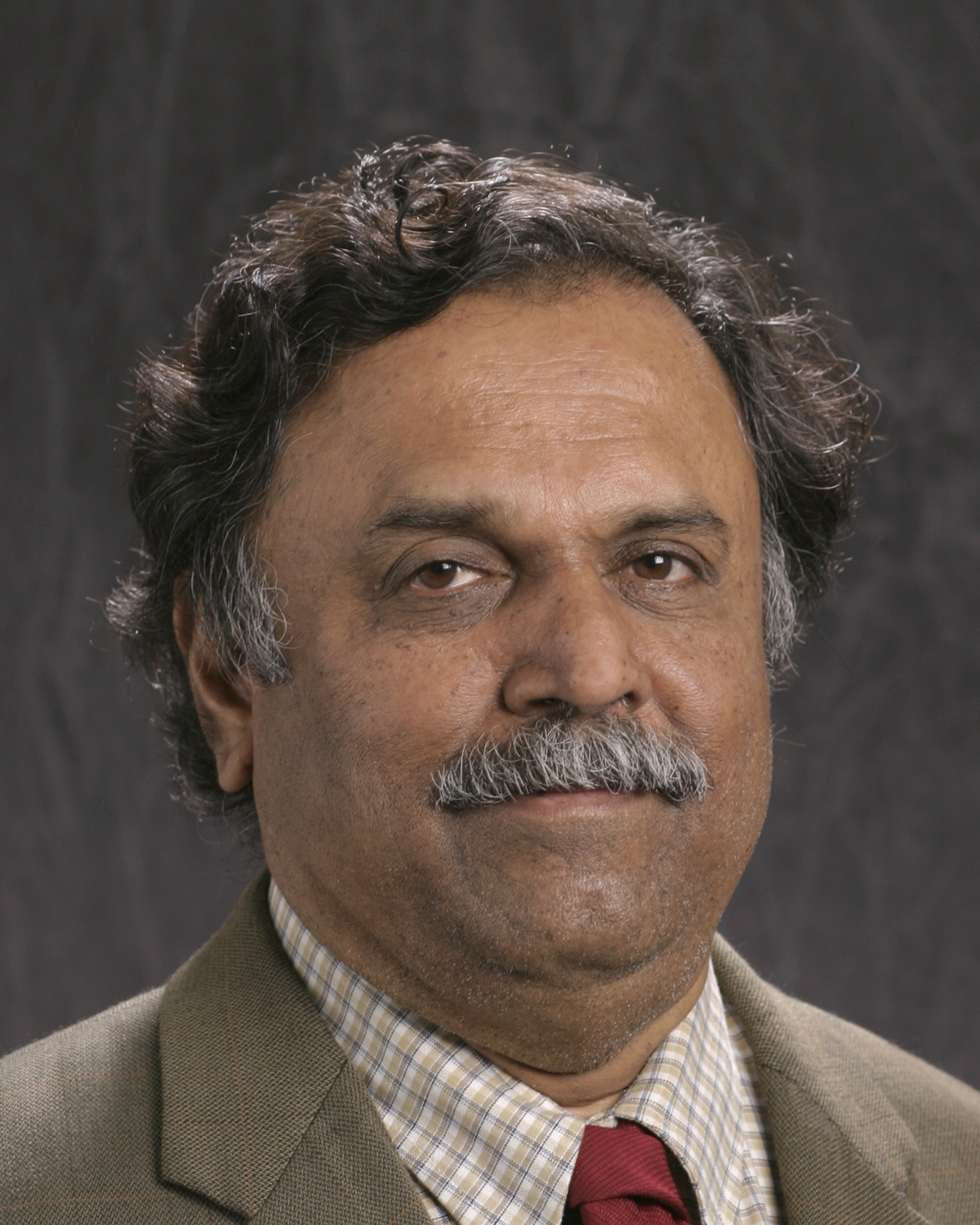
- Born: 26 August 1947 (age 79); Hemmige, Mysore State, Dominion of India (present-day Karnataka, India)
- Known for: Brooks-Iyengar algorithm, Song (KAIST) - Iyengar (LSU) MobiCon Middleware Computing Platform, Lu-Wu-Iyengar New Detection Algorithm for Spectrum Sensing
- Scientific career
- Fields: Distributed Sensor Networks, Robotics
- Workplaces: FIU, LSU, Oak Ridge National Lab, Jet Propulsion Lab, US Naval Research Lab, US Army National Office, Indian Institute of Science

Sundaraja Sitharama Iyengar (born 26 August 1947) is an Indian-American computer scientist and engineer known for his contributions to artificial intelligence, distributed sensor networks, robotics, data fusion, cybersecurity, and digital forensics. He is a Distinguished University Professor and Ryder Professor at Florida International University (FIU) in Miami, Florida.

Iyengar is known for co-developing the Brooks–Iyengar algorithm, a method for fault-tolerant distributed sensor fusion. He has also contributed to detection algorithms for spectrum sensing in wireless communication systems. Over his career, he has authored more than 650 scholarly publications and over 30 books in the fields of computing and engineering.

He has been affiliated with institutions including Florida International University, Louisiana State University, Oak Ridge National Laboratory, the Jet Propulsion Laboratory, the U.S. Naval Research Laboratory, the U.S. Army Research Office, and the Indian Institute of Science.

== Early life and education ==
Iyengar was born on 26 August 1947 in Hemmige, Mysore State, India (present-day Karnataka), and moved with his family to Bangalore in 1949.

He received a Bachelor of Engineering degree in mechanical engineering from the University Visvesvaraya College of Engineering in 1968 and a Master of Engineering degree from the Indian Institute of Science in 1970. He completed his Ph.D. in engineering from Mississippi State University in 1974.

He has also received several honorary doctorates, including a Ph.D. (honoris causa) from Nanjing University of Posts and Telecommunications (2017), a Doctor of Science (D.Sc.) from Techno Global University (2010), a D.Sc. from Poznan University of Technology (2023), and a D.Sc. from Siddhartha University (2024).

== Career ==
From 1992 to 2011, Iyengar served as the Roy Paul Daniels Professor and Chair of the Department of Computer Science at Louisiana State University (LSU), where he founded the Robotics Research Laboratory, contributing to early research in robotics and intelligent systems.

In 2011, he joined Florida International University, where he served as Ryder Professor and Director of the School of Computing and Information Sciences from 2011 to 2020. In 2018, he was appointed Distinguished University Professor. He currently serves as Director of the Discovery Lab at Florida International University and Director of the U.S. Army-funded Center of Excellence in Digital Forensics. At FIU, he has contributed to interdisciplinary research in intelligent systems, data analytics, and large-scale computing. He also played a key role in establishing a $2.25 million U.S. Army-funded Digital Forensics Center of Excellence in collaboration with multiple universities.

He has also contributed to initiatives promoting research translation and innovation, including involvement in FIU's technology and entrepreneurship ecosystem. Iyengar has held visiting and honorary academic positions, including Homi Bhabha Distinguished Professor at IGCAR, Kalpakkam and Satish Dhawan Professor at the Indian Institute of Science.

He also holds honorary Distinguished Chair Professorships at institutions such as National Forensic Sciences University, Jain University, PES University, Chanakya University, and Acharya Patashala. In addition to academic roles, he has served as a technical adviser to startups including Assurgent Aerospace, IYENTECH Inc., Xpay Life, and Sunplus Software Technologies. He has also contributed to technology leadership initiatives, including serving as president for Technology at Noetic Nexus.

He also holds honorary Distinguished Chair Professorships at National Forensics Sciences University, Jain University, PES University, Chanakya University, and Acharya Patashala in India. He played a key role in establishing a $2.25 million US Army Funded Digital Forensics Center of Excellence in collaboration with several Universities globally.

== Research ==
Iyengar's research spans artificial intelligence, distributed sensor networks, robotics, bioinformatics, cognitive systems, and parallel computing.

He is the co-inventor of the Brooks–Iyengar algorithm, a widely cited method for fault-tolerant distributed sensor fusion. His work on grid coverage algorithms, cognitive information processing systems, and complex event processing has been applied in defense systems, healthcare technologies, and environmental monitoring.

His research emphasizes large-scale data processing, multi-source data integration, intelligent decision-making systems, and real-time analytics and system optimization.

He has authored or co-authored more than 650 peer-reviewed publications and over 30 books published by MIT Press, Springer, John Wiley, and CRC Press. His research has been funded by major agencies, including the National Science Foundation (NSF), Defense Advanced Research Projects Agency (DARPA), NASA, Department of Energy (DOE), Office of Naval Research (ONR), and the United States Army Research Office.

His work has influenced both academic research and practical applications in intelligent computing, large-scale data systems, and interdisciplinary technologies. He has served on editorial boards of scientific journals and on review panels for agencies including the National Science Foundation (NSF), National Institutes of Health (NIH), and the U.S. National Academies.

== Honors and recognition ==
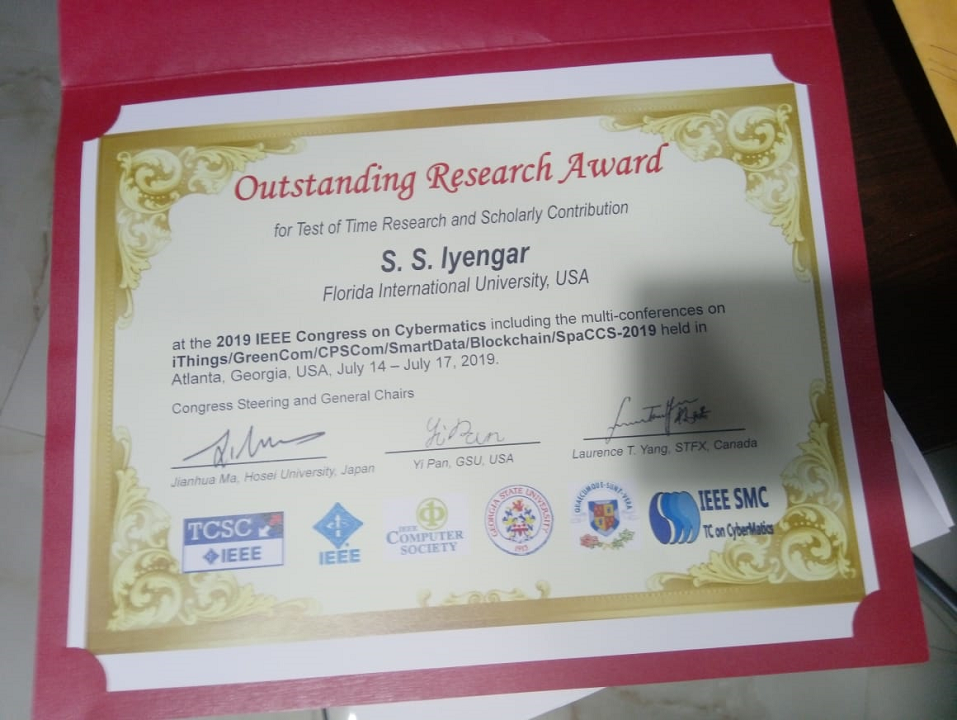
Award Certificate

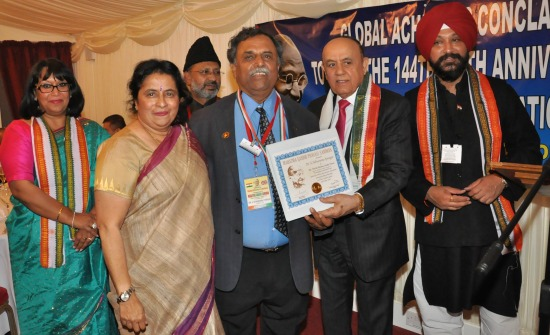
NRI Mahatma Gandhi Award, House of Lords, London

- Karnataka Rajyotsava Award (2023).
