= Thia Kirubarajan =

Thia (Kiruba) Kirubarajan
- Born: Sri Lanka
- Education: University of Cambridge; University of Connecticut
- Known for: Estimation theory; multisensor–multitarget tracking; information fusion
- Awards: Canada Research Chair in Information Fusion
- Scientific career
- Fields: Electrical and computer engineering; information fusion
- Workplaces: McMaster University

Thia (Kiruba) Kirubarajan is a Canada-based electrical engineer and academic, currently serving as a Distinguished Engineering Professor and Canada Research Chair in Information Fusion at McMaster University in Hamilton, Ontario. He is also Associate Chair (Graduate) in McMaster’s Department of Electrical and Computer Engineering.

== Academic background and position ==
According to McMaster University, Kirubarajan holds degrees from the University of Cambridge (B.A., M.A.) and from a U.S. institution where he completed his M.S. and Ph.D. studies. He serves as a Distinguished Engineering Professor and Canada Research Chair in Information Fusion within McMaster’s Department of Electrical and Computer Engineering.

His faculty page lists research interests including multisensor–multitarget tracking, estimation theory, information fusion, sensor resource management, radar/sonar/image/signal processing.

== Research and contributions ==
Kirubarajan is internationally recognized for his work in estimation theory, multisensor–multitarget tracking, and information fusion. His research has been cited extensively in the scientific literature, with his publications collectively accruing over 18,000 citations as of 2025.

He has co-authored influential works in data fusion and target tracking, including the chapter "Multitarget–Multisensor Tracking", regarded as a foundational reference in the field. His broader publication record—spanning more than 300 articles—covers topics such as estimation theory, sensor fusion, resource allocation, and statistical signal processing.

== Roles and honours ==
- Holds the Canada Research Chair in Information Fusion.
- Distinguished Engineering Professor, Department of Electrical and Computer Engineering, McMaster University.
- Associate Chair (Graduate Studies), McMaster ECE Department.

== Research group and mentorship ==
Kirubarajan leads the Information Fusion Research Group at McMaster, supervising graduate students and researchers on topics such as multitarget tracking, estimation, and data fusion. He has supervised numerous graduate theses, including work on multisensor tracking and target association. One example is the thesis "Multitarget Tracking Using Multistatic Sensors" (2015, McMaster University).

== Influence and impact ==
Kirubarajan’s research in information fusion has influenced both theoretical development and applied technologies in radar, sonar, and autonomous sensor systems. His extensive citation record and leadership of a federally funded research chair underscore his impact in the fields of estimation theory and target tracking.

== Selected publications ==
- Kirubarajan, T.; Bar-Shalom, Y. Sensor Management for Large-Scale Multisensor–Multitarget Tracking.
- Kirubarajan, T.; Tharmarasa, R.; et al. Multitarget–Multisensor Tracking.

== See also ==
- Estimation theory
- Data fusion
- McMaster University
