= Jocelyn Chanussot =

French electrical engineer

Jocelyn Chanussot (French: [ʒɔslɛ̃ ʃanyso]) is a Professor of signal and image processing at the Grenoble Institute of Technology in Grenoble, France. Chanussot was named a Fellow of the Institute of Electrical and Electronics Engineers (IEEE) in 2012 for his contributions to data fusion and image processing for remote sensing. Since January 2011, he serves as Editor-in-Chief of the IEEE Journal of Selected Topics in Applied Earth Observations and Remote Sensing and is a former member of the Institut Universitaire de France.
