= Venkatesh K. R. Kodur =

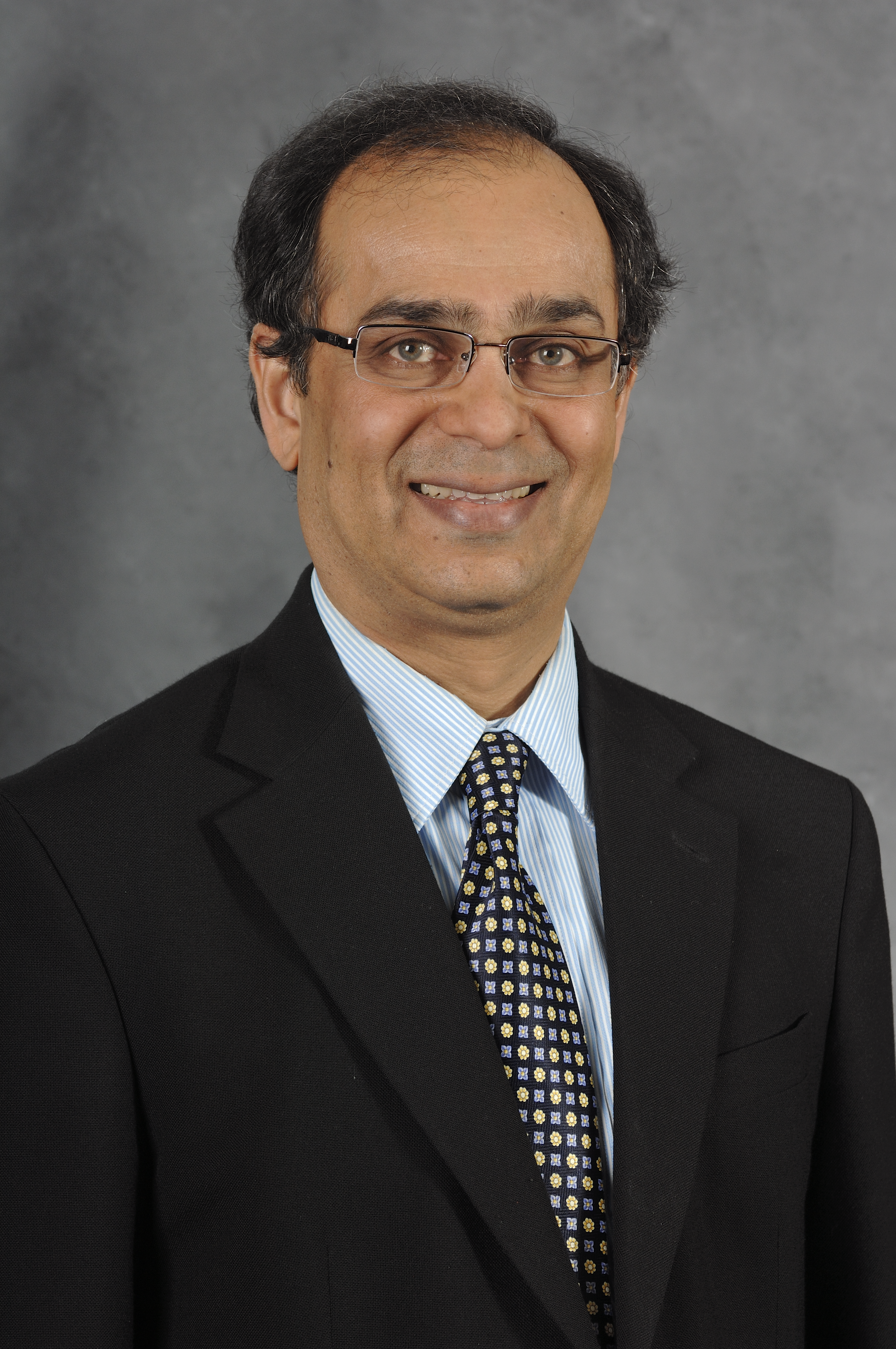
- Born: Kodur, Karnataka, India
- Education: Queen's University; Bangalore University; National College
- Known for: Structural engineering, Structural fire engineering, Fire resistant design, High performing construction materials, post-fire investigations.
- Scientific career
- Fields: Structural engineering, Fire safety, Structural fire engineering, Material behavior, Failure investigations
- Workplaces: Michigan State University, Queens University, University of Visveswaraya College of Engineering, National Research Council (Canada), Indian Institute of Science, University of Waterloo, Indian Institute of Technology Delhi, Ewha Womans University
- Doctoral advisor: Ivan Campbell, Queens University, Canada
- Website: https://www.egr.msu.edu/kodur/

Notes
- University Distinguished Professor and Director, SAFE-D Center, Department of Civil and Environmental Engineering, Michigan State University

Venkatesh Kumar R Kodur is a scientist and university professor, currently at Michigan State University. He was born in Kodur village in Karnataka India, received his bachelor's degree in Civil engineering from the University of Visvesvaraya College of Engineering, Bangalore, India, in 1984. He received his M.Sc. and Ph.D. degrees from Queen's University at Kingston, Canada, in 1988 and 1992, respectively. Following a brief stint as a Post-doctoral Fellow at Royal Military College, Kingston, Canada, he joined the National Research Council (Canada), where as senior scientist, he carried out extensive research in structural fire safety field. In 2005, he joined the faculty of Michigan State University (MSU), where he is currently a University Distinguished Professor in the Department of Civil & Environmental Engineering. Kodur has established unique fire test facilities and highly acclaimed research program in structural fire engineering area at MSU and is the founding director of the Center on Structural Fire Safety and Diagnostics.

Kodur's research has focused on the experimental behavior and analytical modeling of structural systems under extreme fire conditions, Constitutive modelling of material properties at elevated temperatures, Fire resistance design of structural systems, Application of AI/ML techniques, and Building collapse investigations. His contributions to the field of structural fire safety and high performing construction materials are seminal and numerous, and his research accomplishments have had major impacts. He has developed fundamental understanding on the behavior of materials and structural systems under extreme fire conditions. The techniques and methodologies resulting from his research is instrumental for minimizing the destructive impact of fire in the built infrastructure, which continues to cause thousands of deaths and billions of dollars of damage each year in the US and around the world. Many of these design approaches and fire resistance solutions have been incorporated in to various construction codes and design standards in the US and around the world.

Kodur has advised around 25 postdoctoral researchers, 26 PhD students, 25 MS students and number of undergraduate students over the last 20 years. Many of his (former) PhD and postdoctoral students are currently faculty members in reputed universities throughout the world. Dr. Kodur, together with his students and collaborators, has published results from his research in 500+ peer-reviewed papers in journals and conferences, and has given numerous key-note presentations in major international conferences. He is one of the highly cited authors in Civil Engineering and Fire Protection Engineering disciplines, and as per Google Scholar, he has more than 21,500 citations with an "h" index of 81. The most recent contribution from Kodur is a new text book on "Structural Fire Engineering" published by McGraw-Hill Education.

He has been elected as Fellow of seven Institutes/Academies: Canadian Academy of Engineering, Royal Society of Canada, American Society of Civil Engineers, Indian National Academy of Engineering, Structural Engineering Institute, American Concrete Institute and the Society of Fire Protection Engineers. He is a professional engineer, Associate Editor of Journal of Structural Engineering, and Journal of Structural Fire Engineering, editorial board member of five leading journals, Chairman of ASCE-29 (Fire) Standards Committee, and a member of UK-EPSRC College of Reviewers.

== Awards ==
- Elected Fellow of American Society of Civil Engineers, ASCE, 2005
- University Distinguished Faculty Award, MSU, 2011
- University Distinguished Professor Award, 2017
