= G. Guruswamy =

American engineer

Guru Guruswamy is an American engineer working as principal scientist at Ames Research Center since 1988. He pioneered research in the area of computational aeroelasticity that involves unsteady aerodynamics, finite element methods, computational fluid dynamics, parallel computing and problem-solving environments. His research was utilized in the first commercial 3-D computational aeroelasticity software developed by a major aerospace industry. The aeroelasticity legend Holt Ashley extensively referred to Guruswamy's research in his classical review paper. In 1988 he demonstrated the unique use of transonic small perturbation based CFD for designing active controls to increase the safety of aircraft. It was followed by a breakthrough development of Euler flow equations-based computational aeroelasticity. It was cited by another aeroelasticity legend John Dugundji of MIT as an important milestone in Aeroelasticity.

== Personal ==
Guruswamy was born in Bangalore, went to elementary school in a village Bidadi, and attended middle school at SLN Middle School in Bengaluru. Guruswamy completed his high school at National High School, Basavanagudi, and received an undergraduate degree in civil engineering with first rank from UVCE and Masters in Structural Engineering with high distinction at IISc. He was the first undergraduate degree holder in his family. Later, he obtained his PhD at Purdue in Aeronautical Engineering with 100% GPA.

== Book chapters ==
Guruswamy authored a chapter on software in the popular text book on finite element analysis by Prof Henry T. Yang Chancellor of UC Santa Barbara. The self-contained source code provides a systematic learning tool for students. It is used as a text book at many universities including Stanford. A summary of his research for the last four decades is archived in the second edition of a Handbook by McGraw Hill.

== Software in Computational Aeroelasticity ==
Guruswamy single-handedly developed the first Euler Navier–Stokes equations-based aeroelastic code ENSAERO that received NASA Space Act Award. He led a team of 10 scientist to develop a three level parallel aeroelastic software HiMAP (High Fidelity Multidisciplinary Process) to model fluid/structures/controls interactions by using Euler Navier–Stokes flow equations coupled with modal/finite-element structural equations. HiMAP received NASA software release award. Guruswamy's research helped to design one of the world's most sophisticated aircraft that was displayed at a air show in his home town Bangalore.

== Parachute Research ==
Guruswamy has worked extensively in the field parachute simulation and has developed first-of-its kind high fidelity time accurate methods. His work was related to Entry, Descent and Landing of Mars mission. Parachute was successfully used to land spacecraft on Mars.

== Helicopter Research ==
Guruswamy introduced a time accurate simulation procedure for helicopter aeroelasticity based on the Navier-Stokes and finite-element equations, a break through improvement over previously used quasi-steady hybrid loose coupling methods. His research makes possible to simulate gust related transient conditions that may be faced by helicopters like Ingenuity (helicopter) in Mars atmosphere.

== Air Taxis and Drones ==
Guruswamy has pioneered research in the area of stability analysis of Urban air mobility vehicle including drones by using the high fidelity aerodynamic modeling. Demonstrated results for take-off of a air taxi and flutter of wing of an electric aircraft. His work on active controls of Air Taxis is highlighted in a NASA report with animation.

== Recognition ==
Guruswamy is recognized for his contributions to CFD based computational Aeroelasticity through several awards and invited talks. He is also listed in the prestigious 'Prof Satish Dhawan Visiting Professor/Scientist Program' of Indian Institute of Sciences to facilitate initiation of new research activities and mentoring PhD students. He is listed as one of the notable alumni of Indian Institute of Sciences. He has received the prestigious NASA HQ TGIR award

== Plays ==
Guruswamy founded an amateur Kannada drama troupe 'Chitra-Vichitra' in 1984 in Silicon Valley He wrote and directed 5 dramas staged under the sponsorship of a cultural association Kannada Koota of Northern California KKNC He also played harmonium for drama.
