= National High School, Basavanagudi =

Government high school in India

Coordinates: 12.9491°N 77.5728°E

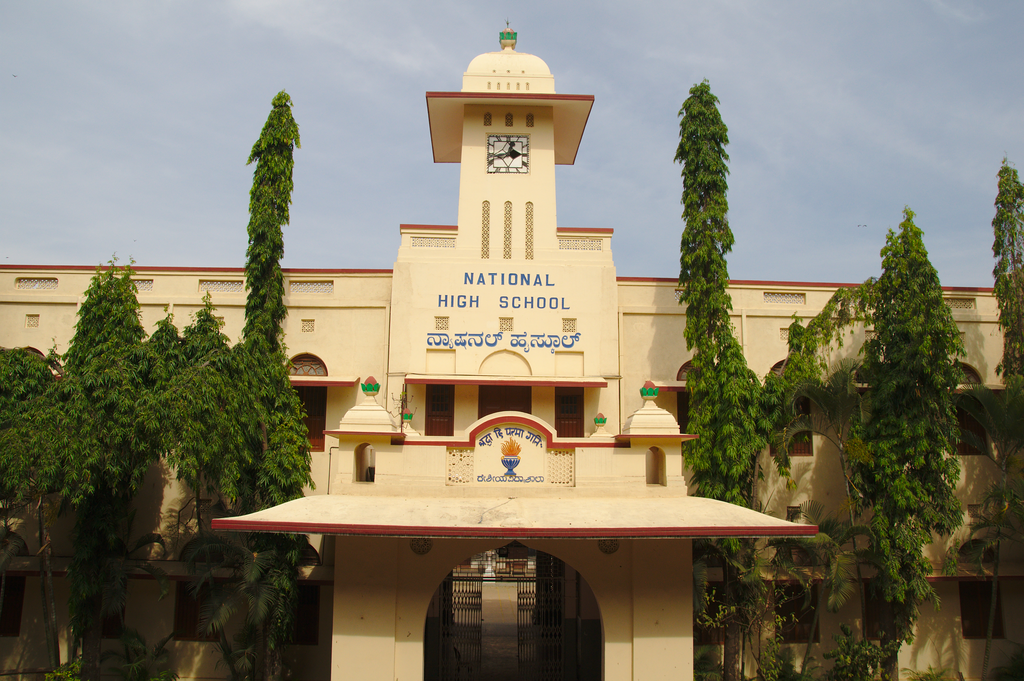
National High School, Basavanagudi

National High School (or NHS) is a government-aided high school in the Basavanagudi section of Bangalore, India.

With grades/classes for 8th, 9th and 10th, NHS caters to academically eligible students regardless of religion or caste. NHS is run by the National Education Society (NES).

== History ==
In 1917 Annie Besant and several others founded NHS in Bangalore. During its early years, NHS hosting several activists for Indian independence from Great Britain. Mahatma Gandhi visited NHS on several occasions.

=== 1990s–present ===
The institution was highly reputed for a long time – since inception and until the mid 1990s. A huge influx of private schools since late 1980s drastically changed the education scenario in Karnataka as well as rest of India, which led to a steady decline in the sheen on National High School.

Several attempts have been made by distinguished alumni to restore the glory of National High School, an attempt by Anil Kumble (along with Dr CNR Rao who studied in National College) was made with hope of adequate funding to modernize the institution. However, the attempt did not materialize.

Most recently, a technology organization owned by an alumnus stepped in to set up a Robotics and Artificial Intelligence Lab at the school.

== Admission ==
Admission is open to all qualifying students without regard to religion, caste or creed. NHS requires an overall score of 85%–90% in the seventh standard exam for admission

== Alumni ==
- Srinath - Indian actor and film producer
- H.D. Kumaraswamy – Chief Minister of Karnataka.
- Anil Kumble – cricketer
- Ramesh Aravind – film actor
- Chandrashekar – film actor
- Dr Vishnuvardhan – film actor
- Raghunath. N – deputy manager, Bharat Electronics Limited, Ministry of Defence, Government of India
- Vinayak Joshi – film actor
- Arjun Sarja – famous movie actor
- Sunil Rao – film actor
- Srujan Lokesh – stand-up comedian
- EAS Prasanna – cricketer
- Prakash Podukone – ex badminton player
- Manharlal Pranlal Thakkar – justice of the Supreme Court of India
- G. Guruswamy – principal scientist, NASA

== Faculty ==
- Venkatarama Bhattar – Sanskrit (Pratibha Bhushana awardee) (Headmaster)
