= University of Visvesvaraya College of Engineering =

Government engineering college in Bangalore, India

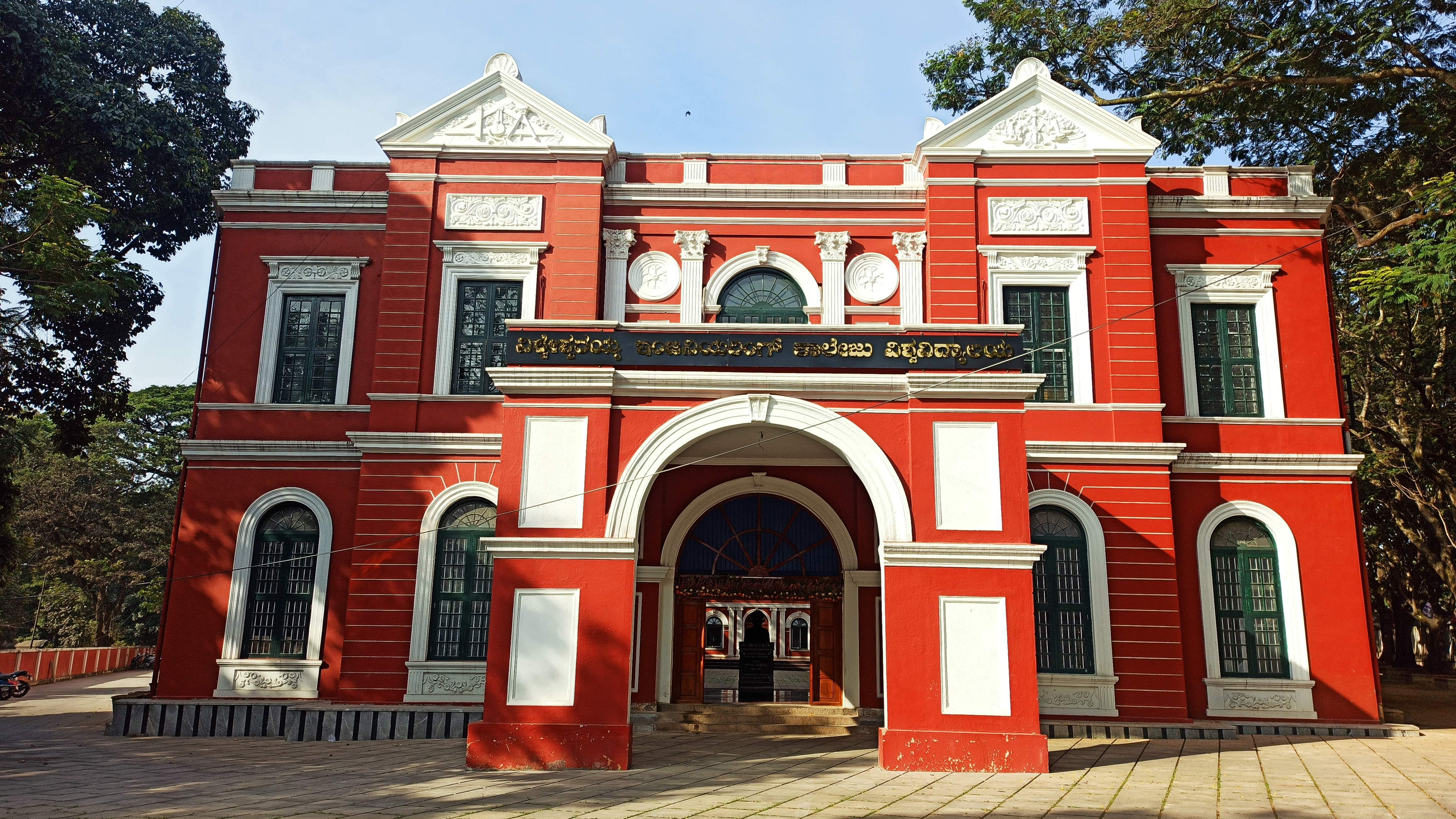
- UVCE Main Building
- Type: Public technical university
- Established: 1917; 109 years ago
- Parent institution: University of Mysore (1917–1964); Bangalore University (1964–2021); University of Visvesvaraya College of Engineering (2022–present)
- Accreditation: AICTE, NAAC
- Chairman: Shri Atul Kumar Tiwari
- Director: Subhasish Tripathy
- Founder: Sir M. Visvesvaraya
- Location: UVCE, K R Circle, Bengaluru 560001, Bengaluru, Karnataka, India; 12°58′31″N 77°35′12″E
- Campus: K R Circle campus – 15 acres (6.1 ha); Jnana Bharathi campus – 50 acres (20 ha)
- Website: uvce.ac.in; campusuvce.in; uvce.karnataka.gov.in

University of Visvesvaraya College of Engineering (UVCE) is a public state university located in Bengaluru, Karnataka, India. The Government of Karnataka has declared it as an Institution of State Eminence for its contributions to engineering sciences since 2022. The institution was founded in 1917 by Bharat Ratna, Sir M Visvesvaraya during the reign of Maharaja Krishnaraja Wodeyar.

It was previously known as the College of Engineering, Bangalore. It is the first engineering college in Karnataka and the fifth engineering college to be established in India. The institution offers degrees such as B.Tech, B.Arch, M.Tech and PhD in various disciplines of Engineering and Architecture.

UVCE was the University College of Engineering of the University of Mysore from 1917 to 1964, and of the Bangalore University from 1964 to 2021.

It has been a centre of excellence in engineering education, with prominent alumni such as M R Srinivasan, Roddam Narasimha FRS, V K Aatre, Prahlada Rama Rao etc, who have contributed to the development of the nation. The Government of Karnataka constituted the Sadagopan Committee to draft the UVCE Act 2021, which was passed by the State Legislative Assembly of Karnataka in 2022, making UVCE a State Autonomous Public University, to be developed on the lines of the IITs. This act grants UVCE the status of an Institution of State Eminence.

== History ==
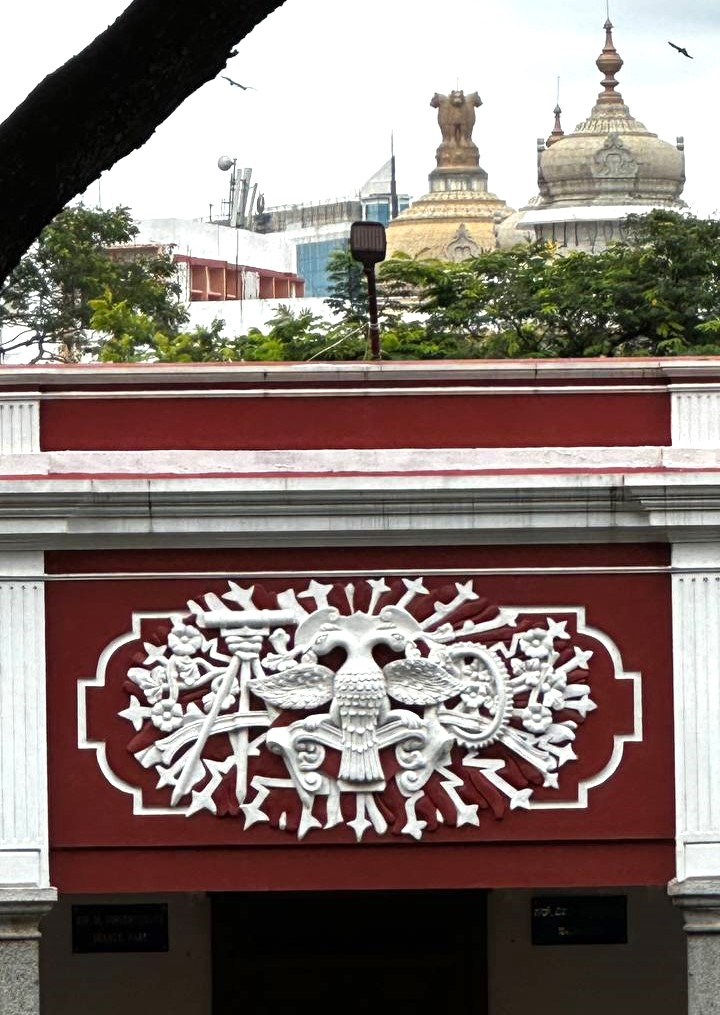
Engineering Gandabherunda, UVCE

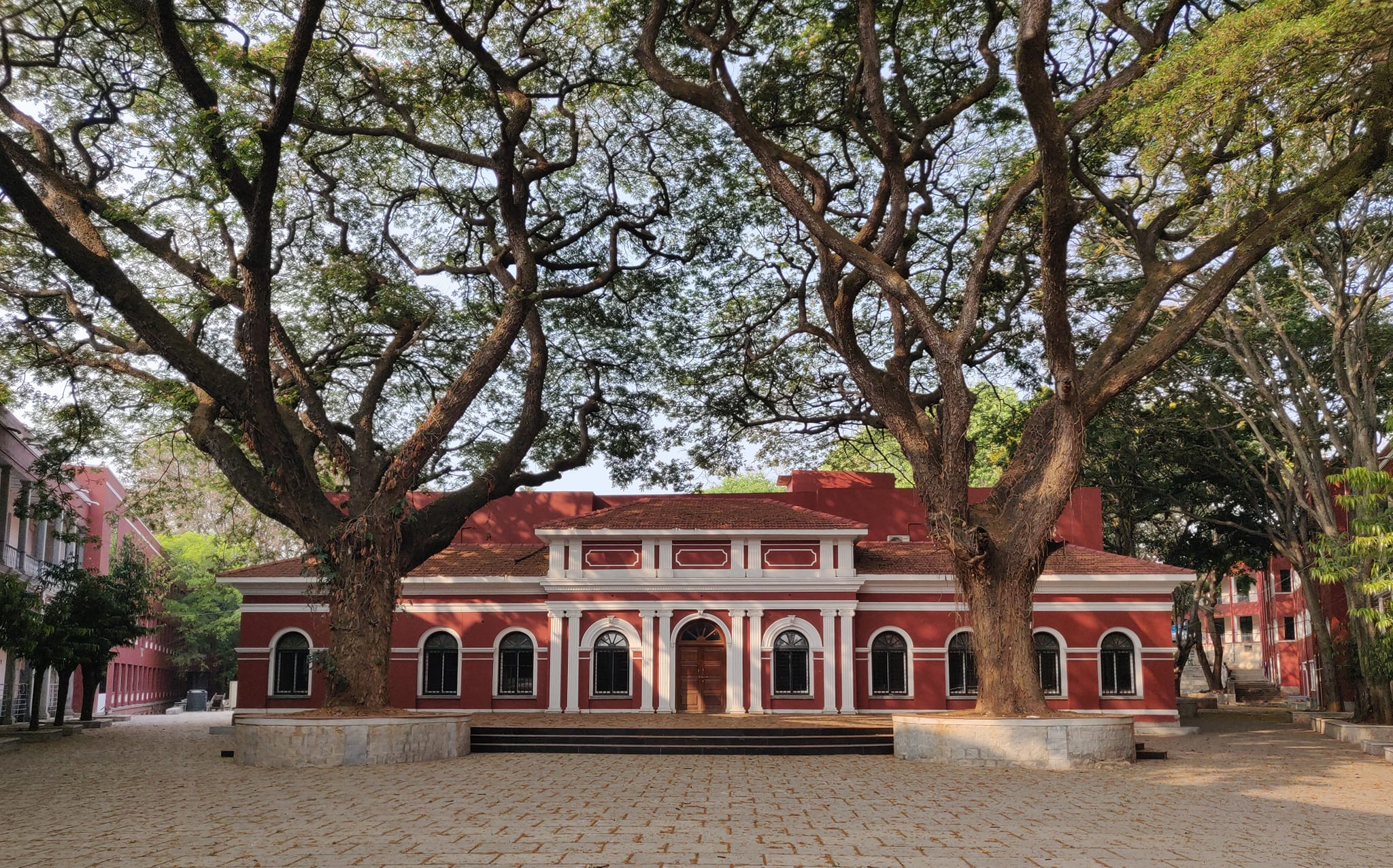
Minchu - Marvel

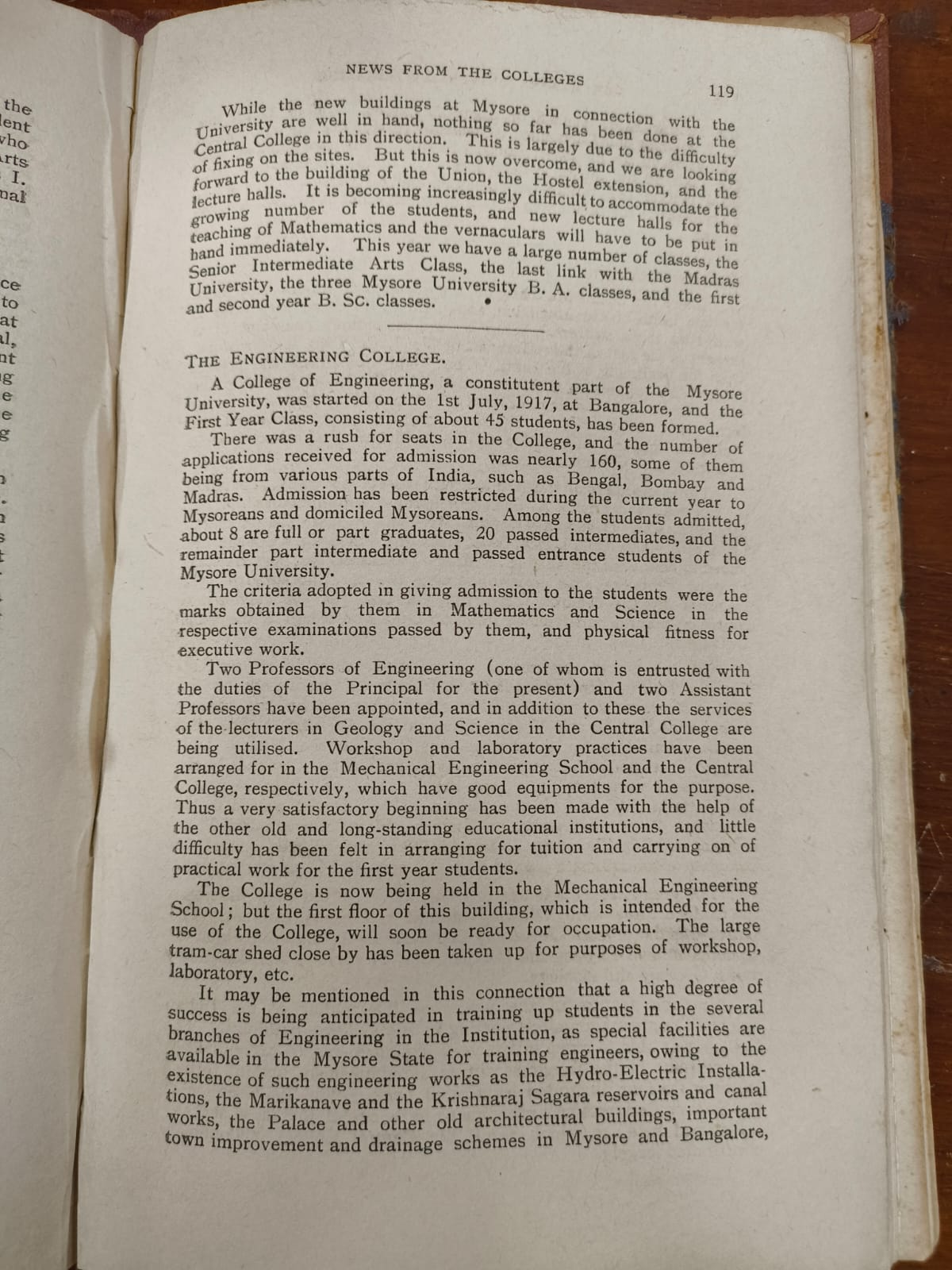
Mysore University Calendar - 1918

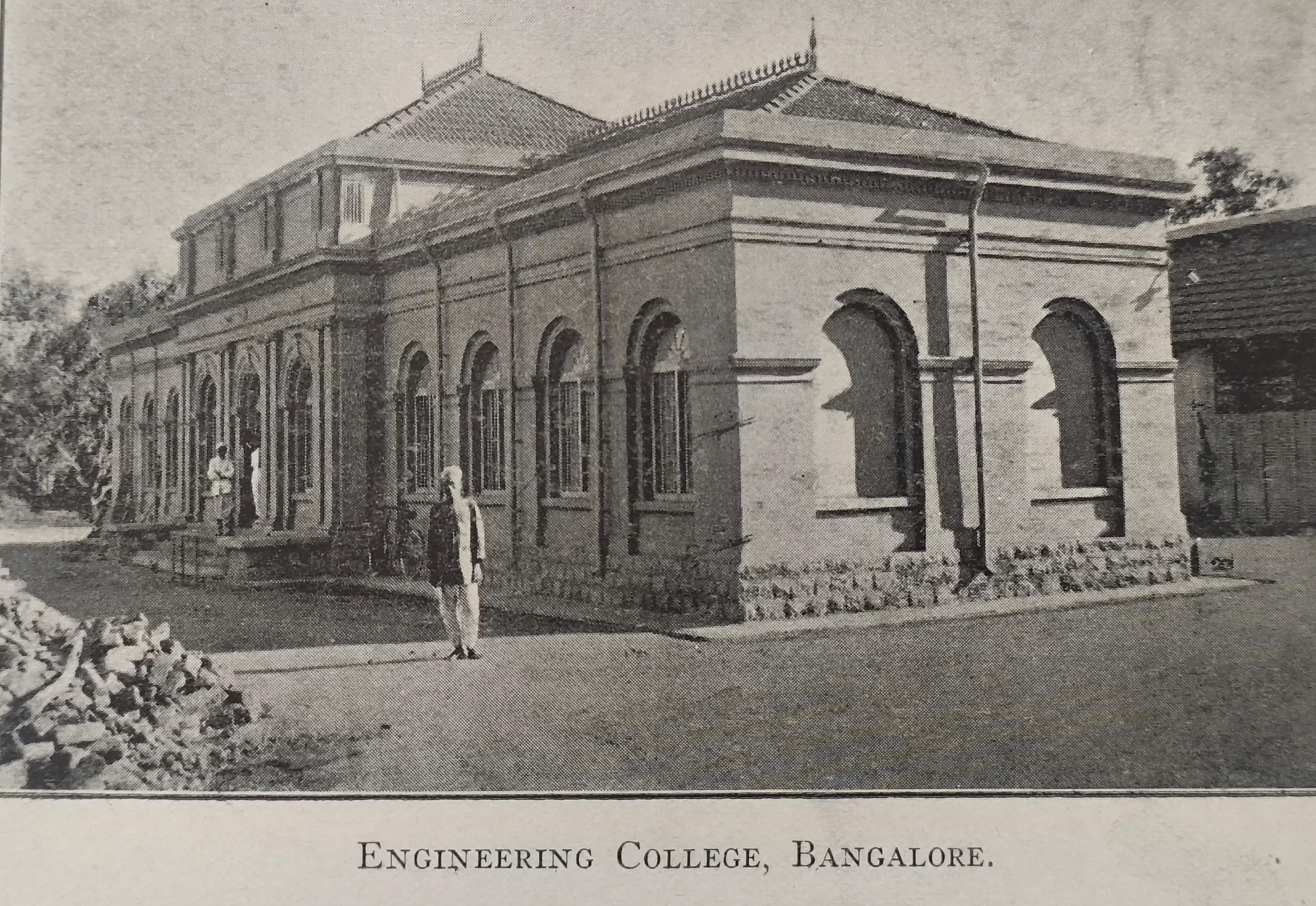
UVCE Library, 1917

UVCE was established as the College of Engineering, Bangalore, in a time when there were no engineering colleges in the Kingdom of Mysore. The College of Engineering, Pune and College of Engineering Guindy were not able to accommodate enough students from Mysore, so there was a stark requirement of an Engineering College which would steer the industrialization of Mysore.

When Sir M Visvesvaraya became the diwan of Mysore, he proposed the creation of the University of Mysore which was created in 1916. This was the first university in the Kingdom, and it had two campuses at Mysore and Bangalore. The Mysore Campus offered courses in arts and culture and the Bangalore campus offered courses in Science and Engineering. Whilst Central College offered courses in Basic Sciences, Mathematics, the College of Engineering (UVCE) was the centre of excellence in Engineering.

The School of Mechanical Engineering was established in 1913, before the existence of the Engineering College. It offered certificate courses in Mechanical Engineering, and was directed by Prof. S. V. Shetty, an early aviation pioneer, who was the founding professor of the College of Engineering in 1917. The School of Mechanical Engineering became the Department of Mechanical Engineering of the College post 1920. K. R. Sheshachar, recipient of the Order of Gandabherunda, became the first principal of the institution. The college first started on 1 July 1917 with a strength of 45 students in the First Year Class. UVCE’s department of Electrical Engineering was the first electrical engineering department to be established in the country.

In the course of UVCE's history, its name has changed several times:

1. College of Engineering Bangalore (1917)
2. University College of Engineering (1925)
3. University Visvesvaraya College of Engineering (1971)
4. University of Visvesvaraya College of Engineering (2022)

== Campus ==
UVCE has two campuses in Bangalore. The main campus is located at Bangalore’s Central Business District in K. R. Circle, very close to the Vidhana Soudha. The City Campus has lots of heritage structures spread over 15 acres. It has the departments of Mechanical engineering, Electrical Engineering, Electronics and Communications and Computer Science Engineering.

The Departments of Civil and Architecture are situated at the Jnanabharati Campus of Bangalore University in Mysore Road, Bangalore. The college provides hostel facilities for boys and girls separately, both in the Jnanabharathi and K.R. Circle campus.

== Admissions ==
As UVCE is a public university, all admissions are strictly on merit basis. UG - Candidates who qualify in the Karnataka Common Entrance Test (KCET) conducted by the Government of Karnataka, are eligible for admission to the Undergraduate Engineering. Admission for Architecture is through NATA. Candidates belonging to Union Territories / other states are also admitted to the college under the Central Government quota.

PG - Candidates who qualify through GATE and PGCET are eligible to the Post Graduate programmes.

== Academics ==
UVCE offers UG, PG courses and PhD in the following Departments of Engineering and Architecture:

Dept of Mechanical Engineering

B.Tech - Mechanical Engineering

M.Tech - Machine Design, Manufacturing Science and Engineering, Thermal Science Engineering, Advanced Materials Technology

Dept of Electrical Engineering

B.Tech - Electrical and Electronics Engineering

M.Tech - Power Electronics, Control and Instrumentation, Power Engineering and Energy Systems

Dept of Electronics and Communications

B.Tech - Electronics and Communications

M.Tech - Electronics and Communications

Dept of Computer Sciences

B.Tech - Computer Sciences Engineering, Information Science Engineering, Artificial Intelligence and Data Sciences

M.Tech - Computer Sciences Engineering, Cybersecurity, Computer Networking, Web Technologies, Internet of Things, Information Technology.

Dept of Civil Engineering

B.Tech - Civil Engineering

M.Tech - Construction Technology, Geotechnical Engineering, Structural Engineering, Highway Engineering, Pre-Stressed Concrete, Water resources Engineering, Environment Engineering and Management, Earthquake Engineering.

Dept of Architecture

B.Arch - Architecture

== Student life ==
Training and Placement Office

Student Placement Coordinators run the Training and Placement Office UVCE under the guidance of a faculty Placement Officer. Placements at UVCE are run completely by a student-team who lead the management of placement drives.

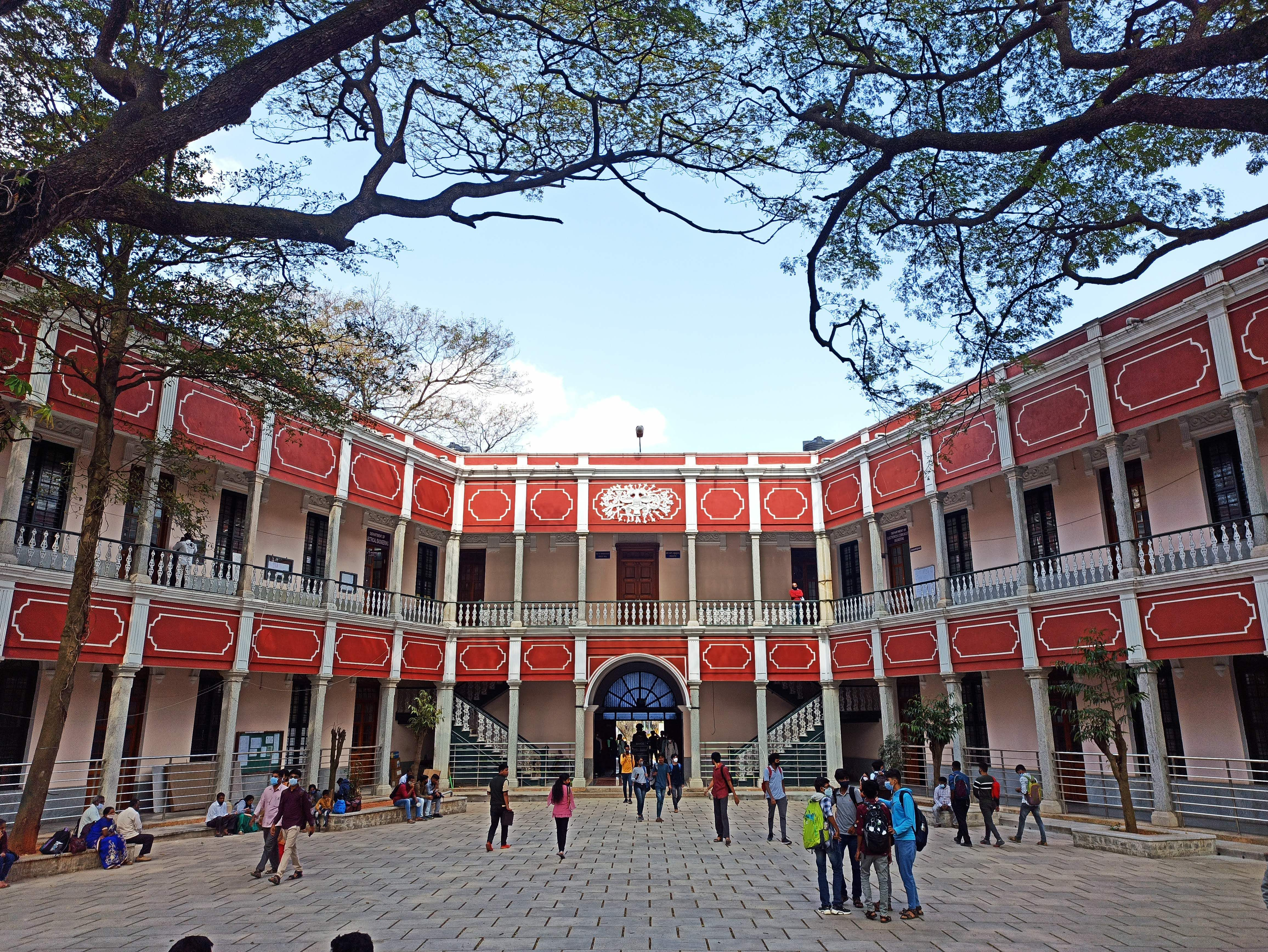
Wings of UVCE

MARVEL Makerspace

Makerspace for Advanced Research, Vital Education and Learning (MARVEL) is UVCE’s student-run makerspace. It was founded by students and alumni from the UVCE Graduates Association to host student upskilling programs in cutting-edge technologies and support student-led projects.

The makerspace is managed by a team of Student Coordinators who design skill-development courses and oversee its operations. The UVCE Graduates Association, which patronizes this makerspace, has provided critical infrastructure such as 3D printers, computers, and essential prototyping tools. They also actively support student-led initiatives.

UVCE Gymkhana

All cultural and sports activities of UVCE are governed by the UVCE Gymkhana, with several specialized clubs in it such as Eunoia-Fashion Club, Tatva-Drama Club, Paradox-Singing & Music Club, Momento-Dance Club, Chetana-Kannada Club, Vinimaya-Literary and Pop Culture Club, Pratibimbha-Fine Arts and Photography Club and G2C2-Environment Club.

Entrepreneurship Cell UVCE

E-Cell UVCE is a student association which engages with activities on entrepreneurship by hosting events, masterclasses and workshops from leading entrepreneurs, thereby driving the spirit of entrepreneurship at UVCE.

IEEE UVCE

This is a student chapter of IEEE at UVCE. IEEE UVCE hosts technical upskillment workshops, hackathons, paper and poster presentation fests and technical fests at UVCE.

Along with these clubs, they are niche clubs such as GDG UVCE, TEDxUVCE, 180DC UVCE(consulting club), HashCode UVCE etc which engage in diversifying students’ exposure to the world.

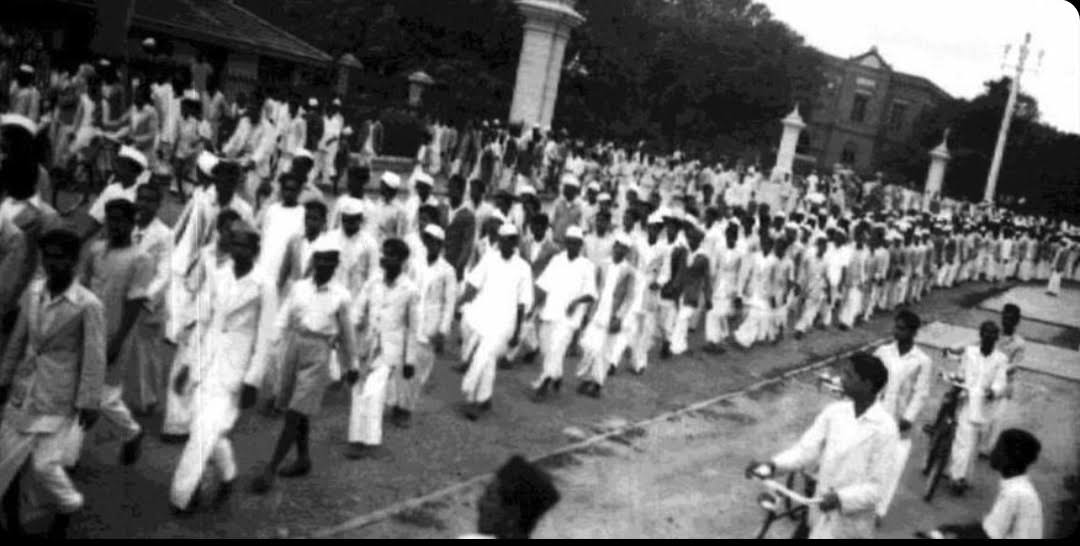
UVCE during Quit India Movement

== Alumni ==
UVCE, being one of the first engineering schools in India, has a network of alumni who have made it to the top in all walks of life.

- Dr M R Srinivasan, Padma Vibhushan, Padma Bhushan, Padma Shri, Nuclear Scientist, Former Chairman - Atomic Energy Commission
- Balu Balakrishnan, CEO of Power Integrations, Inventor (200+ US Patents)
- Dr Roddam Narasimha, Padma Vibhushan, Padma Bhushan, FRS, Aerospace and Fluid Dynamics Scientist, Former Director, CSIR - NAL
- Dr V K Aatre, Padma Vibhushan, Padma Bhushan, Former Head, DRDO
- Dr Prahlada Rama Rao, Padma Shri, Programme Director - Agni, Akash, Prithvi, Brahmos Missile Programme, DRDO, Ex Director DRDL, VC DIAT.
- Shatavadhani Ganesh, Padma Bhushan, Author, Avadhani
- Dr T S Prahlad, Padma Shri
- Dr N Sheshagiri, Former director-general of the National Informatics Centre
- Roopa Pai, Writer
- B R Manickam, Chief Architect - Vidhana Soudha
- N. Ahmed, Professor Emeritus, Electrical and Computer and Engineering, University of New Mexico
- B V Jagadeesh, Entrepreneur, Venture Capitalist, Philanthropist; Founder - Exodus Communications, Nutanix
- Naganand Doraswamy, Entrepreneur, Venture Capitalist
- Ramesh Arvind, Film Director, Actor
- H. G. Dattatreya, Wing Commander, Actor
- Prakash Belawadi, Actor
- Mano Murthy, Music Director, Composer.
- Venugopal K R, Former Principal UVCE and Vice Chancellor Bangalore University.
- Venkatesh K. R. Kodur, University professor at Michigan State University and a pioneer in structural fire design.
- Professor S. S. Iyengar, Ryder professor and director of Computer Science at Florida International University, Miami, Florida, USA
- Satish Nagarajaiah, Professor Civil Engineering at Rice University, Texas, USA, ASCE Nathan M. Newmark Medal Awardee
- Lakshmi Narayanan, Ex-CEO at Cognizant
- Katepalli R. Sreenivasan, Former Chairman, Mechanical Engineering, Yale University
- Vijaya Bhaskar, Composer
- Arvind Bhat, Badminton player
- G Guruswamy, NASA Principal Aerospace Scientist who pioneered computational aeroelasticity in 1978.
- Rajkumar Buyya, Redmond Barry Distinguished Professor and Director of the Cloud Computing and Distributed Systems (CLOUDS) Laboratory at the University of Melbourne

== IEEE Fellows from UVCE ==
- M A L Thathachar
- S. S. Iyengar
- Viktor Prasanna
- V. Prasad Kodali
- Vasudev Kalkunte Aatre
- Rajkumar Buyya
- Venugopal K R, Former Principal UVCE and Vice Chancellor Bangalore University, IEEE Fellow, ACM Distinguished Educator, for his contributions to "Computer Science and Electrical Engineering Education".
- N. Ahmed, 1985 "for his contributions to engineering education and digital signal processing."

== Alumni Associations ==
1. UVCE Centenary Foundation
2. UVCE Foundation
3. UVCE Graduates Association
4. UVCE Alumni Association
5. UVCE Architecture Alumni Association
