= S.V. Setty =

- Śrīrām Veṃkaṭasubbā Seṭṭi
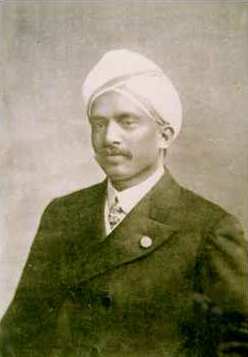
- S. Venkatasubba Setty
- Born: 28 December 1879; Mysore, Kingdom of Mysore, British India (Now Mysuru, Karnataka, India)
- Died: 12 October 1918 (aged 38); Bangalore
- Education: Faraday House, London; Thomason College; Maharaja's College
- Occupations: Aviator, professor
- Known for: Indian aviation pioneer
- Awards: Gold medal for General Proficiency in Aeronautics (1912)

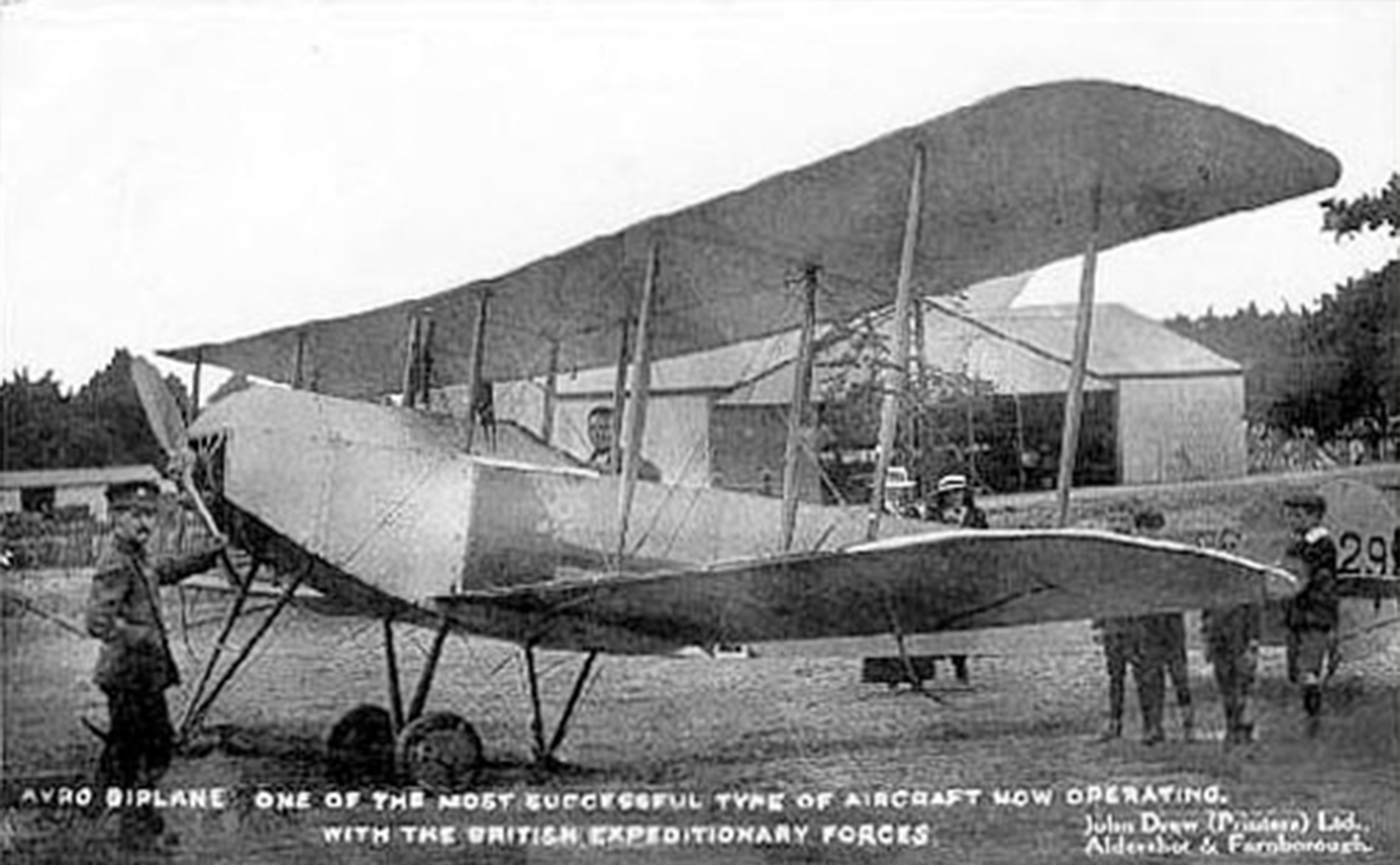
S.V. Setty (on right) and an Avro 500 biplane of Great War vintage in 1913

Sriram Venkatasubba Setty (IAST: Śrīrām Veṃkaṭasubbā Seṭṭi) popularly known as S.V. Setty (1879–1918) was an Indian aviator and professor from Mysore, Karnataka, India. He was known as the first Indian aviator, assisting with the design of the Avro 504.

S.V. Setty was also a founder professor of Karnataka's first engineering college, University Visvesvaraya College of Engineering, Bangalore.

== Early life and education ==
Setty was born on 12 December 1879, in Mysore. He graduated with a Bachelor of Arts degree from the Maharaja's College before enrolling in the engineering college at Guindy, Madras, Tamil Nadu. From Guindy, he transferred to Thomason College and then to Roorkee, where he completed his engineering degree.

In his early days, he worked in the Mysore Public Works Department as an assistant engineer until 1909. He won a scholarship from the Mysore government to Faraday House, London, where he studied for a diploma in electrical engineering. He gained practical experience at firms in Rugby, Wolverhampton and London. During this time, he also became an associate member of the Institution of Electrical Engineers.

== Aviation career ==
In May 1911, Setty joined A.V. Roe and Company (AVRO), at that time the only British company specializing in building aircraft in England. On 12 March 1912, he built an aircraft with some help and tested it. His first flight was successful, even at low power. John Robertson Duigan, impressed by the maiden trial flight, complimented Setty and he even concluded a deal with Avro. This aircraft was later named the Avro Duigan.

Setty's aircraft design then became the basis for Avro 500 series built by A. V. Roe. Later, in May 1912, he started designing a new biplane aircraft. The design was published in the Modern Review monthly magazine (July 1912, India), and it was different from the Avro 500. After completing its design, on 30 June 1912 he left for India, On 12 June 1912, Setty received a gold medal by A. V. Roe for General Proficiency in Aeronautics.

After Setty left for India, Avro released the 500 series of aircraft, including the Avro 501, 502, 503 and 504. All of these, except the Avro 504, were similar to Avro 500 aircraft in basic design. The new biplane aircraft which Setty had designed turned out to be Avro 504, a popular World War I bomber. The Avro 504 evolved into the world's first trainer aircraft, In November 1914, the Avro 504 was the first aircraft to bomb Germany in the war. Setty designed the Avro Duigan which became the model for Avro 500 and then designed the new biplane the Avro 504.

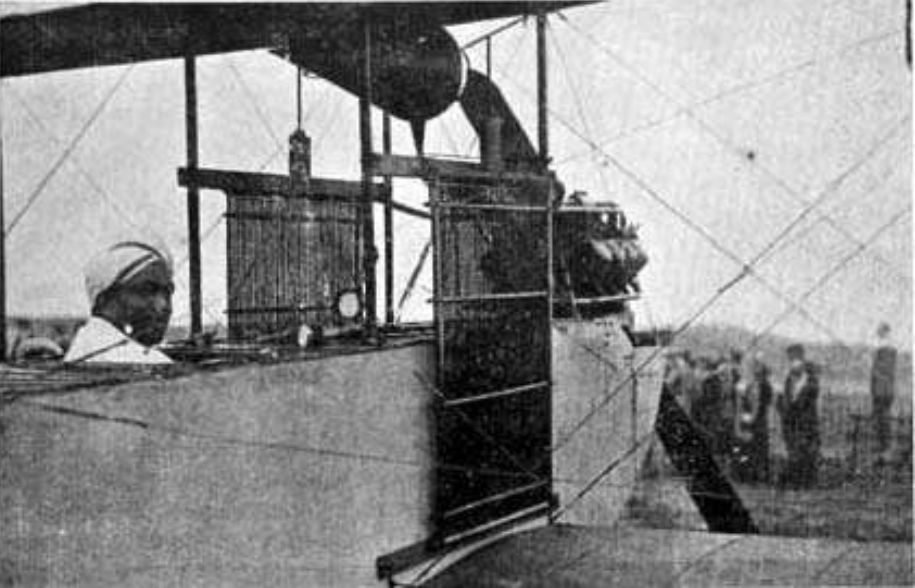
Setty in his Avro

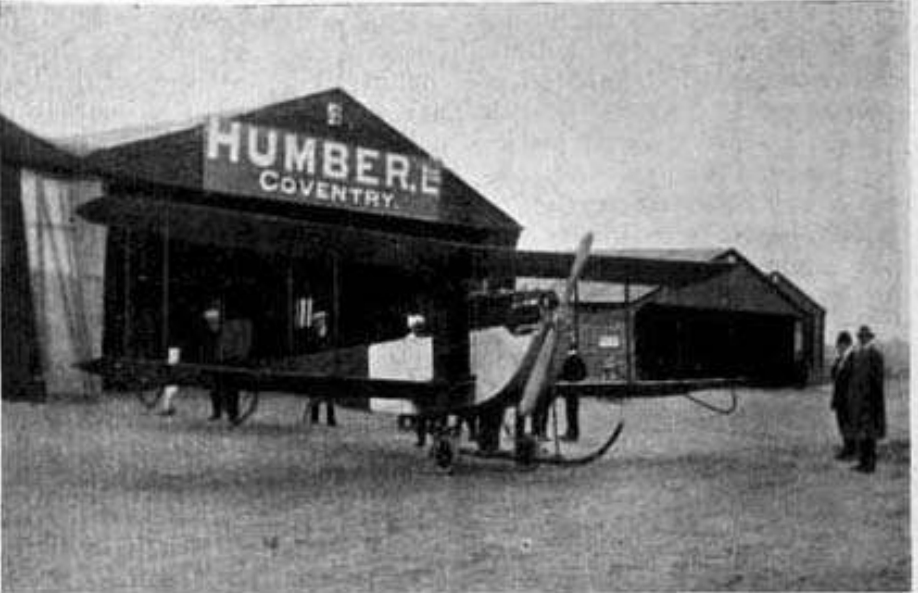
In the hangar

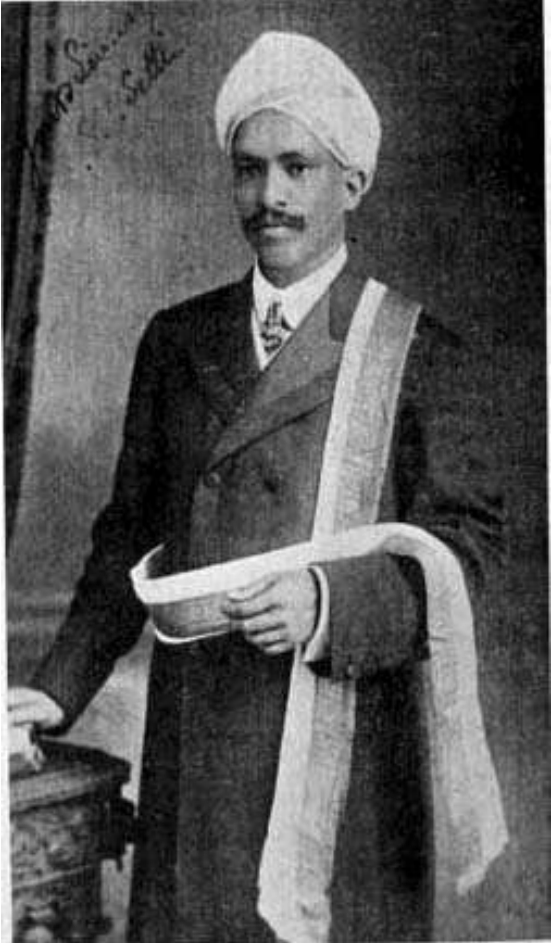
Portrait c. 1912

== Later years ==
In 1913, a technical school was established in Bangalore in a shed-like structure headed by S.V. Setty as the superintendent, after his return from England. He became a founder professor of Karnataka's first engineering college, University Visvesvaraya College of Engineering, Bangalore.

== Death ==
The 1918 influenza epidemic killed about a fifth of Bangalore's residents, including Setty, his wife, and one of their four daughters. He died on 12 October 1918 at the age of 38.
