= V. K. Aatre =

Indian Scientist

Vasudev Kalkunte Aatre

8 th Director General of Defence research and development organisation
- In office 1999–2004
- Preceded by: APJ Abdul Kalam
- Succeeded by: M Natarajan

Personal details
- Born: 1939 (age 86–87) Bangalore, British India
- Citizenship: India
- Education: UVCE; University of Waterloo, Canada; Indian Institute of Science

Vasudev Kalkunte Aatre (born 1939) is an Indian scientist and former head of the Defence Research and Development Organisation (DRDO), India's premier defence research and development organization. In that capacity, he also served as the Scientific Advisor to the Minister of Defence (Raksha Mantri). He is a recipient of the Padma Vibhushan award.

== Biography ==
Aatre was born in 1939 in Bangalore. He completed his BE in electrical engineering from University of Visvesvaraya College of Engineering (UVCE), Bangalore, then part of University of Mysore in 1961 and a master's degree from the Indian Institute of Science (IISc), Bangalore, in 1963. He was awarded a PhD in electrical engineering from the University of Waterloo, Canada, in 1967. Thereafter, he worked as a professor of electrical engineering at the Technical University of Nova Scotia, Halifax, Canada, until 1980. He was a visiting professor at IISc till 1977. He is a former member of the Defence Research & Development Service (DRDS).

In 1980, Aatre joined DRDO at the Naval Physical & Oceanographic Laboratory (NPOL), Cochin, and became its director in 1984. He was later appointed as chief controller (R&D) of DRDO. In February 2000, he replaced Abdul Kalam as the director general of DRDO and SA to RM, serving as scientific advisor to the then Defence Minister, George Fernandes. He retired in October 2004 and was replaced by Dr. M. Natrajan.

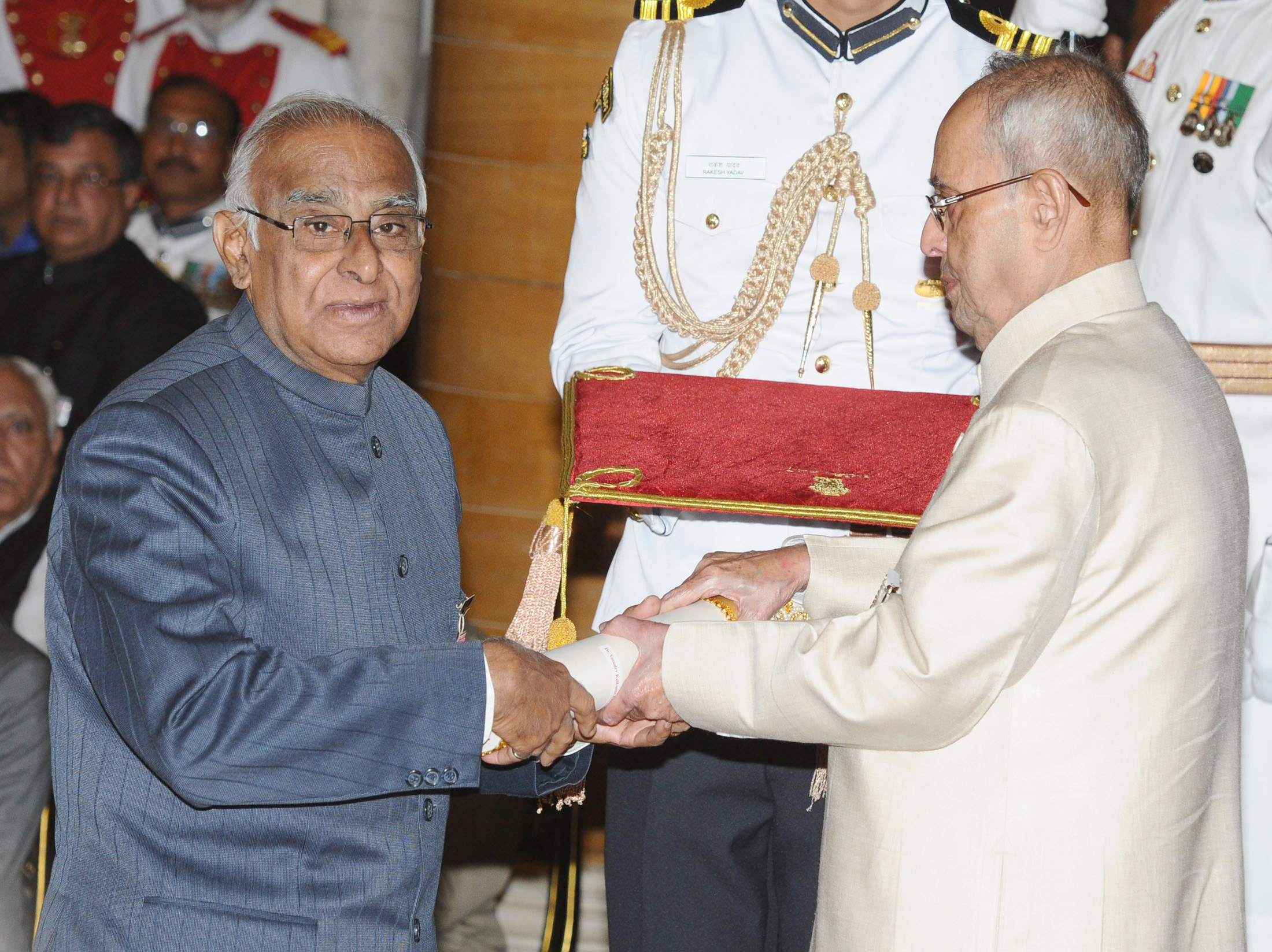
The President, Shri Pranab Mukherjee presenting the Padma Vibhushan Award to Dr. Vasudev Kalkunte Aatre, at a Civil Investiture Ceremony, at Rashtrapati Bhavan, in New Delhi on April 12, 2016

Aatre was awarded the Padma Bhushan award in 2000 by the then President K. R. Narayanan. He was bestowed with the Padma Vibhushan award, India's second highest civilian award in 2016. He is now chairman of NIT Goa and IIEST SHIBPUR, Howrah.

In 2015, Karnataka Science and Technology awarded him with the academy's Lifetime Achievement Award for 2014.

== See also ==
- List of University of Waterloo people
