= Hemmige =

Hemmige Hemambika pura
- village
- Location in Karnataka, India Hemmige (India)
- Coordinates: 12.363°N 76.08°E
- Country: India
- State: Karnataka
- District: Mysore

Languages
  - Official: Kannada
- Time zone: UTC+5:30 (IST)
- PIN: 571122
- Telephone code: 08227
- Vehicle registration: KA-09

Hemmige is a small village near Mysore, in Sringeri taluk, Karnataka, India. It is also the community name with many natives having Hemmige as theiir surname.

== Notable residents ==
- Sundaraja Sitharama Iyengar
