= Prahlada Rama Rao =

Indian defence research scientist and engineer

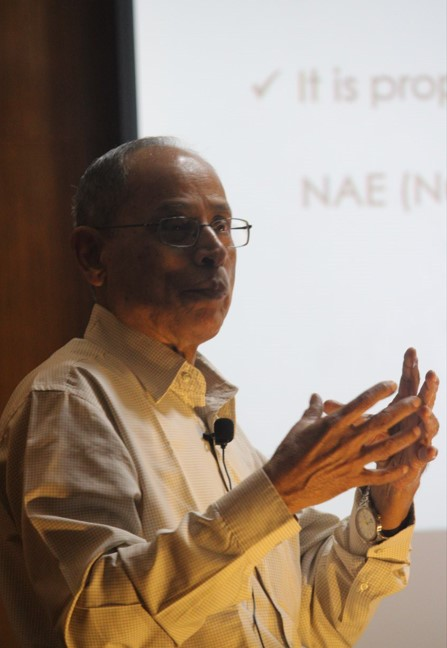
- Prahlada Rama Rao at UVCE
- Born: February 5, 1947 (age 79); Bangalore Mysore State(modern-day Karnataka, India)
- Education: University of Visvesvaraya College of Engineering; Indian Institute of Science
- Occupation: Missile designer
- Years active: 1971-2015
- Known for: Akash missile
- Awards: Padma Shri; National Aeronautical Prize; Sivananda Eminent Citizen Award; DRDO Award; Eminent Engineers Award; HMA Life Time Achievement Award

Prahlada Rama Rao is an Indian aerospace engineer who served as the former director of Defence Research and Development Laboratory (DRDL), the largest of the Defence Research and Development Organization (DRDO) laboratories in India, known for his contributions to the Indian space programme. He was honoured by the Government of India in 2015 with the Padma Shri, the fourth-highest Indian civilian award. He was vice chancellor of the Defence Institute of Advanced Technology from 2011 to 2014.

== Early life and education ==
Prahlada was born on 5 February 1947 in Bangalore in the Princely state of Mysore of India. He graduated in mechanical engineering from University of Visvesvaraya College of Engineering which was affiliated with Bangalore University in 1969, and obtained a master's degree in aeronautical engineering from the Indian Institute of Science, with rockets and missile systems as his major. He pursued his research at the Jawaharlal Nehru Technological University, Hyderabad, where he earned a doctoral degree (PhD).

== Career ==
He started his career with the Government of India in 1971 and has served several space and defence organizations such as Vikram Sarabhai Space Centre (VSSC) in Thiruvananthapuram and Aeronautical Development Establishment (ADE) in Bengaluru before joining the Defence Research and Development Laboratory (DRDL) in Hyderabad as its director in 1997, a post he held till 2005. During this period, he also served as the chairman of the Integrated Guided Missile Development Program (IGDMP). In 2005, Prahlada moved to DRDO headquarters as the Chief Controller Research and Development with the additional responsibility of the Chief Controller for Aeronautical Cluster of laboratories of the organization.

He was appointed, in 2011, as vice chancellor of the Defence Institute of Advanced Technology, a deemed university based in Pune and run by the Ministry of Defence and served there until his superannuation in February 2015. He holds the post of an adjunct professor at the Indian Institute of Science at its Department of Aerospace and the Department of Management Studies.

== Positions ==
Prahlada is a former president of Hyderabad Management Association during 2003–2004 and is reported to have organized a year-long Lecture series titled India - My Dream where eminent personalities were invited to deliver key lectures. He held the presidency of the World Congress on Disaster Management on two occasions, in 2008 and 2010. He is a former chairman of the Hyderabad chapters of the Indian Society for Advancement of Materials and Process Engineering (ISAMPE), the Indian Society for Nondestructive Testing (ISNT) and the Indian Academy of Engineering (INAE) and is a former president of the Society for Aerospace Quality and Reliability (SAQR). He is a donor member of the Alumni Association of the Indian Institute of Science and a managing trustee of the Trust for Advancement of Aerodynamics of India. He is also a member of the Confederation of Indian Industries (CII), the National Committee on Higher Education, the Ministry of Human Resource Development (MHRD) Task Force on Institution Mechanism and Sector Innovation Council, and the Federation of Indian Chambers of Commerce and Industry (FICCI) National Committee on Science and Technology. He sits on the editorial board of the Indian journal Indian Strategic.

== Legacy ==
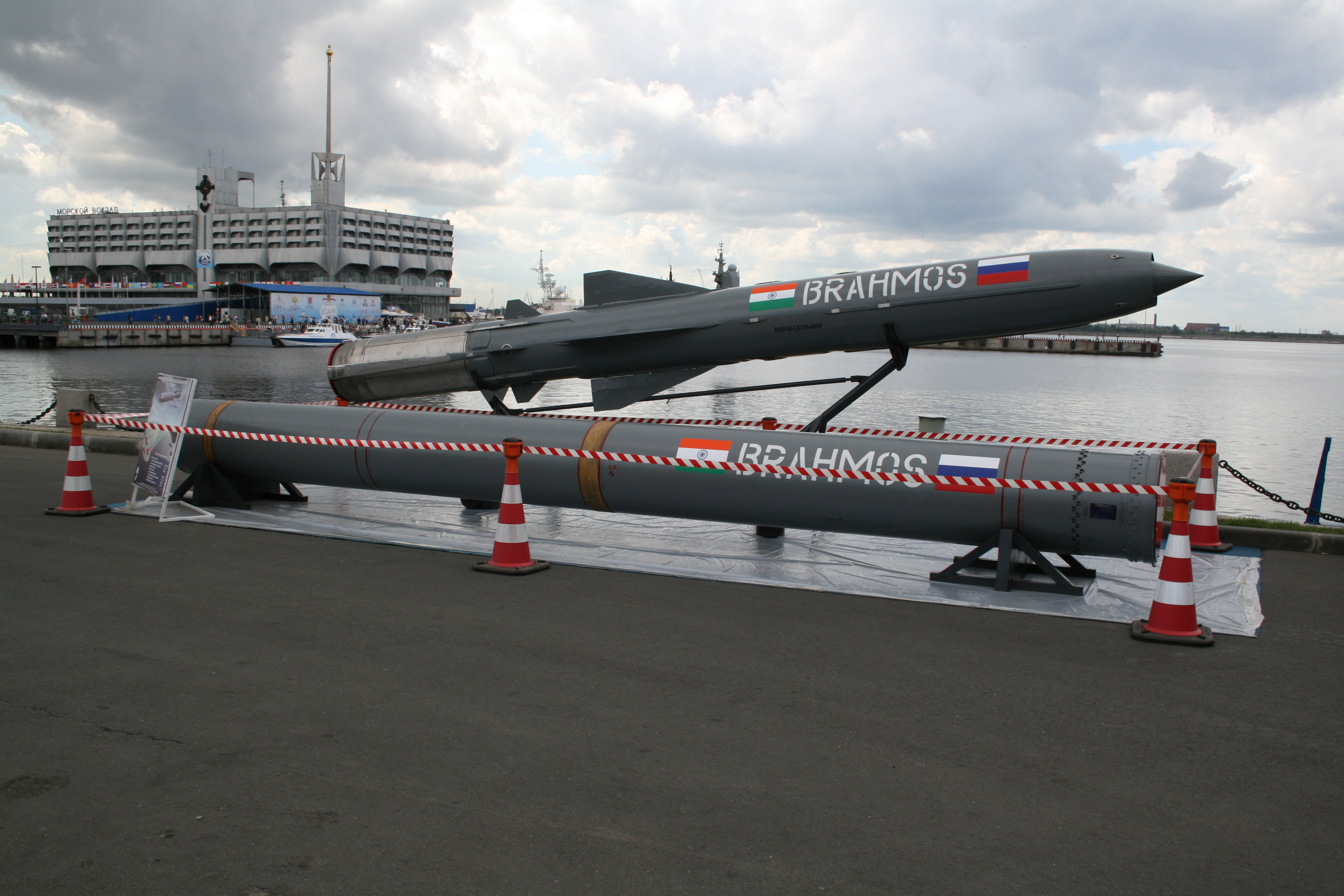
Prahlada was Program Director of the BrahMos missile project

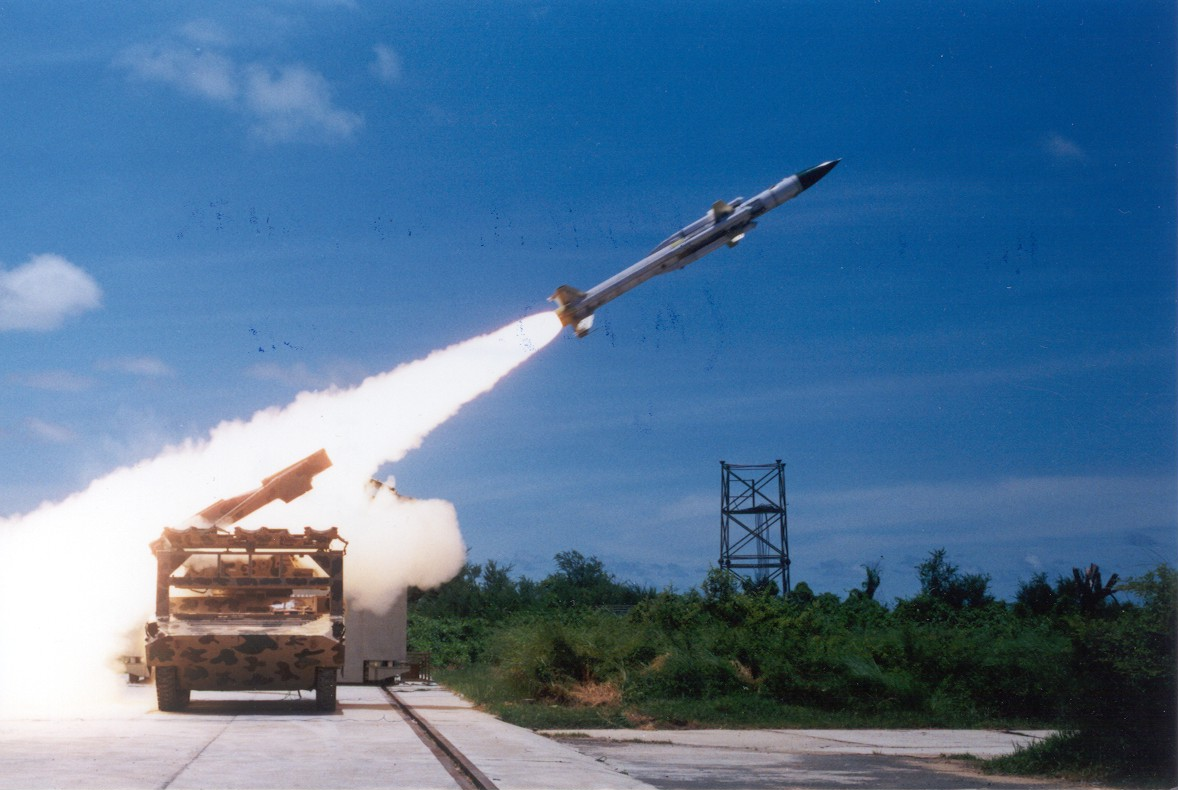
Akash missile

The Integrated Guided Missile Development Program, during Prahlada's tenure as its chairman, is reported to have developed several key technologies for the Indian space programme related to rocket propulsion, onboard avionics, missile systems, radar systems, and hypersonic flight vehicles. He is also known to have contributed to the establishment of Compact Antenna Test Range, Structural Dynamic Test Centre, Supersonic Ramjet Engine Test facility, Subsonic Ramjet Engine Test facility, 6 Component Rocket Motor Test facility, Computer Integrated Tomography, Computational Fluid Dynamics Centre, Shock Tube facility, High Temperature Material Characterization Facility, High Temperature Structural Testing and Missile System Simulation Centre for Indian Space Research Organization. He has served as the project head for Akash, a surface to air missile system and as the chief designer of many other Indian missile systems viz. Prithvi, Agni and Nag.

It was during Prahlada's tenure as the director, Defence Research and Development Laboratory initiated projects such as Astra air to air missile system and Long Range Surface to air missile system for Naval application. He was involved with the project formulation, management and trials of BrahMos Supersonic cruise missile system and submarine launched long range ballistic missile system as programme director. His contributions are also reported in the formulation of Defence Procurement Procedures 2006 and 2008. His tenure at DRDO also witnessed commercialization of DRDO technologies by the organization with assistance from FICCI. As the vice chancellor of Defence Institute of Advanced Technology (DIAT), he was involved in introducing courses in subjects such as Technology Management, Biosciences and Defence Electronics Systems under the newly formed Department of Bioscience and Technology. DIAT was upgraded as a Category A University during his term there.

== Awards and recognitions ==
Prahlada is a fellow of several Indian institutions and professional bodies such as Andhra Pradesh Academy of Sciences, Indian National Academy of Engineering, Institution of Engineers, Society for Shock Wave Research of India, Astronautical Society of India, Systems Society of India, Institution of Electronics and Telecommunication Engineers and Aeronautical Society of India. He was conferred the doctoral degree (honoris causa) by Sri Venkateswara University in 2006 and by the Jawaharlal Nehru Technological University, Anantapur in 2012. He is a recipient of awards and honours such as DRDO Scientist of the Year, HMA – Member of the Year, IISc Distinguished Alumnus Award, Sivananda Eminent Citizen Award and Hyderabad Management Association Life Time Achievement Award. He has also received National Aeronautical Prize, 2008 DRDO Award and Eminent Engineers Award.

=== Indian governmental honours ===
- 2015 – Padma Shri, India's fourth-highest civilian award.

== See also ==
- Defence Institute of Advanced Technology
- Defence Research and Development Laboratory
- Defence Research and Development Organization
- Integrated Guided Missile Development Program
- Indian Institute of Science
- Akash (missile)
- Prithvi (missile)
- Agni (missile)
- Nag (missile)
- Astra (missile)
- BrahMos
