= Jabalpur Engineering College =

Technical University in India

- Former names: Government Engineering College, Jabalpur
- Motto: Onwards on wings
- Type: Government
- Established: 1947; 79 years ago
- Founders: Dr. S. P. Chakravarti (Founding Principal)
- Chairperson: Inder Singh Parmar (Minister of Technical Education)
- Principal: Dr. Rajeev Chandak
- Location: Jabalpur, Madhya Pradesh, India
- Campus: Urban 255 acres (103 ha)
- Website: www.jecjabalpur.ac.in

Jabalpur Engineering College (JEC) is an institute located in Jabalpur, Madhya Pradesh, India. It is the oldest technical institution in central India and the 15th-oldest in India. It is the first institute of India to have started the Electronics & Telecommunication engineering education in the country, and also the last educational institution to be set up by the British in India. The Government of Madhya Pradesh is in the process of converting it into a Technical University.

== History ==
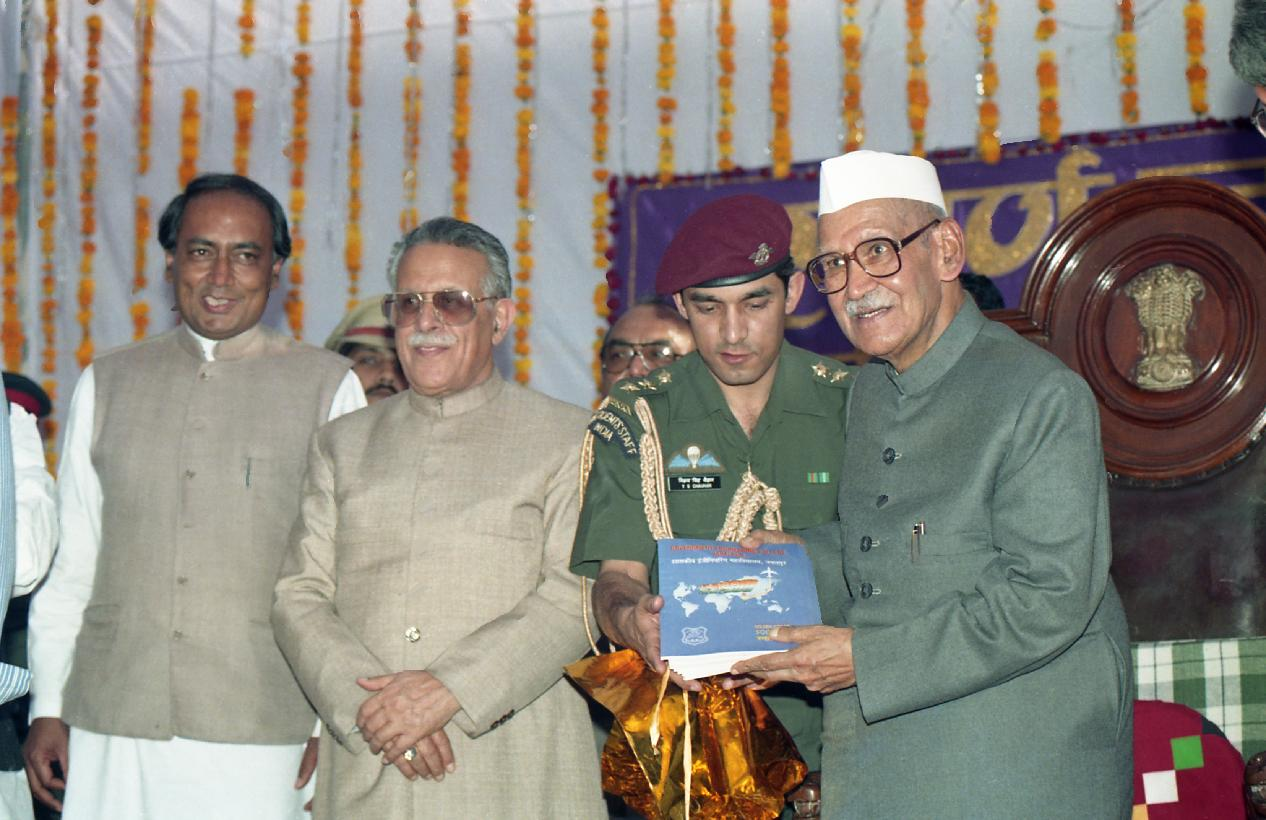
President of India at the Golden Jubilee function of JEC, along with the Governor and the Chief Minister of Madhya Pradesh

JEC was established as the Government Engineering College (GEC), Jabalpur, on 7 July 1947, during the British rule in India. It was inaugurated by the then Minister for Education of the Central Provinces, S. V. Gokhale. It started functioning from the existing building of Robertson College, Jabalpur, which was constructed in the year 1916. The building now houses the Civil engineering department of JEC, and Robertson College has been shifted to its present and permanent campus in Pachpedi. Dr. S. P. Chakravarti, the then Head of the Electrical engineering department of Indian Institute of Science (IISc), Bangalore, was appointed as its first Principal.

JEC is the first institute of India to award B.E. in Electronics & Telecommunication engineering, which it is offering since 1947, the first institute of India to award M.E. in Microwave engineering, Radio & UHF engineering, VHF & Carrier Telephone engineering, and High Voltage engineering, which it is offering since 1953, and the first institute of India to award PhD in Advanced Electronics, which it is offering since 1955. JEC is the first institute of Madhya Pradesh to introduce BTech in Artificial Intelligence & Data Science, and Mechatronics, and MTech in Defence technology. It has installed the first TV transmitter of India, and the first HV laboratory of India. Madhya Pradesh's second Global Skills Park is being established at JEC over an area of 16 acres.

The Silver Jubilee ceremony of the institute was celebrated in 1972, in the presence of the then Education Minister of Madhya Pradesh, Arjun Singh. The institute celebrated its 50th anniversary in 1997, while the President of India, Dr. Shankar Dayal Sharma, Governor of Madhya Pradesh, Mohammad Shafi Qureshi and the Chief Minister of Madhya Pradesh, Digvijaya Singh, graced the Golden Jubilee ceremony. The Platinum Jubilee year was inaugurated by the Chief Minister of Madhya Pradesh, Shivraj Singh Chouhan, Technical Education Minister of Madhya Pradesh, Yashodhara Raje Scindia, and the Minister in-charge of Jabalpur, Gopal Bhargava, on 7 July 2021.

It was funded since its inception by the Government of India, until the creation of the new state of Madhya Pradesh. It was affiliated since its inception to the University of Sagar, until the creation of the University of Jabalpur, and then to the State Technological University of Madhya Pradesh. In 1997, it was granted an autonomous institute status. In 2026, the Government of Madhya Pradesh approved the restructuring of RGPV into three separate universities, with JEC being converted into the Mahakaushal University of Technology and Skills, under which all institutions in the Jabalpur, Rewa, Sagar, and Shahdol divisions will come.

== Academics ==
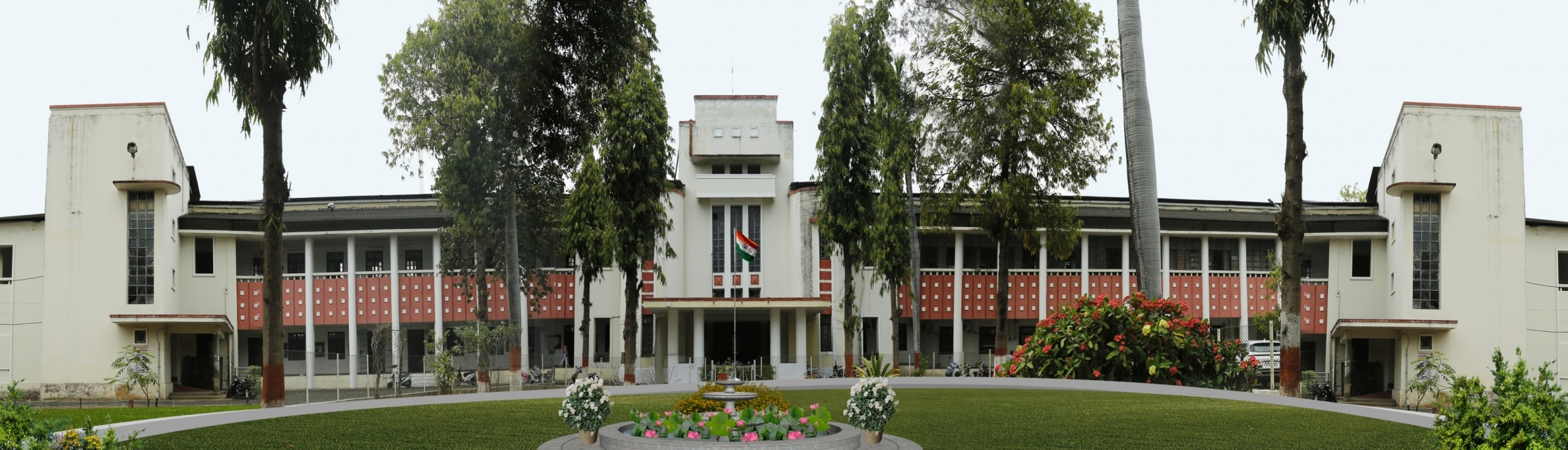
Jabalpur Engineering College (JEC)'s administrative building

=== Departments ===
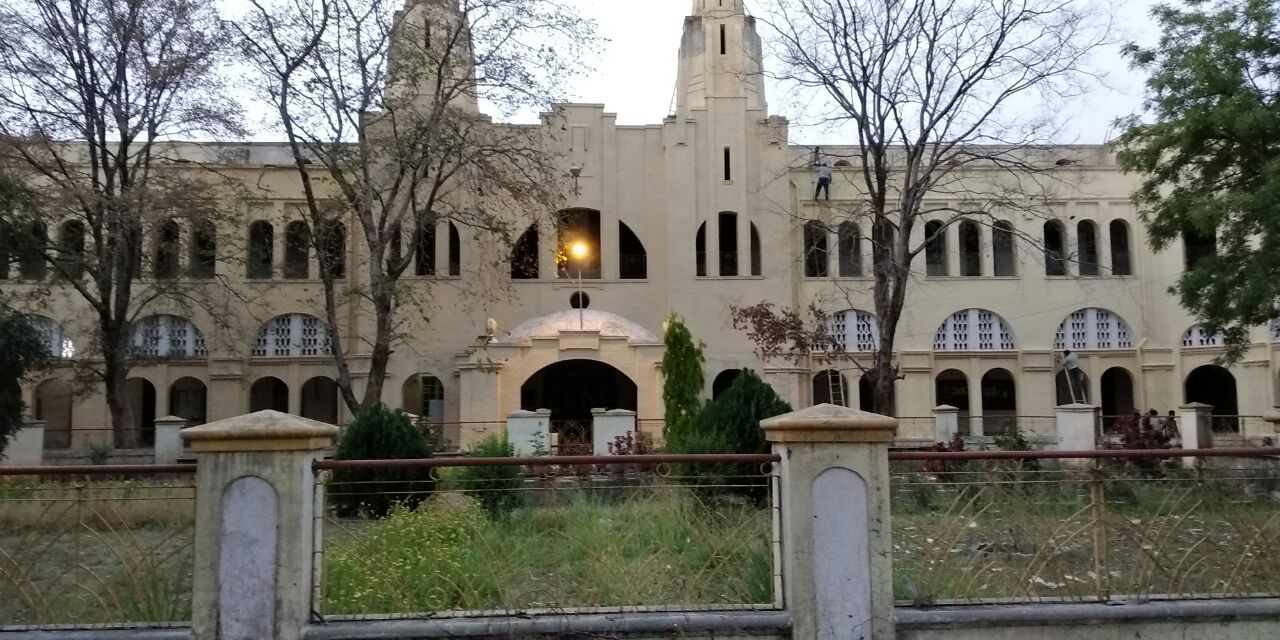
Civil engineering department, built in the year 1916

- Artificial Intelligence & Data Science
- Mechatronics Engineering
- Civil Engineering
- Electrical Engineering
- Mechanical Engineering
- Electronics & Telecommunications
- Computer Science & Engineering
- Information Technology
- Industrial & Production Engineering
- Department of Humanities
- Department of Applied Physics
- Department of Applied Chemistry
- Department of Applied Mathematics

The institute offers bachelor's, master's and doctoral degrees in engineering and applied sciences.

JEC made an announcement in March 2013, that it is starting new courses in engineering like Aerospace engineering, Automotive engineering, Biomedical engineering, Chemical engineering, Marine engineering, Materials science, Neuroscience, Nanotechnology, Nanoelectronics, besides Master of Business Administration, Master of Design, Architecture, Town planning and Pharmacy.

JEC has an academic collaboration with IIT Indore, where 50 students from JEC, complete their final-year studies at IIT Indore.

=== Admissions ===
- B.E. / BTech – Admissions are carried out on the basis of performance in Joint Entrance Examination – Main.
- M.E. / MTech – through Graduate Aptitude Test in Engineering (GATE).
- MCA – through MP Pre-MCA examination, conducted by Madhya Pradesh Professional Examination Board.
- MSc – Every year, 15 seats are allotted for the respective departments i.e. Physics, Mathematics and Chemistry. Selection is purely based on the percentage obtained in BSc degree examination, minimum expectation is 50% for the eligibility. Departments may conduct a selection test if the number of applicants exceeds 15.
- PhD – through Graduate Aptitude Test in Engineering (GATE), followed by written test and Interview.

=== Accreditation ===
All the courses are approved by the All India Council for Technical Education, recognised by the Directorate of Technical Education, Madhya Pradesh, and accredited by the National Board of Accreditation.

== Projects ==
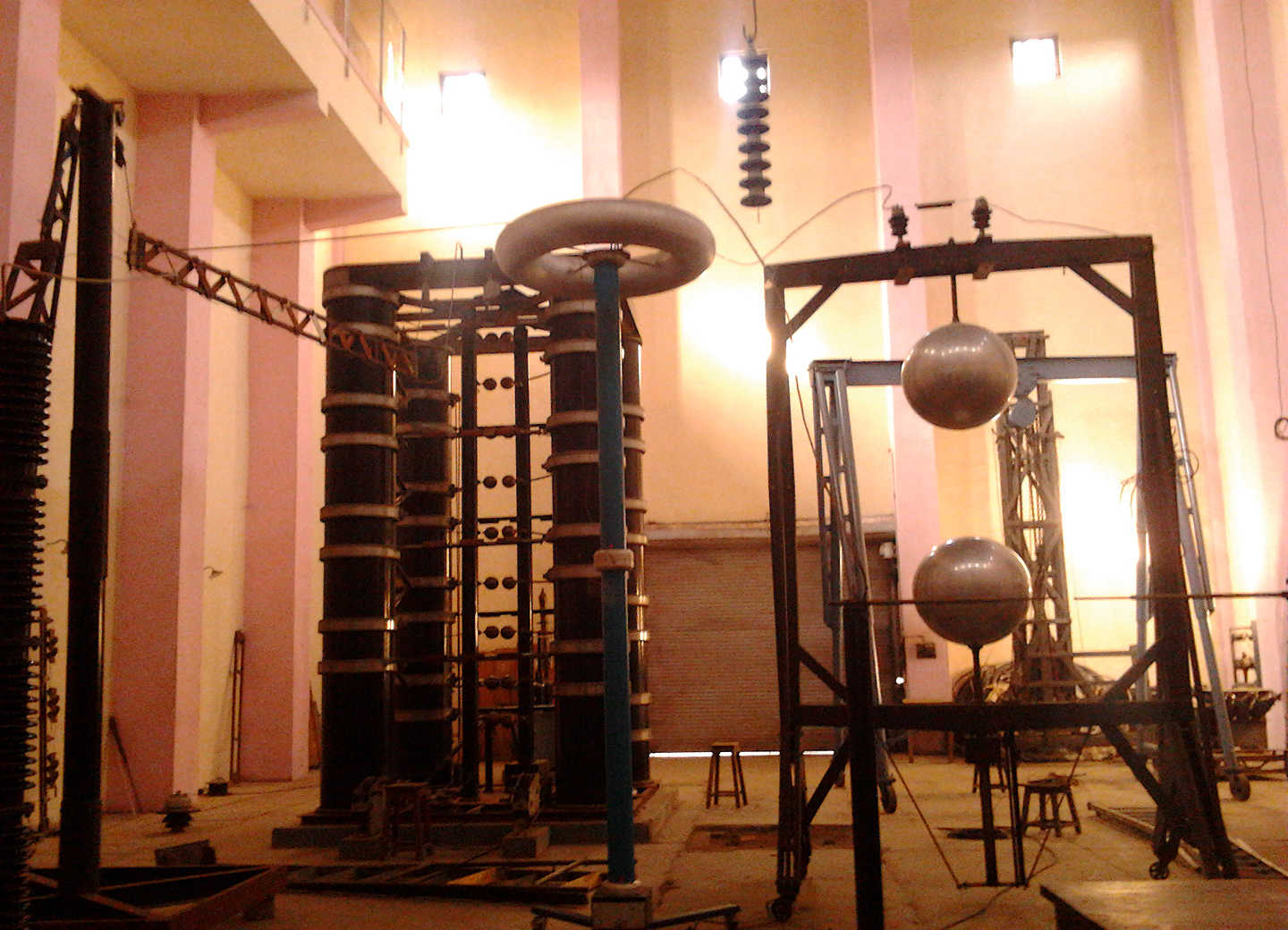
1.6 million volt impulse generator at the High Voltage Lab, is the largest and oldest in Indian academic institutes

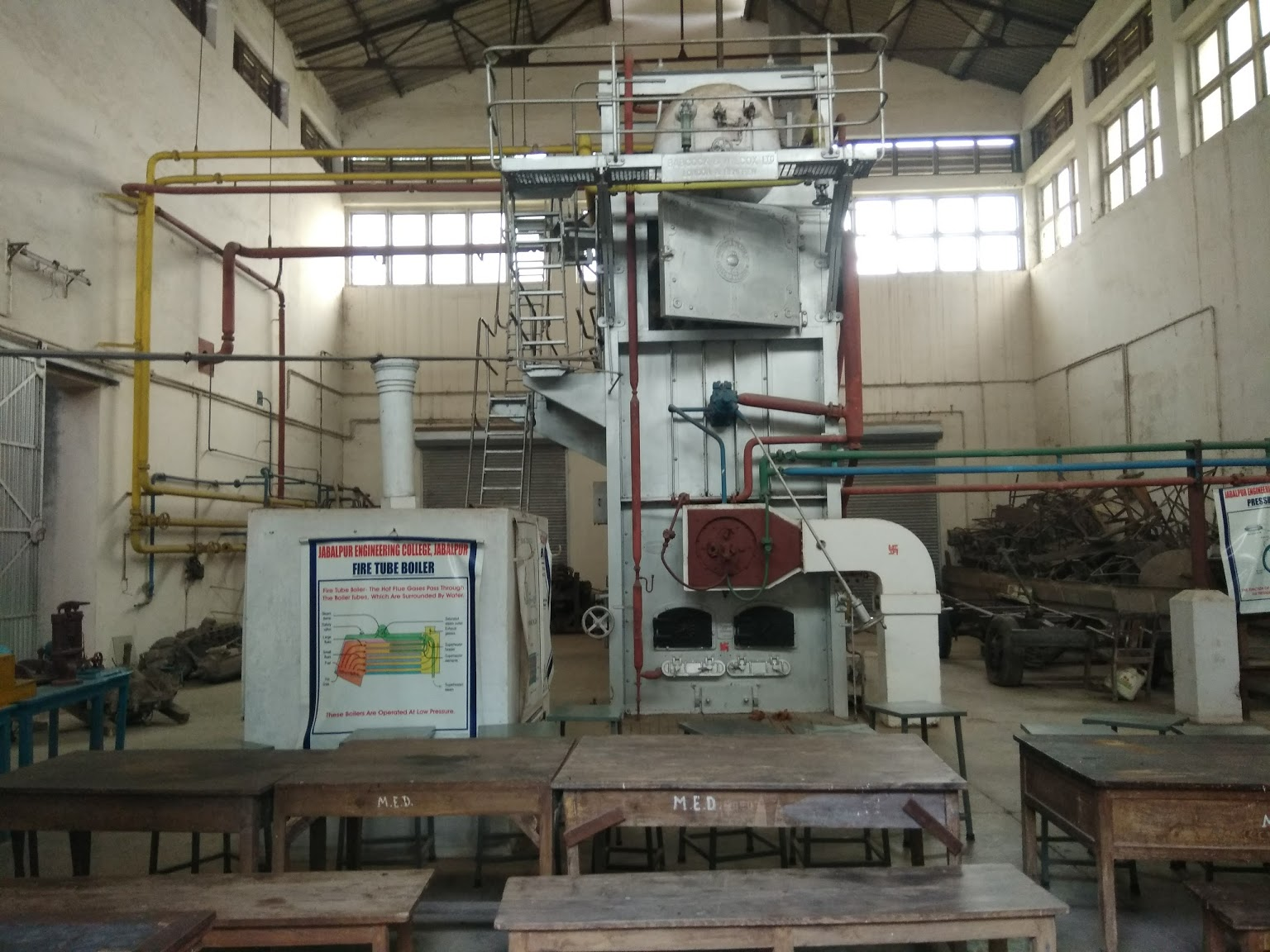
Fire-tube boiler of Mechanical engineering department

The ongoing projects at JEC:

- CORE (Centre of Relevance & Excellence) by TIFAC (Department of Science & Technology, Govt. of India)
- CIIILP (Canada-India Institute Industry Linkage Project)
- Indo-Italian Research project
- DSP Lab, Texas Instruments
- Sun Microsystems Training Centre
- Cisco Regional Academy of Networking Programme
- Centre for National & Academic Networking for Continuing Education with AICTE
- Renewable Energy Park – Govt. of India
- Centre of Fuzzy Logic System by Govt. of India
- Microzonation of selected cities of India by Geological Survey of India
- Research Project of Robotics & Manufacturing, Ministry of Science & Technology
- Software Technology Park of India, 2 MBPS HSDC Node, Ministry of Information Technology
- Fuller Energy Awards (State level) Selection
- M.P. Chamber consultancy clinic of Katni with MPCON
- Mini Tool Room, Ministry of Commerce & Industries, Government of India
- ERNET- AICTE Facility for Distance Learning & Digital Library
- Remote Sensing Resource Centre, Indian Space Research Organisation (ISRO)
- MOUs signed with national & international organisations e.g. Infosys, Wipro, TCS, IBM, Cisco etc., for promoting training of students.
- STA (State Technical Agency) and Remote Sensing Centre of Prime Minister's Rural Road Project – Govt. of India

== Campus ==
JEC campus

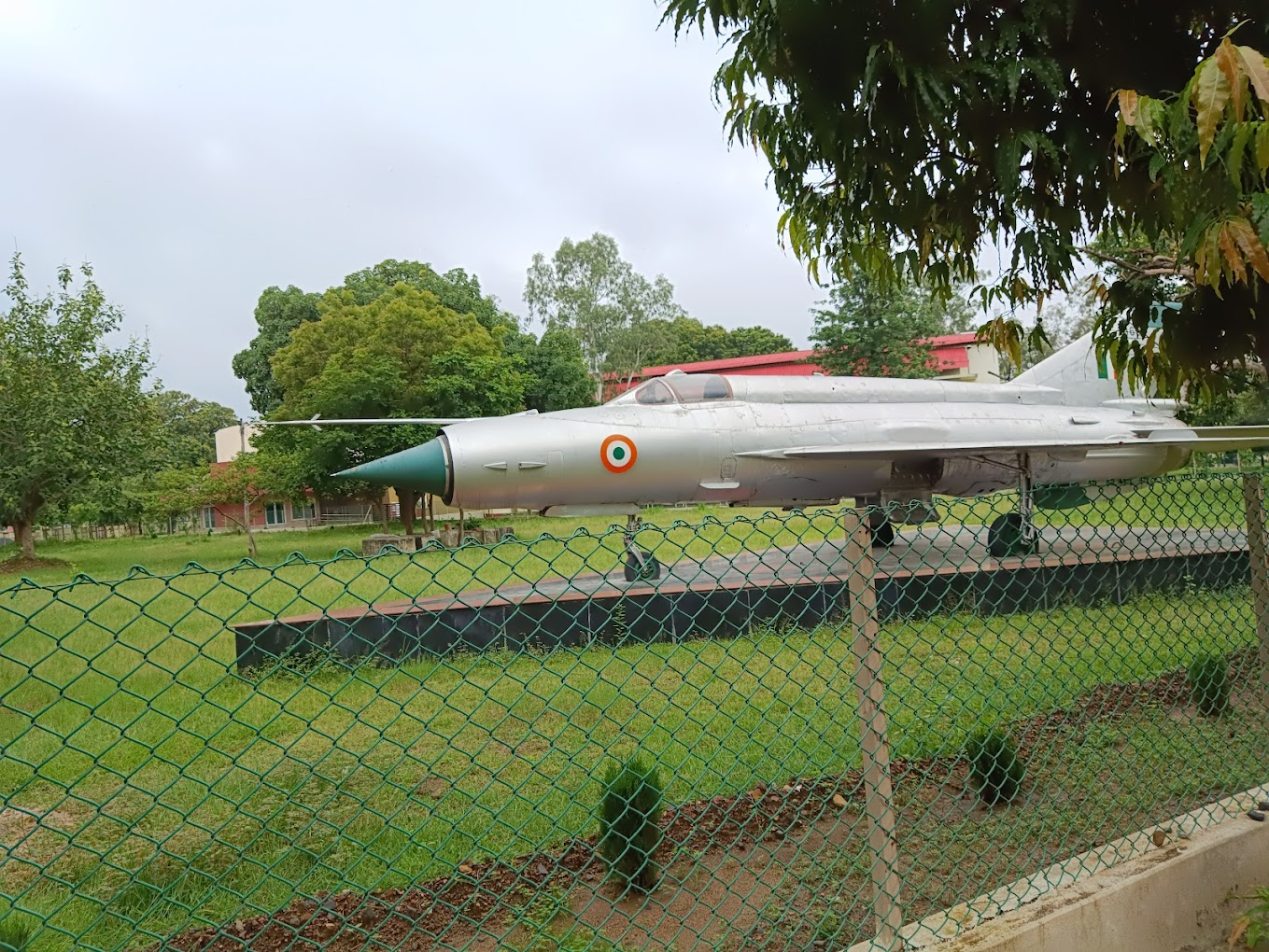
MiG-21 Supersonic Fighter Jet

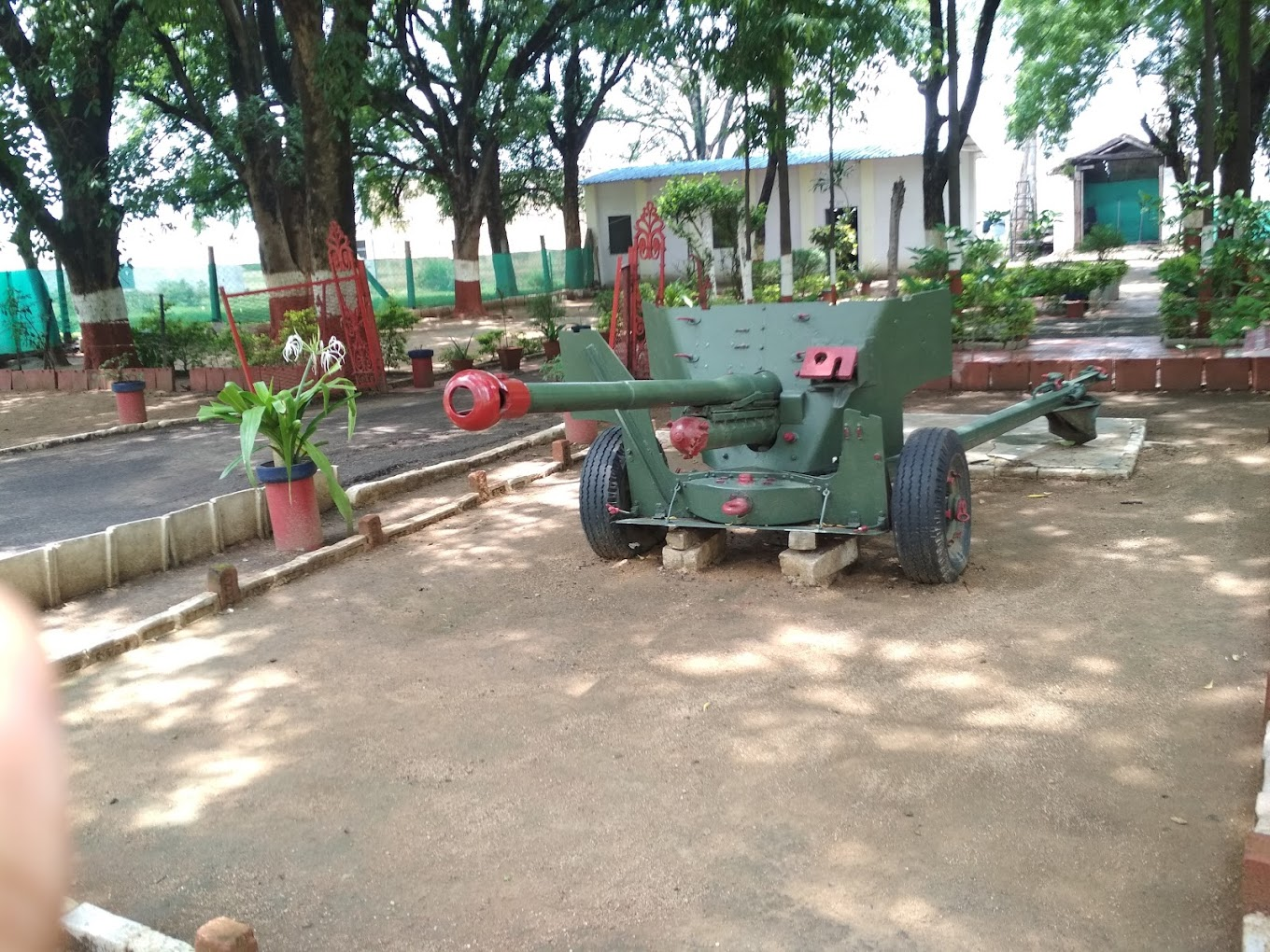
105 mm Indian Field Gun

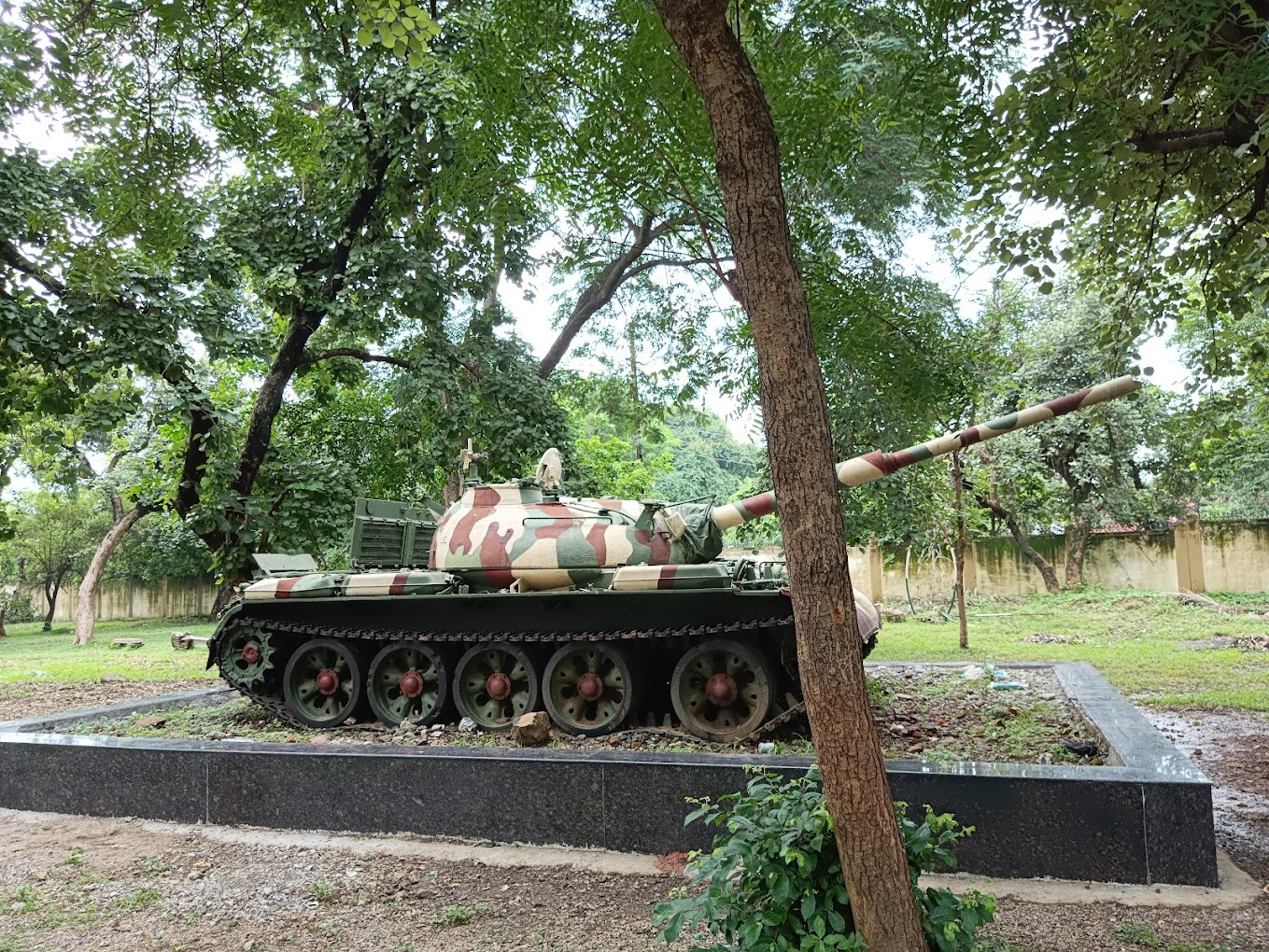
T-55 Main Battle Tank

JEC has been developed as a small township, centred around Gokalpur and Ranjhi. It has a lush green campus of 255 acres (1.03 km^{2}), rich in flora and fauna, with Robertson lake as a background, which is used for Marine engineering. JEC is the only educational institute of India to house a supersonic fighter jet, main battle tank, naval warship, howitzer and missile on its campus. It is due the presence of large defence engineering establishments in Jabalpur, such as the Indian Ordnance Factories. The sporting facilities include a stadium, athletic tracks, cricket, football and hockey fields, basketball, badminton, tennis and volleyball courts. A multi-station gymnasium, olympic-size swimming pool, amphitheatre, having a capacity of 3000, two auditoriums, an on-campus college dispensary, banking and postal facilities, National Cadet Corps & National Service Scheme regional centres, alumni centre, common rooms for both girls and boys, Centre for Incubation, Design and Innovation, Central Computing Facility, Central Computerised Library, Central Workshop. The campus is well connected to the city, being 13 km from the Jabalpur Airport, 6 km away from the Jabalpur Railway Station, and 9 km from the Jabalpur Bus Stand.

== Student life ==
=== Housing ===
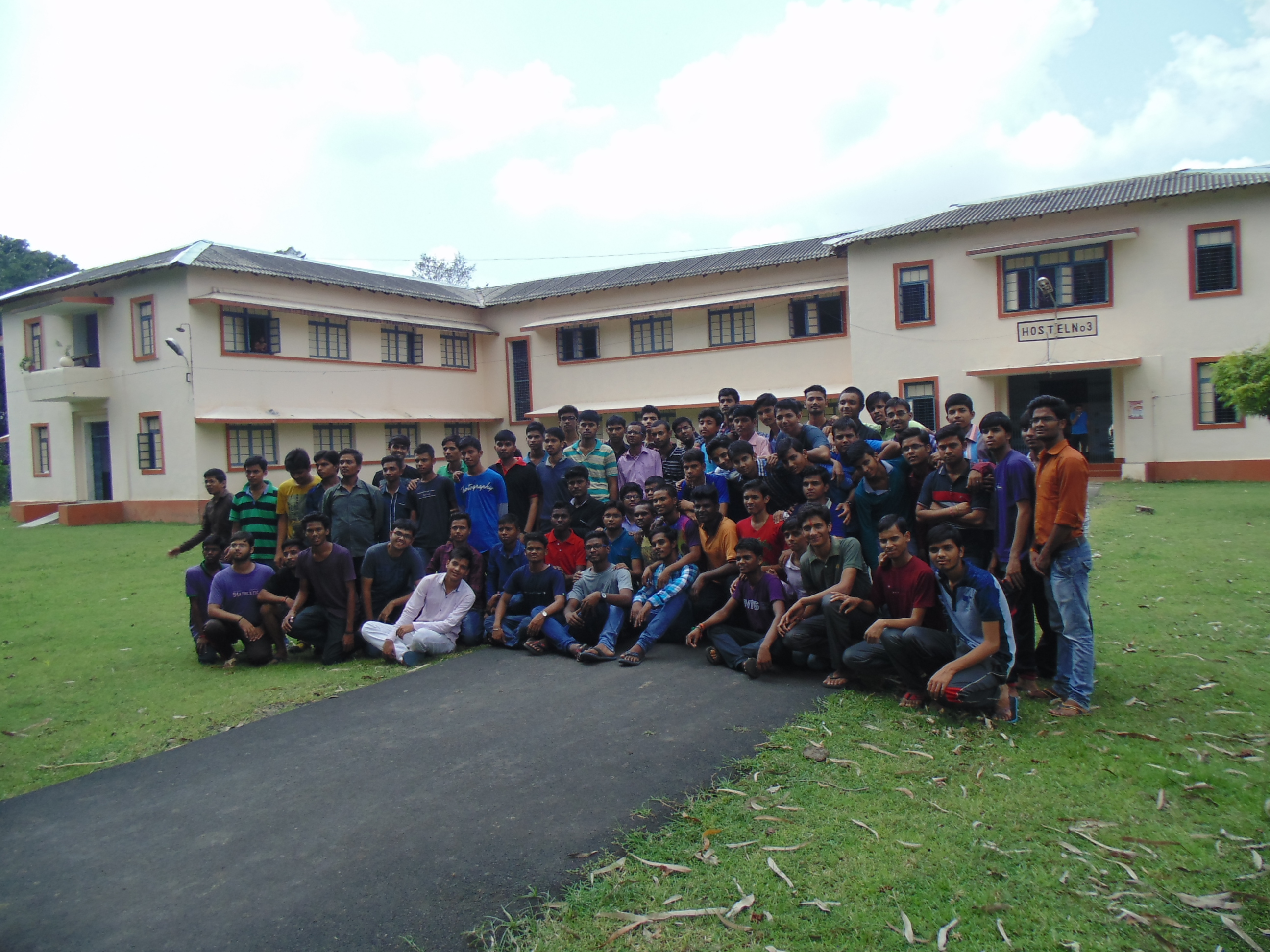
Boys' hostel no. 3

Type	Number of Hostels	Total Capacity
Boys	8	1200
Girls	3	150

=== Events ===
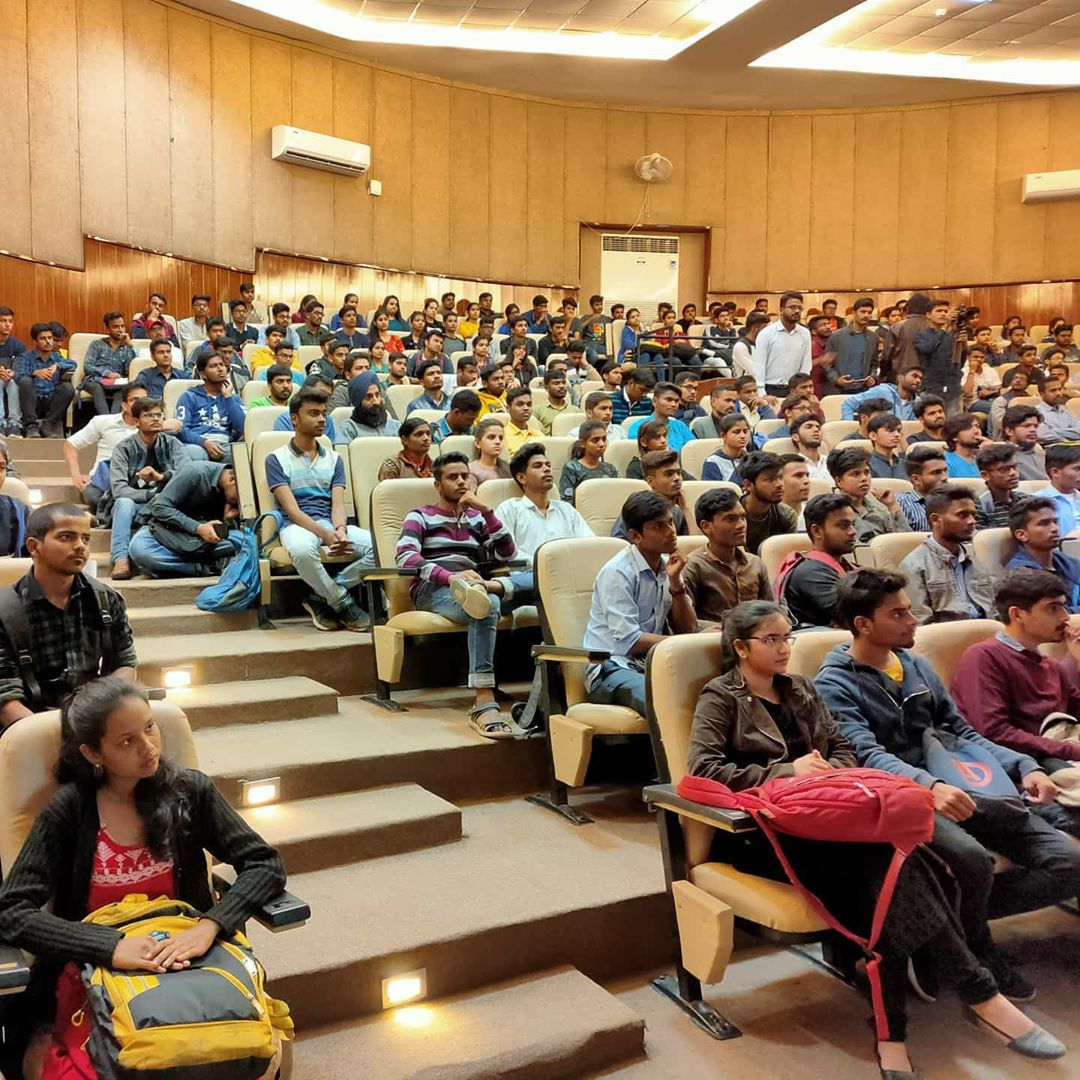
Jashan auditorium

- TEDxJECollege, an international conference, is held annually in the month of February.
- Helix & Aureole is the techno-cultural fest of Jabalpur Engineering College.
- Aaghaz is the intra-college, inter-branch sports-cum-cultural fest and is held annually.

=== Societies ===
- Unofficial Magazine – Abhiyaam
- JEC has its own theatre club – Azaan, which provides a platform for drama, acting and dance.
- Photography society – The Camera Eye.
- Literary society – The Literary Club.
- Musical society – Raag.
- Innovation Council – IIC JEC, The Institution's Innovation Council ( initiative by mhrd ).
- Technical society for CSE /IT sector – The JEC ACM (Association for Computing Machinery).
- Technical society – JLUG (JEC Linux User Group).
- Technical society – Automotive Society.
- Technical society for Electrical Engineering and Robotics – Urja.
- JEC is also home of Kaarwaan, the social welfare society and NGO of JEC, run by college students that helps underprivileged children prepare for Jawahar Navodaya Vidyalaya Selection Test (JNVST) and other similar exams.

== Notable alumni ==
- Ajai Chowdhry – Father of Indian Hardware. Co-founder & former Chairman of HCL Technologies. Awarded Padma Bhushan, the third-highest civilian honour in India. Chairman of IIT Patna and IIIT Naya Raipur, and former Chairman of IIT Hyderabad.
- Sharad Yadav – Former Union Cabinet Minister of India for Civil Aviation, Labour, Textiles, Consumer Affairs, Food & Public Distribution, Member of Parliament of the Lok Sabha and Rajya Sabha, Chairman of Janata Dal (United).
- K. S. Sudarshan – He was the fifth Sarsanghachalak (Chief) of the Rashtriya Swayamsevak Sangh (RSS), the world's largest voluntary non-governmental organisation.
- C. B. Bhave – IAS officer. Former Chairman & Managing Director of National Securities Depository Limited (NSDL) and Securities and Exchange Board of India (SEBI).
- Sunil Kumar Chourasia - IOFS officer. Former Director General, Indian Ordnance Factories and Chairman Ordnance Factory Board.
- P. K. Shrivastava - IOFS officer. Former Director General, Indian Ordnance Factories and Chairman Ordnance Factory Board.
- Anupam Shrivastava - ITS officer. Former Chairman & Managing Director of Bharat Sanchar Nigam Limited.
- Dinesh Kumar Shukla - Former Chairman, Atomic Energy Regulatory Board.
- Sudhir Kumar Mishra – DRDS officer. Director General at the Defence Research & Development Organisation (DRDO), CEO and Managing Director, BrahMos Aerospace.
- Upendra Kumar Jain - IPS officer. Director General of Police, Madhya Pradesh.
- Saumitra Kumar Haldar - CWES officer. Former Chairman, Central Water Commission.
- Sachidananda Kangovi - Indian-American engineer. Known for developing 'Service Linked Multi-State' system (SLIMS), a critical part of the Telecom provisioning and activation system. He is the author of a book titled "Peering of Carrier Ethernet Networks" published by Elsevier in 2017. This book is recognized by the Book Authority as "One of the best bandwidth books of all time".
- Romesh Sobti - Former Managing Director & CEO of IndusInd Bank and ABN AMRO Bank, Director on Board of Dabur, Adani Green Energy, Delhivery and Aditya Birla Capital.
- Hemchandra Kekre – Founding Head of department, Computer Science & Engineering at IIT Bombay. Also served as a professor of Electrical Engineering at IIT-B.
- Sameer Khandekar - Former Dean IIT Kanpur.
- Uday Khedker - Head of Computer Science & Engineering at IIT Bombay.
- Vipin Kumar Saxena - Former Chairman & Managing Director of Garden Reach Shipbuilders and Engineers, Rear Admiral, Indian Navy.
- Shyam Mardikar – Chief Technology Officer, Reliance Jio and former CTO, Bharti Airtel. Also served as an ITS officer.
- Dilip Suryavanshi - Founder and Chairman of Dilip Buildcon, richest person in the state of Madhya Pradesh.
- Sharat Saxena – Veteran Indian film and television actor.
- Prakash Naidu – Former Project Director, Institute for Robotics and Intelligent Systems, Bangalore.
- Shreegopal Vyas – Member of Parliament of the Rajya Sabha.
- Visva Mohan Tiwari – Retired Air Vice Marshal, Indian Air Force.
- Vibhas Pande - Air Marshal, Indian Air Force, currently serving as the 37th Air Officer Commanding-in-Chief (AOC-in-C), Maintenance Command.
