= Sudhir Kumar Mishra =

Indian engineer

- Born: Jabalpur, Madhya Pradesh, India
- Education: GEC Jabalpur (B.E.); IIT Madras (M.Tech); NIT Warangal (PhD)
- Occupations: Director General, Chief Executive Officer and Managing Director
- Notable credit(s): Missiles & Strategic Systems

Sudhir Kumar Mishra is an Indian engineer, defence scientist and civil servant. He is currently the director general at the Defence Research & Development Organisation, and the chief executive officer and managing director of BrahMos Aerospace, a joint venture between India's and Russia's ministries of defence.

== Early life and education ==
Mishra was born and brought up in Jabalpur, Madhya Pradesh in central India. Throughout meritorious, he got admission in to the Mechanical Engineering department of the prestigious Government Engineering College, Jabalpur where he received his bachelor's degree in 1982. He later received his master's degree from the Indian Institute of Technology, Madras and his doctoral degree from the National Institute of Technology, Warangal.

== Career ==
Soon after graduating from IIT Madras, he joined DRDO's main missile laboratory, the DRDL Hyderabad in 1984 and worked under A. P. J. Abdul Kalam and other eminent scientists on the Integrated Guided Missile Development Programme and other missile programmes of India, including the Agni and BrahMos. He served as the Project Director of BrahMos, the world's only supersonic missile. He also served as Counsellor and Technical Adviser (Defence Technology) at the Embassy of India in Moscow, coordinating several defence R&D projects between India and Russia. He served as the Director (Missiles) at DRDO overseeing all the missile programmes of India, and later as the Chief Controller (Research and Development) at DRDO.

He has been awarded with the “DRDO Scientist of the Year Award 2009” by the Prime Minister of India.
