= Sachidananda Kangovi =

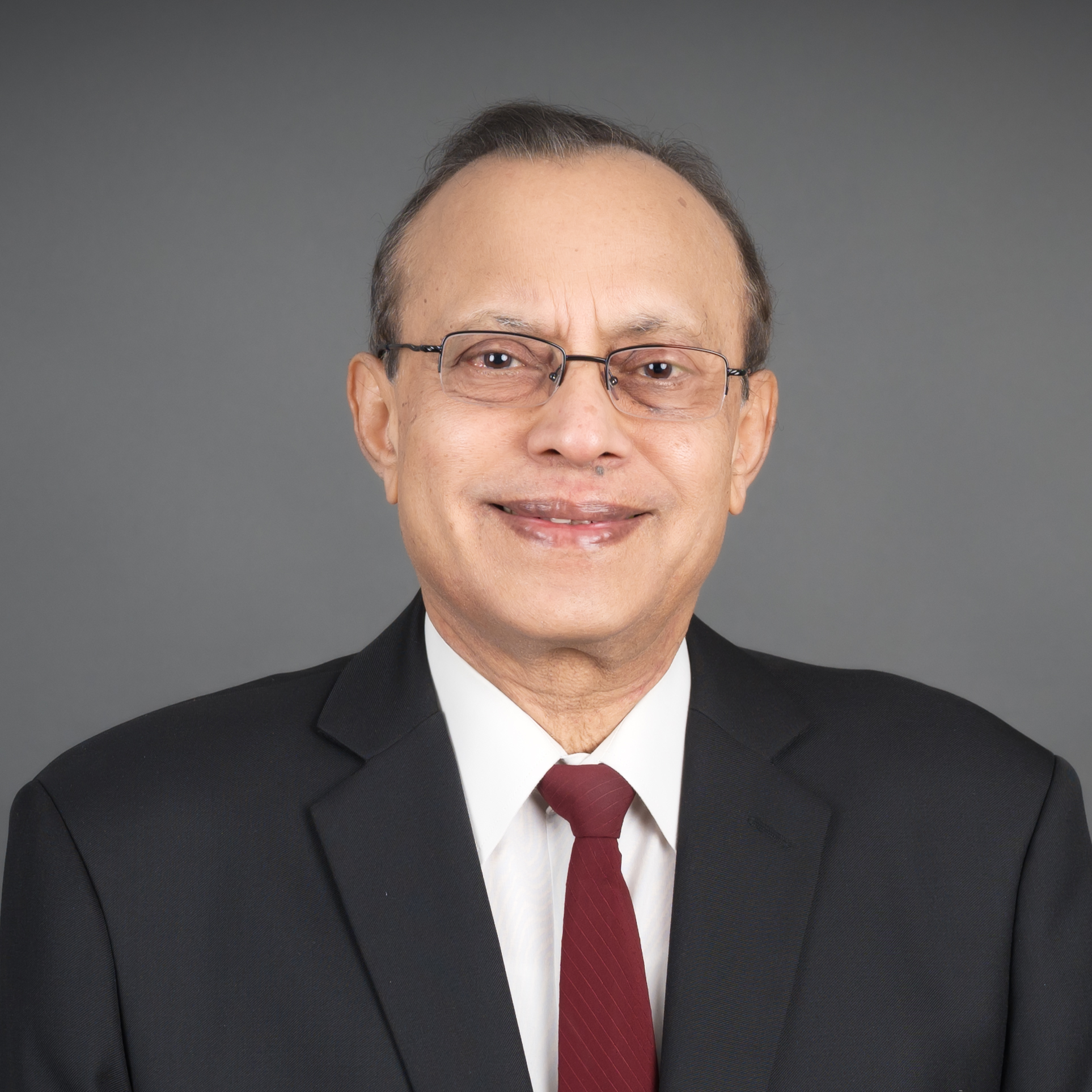
- Kangovi in 2024
- Born: August 25, 1948 (age 77)
- Citizenship: United States
- Engineering career
- Discipline: Science and engineering
- Institutions: Jabalpur Engineering College; Indian Institute of Science; Rutgers- The State University of New Jersey
- Employers: National Aerospace Laboratories; Comcast; AT&T; Satyam Computer Services
- Significant design: Service Linked Multi-State' system (SLIMS); testing facility for exhaust flow from rocket and jet engines

Sachidananda Kangovi (born August 25, 1948), also known as Sach Kangovi, is an American technology executive, aerospace engineer, author, and developer of the 'Service Linked Multi-State' system (SLIMS), a part of the Telecom provisioning and activation system. He was also involved in the development of a facility to test exhaust flow from rocket and jet engines, designated by National Aerospace Laboratory.

== Early life ==
Sachidananda Kangovi, born in the Indian city of Bengaluru on August 25, 1948, earned a bachelor's degree in engineering from Jabalpur Engineering College and a master's degree from Indian Institute of Science. His doctoral studies were at Rutgers- The State University of New Jersey from where he got his Ph.D. in 1977, under the guidance of Dr. Robert H. Page.

== Career ==
He started his career as a senior scientist at National Aerospace Laboratory in 1971 before moving to the US in 1982, to work on computational fluid dynamics (CFD) at Boeing, and Johnson & Johnson. Later, he worked on information technology at Comcast, AT&T and erstwhile Satyam Computer Services, an India-based global IT Company as the vice president of Telecom sector. He also was an adjunct professor at DeVry University, in its School of Business and Management.

== Achievements ==
Kangovi designed and developed a test facility called 'Base Flow Facility' to study the effect of exhaust flows from rocket engines and jet engines on thrust as well as control surface effectiveness and this facility has been designated as one of the world's most exceptional and one-of-a -kind testing facilities by the National Aerospace Laboratory. At Comcast as Design Lead and Distinguished Engineer, Kangovi spearheaded a team of designers to develop the Service Linked Multi-State (SLIMS) System, a critical part of Telecommunication provisioning and customer activation system. His work on Service Linked Multi-State (SLIMS) earned him several US and global patents. As a Senior Enterprise Architect at AT&T, Kangovi worked on the end-to-end solution architecture of OSS/BSS system for the MEF standard-based External Network-to-Network Interface (ENNI) project, an AT&T initiative called Velocity IP (VIP) and Fiber Broadband Services (FBS). While at AT&T, he authored a reference book titled Peering Carrier Ethernet Networks published by Elsevier in 2017, which has since been recognised by the Book Authority as "One of the best bandwidth books of all time". His another book The Law of Disorder is being cited by many researchers in their theses/papers.

=== Books ===
- Kangovi, Sachidananda (2016). Peering Carrier Ethernet Networks. Morgan Kaufmann.
- Kangovi, Sachidananda (2020). THE LAW OF DISORDER: Our existence itself depends on this law. What is it and how to manage it?. ISBN 979-8677301285.

== See also ==
- Network-to-network interface
- Computational fluid dynamics
