= Jagjeet Singh =

Air Marshal Jagjeet Singh PVSM, VSM, ADC
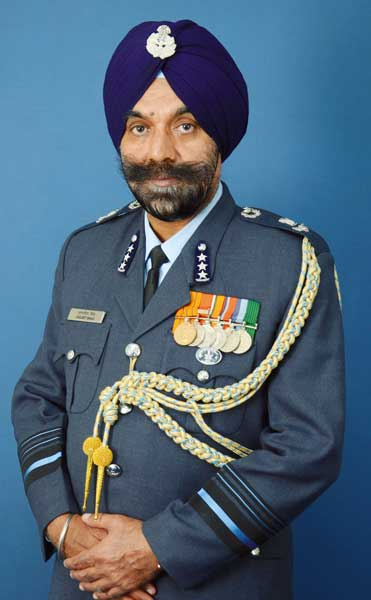
- Military career
- Allegiance: India
- Branch: Indian Air Force
- Service years: 1977 to 31 March 2016
- Rank: Air Marshal
- Nickname: Jaggi
- Commands: AOC-in-C Maintenance Command; Director General (Aircraft); Director General (Systems); Senior Maintenance Staff Officer at Headquarters of Central Air Command; Command Engineering Officer at Headquarters of South Western Air Command; Chief Engineering Officer at Air Force Academy
- Awards: Param Vishisht Seva Medal; Vishisht Seva Medal; Chief of the Air Staff Commendation (Twice)

Air Marshal Jagjeet Singh PVSM, VSM, ADC was the former Air Officer Commanding-in-Chief of Maintenance Command of Indian Air Force headquartered at Nagpur.

== Education ==
He has done his Matric from Senior Model High School Patiala, and completed 12th from Mahendra College Patiala. He holds bachelor's degree in Electrical Engineering from Thapar University, Patiala, Punjab. He also holds a PG Diploma in Management from IGNOU.

== Career ==
He was commissioned into Aeronautical Engineering Branch of Indian Air Force in 1977 .The officer has rich experience in maintenance management of aircraft and systems and has held various field and staff appointments. He has commanded a Technical Type Training School for fighter aircraft and a Base Repair Depot. He has also held the appointments of Chief Engineering Officer at Air Force Academy, Command Engineering Officer at Headquarters of South Western Air Command and Senior Maintenance Staff Officer at Headquarters of Central Air Command. The Air Officer has been Director-General (Aircraft), Director General (Systems) and Air Officer-in-Charge Maintenance at Air Headquarters before succeeding Air Marshal P Kanakraj as the AOC-in-C of Maintenance Command.

== Personal life ==
Air Marshal Jagjeet Singh, popularly known as "Jaggi" among colleagues, enjoys sports including squash and golf. In his spare time, he reads, takes walks, and listens to music.

== Awards and decorations ==

Param Vishisht Seva Medal

Vishisht Seva Medal

- Chief of the Air Staff Commendation (Twice)
