= Yalla Umesh =

Air Marshal in the Indian Air Force

Air Marshal Yalla Umesh VSM
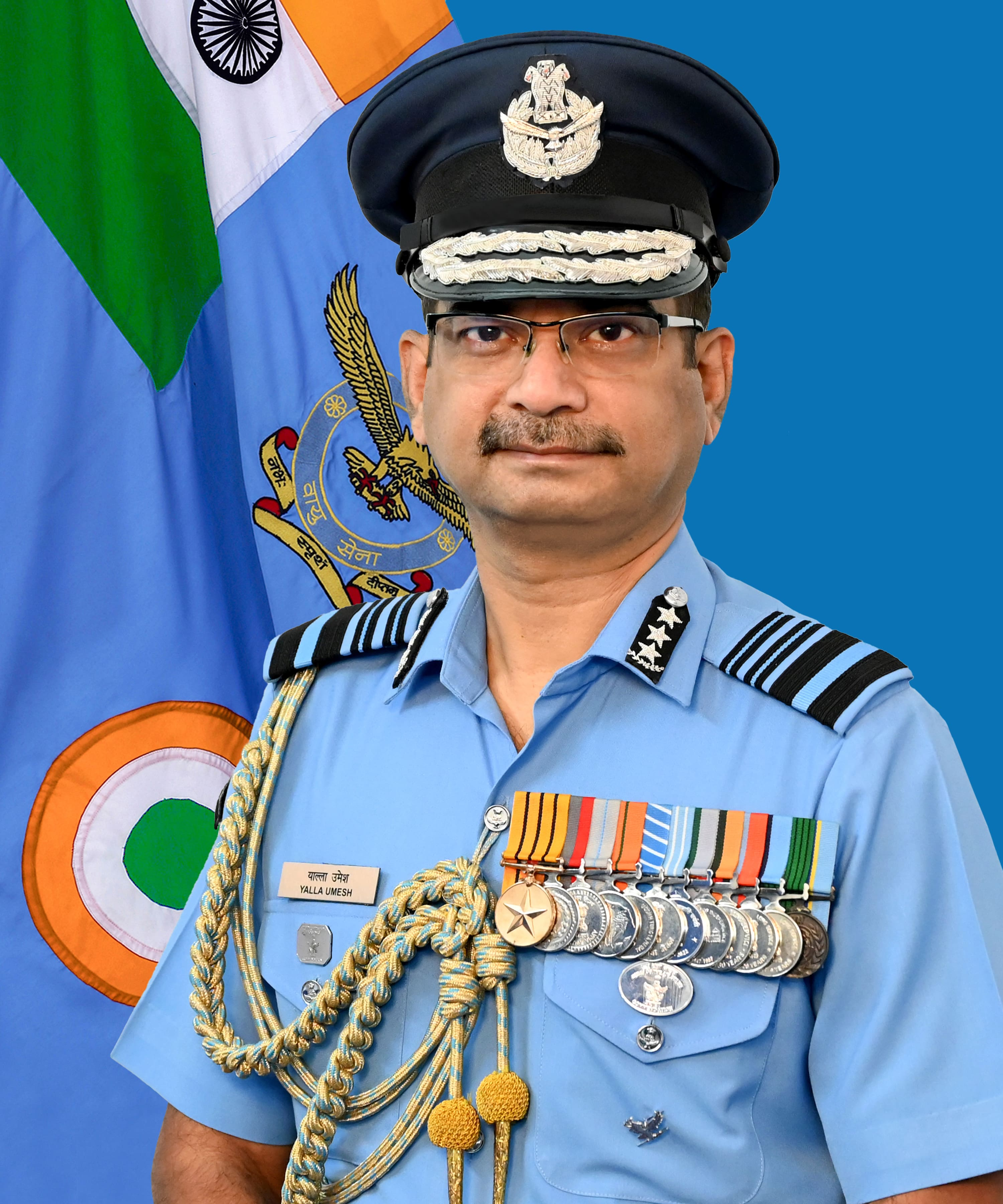

Air Officer Commanding-in-Chief Maintenance Command
- Incumbent
- Assumed office 1 December 2025
- Chief of Air Staff: Amar Preet Singh
- Preceded by: Vijay Kumar Garg

Military service
- Allegiance: India
- Branch/service: Indian Air Force
- Years of service: 4 September 1989 – Present
- Rank: Air Marshal
- Commands: Maintenance Command; 7 Base Repair Depot
- Service number: 20233 AE(M)
- Awards: Vishisht Seva Medal

Air Marshal Yalla Umesh, VSM is a serving air officer of the Indian Air Force. He is currently serving as the Air Officer Commanding-in-Chief, Maintenance Command. He previously served as Director General (Aircraft). He is also the Commodore Commandant of 25 Squadron.

== Early life and education ==
The air officer is an alumnus of the College of Defence Management and the National Defence College, New Delhi. He holds a Doctorate in Management, Post Graduate degrees in Industrial Engineering and Management, and a Bachelor's degree in Mechanical Engineering.

== Military career ==
He was commissioned into the Aeronautical Engineering (Mechanical) Branch of the Indian Air Force on 4 September 1989. He is a 'Category A' aeronautical engineer and has held diverse engineering and leadership appointments across major combat, transport and specialist fleets of the Indian Air Force. During his distinguished service, he has held several key appointments, which include assistant chief of the Air Staff Engineering, air commodore engineering (transport), air officer commanding of a guided weapon base repair depot and chief engineering officer at a UN-operated airfield in DR Congo.

On getting promoted to the rank of air marshal, he assumed the appointment as the director general (aircraft) at the Air Headquarters on 1 November 2024. A year later on 1 December 2025, he took over as the air officer commanding-in-chief, Maintenance Command succeeding Air Marshal Vijay Kumar Garg, who superannuated on 30 November 2025.

== Awards and decorations ==
For his distinguished service, he was awarded the Vishisht Seva Medal in 2022. He has also received commendations from the Chief of Air Staff and AOC-in-C, Central Air Command.

Vishisht Seva Medal	Special Service Medal	Operation Vijay Medal	Sainya Seva Medal
High Altitude Medal	Videsh Seva Medal	75th Independence Anniversary Medal	50th Independence Anniversary Medal
30 Years Long Service Medal	20 Years Long Service Medal	9 Years Long Service Medal	MONUSCO

== Dates of ranks ==
Insignia	Rank	Component	Date of rank
	Pilot Officer	Indian Air Force	4 September 1989
	Flying Officer	Indian Air Force	4 September 1990
	Flight Lieutenant	Indian Air Force	4 September 1994
	Squadron Leader	Indian Air Force	4 September 2000
	Wing Commander	Indian Air Force	16 December 2004
	Group Captain	Indian Air Force	1 April 2012
	Air Commodore	Indian Air Force	1 July 2020
	Air Vice Marshal	Indian Air Force	11 May 2023
	Air Marshal	Indian Air Force	1 November 2024(AOC-in-C from 1 December 2025)
