= A. Sivathanu Pillai =

Indian scientist (born 1947)

A Sivathanu Pillai
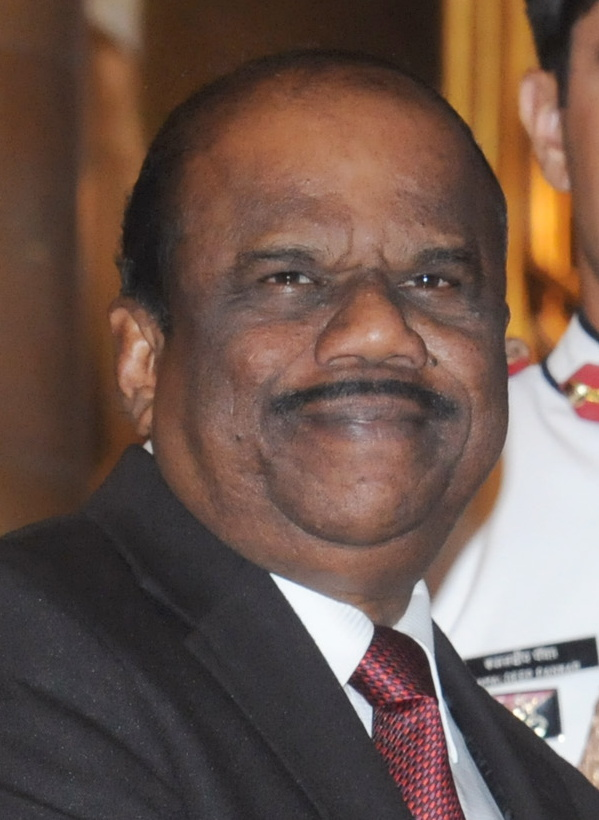
- Pillai in 2013
- Born: 15 July 1947 (age 79); Nagercoil, Kanyakumari, Tamil Nadu, India
- Education: Thiagarajar College of Engineering (B.E.); University of Pune (PhD)
- Occupations: Nuclear physicist Rocket scientist Administrator
- Known for: Known as Father of Brahmos Aerospace
- Spouse: Seetha Sivathanu Pillai
- Children: 1
- Awards: Padma Shri (2002); Padma Bhushan (2013); Order of Friendship (2014)
- Scientific career
- Fields: Nuclear physics Aerospace engineering Electrical engineering
- Workplaces: Defence Research and Development Organisation

A. Sivathanu Pillai is an Indian scientist who was an honorary distinguished professor at Indian Space Research Organisation (2015–2018) and an honorary professor at IIT Delhi in the Department of Mechanical Engineering (2015–2016) and a visiting professor at Indian Institute of Science (2014–2015).

He is the president of Project Management Associates and is the former chairperson of the board of governors of the National Institute of Technology, Kurukshetra.

He was Chief Controller of Research and Development from 1996 to 2014 and held the rank of "Distinguished Scientist" from 1999 to 2014 at the Defence Research and Development Organisation at the Ministry of Defence of the Republic of India. He is also the founder-CEO and managing director of the BrahMos Aerospace Private Limited.

He also previously was Vice President of International Project Management Association and as Special Secretary representing India in the India-Russia Inter-Governmental Commission on Military-Technical Cooperation.

== Early life and education ==
Apathukatha Sivathanu Pillai was born in Nagercoil in Kanyakumari District, Tamilnadu on 15 July 1947. He completed his schooling at D.V.D. Higher Secondary School, Nagercoil,. He earned his Bachelor of Electrical Engineering from Thiagarajar College of Engineering in 1969.

In 1991, he attended the six-week Advanced Management Program at Harvard Business School. He then earned PhD in Technology Management from Savitribai Phule Pune University in 1996. Pillai is a close friend of former President of India A. P. J. Abdul Kalam

== Career ==
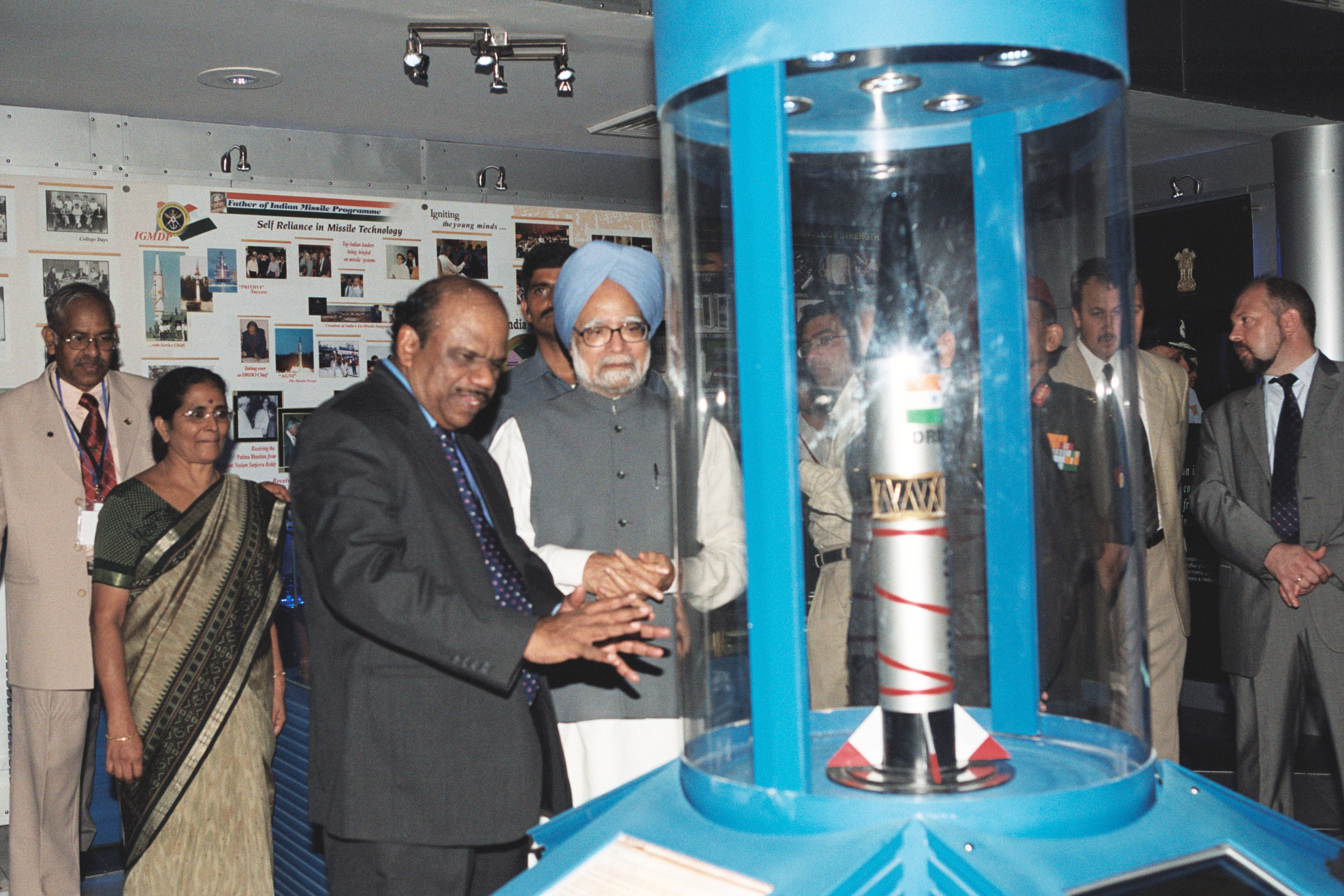
Sivathanu Pillai introducing a model missile to 13th Prime Minister of India Manmohan Singh at BrahMos Complex in New Delhi.

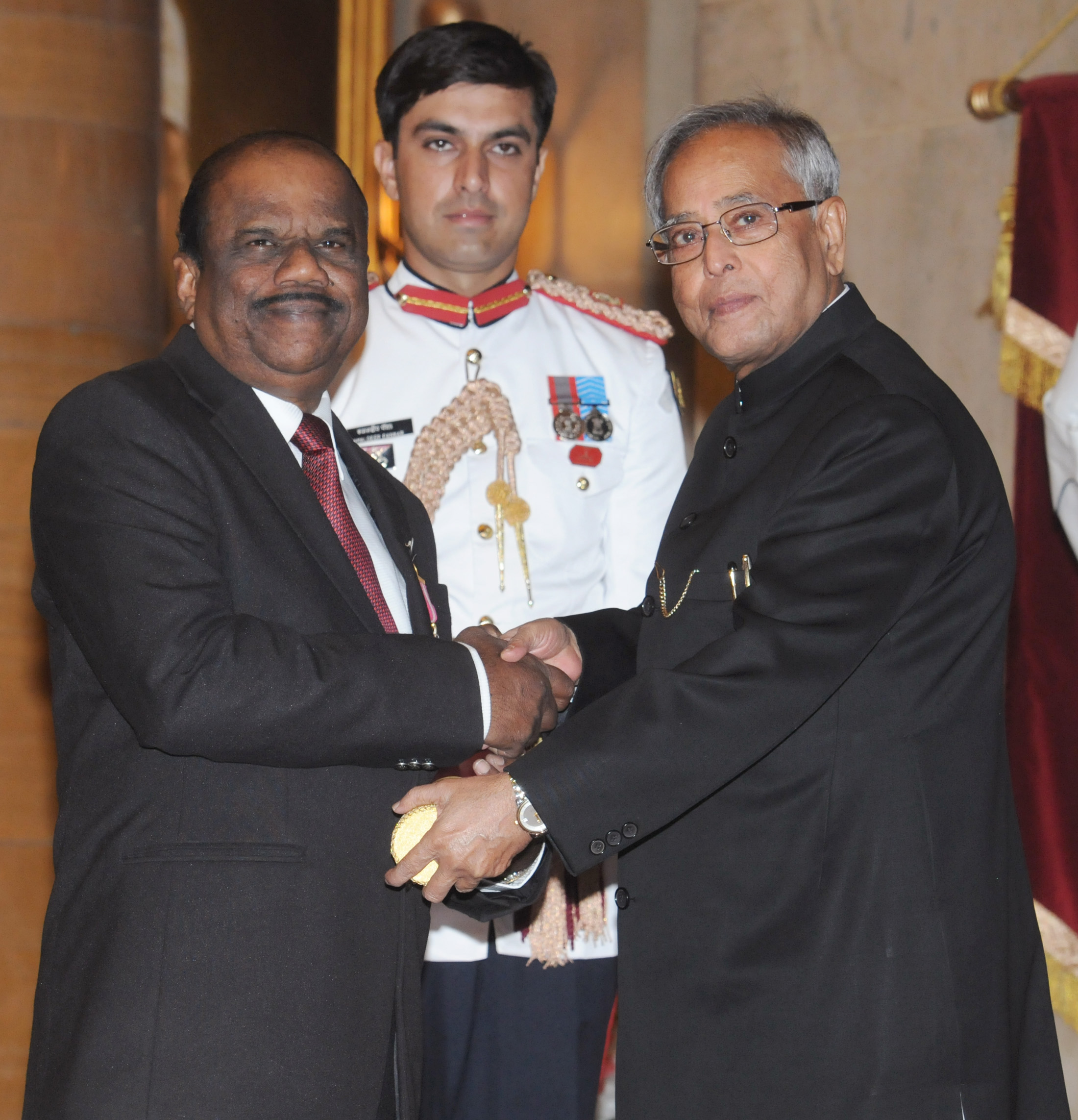
13th President of India Pranab Mukherjee presenting the Padma Bhushan Sivathanu Pillai at an Investiture Ceremony at Rashtrapati Bhavan, in New Delhi.

=== Academia ===
Pillai is as honorary distinguished professor at Indian Space Research Organisation and an honorary professor at IIT Delhi in the Department of Mechanical Engineering and a visiting professor at Indian Institute of Science.

He was the chairperson of the board of governors of the National Institute of Technology, Kurukshetra.

=== ISRO and DRDO ===
Pillai joined the Defence Research and Development Service and has four decades of experience in ISRO and DRDO and has worked with Vikram Sarabhai, Satish Dhawan and APJ Abdul Kalam.

He joined DRDO in 1986 and was the Programme Director of IGMDP under the leadership of A. P. J. Kalam. He contributed to the successful development of SLV III as a core team member and to the evolution of PSLV configuration for ISRO.

=== Brahmos Aerospace ===
In August 2007 he was given a third extension of his retirement date by the Appointments Committee of the Cabinet.

Pillai is regarded as the "Father of Brahmos", the joint venture between India and Russia to design, develop, produce and market the supersonic cruise missile BrahMos and he is the chief executive and managing director of BrahMos Aerospace. In 2007, under his leadership as CEO of Brahmos Aerospace, the company bought Kerala Hitech Industries Limited. It has been then converted into Brahmos Aerospace Trivandrum Limited, the second missile making unit of BrahMos Aerospace Private Limited for a world-class missile facility with system integration and testing.

== Awards and honours ==
Year of award or honor	Name of award or honor	Awarding organization
2014	Lifetime Achievement Award	Rotary International.
2014	Lal Bahadur Shastri National Award	Lal Bahadur Shastri Institute of Management.
2014	Order of Friendship	President of Russia.
2013	Padma Bhushan	President of India.
2009	DRDO Technology Leadership Award	Prime Minister of India.
2009	Level A certification of Project Directorship	International Project Management Association (IPMA), Switzerland.
2008	Honorary Doctorate	Thapar University, India.
2007	Honorary Doctorate	Avinashilingam University, India.
2006	Honorary Doctorate	Bharathiar University, India.
2006	Honorary Doctorate	State Marine Technical University of St. Petersburg, Russia.
2006	Honorary Doctorate	Andhra University, India.
2006	Raja Rammohan Puraskar Award	Ministry of Defence.
2005	DRDO Performance Excellence Award	Ministry of Defence.
2005	Honorary Doctorate	Sathyabama University, India.
2005	Honorary Doctorate	Tamil Nadu Dr. MGR Medical University, India.
2003	The Order of the Peter the Great and the Academician of the university	The Moscow University of Security, Defence and Law Enforcement, Russia.
2003	Award for dedicated service, co-operation, development and peace	OISCA International, Japan.
2002	Padma Shri	President of India.
2001	Dr. Davidson Frame Award	University of Technology & Management, USA.
1988	DRDO Scientist of the year	Ministry of Defence.

== Books, research papers and journals ==
Sivathanu Pillai is a published author and coauthor of several books, research papers and journals.

- The Path Unexplored. Pentagon Press. 2014. ISBN 9788182747906.
- Thoughts For Change — We Can Do It. Pentagon Press. 2012. ISBN 9788182747074.
- Envisioning an empowered nation: technology for societal transformation. Tata McGraw-Hill Pub. Co. 2004. ISBN 978-0-07-053154-3.
- Sivathanu Pillai, A. (2005). Technology Leadership – A Revolution in the Making: defining the future visionary leaders. Tata McGraw-Hill Publishing Company. ISBN 9780070583283.
- Nanoscience and Nanotechnology in Engineering. World Scientific. 2010. ISBN 978-981-4277-92-1.
- Ocean Warfare: The Technology Waves. Manas Publications. 2006. ISBN 978-81-7049-239-9.
- Sivathanu Pillai, A. (2011). Revolution in Leadership – Building Technology Competence. Pentagon Press. ISBN 9788182745520.
- Varadan, Vijay K.; Pillai, Sivathanu; Chen, Dr Linfeng (2010). Nanotechnology Engineering in Nano- and Bio-Medicine: Devices and Applications. John Wiley & Sons Canada, Limited. ISBN 9780470758632.

Business positions
New title	CEO and MD of BrahMos Aerospace; 1995–2014	Succeeded by Sudhir Mishra
Educational offices
Preceded by	Chairperson of the Board of Governors at National Institute of Technology, Kurukshetra	Succeeded by
