= Shyam Mardikar =

- Born: 23 March 1971 (age 55); Jabalpur
- Education: Jabalpur Engineering College, Class of 1992
- Occupation: Chief Technology Office - Mobile Networks at Reliance Jio (India)
- Spouse: Jaishree Mardikar
- Children: 2

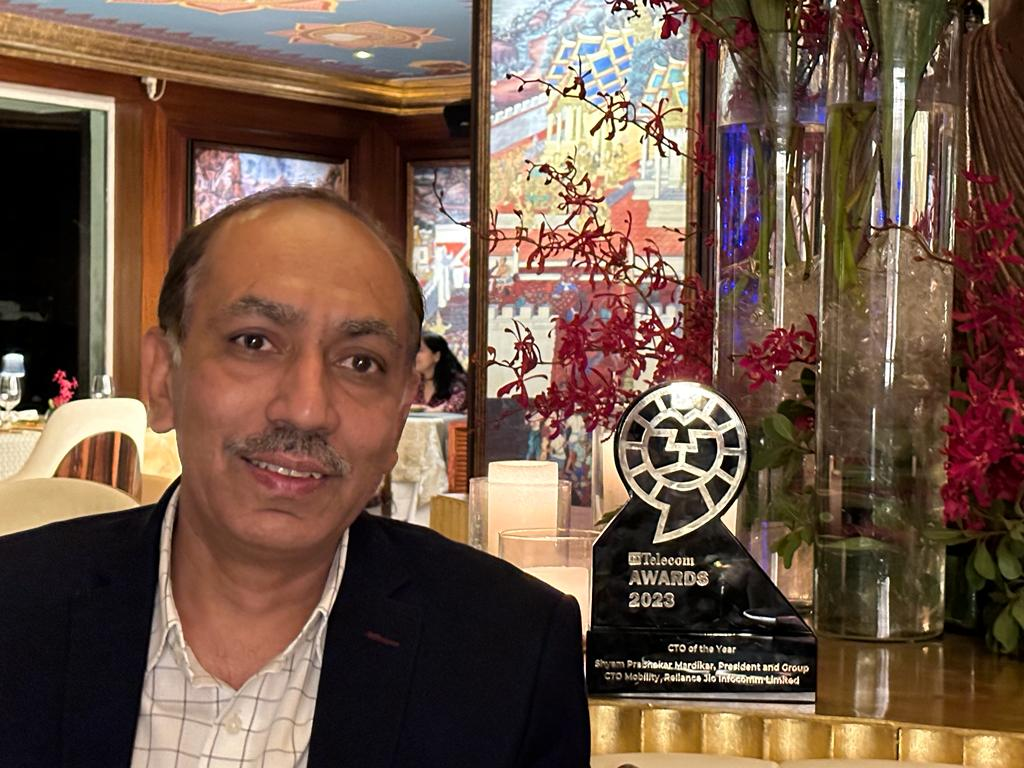
Shyam Mardikar with the Economic Times CTO Of the Year - 2023 Award

Shyam Prabhakar Mardikar (born 23 March 1971) is The Group Chief Technology Officer - Mobility at Reliance Jio Infocomm Limited (India), an Indian multinational telecommunications services company, headquartered at Reliance Corporate Park, Navi Mumbai, Maharashtra, India, it operates a national LTE and 5G network with coverage across all 22 telecom circles.

== Personal ==
Shyam Prabhakar Mardikar was born on 23 March 1971 in Jabalpur. His father was an Indian Forest Service Officer of Madhya Pradesh Cadre.

Shyam attended various schools in Madhya Pradesh including Holy Cross Convent in Raipur (now Chhattisgarh), Miss Hill School in Gwalior and St Xavier's in Surguja (now Chhattisgarh).

He received his Bachelors in Electronics & Telecommunications Engineering from Jabalpur Engineering College in Jabalpur, Madhya Pradesh.

Shyam is married to Jaishree Mardikar, who works for GAIL India limited. They have two sons, Shubham and Aniket.

== Career Progression ==
Shyam started his career in 1994 with C-DOT (Centre for development of Telematics) as a software research engineer and was part of the software team upgrading the C-DOT switches to signalling system #7.

In 1995, he joined the Department of telecommunications as an Indian Telecom Service officer and held various operational and management positions across the country. In late 1990s, the Indian telecom sector was bursting with new growth aspects post liberalisation of telecom. Shyam moved out of DoT and joined Bharti Airtel in 2001 as the head of network planning for their fixed line operations. He later ran the network services vertical of Airtel's mobile network and was the head of network engineering of integrated network entity of Airtel called the NSG. In 2010, he was also a member of GSMA's executive management committee.

Shyam moved out of Airtel later in 2010 and joined Lebara group as The Chief Technology Officer. He was based out of London; where he was responsible for implementation & execution of the Company's technology strategy and aligning the technology vision with the business strategy across its 7 countries.

In 2012, Shyam came back to India in Bharti Airtel as Chief of Strategy, Architecture and Engineering.In this role, Shyam was instrumental for transforming the network architecture to a next generation, mobile broad band enabled, data services centric network. He was also instrumental in driving the overall spectrum strategy to ensure sustaining Airtel's leadership position on the technology front and set the benchmark standards for the industry. From 2016 to 2018, he served as Chief Technology Officer of Mobile Networks for Airtel. Along with his role at Bharti Airtel, Shyam also chaired the technology committee of Cellular Operators Association of India.

In 2018, Shyam moved out of Bharti Airtel to join Reliance Jio as President and Group CTO of mobility. In 2023, Shyam successfully led the fastest 5G roll out in the world, adding more than one million 5G cells for Reliance Jio in a span of 12 months.

== Publications and Strategic Outlook ==
- 2015 - Story of 3 Vs - predicting the evolution towards a digital life
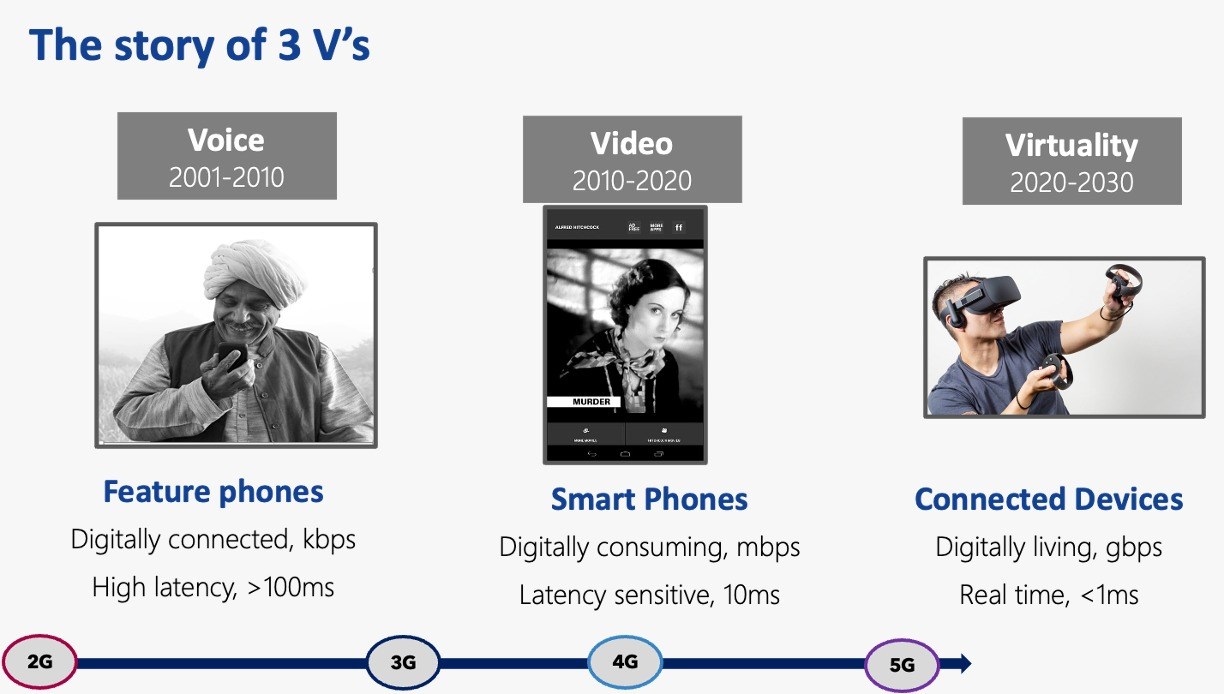
  Evolution of India's telecom growth across decades
- 2018 - SIM is the new socket - Highlighting the pervasiveness of digital sockets as the new age interfaces to all sectors of industry

== Awards and Recognitions ==
- 2023 - Financial Express visionary leadership recognition
- 2023 - CTO of the Year Award - ET Telecom
- 2023 - Ranked 1st on Top 30 CTOs of India - Startup Lane
- 2018 - CTO of the year - Voice and Data
- 2017 - CTO of the Year - Telecom Lead

== Telecom Summit Presence ==
- The Brooklyn 6G Summit
- VAS ASIA 2014
- LTE INDIA 2014
- TD-LTE Summit 2013
- 4G World India Expo & Conference
- Broadband Tech India 2013
- VAS Asia 2013
- VAS India 2010
- 23rd Convergence India 2015 Expo
- Vision 4G LTE Telecom Conclave
- LTE India 2015
