= Vibhas Pande =

Air Officer Commanding-in-Chief, India

Air Marshal Vibhas Pande PVSM AVSM VSM
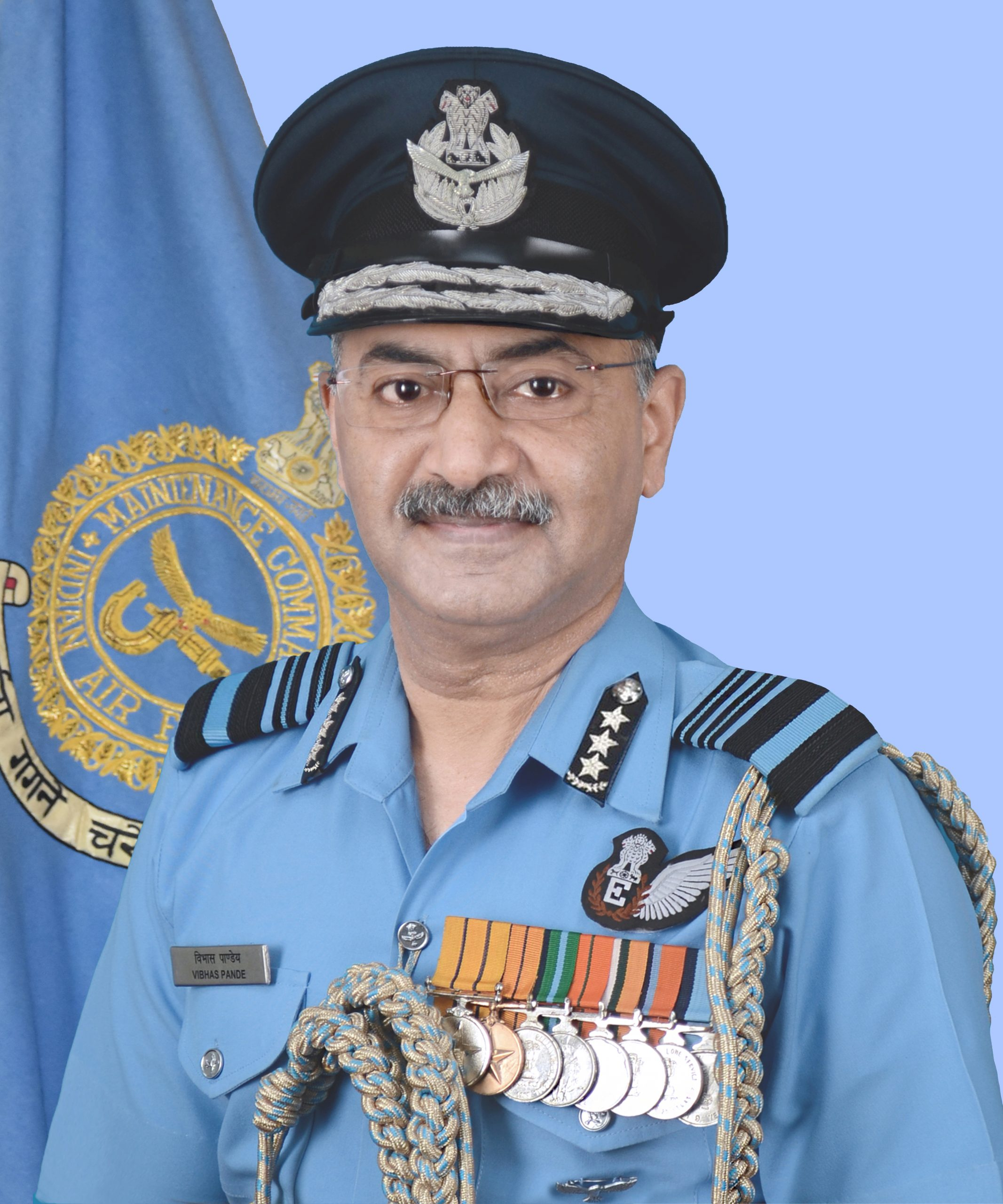

Personal details
- Born: Jabalpur, Madhya Pradesh
- Spouse: Mrs. Ruchira Pande
- Children: Vanya Pande, Vibha Pande
- Awards: Param Vishisht Seva Medal; Ati Vishisht Seva Medal; Vishisht Seva Medal

Military service
- Allegiance: India
- Branch/service: Indian Air Force
- Years of service: 20 August 1984 – 31 May 2024
- Rank: Air Marshal
- Commands: Maintenance Command
- Service number: 17647 AE(M)

Air Marshal Vibhas Pande, PVSM, AVSM, VSM is a retired officer of the Indian Air Force. He served the 37th Air Officer Commanding-in-Chief (AOC-in-C), Maintenance Command. He assumed the office on 14 June 2022 succeeding Air Marshal Shashiker Choudhary.

== Early life and education ==
Vibhas Pande is an alumnus of Government Engineering College, Jabalpur and IIT Mumbai and was recipient of ERTL (W) Bombay Gold Medal for his outstanding performance during the course. He is also an alumnus of College of Air Warfare and National Defence College, New Delhi.

== Career ==
Vibhas Pande was commissioned in the Aeronautical Engineering (Mechanical) in the Indian Air Force. In a career spanning 40 years, he has been trained on the MiG-23 and Antono An-32 planes and well as Mil Mi-17 helicopters.

As a flight engineer he has flown the Mil Mi-8 and Mil Mi-17 helicopters and served the Air Force examiner for the rotary wing platform.

As Air Commodore, he served as the Command Engineering Officer at the Western Air Command and later served as Air Officer Commanding at the 11 Base Repair Depot.

As Air Vice Marshal, he served as the Senior Maintenance Staff Officer at the Eastern Air Command. Later, he served as the Assistant Chief of Air Staff (ACAS), Engineering Transport and Helicopter at Air HQ (VB) in New Delhi.

He had been the founder Commanding Officer of Central Indigenisation and Manufacturing Depot (CIMD), Nashik.

As Air Marshal, he held the appointment of Director General (Aircraft) at Air HQ and took over as the Air Officer-in-Charge Maintenance on 1 January 2020.

He took over as the 37th Air Officer Commanding-in-Chief, Maintenance Command on 14 June 2022 from Air Marshal Shashiker Choudhary.

== Honours and decorations ==
During his career, Vibhas Pande has been awarded the Param Vishisht Seva Medal in 2024 Ati Vishisht Seva Medal in 2021 and Vishisht Seva Medal in 2017 for his service.

Ati Vishisht Seva Medal	Vishisht Seva Medal

== Personal life ==
Air Marshal Vibhas Pande is a qualified astrologer and an avid sportsman. He enjoys playing Squash and Golf. He is married to Mrs Ruchira Pande and is blessed with two daughters namely Vanya Pande and Vibha Pande.

Military offices
Preceded by Shashiker Choudhary	Air Officer Commanding-in-Chief, Maintenance Command; 14 June 2022 – Incumbent	Succeeded by Incumbent
Preceded by Shashiker Choudhary	Air Officer-in-Charge Maintenance; 1 December 2020 – 13 June 2022	Succeeded by N/A
