= Prakash Naidu =

Indian scientist

Dr. Prakash Naidu is a scientist in the field of Design for Automation. He has worked in or has been affiliated with leading institutions, laboratories, and industry in USA, Canada, and India in different capacities including Senior Systems Design Engineer, Senior Research Scientist, Project Director, Advisor, and Consultant.

== Early life and education ==
Dr. Naidu received his PhD in engineering from University of Toronto, Canada in 1997, and M.Tech. from Indian Institute of Technology, Madras in 1987. He is also an alumnus of Bangalore University and Jabalpur Engineering College.

== Professional accomplishments ==
Dr. Naidu is the originator of the field of Design for Automation and Design for Patentability and his research accomplishments are in the areas of design theory and methodology, design of intelligent systems, medical devices, biotechnology systems, and related areas using the broad knowledge and experience gained in the interdisciplinary fields of Engineering Design, Advanced Manufacturing, Mechatronics, Robotics, Automation, and Virtual Reality. He is known for being the co-patent holder of one of the pioneering and most accurate DNA Arraying robotic systems development during the Human Genome Project era. Many of his developments were protected as intellectual property of the organizations involved. His research of scholarly nature that is available in public domain can be found in the different papers and patents from the internet links and archives. His most recent and first invention in the domain of artificial intelligence, which is titled "Method for real time surface tracking in unstructured environments" was granted a US patent in 2022. He is a Member of the American Society of Mechanical Engineers, Associate Member of the Intellectual Property Institute of Canada (IPIC), and licensed Member of the Association of Professional Engineers Ontario (P.Eng.) Canada.

Dr. Naidu has received several awards and honors including: Canadian Commonwealth Scholarship and Fellowship Award, National Mechanical Engineering Design Award, and National Student Design Competition Award from National Design and Research Forum, Institution of Engineers (India). As Project Director of the Institute for Robotics and Intelligent Systems (IRIS), he received the Defense Technology Spin-off Award from the honorable Prime Minister of India Dr. Manmohan Singh for remarkable strides in commercialization of affordable robotic and automation systems for educational, medical, and socially relevant causes in collaboration with small and medium enterprises.
