= BrahMos Aerospace =

India Russia joint venture

BrahMos Aerospace Private Limited
- Type: Government-owned corporation
- Industry: Aerospace and Defense
- Founded: 5 December 1995
- Headquarters: New Delhi, India
- Key people: Dr. Jaiteerth Raghavendra Joshi (CEO & Managing Director)
- Products: Cruise missiles
- Total assets: US$5 billion (2013)
- Owners: Defense Research and Development Organisation (India) and NPO Mashinostroeyenia (Russia)
- Website: brahmos.com

BrahMos Aerospace is an Indo-Russian multinational aerospace and defense corporation, with core manufacturing concentrations in cruise missiles. Headquartered in New Delhi, India, it was founded as a joint venture between the India's Defence Research and Development Organisation and NPO Mashinostroyeniya of Russia. Company's name is a portmanteau formed from the names of two rivers, the Brahmaputra of India and the Moskva of Russia. The company currently manufactures the BrahMos missile with a range of 800 km and traveling at speeds of Mach 2.8. It is also reportedly developing BrahMos-II, a hypersonic cruise missile.

India is a member of the MTCR, India and Russia are now planning to jointly develop a new generation of Brahmos missiles with 600 km-plus range and an ability to hit protected targets with pinpoint accuracy.

== History ==
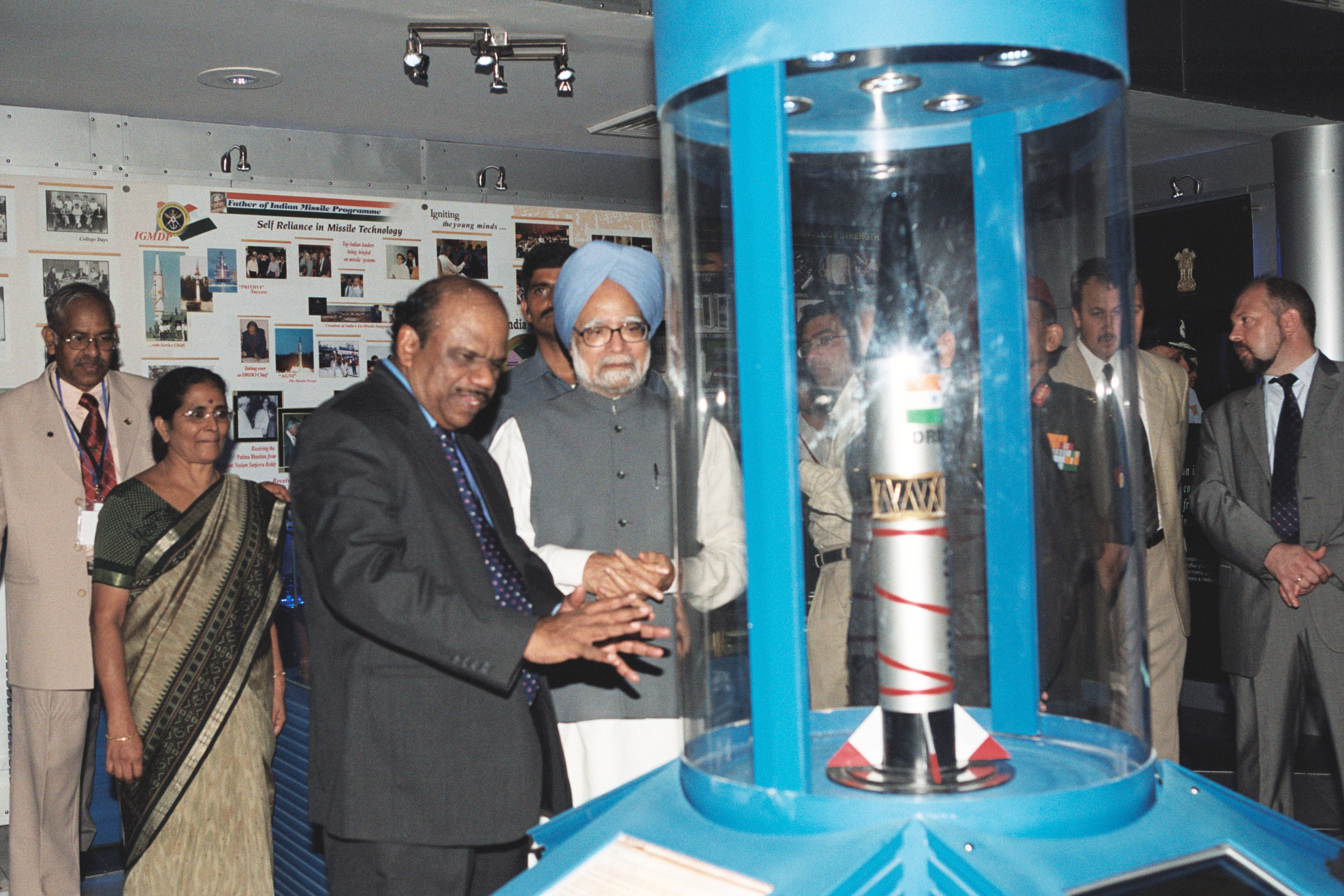
Founder CEO Sivathanu Pillai introducing a model missile to 13th Prime Minister of India Manmohan Singh at BrahMos Complex in New Delhi.

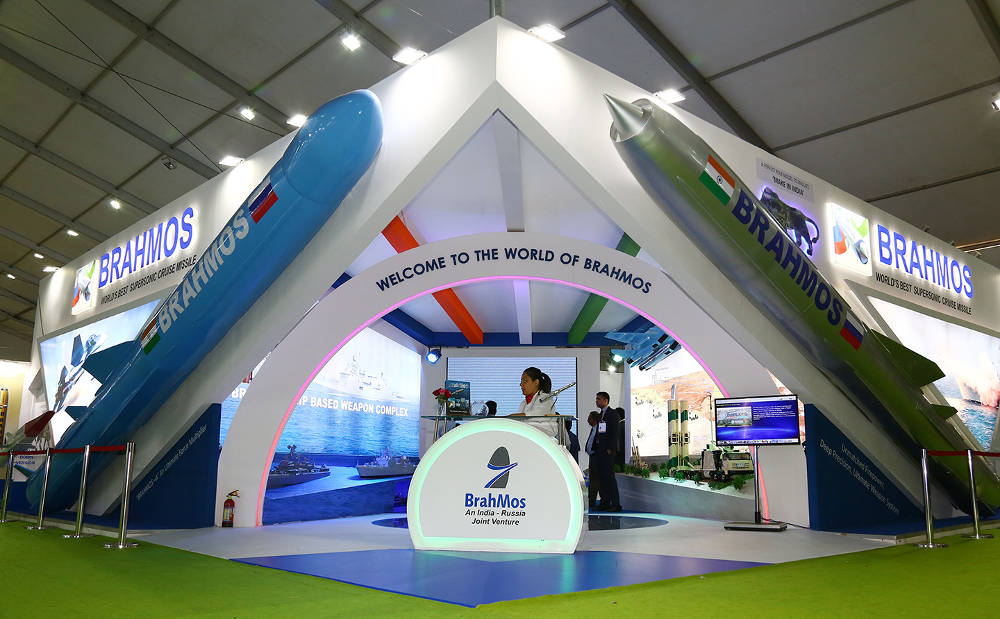
BrahMos Aerospace stall at Defexpo 2016 in New Delhi.

After the Gulf War of the 1990s, there was a feeling that it was necessary to have a cruise missile system in India. As a result, in 1998, then Scientific Advisor of India to Defence Minister A. P. J. Abdul Kalam and Deputy Defence Minister of Russia N.V. Mikhailov signed an inter-governmental agreement in Moscow.

India holds a 50.5% share stake in the company and Russia holds the other 49.5%.

== Facilities ==
=== Hyderabad facility ===
The original BrahMos Integration Complex is located at a 40 acres (0.16 km^{2}) space in Hyderabad, Andhra Pradesh with a force of 300 employees. By 2006, BAPL had a production rate of 100 missiles per year with plans to increase the number to 400 by 2009.

=== Thiruvananthapuram facility ===
On 5 December 2007, BrahMos Aerospace acquired Kerala Hitech Industries Limited at Thiruvananthapuram in Kerala and converted it into the second missile making unit with system integration and testing, marking the state's first defence production unit. The unit operates as BrahMos Aerospace Trivandrum Limited (BATL) — a wholly owned subsidiary of BrahMos Aerospace. The facility operates on a land of 15.80 acres (63,900 m^{2}).

In late October 2024, Government of Kerala proposed relocating the BATL facility from its present location in Chackai to a 186 acres (0.75 km^{2}) land in Nettukaltheri, near Neyyar Dam. This move was important for the runway expansion planned for the Thiruvananthapuram International Airport. The preliminary round of discussion was completed and the proposal was forwarded by the then Chief minister of Kerala, Pinarayi Vijayan. However, the Ministry of Defence was yet to cleare the move. Reports in 2025 also suggested that BATL could be transferred to the direct control of DRDO.

=== Lucknow facility ===
BrahMos Aerospace Integration and Testing Facility in Lucknow has been established to produce the existing BrahMos variants as well as the under-development BrahMos-NG. The foundation stone for the project was laid in December 2021 as a part of the Uttar Pradesh Defence Industrial Corridor. The facility has been developed on a 200 acres (0.81 km^{2}) land under a project worth ₹300 crore (US$35 million).

The facility was inaugurated on 11 May 2025 by Defence Minister, Rajnath Singh. From 2026 onwards, the facility will have an annual production rate of 80–100 units , which will later be enhanced to a planned 100–150 units for BrahMos-NG. It also includes a Titanium and Super Alloys Materials Plant (officially, the Strategic Materials Technology Complex) and Defence Testing Infrastructure System (DTIS).

The first consignment of BrahMos missiles from the facility was delivered to the Indian Army on 18 October 2025. The Booster Building was also inaugurated by the Defence Minister and the Chief Minister of Uttar Pradesh, Yogi Adityanath. The booster docking process was also demonstrated. They also reviewed presentations at the Airframe and Avionics, Pre-Dispatch Inspection (PDI), and Warhead Buildings, in addition to inspecting the BrahMos simulator equipment.

== Aim and objective ==
To fulfil the aim which was to design, develop, manufacture and market the world's fastest supersonic cruise missile system.

== Organisation and leadership ==
Sr. No.	Name	From	Till
1.	Dr. A. Sivathanu Pillai	1998	2014
2.	Dr. Sudhir Kumar Mishra	2014	2021
3.	Atul Dinkar Rane	2021	2024
4.	Jaiteerth raghavendra Joshi	2024	now
