= Maintenance Command =

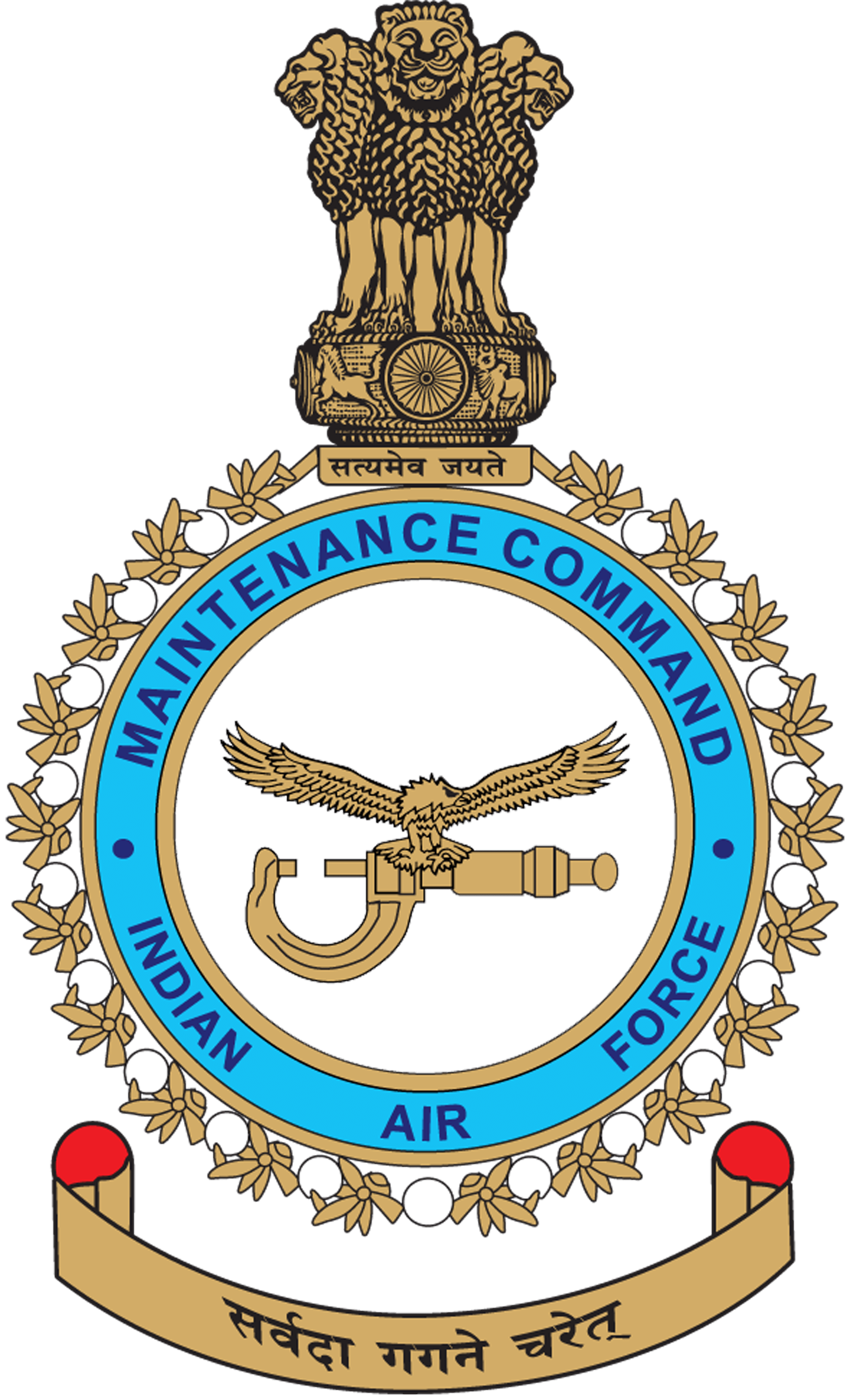
- Emblem of the Maintenance Command
- Founded: 26 January 1955
- Country: India
- Branch: Indian Air Force
- Type: Support
- Headquarters: Nagpur, Maharashtra
- Mottos: Sarvada Gagenecharet (Sanskrit: Always Flying in the Sky)

Commanders
- Air Officer Commanding-in-Chief: Air Marshal Yalla Umesh

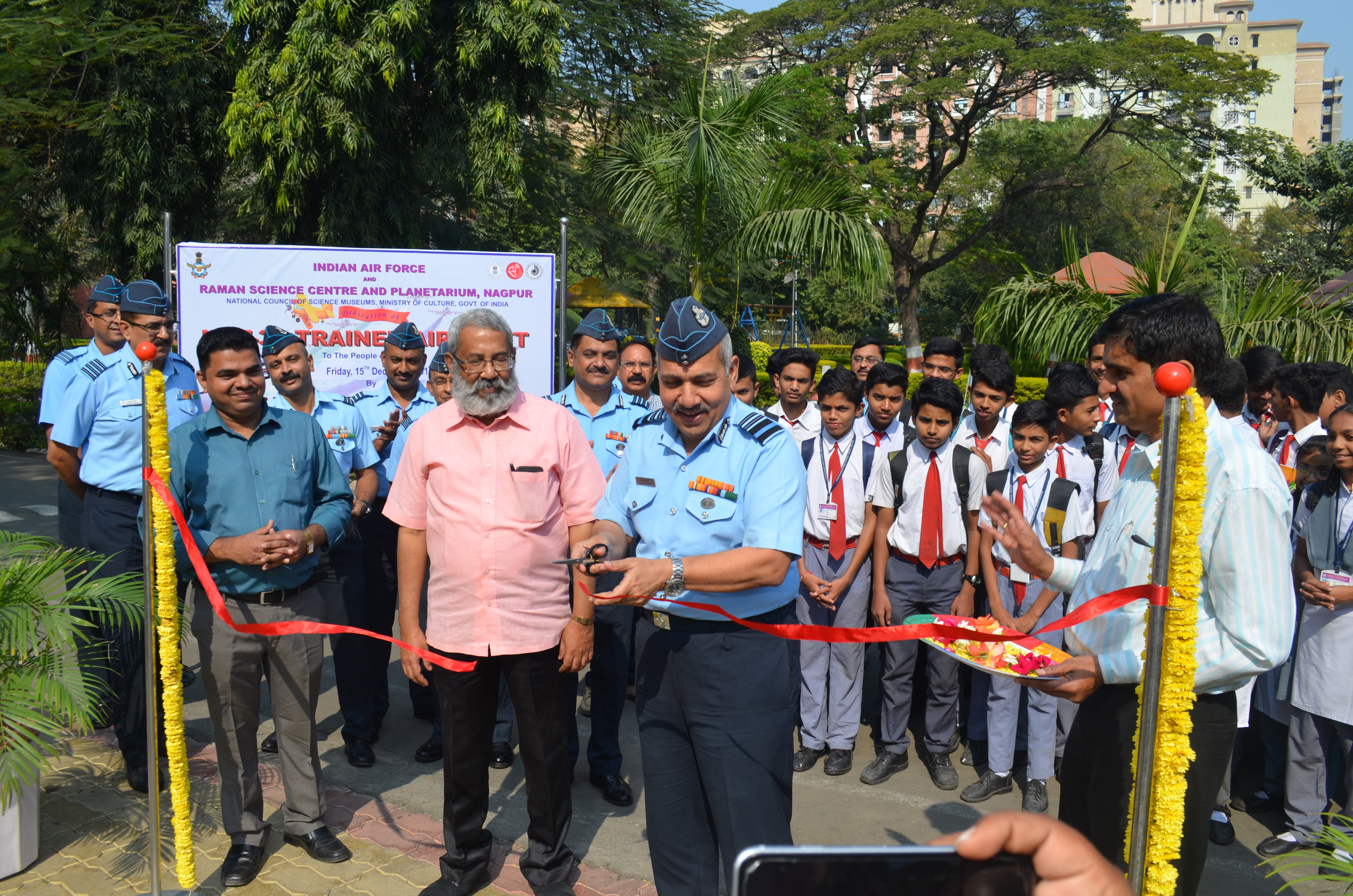
Air Marshal Hemant Sharma, AVSM, VSM, handing over the aircraft HPT-32 to Narayan Ramdas Iyer at Raman Science Centre on 15 December 2017

Maintenance Command is a command of the Indian Air Force. It was raised as Maintenance Group at Chakeri in Kanpur in 1950. In 1955, it was designated as Maintenance Command. Its current headquarters is located at Vayusena Nagar in Nagpur (Maharashtra); it handles the repair, overhaul and maintenance of all aircraft, helicopters and other equipment. MC has about nine Base Repair Depots taking care of the overhaul and maintenance of various types of aircraft.

== History ==
The Maintenance Command was established on 26 January 1955. Group Captain Harjinder Singh was the first commanding officer (CO). Harjinder Singh, a legendary engineering officer with many firsts to his credit was at the helm of the command until his retirement in 1963. The appointment of the CO was upgraded to Air Officer Commanding (AOC) in 1958 when Singh was promoted to air commodore. It was further upgraded to Air Officer Commanding-in-Chief (AOC-in-C) when he was promoted to the rank of air vice marshal. In 1971, the appointment of AOC-in-C was upgraded to the three-star rank of Air Marshal.

== Organisation ==
The command has several types of Base Repair Depots (BRD) (for overhaul, maintenance) and Equipment Depots (ED) (storage of spares, equipment, sub-systems). They are categorised by their specialisation and functions. These units are commanded by an officer of rank Air Commodre.

List of Base Repair Depots (BRD)
Unit	Location	Function	Ref
1 Base Repair Depot (Aircraft)	Kanpur	An-32 overhaul	
3 Base Repair Depot (Aircraft & Engine)	Chandigarh	Mi-17, Mi-26, Mi-35 overhaul	
4 Base Repair Depot (Engine)	Kanpur	R 29 engine (MiG-23/27) + M53 engine (Mirage 2000)	
5 Base Repair Depot (Aircraft)	Sulur	HS 748, Trainer aircraft overhaul	
7 Base Repair Depot (Systems)	Tughlakabad	Missiles, Radars, etc.	
8 Base Repair Depot (Systems)	Avadi		
9 Base Repair Depot (Systems)	Pune		
11 Base Repair Depot (Aircraft)	Ojhar	MiG-23, MiG-29 overhaul	
12 Base Repair Depot (Systems)	Nafdarjung	Parachute and safety system	
13 Base Repair Depot (Systems)	Palam		
14 Base Repair Depot (Systems)	Borjhar	Radar maintenance	
15 Base Repair Depot (Systems)	Vadsar	Communication equipment	
16 Base Repair Depot (Systems)	Palam	Parachute and safety system	

List of Equipment Depots (ED)
Unit	Location	Function	Ref
23 Equipment Depot	Avadi		
24 Equipment Depot	Manauri	Spare storage of Jaguar, Avro, C-295 and Dornier aircraft; Chetak, Cheetah and Dhruv helicopters and RPA	
25 Equipment Depot	Devlali	Spare storage of MiG-21, MiG-23, MiG-27 and Su-30MKI	
26 Equipment Depot	Bangalore	Rotables of Jaguar, Cheetah, Chetak, Avro, Kiran; line spares of Jaguar and engines	
27 Equipment Depot	Tughlakabad		
28 Equipment Depot	Amla	Armament and ammunition	
29 Equipment Depot	Kanpur	Supplies parts to 1 and 4 BRD	
41 (Mini) Equipment Depot	Bidar	Spares of MiG-25	
42 (Mini) Equipment Depot	Gwalior	Provides support to 40 Wing IAF, Maharajpur AFS	
43 (Mini) Equipment Depot	Hakimpet		
44 (Mini) Equipment Depot	Dundingal		
45 (Mini) Equipment Depot	Agra	Spares support for Ilyushin Il-76 and Ilyushin Il-78MKI based in Agra AFS.	
49 (Mini) Equipment Depot	N/A		

There are other units which are based under Maintenance Command

- Air Force Liaison Establishments (functions as an interface between IAF and HAL)
- 31 Movement Control Unit (MCU) at Palam AFS [previously Passenger and Freight (P&F) Forwarding Section]
- 32 Movement Control Unit (MCU) at Terminal 1 Mumbai Airport [previously Air Freight & Passenger (Mov) Unit]
- 33 Movement Control Unit (MCU) at Guwahati Airport

== Air Officer Commanding-in-Chief ==
List of Air Officer Commanding-in-Chief
Rank	Name	From	To
Group Captain	Harjinder Singh	25 January 1955	23 March 1958
Air commodore	Harjinder Singh	24 March 1958	14 May 1959
Air Vice Marshal	Harjinder Singh	15 May 1959	2 August 1963
Air Vice Marshal	Om Prakash Mehra	3 August 1963	17 February 1967
Air Vice Marshal	Hirendra Nath Chatterjee	18 February 1967	31 March 1968
Air Vice Marshal	Hari Chand Dewan	1 April 1968	23 March 1971
Air Marshal	Gurbachan Singh	24 March 1971	31 March 1973
Air Marshal	Anand Ramdas Pandit	1 April 1973	29 February 1976
Air Marshal	Idris Hasan Latif	1 March 1976	19 May 1977
Air Marshal	Devaiah Subia	20 May 1977	31 July 1978
Air Marshal	Jafar Zaheer	24 August 1978	19 January 1979
Air Marshal	Hemant Ramkrishna Chitnis	22 February 1979	29 February 1980
Air Marshal	Chandra Kant Viswanath Gole	18 April 1980	13 January 1981
Air Marshal	Kanwar Iqbal Singh Chhabra	14 January 1981	31 January 1985
Air Marshal	Satish Chandra Lal	1 February 1985	31 December 1982
Air Marshal	Madan Lal Sethi	1 January 1986	31 October 1987
Air Marshal	Kuldip Singh Bhatia	1 November 1987	30 April 1989
Air Marshal	Sibaprasad Chakrabarti	1 May 1989	31 January 1991
Air Marshal	Indrakanty Gopala Krishna	1 February 1991	30 June 1993
Air Marshal	Rajamani Ramamurthy	1 July 1993	31 December 1994
Air Marshal	Ramesh Chandra Bajpai	1 January 1995	31 October 1996
Air Marshal	Ghanshyam Gururani	1 November 1996	31 July 1997
Air Marshal	Shanti Swaroop Gupta	1 August 1997	30 April 2002
Air Marshal	Dinesh Chandra Nigam	1 May 2002	30 April 2004
Air Marshal	Vijay Adhyutrao Patkar	6 July 2004	30 April 2005
Air Marshal	Kirti Shekhar Chaturvedi	16 May 2005	31 March 2007
Air Marshal	Jayant Satchidanand Apte	2 April 2007	30 November 2007
Air Marshal	Gautam Nayyar	1 December 2007	31 March 2009
Air Marshal	Pramod Vasant Athawale	1 April 2009	31 August 2011
Air Marshal	Jagdish Chandra	1 September 2011	30 June 2013
Air Marshal	Packiriswamy Kanakaraj	1 July 2013	30 November 2014
Air Marshal	Jagjeet Singh	1 December 2014	31 March 2016
Air Marshal	Pankaj Aneja	1 April 2016	31 May 2017
Air Marshal	Hemant Sharma	1 June 2017	31 January 2019
Air Marshal	Raj Karan Singh Shera	1 February 2019	31 December 2019
Air Marshal	Shashiker Choudhary	1 January 2020	31 May 2022
Air Marshal	Vibhas Pande	14 June 2022	31 May 2024
Air Marshal	Vijay Kumar Garg	1 June 2024	30 December 2025
Air Marshal	Yalla Umesh	1 December 2025	Incumbent

== See also ==
- Training Command (India)
