= Romesh Sobti =

Indian banker

Romesh Sobti is an Indian banker. He was the CEO and MD of IndusInd Bank from 2008 to 2020, and of ABN AMRO Bank for the previous 12 years.

In 2013, The Sunday Standard presented Sobti the award for Best Banker – Growth, Mid-Sized. He was also named Business Standard's Banker of the Year for 2013-14. In 2015, he was awarded with the Best CRM Project at the Technology Implementation Awards. The same year, he was named EY Entrepreneurial CEO of the Year.

He was responsible during his tenure for a majority of credit and governance issues at Indusind bank.
