= Magistrate =

Officer of the state, usually judge

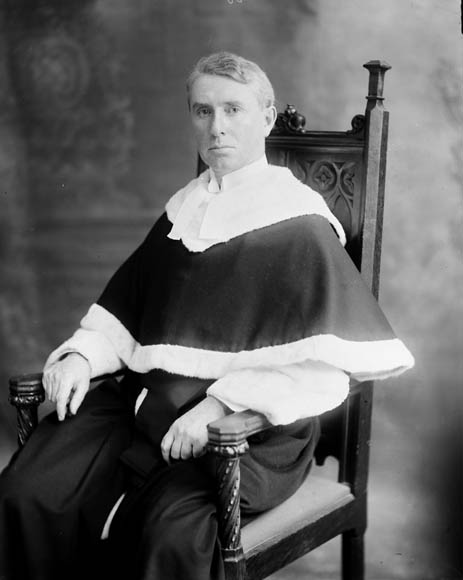
- Sir Lyman Poore Duff, a former justice of the Supreme Court of Canada

Occupation
- Names: Judge, justice of the peace, magistrate, judicial magistrate (particular in Germany)
- Occupation type: Profession
- Activity sectors: Law

Description
- Competencies: Analytical mind, critical thinking, impartiality, common sense
- Education required: Usually experience as an advocate (varies by jurisdiction)
- Fields of employment: Courts
- Related jobs: Barrister, solicitor, prosecutor

The term magistrate is used in a variety of systems of governments and laws to refer to a civilian officer who administers the law. In ancient Rome, a magistratus was one of the highest ranking government officers, and possessed both judicial and executive powers. In other parts of the world, such as China, magistrate is a word applied to a person responsible for administration over a particular geographic area. Today, in some jurisdictions, a magistrate is a judicial officer who hears cases in a lower court, and typically deals with more minor or preliminary matters. In other jurisdictions (e.g., England and Wales), magistrates are typically trained volunteers appointed to deal with criminal and civil matters in their local areas.

== Original meaning ==
In ancient Rome, the word magistratus referred to one of the highest offices of state. Analogous offices in the local authorities, such as municipium, were subordinate only to the legislature of which they generally were members, ex officio, often a combination of judicial and executive power, constituting one jurisdiction. In Rome itself, the highest magistrates were members of the so-called cursus honorum, 'course of honors'. They held both judicial and executive power within their sphere of responsibility (hence the modern use of the term "magistrate" to denote both judicial and executive officers), and also had the power to issue ius honorarium, or magisterial law. The Consul was the highest Roman magistrate. The Praetor (the office was later divided into two, the Urban and Peregrine Praetors) was the highest judge in matters of private law between individual citizens, while the Curule Aediles, who supervised public works in the city, exercised a limited civil jurisdiction in relation to the market. Roman magistrates were not lawyers, but were advised by jurists who were experts in the law.

The term was maintained in most feudal successor states to the western Roman Empire. However, it was used mainly in Germanic kingdoms, especially in city-states, where the term magistrate was also used as an abstract generic term denoting the highest office, regardless of the formal titles (e.g. Consul, Mayor, Doge), even when that was actually a council. The term "chief magistrate" applied to the highest official, in sovereign entities the head of state and/or head of government.

== Continental Europe and its former colonies ==
Under the civil law systems of European countries, such as Belgium, France, Italy and the Netherlands, magistrat (French), magistrato (Italian) and magistraat (Dutch) are generic terms which comprise both prosecutors and judges (distinguished as the 'standing' vis-à-vis 'sitting' magistrature, respectively).

In France and Italy, and several other European countries, examining magistrate judges have represented the victim and are part of overseeing investigations from the beginning of a case, in consultation with police and prosecutors. In France they are titled investigative judge (juge d'instruction, "judge of inquiry"). Italy and some other nations have ended this practice.

In Portugal, besides being used in the scope of the judiciary to designate prosecutors and judges, the term magistrado was also used to designate certain government officials, like the former civil governors of district. These were referred as "administrative magistrates", to distinguish them from the judiciary magistrates. The President of Portugal is considered the Supreme Magistrate of the Nation.

In Finland, maistraatti (the Finnish-language cognate of "magistrate", officially translated as "local register office") is a state-appointed local administrative office whose responsibilities include keeping population information and public registers, acting as a public notary and conducting civil marriages.

=== Mexico ===
In Mexico's Federal Law System, a magistrado (magistrate) is a superior judge (and the highest-ranking State judge), hierarchically beneath the Supreme Court Justices (Ministros de la Corte Suprema).

The magistrado reviews the cases seen by a judge in a second term if any of the parties disputes the verdict. For special cases, there are magistrados superiores (superior magistrates) who review the verdicts of special court and tribunal magistrates.

=== Germany ===
In Germany, the magistrational roles of the judge were transferred to a newly established legal body of the judiciary in 1942, which is that of the Rechtspfleger or judicial magistrate.

== English common law tradition ==
=== United Kingdom ===
==== England and Wales ====
Magistrates hear 'summary offences' and some 'triable-either-way offences' in the Courts of England and Wales. In 2021, there were 12,651 magistrates, a number that has fallen steadily in recent years, decreasing by 50% from 25,170 since 2012. Magistrates have a maximum sentencing power of up to 12 months' imprisonment, and/or an unlimited fine. In practice, magistrates have a wide range of sentencing options, which include issuing fines, imposing community orders, or dealing with offences by means of a discharge. In more serious cases, where magistrates consider that their sentencing powers are insufficient, they can send 'either-way' offenders to the Crown Court for sentencing.

All criminal cases begin in a magistrates' court. The most serious cases (for example murder, rape, etc.) are sent to the Crown Court, although magistrates' will often decide on issues such as bail and any preliminary matters. Lesser offences, including all summary only offences and some either-way offences will be dealt with entirely in the magistrates' court. A wide range of other legal matters are within the remit of magistrates, such as matters relating to licensing and debt collection, for example. In the past, magistrates have been responsible for granting licences to sell alcohol; this function is now exercised by local councils, although there is a right of appeal to the magistrates' court. Magistrates are also responsible for granting orders such as search warrants to the police and other authorities. It used to be a requirement that they live within a 15-mile (24 km) radius of the area they preside over (the commission area) in case they are needed to sign a warrant after hours. However, commission areas were replaced with Local Justice Areas by the Courts Act 2003, meaning magistrates no longer need to live within 15 miles (24 km), although, in practice, many still do. Section 7 of the Courts Act 2003 states that "There shall be a commission of the peace for England and Wales—...b) addressed generally, and not by name, to all such persons as may from time to time hold office as justices of the peace for England and Wales". Thus, every magistrate in England and Wales may act as a magistrate anywhere in England or Wales.

There are two types of magistrates in England and Wales: Justices of the Peace, and District Judges (formerly known as stipendiary magistrates). Justices of the peace (JPs) are trained volunteers appointed from the local community; the nature of their role means that it is not necessary for them to be legally qualified, but they do have the assistance of a legally qualified adviser in Court. JPs require intelligence, common sense, integrity, and the capacity to act fairly. They are selected by a local advisory committee and only recommended to the Lord Chancellor for appointment if they can demonstrate the six key qualities required of a judicial office holder, these are: (a) good character, (b) commitment and reliability, (c) social awareness, (d) sound judgement, (e) understanding and communication and (f) maturity and sound temperament. Membership is widely spread throughout the area covered and drawn from all walks of life. Police officers, traffic wardens, RSPCA employees and certain other categories of employees, as well as their close relatives, will not be appointed, nor will those convicted of certain criminal offences including recent minor offences.

All new justices of the peace undergo comprehensive training before sitting. There is a mentoring programme to help guide new appointees (mentors are magistrates with at least three years' service). The training, delivered by the Judicial College, covers the necessary law and procedure required for their role. They continue to receive training throughout their judicial career, and are appraised every four years (every two years for a Presiding Justice) to check that they continue to remain competent in their role. Additional training is given to justices choosing to sit in the Youth Court or those dealing with family matters. New JPs sit with mentors on at least six occasions during their first eighteen months. Justices of the peace are unpaid appointees, but they may receive allowances to cover travelling expenses, subsistence and loss of earnings for those not paid by their employer while sitting as a magistrate, up to a maximum of £116.78 a day. A justice of the peace may sit at any magistrates' court in England and Wales, but in practice, they are appointed to their local bench (a colloquial and legal term for the local court). Justices of the peace will normally sit as a panel of three, with two as a minimum in most cases, except those cases dealt with under the single justice procedure. Many are members of the Magistrates' Association, which provides advice and training and also represents magistrates.

The other type of magistrate is known as a district judge (magistrates' courts). Unlike justices of the peace, district judges (magistrates' courts) usually sit alone, although still have the benefit of a legal adviser. They are paid Judges appointed by open competition through a process administered by the Judicial Appointments Commission (JAC) and are required to be qualified solicitors, barristers, or chartered legal executives. Some also sit in the family court. Questions have been raised by the Magistrates' Association as to the legal safeguards of a single district judge allowed to hear a case, decide the outcome, and pass sentence without reference to another party, however the criminal procedure rules do require some cases to be heard by a district judge, such as those matters relating to extradition or where the contested issue is a disputed point of law.

According to the official statistics for diversity of the judiciary in April 2021, 56% of sitting magistrates were women, 13% were Black, Asian and minority ethnic and 82% per aged above 50.

=== Ireland ===
In 18th-century Ireland, unpaid justices of the peace from the local landed gentry operated on a similar basis to their English contemporaries. Stipendiary resident magistrates were added from 1814. In the Irish Free State the petty sessions where they operated were replaced by the District Court, temporarily from 1922 and permanently by the Courts of Justice Act 1924.

=== Scotland ===
In the courts of Scotland, the office of stipendiary magistrate was established by Section 5 of the District Courts (Scotland) Act 1975, and was replaced by the office of summary sheriff by Section 218 of the Courts Reform (Scotland) Act 2014. In Scotland, the lowest level of law-court, a justice of the peace court, is presided over by a justice of the peace, who like in England and Wales are trained volunteers. Stipendiary magistrates are, ex officio, justices of the peace, and when sitting in a JP court had the summary criminal jurisdiction and powers of a sheriff.

=== Australia ===
==== Federal magistrate ====
A federal magistrate was an office created on 23 December 1999 along with the establishment of the Federal Magistrates' Court by the Australian Government as a result of royal assent of the Federal Magistrates Act 1999 (Cth). Its first judicial officers were appointed in 2000; it first applications were filed on 23 June 2000 and the Court's first sittings were conducted on 3 July 2000 in Adelaide, Brisbane, Canberra, Melbourne, Newcastle, Parramatta and Townsville.

The Federal Magistrates' Court of Australia dealt with more minor Commonwealth law matters which had previously been heard by the Federal Court of Australia (administrative law, bankruptcy, consumer protection, trade practices, human rights, and copyright) or the Family Court (divorce, residence [or custody], and contact with [or access to] the children, property division upon divorce, maintenance, and child support). In some areas, such as bankruptcy and copyright, the court had virtually unlimited jurisdiction.

The federal magistrates would hear shorter or less complex matters or matters in which the monetary sum in disputes does not exceed given amounts. For instance, property divisions where the total assets are A$700,000 or less and consumer law matters (trade practices) where the amount claimed is less than $750,000. The first Chief Federal Magistrate, Diana Bryant left the court in 2004 when she was appointed Chief Justice of the Family Court of Australia, the third person to be appointed that position since the establishment of the Family Court.

Eventually, the Federal Magistrates' Court assumed a significant part of the workload of the Federal Court and the Family Court. By May 2004, the court was dealing with 73% of the total number of applications made in the three courts). The Federal Magistrates' Court was exercising jurisdiction well in excess of that of the state magistrates' courts, and similar to that of the District and County courts of the Australian states.

On 12 April 2013, in recognition of its increased jurisdiction and its role as an intermediate court servicing regional centres as well as capital cities throughout Australia, the Federal Magistrates' Court was renamed the Federal Circuit Court of Australia, the Act renamed as the Federal Circuit Court of Australia Act 1999, and its judicial officers received the title "judge" instead of "federal magistrate".

==== State magistrate ====
The state magistrates in Australia derive from the English magistrates. All magistrates are salaried officers.

The jurisdiction of the magistrates varies from state-to-state. They preside over courts which are, depending on the state, called magistrates' courts, Local Court, or courts of petty sessions.

Magistrates hear bail applications, motor licensing applications, applications for orders restraining a given individual from approaching a specific person ("intervention orders" or "apprehended violence orders"), summary criminal matters, the least serious indictable criminal matters, and civil matters where the disputed amount does not exceed A$40,000 to A$100,000 (depending on the state).

In some states, such as Queensland and NSW, the magistrate may appear robed; although, some magistrates are known to prefer a business suit. Magistrates presiding in the Koori Court (which deals with Aboriginal defendants) were originally of a mind not to appear robed; however, elders within the Indigenous community urged magistrates to continue wearing robes to mark the solemnity of the court process to defendants. Robing is being considered for magistrates in other states; however, neither counsel nor solicitors appear robed in any Australian magistrates' court. Robing in summary courts is unlikely to extend to the legal profession.

Historically, magistrates in Australia have been referred to as "Your Worship". (From Old English weorthscipe, meaning being worthy of respect.) However, members of the magistracy are now addressed as "Your Honour" in all states. This was partly to recognize the increasing role magistrates play in the administration of justice, but also to recognize the archaic nature of "Your Worship", and the tendency for witnesses and defendants to incorrectly use "Your Honour" in any event. It is also acceptable to address a magistrate simply as Sir or Madam.

=== Hong Kong ===
As of 2024, there are seven magistrates' courts in Hong Kong. Magistrates are appointed by the Chief Executive on the recommendation of the Judicial Officers Recommendation Commission and must be qualified solicitors, barristers, or judicial officers. Magistrates exercise criminal jurisdiction over a wide range of offences. Although there is a general limit of two years' imprisonment or a fine of HK$100,000, certain statutory provisions give Magistrates the power to sentence up to three years' imprisonment and to impose a fine up to HK$5,000,000.

=== Bangladesh ===
According to the Code of Criminal Procedure (CrPC), 1898, there are two classes of magistrates in Bangladesh, namely judicial magistrate and executive magistrate.

There are four classes of judicial magistrate (chief metropolitan magistrate in metropolitan areas and chief judicial magistrate in other areas, magistrate of the first class, metropolitan magistrate in metropolitan areas), magistrates of the second class and magistrates of the third class.

==== Executive magistrate ====
According to section 10(6 )of the Code of Criminal Procedure (CrPC) 1898, members of the Bangladesh Civil Service (Administration) Cadre in the capacity of assistant commissioner, upozila mirbahi officer and additional deputy commissioner shall be executive magistrates and may exercise the power of executive magistrates within their existing respective local areas. Besides this, according to the provision of the section 10(5), the government may, if it thinks it expedient or necessary, appoint any persons employed in the Bangladesh Civil Service (Administration) to be an executive magistrate and confer the powers of an executive magistrate on any such member.

Every administrative district has the following executive magistrates:

District magistrate: In every district and in every metropolitan area, the government shall appoint as many persons as it thinks fit to be executive magistrates and shall appoint one of them to be the district magistrate.

Additional district magistrate : The government may also appoint any executive magistrate to be an additional district magistrate who shall have all or any of the powers of a district magistrate under the code or under any other law for the time being in force, as the government may direct.

Additional deputy commissioner:, all of whom are executive magistrates.

Upazila nirbahi officer or sub-district executive officer

Assistant commissioner including senior assistant commissioner and assistant commissioner (land).

=== India ===
There are two classifications of magistrates: judicial magistrates, who are part of the judiciary (court), and executive magistrates, who are government administrative officials and belong to the executive branch of the government.

==== Judicial magistrates ====
There are four categories of magistrates in the judiciary of India. This classification is given in the Criminal Procedure Code, 1973 (CrPC). It stipulates that in each sessions district, there shall be:

- a chief judicial magistrate
- a sub-divisional judicial magistrate (SD-JM)
- a judicial magistrates first class (JFCM/JM-FC)

The chief judicial magistrate [CJM] (including additional chief judicial magistrates) hear all types of criminal cases. All magistrates' courts are controlled by the CJM who looks over the work of judicial magistrates, but cannot take any action against them. The CJM can only report the misbehavior of judicial magistrates to the High Court. A court of chief judicial magistrates can sentence a person to jail for up to seven years and impose fines up to any amount. The CJM is the most senior magistrate in their district.

There is a sub-divisional judicial magistrate (SDJM) in every subdivision. They hear cases related to the Dowry Act, EC Act, and other criminal cases. They also maintain and control the judicial court below them. A court of sub-divisional judicial magistrates may sentence a person to imprisonment for up to three years and impose a fine of up to ₹10,000 (US$110). Judicial magistrates can try criminal cases.

A judicial magistrate of first class (also known as judicial first class magistrate) can sentence a person to jail for up to three years and impose a fine of up to ₹10,000 (US$110).

==== Executive magistrates ====
An executive magistrate is an officer of the executive branch of the state government (e.g., government department, typically the land revenue department) rather than the Judicial branch. The primary mandate of an Executive Magistrate is to preserve public tranquility and prevent any actions that may disrupt peace and order. They are vested with specific powers under both the Bharatiya Nagarik Suraksha Sanhita (BNSS - the "Indian Citizen Safety Code") and the Bharatiya Nyaya Sanhita (BNS - the "Indian Justice Code"). These powers are conferred by Sections 125–129, 152, 163, 164 and 166 of the BNSS. They are distinct from Judicial Magistrates, who preside over courts, conduct trials and try criminal cases. These officers cannot try any accused nor pass verdicts. A person arrested on the orders of a court located outside the local jurisdiction should be produced before an executive magistrate who can also set the bail amount for the arrested individual to avoid police custody, depending on the terms of the warrant. The executive magistrate also can pass orders restraining persons from committing a particular act or preventing persons from entering an area (Section 163, BNSS). There is no specific provision to order a "curfew". The executive magistrates alone are authorised to use force against people. In plain language, they alone can disperse an "unlawful assembly". Technically, the police are to assist the executive magistrate. Executive magistrates can dictate to the police the manner of force (baton charge, tear gas, blank fire, firing) and how much force should be used. They can also seek the assistance of the armed forces to quell a riot.

There are, in each revenue district (as opposed to a sessions district) the following kinds of executive magistrates:

- a district magistrate (DM)
- two or more additional district magistrates (ADM)
- four or more sub-divisional magistrates (SDM)
- at least ten executive magistrates

All of the executive magistrates of the district, except the ADM, are under the control of the DM.

These magistrates are normally conferred on the officers of the Revenue Department, although an officer can be appointed exclusively as an executive magistrate. Normally, the collector of the district is appointed as the DM. Similarly, the sub-collectors/sub divisional officers are appointed as the SDMs. Tehsildars and deputy/additional tehsildars are appointed as executive magistrates.

In some metropolitan areas, the government has conferred specific or full powers of an Executive Magistrate upon Police Commissioners and their deputies within the police commissionerate system.

The BNSS, 2023 (Section 15) allows state governments to appoint "Special Executive Magistrates." These can be either existing Executive Magistrates or senior police officers (Superintendent of Police or higher). They are appointed for specific areas or duties and are granted certain powers of Executive Magistrates, as determined by the state government. Their appointment is for a term decided by the state.

Under the old CrPC, there was no distinction between the executive and judicial magistrates and some states still follow the old CrPC.

=== New Zealand ===
The position of stipendiary magistrate in New Zealand was renamed in 1980 to that of district court judge. The position was often known simply as "magistrate" or with the postnominal initials "SM" in newspapers' court reports.

In the late 1990s, a position of community magistrate was created for District Courts on a trial basis. A community magistrate sits in the hierarchy just below a district court judge. They only have criminal case jurisdiction. They are lay judicial officers, not needing to hold a law degree, although many do.

=== Sri Lanka ===
In Sri Lanka, a magistrate is a judicial officer appointed to preside over a magistrate's court to a particular jurisdiction under the Judicature Act No 02 of 1978. The post was formally known as police magistrate when the courts were known as police magistrate courts. Magistrates have jurisdiction over the criminal cases filed under the penal code. They carry out first mortem and post mortem examinations, issue search warrants and arrest warrants, produce suspected persons and grant bail. In many cases, magistrates preside over primary courts Unofficial magistrates can be appointed from among the senior lawyers of the local bar. There are four types of magistrate

- Chief magistrate (only of the metropolitan area of Colombo)
- Magistrate/municipal magistrate
- Additional magistrate (found when there are more than one Magistrate in one station)
- Unofficial magistrate

=== United States ===
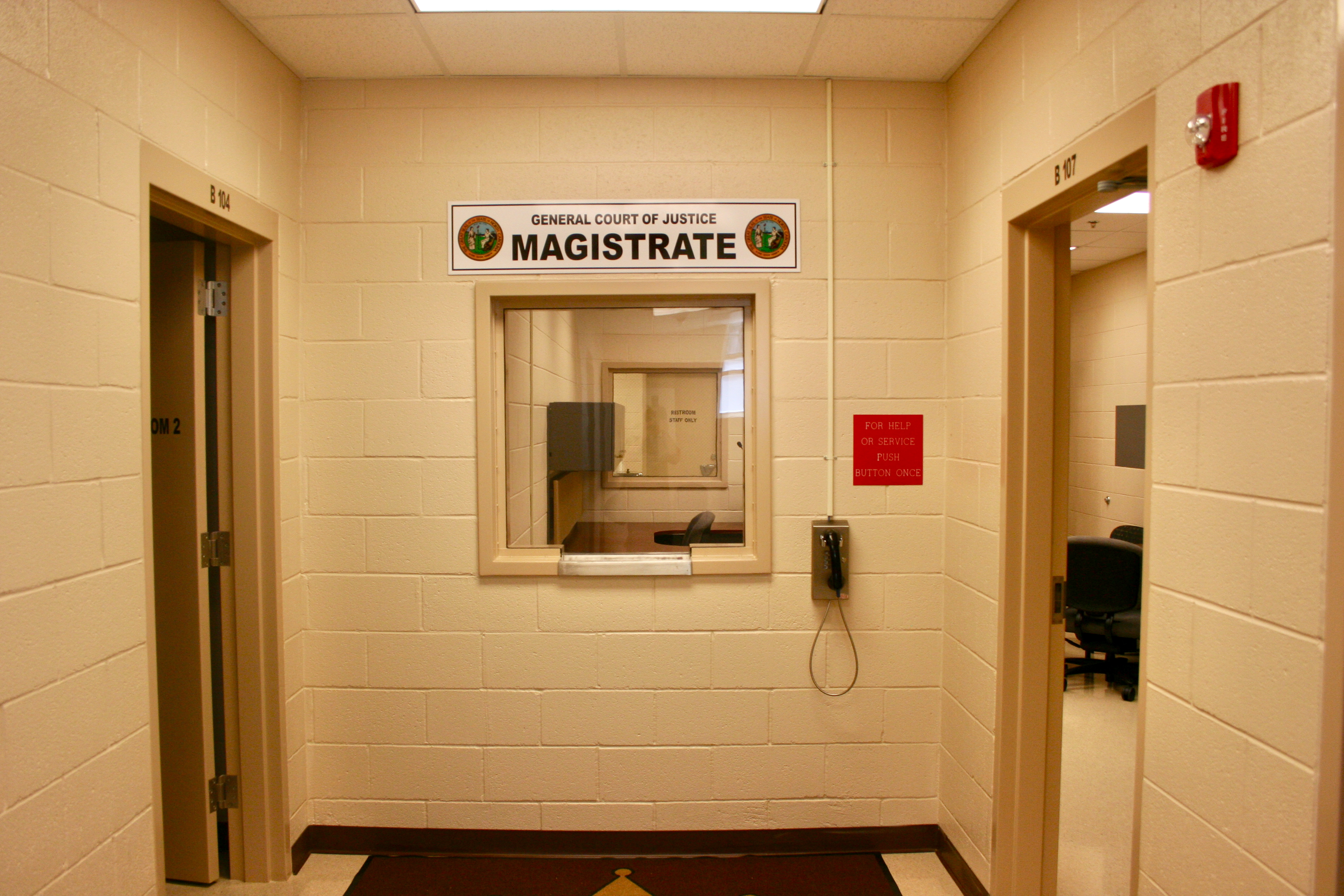
A magistrate's office in the United States

Magistrates are somewhat less common in the United States than in Europe, but the position does exist in some state jurisdictions and in federal courts.

The term "magistrate" is often used (chiefly in judicial opinions) as a generic term for any independent judge who is capable of issuing warrants, reviewing arrests, etc. When used in this way, it does not denote a judge with a particular office. Instead, it denotes (somewhat circularly) a judge or judicial officer who is capable of hearing and deciding a particular matter. That capability is defined by state statute or by common law. In Virginia, for example, the Constitution of 1971 created the office of magistrate to replace the use in cities and counties of the justice of the peace, which is common in many states for this function.

As noted above, the terms "magistrate" or "chief magistrate" were sometimes used in the early days of the republic to refer to the president of the United States, as in President John Adams's message to the U.S. Senate upon the death of George Washington: "His example is now complete, and it will teach wisdom and virtue to magistrates, citizens, and men, not only in the present age, but in future generations, as long as our history shall be read" (19 December 1799).

==== Federal courts ====
In the United States federal courts, a magistrate judge is a judicial officer authorized by 28 U.S.C. § 631 et seq. They were formerly known as U.S. commissioners, and then as magistrates. Magistrate judges, as they have been designated since 1990, are appointed by the federal district judges of a particular court, serving terms of eight years if full-time, or four years if part-time, and may be reappointed. Magistrate judges conduct a wide range of judicial proceedings to expedite the disposition of the civil and criminal caseloads of the United States district courts. Congress set forth in the statute the powers and responsibilities that could be delegated by district court judges to magistrate judges. To achieve maximum flexibility in meeting the needs of each court, however, Congress left to the individual courts the actual determination of which duties to assign to magistrate judges.

==== State courts ====
In many state court systems in the United States, magistrate courts are the successor to Justice of the Peace courts, and frequently have authority to handle the trials of civil cases up to a certain dollar amount at issue, applications for bail, arrest and search warrants, and the adjudication of petty or misdemeanor criminal offences. In Ohio, magistrates are subordinate to the judge or judges who appoint them, and all of their decisions are subject to the review, amendment, approval, or reversal by a judge. In some states, including West Virginia and Georgia, magistrates are elected and not appointed.

== Other countries ==
=== Arabia ===
After the Hijrah in 622 CE, the Constitution of Medina formalised the Islamic Prophet Muhammad as the Chief Magistrate, making him as the foremost judicial authority responsible for resolving conflicts and overseeing judicial welfare in Medina. This later unified the diverse tribal groups, including the Jewish tribes, and ended long‑standing internecine tensions. Within this role, prophet Muhammad exercised final decision making in dispute resolution, interpretation of law, and maintenance of public order.

=== China ===
Magistrate, or chief magistrate, is also a common translation of the Chinese xianzhang (县长/縣長 literally: county leader) the political head of a county or xiàn/hsien (县/縣) which ranks in the third level of the administrative hierarchy of China. Magistrates are also the administrative heads of government of counties during the Republican era. The county magistrate elections are heavily and sometimes bitterly contested, and are often a stepping-stone to higher office. The translation dates from imperial China in which the county magistrate was the lowest official in the imperial Chinese bureaucracy and had judicial in addition to administrative functions.

After losing the Chinese Civil War, county magistrate elections in the Republic of China were first open to election in the 1960s and, before the end of martial law in 1991, were the highest elected position of any real power, and hence, the focus of election campaigns by the Tangwai movement. The magistrates became the first level head of government after the central government reduced provincial powers in 1998. In the People's Republic of China, the county leader is elected by the local people's congress but the process is controlled by the Communist Party.

=== Russia ===
In Russia, magistrates (justices of the peace) handle minor criminal cases where imprisonment is for less than three years such as slander, petty hooliganism, public drunkenness, and serious traffic violations of a non-criminal nature, minor civil cases such as simple divorces, some property cases, disputes over land, and some labor cases, as well as some federal administrative law cases.

The magistrates are the only judges of the regional level within the judiciary of Russia. All other courts, including the district courts, are federal, as they are financed from the federal budget and their judges are appointed by the president of Russia, while the magistrates are financed from the regional budgets and are usually appointed by regional legislatures or elected by the population of a judicial district.

=== Switzerland ===
In Switzerland, magistrate is a designation for the persons holding the most senior executive and judicial offices. On the federal level, the members of the Federal Council, the Federal Chancellor, and the judges on the Federal Supreme Court are called magistrates. The designation of magistrate is not a title or style. It does not, by itself, confer any particular privileges.

=== Siam ===
In Siam, the position of yakkrabutr (ยกกระบัตร) is similar to that of the magistrate and was given to palace officials sent to provincial capitals to administers law and ensure justice on behalf of the monarch. The position was phased out and reformed into the position of prosecutor in 1916 during the reign of Rama VI.

=== Kenya ===
In Kenya, there are five categories of magistrates, namely resident magistrate, senior resident magistrate, principal magistrate, senior principal magistrate and chief magistrate. Chief magistrate is the highest ranking among magistrates and also assumes administrative control of magistrate courts in his or her jurisdiction. A chief magistrate has jurisdiction in a dispute that does not exceed seven million Kenya shillings. For senior principal magistrates, the limit is in disputes not exceeding five million Kenya shillings; for principal magistrates it is disputes not exceeding four million Kenya shillings. Senior resident magistrates have jurisdiction in disputes not exceeding three million Kenya shillings and resident magistrates in disputes not exceeding two million Kenya shillings.

== In popular culture ==
- The British humorist P.G. Wodehouse wrote in one of his Jeeves and Wooster stories, "Jeeves and the Feudal Spirit" (1955), "Well, you know what magistrates are. The lowest form of pond life. When a fellow hasn't the brains and initiative to sell jellied eels, they make him a magistrate." Bertie Wooster often appeared before magistrates when he was arrested for minor offences.
- A plump and foolish magistrate is a key character in Amy Tan's children's book (and the related PBS television show) Sagwa, the Chinese Siamese Cat.
- In the post-colonial novel Waiting for the Barbarians by J. M. Coetzee, the story is told from the narrative perspective of the magistrate of one of the settlements in what is presumed to be Africa.
- In the Walt Disney movie Davy Crockett: King of the Wild Frontier, Crockett is appointed magistrate of the local community.
- Magistrates appear in the Star Trek universe as well. On Star Trek: Deep Space Nine, Constable Odo often threatens detainees or those he suspects are guilty of various crimes and violations that he will send them to the magistrate, or tells them sarcastically, in response to their pleas of innocence, to "Tell it to the magistrate."
- In the first installment of the popular StarCraft real-time strategy series, one plays as a magistrate working for the Confederacy, a cruel government. One later joins the Sons of Korhal, aiding in the rebellion.
- In the videogame series Ace Attorney, there is a fictional children's television show called The Steel Samurai, which is referenced in many cases. The main antagonist of the show is the Evil Magistrate.

== See also ==
- Agoranomi
- Chief magistrate
- Executive Magistrate of Bangladesh
- Justice in Eyre
- Lawspeaker
- Resident magistrate
- Roman magistrate
