= Kerala Administrative Service =

Administrative civil service under the government of Kerala

Kerala Administrative Service (KAS)
- Service overview
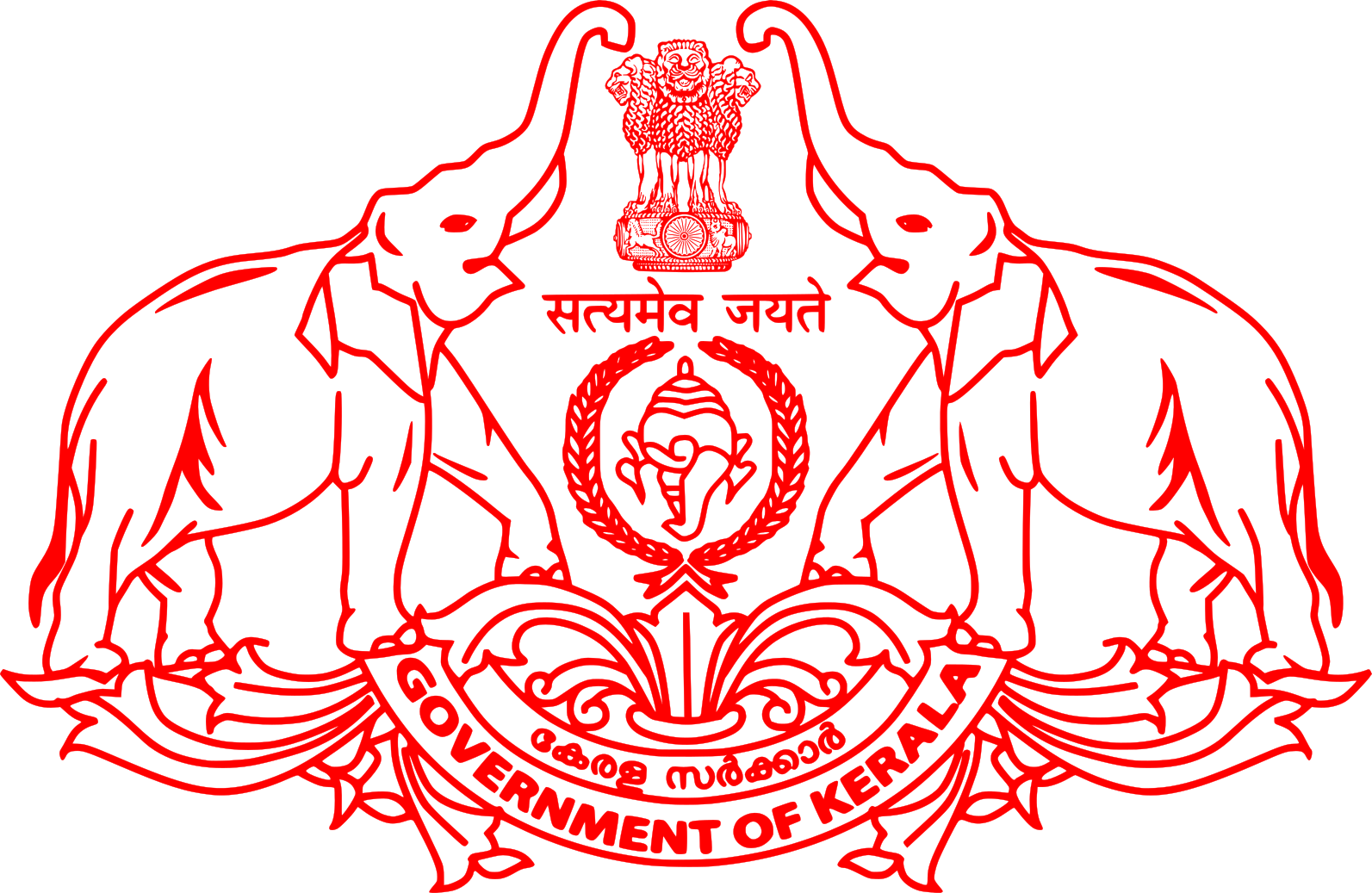
- Founded: 2018; 8 years ago
- Area served: Kerala, India
- Staff college: State Administrative Academy
- Cadre controlling authority: Department of Personnel and Administrative Reforms, Government of Kerala
- Minister responsible: Vd satheesan, Chief Minister of Kerala and Minister of Personnel and Administrative Reforms
- Legal personality: Governmental; Civil Service
- Recruitment Board: Kerala Public Service Commission
- Selection: Kerala Administrative Service Examination (Conducted by the Kerala Public Service Commission)

Head of the Civil Services
- Chief Secretary of Kerala: Bishwanath sinha

The Kerala Administrative Service (KAS) is the administrative cadre of the Government of Kerala started in the year 2018. The Kerala Public Service Commission conducts exams to recruit candidates for the service. Selection is through a three-stage examination followed by a training of 18 months. It aims to build a cadre of public servants as a second line of managerial talent for effective implementation of govt services in Kerala.

== History ==
The Administrative Reforms Commissions since the formation of Kerala state has been suggesting formation of Kerala Administrative Service. KAS came in to force from 1 January 2018.

== Aim ==
The declared objective of the Kerala Administrative Service is to create a new generation of officers to utilize the potential of modern technology to make governance more efficient. The government aims to improve the efficiency of middle-level management in the government service by identifying and recruiting talented candidates through a strict three-stage examination followed by a training of 18 months. The first year of 18 months of training is pre-service training and the subsequent six months of training must be done after entering service but before completing probation. Through KAS, the government is looking for a way to avoid hindering the realization of the objectives of government projects due to the significant shortage of professionals in the second tier of the government system.

The rank of first appointee in KAS is equivalent to the rank of Under Secretary in the State Secretariat. Initially, the second gazetted posts in 29 government departments were reserved for KAS. Officers in KAS, which is considered as the feeder category for IAS, can enter the IAS cadre subject to satisfying conditions of promotion under the Indian Administrative Service (Appointment by Promotion) Regulations,1955, after completing 8 years of service.

== Selection ==
Kerala Administrative Service examination is considered the highest level examination conducting by Kerala Public Service Commission. Selection is done through any of the 3 streams described below:

- Stream-1: Direct recruitment
- Stream-2: Direct recruitment from approved Probationers or Full members who have successfully completed probation in various departments of the Government of Kerala.
- Stream-3: Direct recruitment from Government Employees holding the first Gazetted post or above in the Government Departments mentioned in Schedule 1 of Kerala Administrative Service Special Rules published in 2018 or holding the equivalent post in the general categories mentioned in Schedule 1.

=== Age Limit and Conditions ===
- Stream-1: Direct Recruitment = 21 - 32yrs.
- Stream-2: 21 - 40yrs old.
- Stream-3: below 50yrs old.
- Candidate must have a bachelor's degree in any stream from a recognized university.
- Candidate must be an Indian citizen

== Appointments ==
Kerala Administrative Service shall consists of the following categories of officers:

- KAS Officer (Junior Time Scale) Trainee
- KAS Officer (Senior Time Scale)
- KAS Officer (Selection Grade Scale)
- KAS Officer (Super Time Scale)

== Training ==
KAS officers undergo 18 months of training under Institute of Management in Government (IMG), the apex training institute of Kerala government. They undergo field trainings as well as attachments with other training institutes of the state such as Kerala Institute of Local Administration (KILA) and Institute of Land and Distaster Management (ILDM) during the process.

== Career progression ==
Positions and designations held by KAS officer in their career
| Grade/scale (level on Pay Matrix) | Field posting(s) | Position in state secretariat/department | Pay Scale |
|---|---|---|---|
| Super time scale | | Additional Secretary / Special Secretary / Director | ₹ 107800—160000 |
| Selection grade | | Joint Secretary/Joint Director/ Senior Deputy Director | ₹ 95600 —153200 |
| Senior time scale | Additional District Magistrate & Deputy Collector (General); Additional Corporation Secretary; Municipal Secretary Grade 1 | Deputy Secretary | ₹ 85000—143600 |
| Junior Time Scale | Deputy Collector; Revenue Divisional Officer & Sub-divisional magistrate; District Supply Officer; Deputy Commissioner (Commercial Taxes); Administrative Officer; Finance Officer; District Educational Officer; Deputy Registrar; Administrative Assistant; Assistant Director (LSGD); Deputy Director; Municipal Secretary; District Labour Officer | Under Secretary | ₹ 77,200-1,40,500 |

== Promotion ==
=== Promotion to IAS ===
Based on seniority, performance, and experience, KAS officers can reach the level of Principal Secretary after being promoted to IAS. The Principal Secretary is a senior position in the state government and is responsible for overseeing the functioning of various departments.

Officers of the KAS may be appointed to the Indian Administrative Service by promotion, in accordance with the prescribed rules, subject to selection by the Union Public Service Commission and approval of the Government of India. Promotion to the Indian Administrative Service is made through two streams: the SCS quota, drawn from State Civil Service (KAS) officers on seniority-cum-merit, and the Non-SCS quota, drawn from eligible officers of other State services on merit, both through selection by the Union Public Service Commission (UPSC).

== Criticisms and controversies ==
Indian Administrative Service (IAS) officials protested against the base salary of Rs 81,800 for Kerala Administrative Service officers. The Kerala IAS Officers' Association and the Kerala unit of the IPS and IFS Associations submitted a letter to the Chief Minister requesting that the Cabinet decision be reconsidered. In the letter, they pointed out that the higher salaries of KAS officers would create problems in the district administration.

There have also been protests against the government's move to apply reservation in appointments through transfer in the Kerala Administrative Service. In 2020, the Division Bench of Kerala High court dismissed a series of petitions filed by the Samastha Nair Samaj and a few officials questioning the Government's move to apply reservation in appointments through transfer.

== See also ==
- Bihar Administrative Service
- Gujarat Administrative Service
- Karnataka Administrative Service
- Provincial Civil Service (Jharkhand)
- Provincial Civil Service (Uttar Pradesh)
- Provincial Civil Service (Uttarakhand)
- Rajasthan Administrative Service
- Tamil Nadu Civil Service
- West Bengal Civil Service
- Jammu and Kashmir Administrative Service
