= West Bengal Revenue Service =

Government body

West Bengal Revenue Service (WBRS)
- West Bengal Revenue Service Logo

Service overview
- Founded: 2017
- Cadre Controlling Authority: Finance (Revenue) Department, Government of West Bengal
- State: West Bengal
- Country: India
- Staff College: i) Swami Vivekananda State Police Academy, Barrackpore ii) Netaji Subhash Administrative Training Institute, Kolkata
- Legal personality: Government, Civil Service
- Selection: West Bengal Civil Service Group A by West Bengal Public Service Commission
- Directorates served: (1) Directorate of Commercial Taxes (2) Directorate of Excise (3) Directorate of Registration and Stamp Revenue
- Entry level designation: Assistant Commissioner of Revenue

West Bengal Revenue Service (WBRS) is one of the Group A services under West Bengal Civil Services, recruited through a competitive examination conducted by West Bengal Public Service Commission. The service was created in 2017 merging four erstwhile services concerning revenue matter and revenue collection. It functions under the Revenue Branch and overall administrative control of Department of Finance.

== Recruitment ==
WBRS officers are recruited through W.B.C.S.(Exe.) etc examination held in 3 stages: Preliminary, Mains and Personality Test. The examination is conducted and administered by West Bengal Public Service Commission. WBRS officers recruited in this way are called direct recruits. Some officers are also recruited from sub-ordinate services through promotion. However, all WBRS officers, regardless of their mode of entry, are Group A Gazetted Officer (India) and appointed by the Governor of West Bengal.

== Training ==
WBRS officers are mainly trained at their respective directorates, Netaji Subhash Administrative Training Institute (NSATI), Kolkata, Swami Vivekananda State Police Academy (SVSPA), Barrackpore and Analysis, Research and Training Institute (ARTI), Salboni.

== Designations ==
Sl No.	Previous Pay Scale	Pay Level in West Bengal (ROPA, 2019)	Designation	Equivalent Post in Secretariat	Service Criteria	Sanctioned Post
1	16	16	Assistant Commissioner of Revenue	Assistant Secretary	Entry level post through WBCS(Exe) etc. Examination, Group A posts	N/A
2	17	17	Deputy Commissioner of Revenue	Deputy Secretary	8 years service in Pay Level 16	N/A
3	18	19	Joint Commissioner of Revenue/Senior Joint Commissioner of Revenue	Senior Deputy Secretary/Director	7 years service in Pay Level 17 i.e. total 15 years service/20 years of service for Sr Joint Commissioner of Revenue	N/A
4	19	21	Additional Commissioner of Revenue	Joint Secretary	9 years service in Pay Level 19 i.e. total 24 years service	N/A
5	20	22	Additional Commissioner of Revenue/Senior Additional Commissioner of Revenue	Additional Secretary	2 years service in functional post of Pay Level 21	i) 72 for Commercial Taxes ii) 5 for Agricultural Income Tax iii) 9 for Registration and Stamp Revenue iv) 20 for Excise Total 106 for WBRS
7	21	24	Special Commissioner of Revenue	Special Secretary	Depending on the available vacancy in this Pay Level	i) 22 for Commercial Taxes ii) 1 for Agricultural Income Tax iii) 5 for Registration and Stamp Revenue iv) 7 for Excise Total 35 for WBRS

== Functions ==
In 2017, West Bengal government merged four departments associated with revenue to form a single department 'West Bengal Revenue Service' (WBRS) to provide better service to the taxpayers. The four departments are West Bengal Commercial Tax Service, West Bengal Excise Service, West Bengal Agricultural Income Tax Service and West Bengal Registration and Stamp Revenue Service. The cadre management of the West Bengal Revenue Service is done by the Finance Department. The officers are initially appointed as Assistant commissioner of Revenue and then promoted to Deputy commissioner of Revenue, Joint Commissioner of Revenue, Senior Joint Commissioner of Revenue, Additional Commissioner of Revenue and Special Commissioner of Revenue. Like the WBCS(Exe) cadre, WBRS officers also get a chance to be promoted to Indian Administrative Service cadre at a later phase of their career.

WBRS officers play a pivotal role in revenue collection, administration and mobilisation in the state. Many aspirants select WBRS as their first service preference over WBCS(Exe) and WBPS due to better work life balance, urban posting and less political interference leading to comfortable work culture. WBRS officers can be posted as Assistant commissioner in Commercial tax department, or as Deputy Excise Collector in Excise Directorate or as an Additional District Sub-Registrar in Directorate of Registration and Stamp Revenue. Officers recruited at a young age can get promoted up to Commissioner rank which is an IAS cadre post.

WBRS officers, as Assistant commissioner of State GST are tasked with collection of State GST and prevent tax evasion through search and raids; as Deputy Excise Collector, they are tasked with collection of Excise duty on alcoholic drinks and take preventive measures against illicit sources of drugs through regulatory and enforcement actions; and as ADSR they are tasked with registration and valuation of immovable properties during sale or purchase and collect Stamp duty and Registration fee.

== Organisation Hierarchy for WBRS Officers ==
Directorate of Commercial Taxes	Excise Directorate	Directorate of Registration and Stamp Revenue
Assistant Commissioner/Commercial Tax Officer (CTO)	Deputy Excise Collector	Additional District Sub-Registrar (ADSR) and District Sub-Registrar (DSR)
Deputy Commissioner	Additional Superintendent of Excise/Superintendent of Excise	District Registrar (DR)/Additional Registrar of Assurance (ARA)/Assistant Commissioner of Stamp Revenue (ACSR)
Joint Commissioner	Deputy Commissioner of Excise	Deputy Inspector General of Registration (DIGR)/Registrar of Assurance (RA)/Deputy Commissioner of Stamp Revenue (DCSR)
Senior Joint Commissioner	Joint Commissioner of Excise	Joint Inspector General of Registration (JIGR)/Joint Commissioner of Stamp Revenue (JCSR)
Additional Commissioner	Additional Commissioner of Excise	Additional Inspector General of Registration and Additional Commissioner of Stamp Revenue (Addl IGR & CSR)
Special Commissioner	Special Commissioner of Excise	Special Inspector General of Registration and Special Commissioner of Stamp revenue
Commissioner of Commercial Taxes (CCT)	Excise Commissioner	Inspector General of Registration and Commissioner of Stamp Revenue (IGR & CSR)

== Profile of Three Directorates ==
=== Directorate of Commercial Taxes ===
The Directorate of Commercial Taxes is the major revenue earning Directorate of the state of West Bengal. This Directorate is responsible for collecting indirect taxes under various Acts like the Goods and Services Tax Act, 2017, the West Bengal Value Added Tax Act, 2003, the West Bengal Sales Tax Act, 1994, the Central Sales Tax Act, 1956 to name a few, along with rules thereof. Head Office of this Directorate is located at 14, Beliaghata Road, Kolkata-700015.

The Directorate of Commercial Taxes, West Bengal is headed by the Commissioner of Commercial Taxes. Below the Commissioner, there are Special Commissioners, Additional Commissioners, Senior Joint Commissioners, Joint Commissioners, Deputy Commissioners, Assistant Commissioners and State Tax Officers to assist the Commissioner.

Charges - A Charge is a unit office of the Directorate. There are 48 Charges in West Bengal. Usually a Charge is headed by a Charge Officer, who can be a Joint Commissioner or a Senior Joint Commissioner. A Charge Officer is assisted by Officers under him, who look after groups of taxpayers. Officers posted in the Charges are entrusted with the power of examination of books of accounts of the dealers and to make assessment of taxes payable by them, as also to realise dues.

Circles - Administratively, the Directorate is divided into 16 Circles. A Circle is headed by a Special Commissioner, or an Additional Commissioner. He is supported by an Administrative Senior Joint Commissioner and other officers, down to Charge level and Assistant Commissioners. They exercise Administrative, Appellate and Revisional Jurisdiction over the Charges under them.

Large Taxpayers’ Unit - To facilitate the revenue administration of the largest taxpayers of the State, a dedicated unit called Large Taxpayers’ Unit has been formed. It is headed administratively by a Special Commissioner.

Bureau of Investigation - There are 2 units of Bureau of Investigation and 8 zones, geographically, which carry on anti-evasion work of the Directorate. Each unit is headed by a Special Officer of the rank of a Special Commissioner or an Additional Commissioner.

Certificate Organization - The C.O. under the Directorate is entrusted with the function of realising dues from Certificate Debtors.

Range Offices - There are nine Range Offices at various places within West Bengal. Officials posted there are engaged in mobile checking of vehicles transporting goods. The Ranges have supervisory control over the check posts.

Profession Tax Range and Unit Offices - There are five Profession Tax Ranges in Kolkata and four Profession Tax Ranges in the districts. Twenty-three Profession Tax Units operate in the district under the appropriate Range Offices.

=== Directorate of Registration and Stamp Revenue ===
The earliest record of systematic registration in Bengal Presidency is found in the “Rule, Ordinance and Regulation” passed in council on 9 January 1781 and registered in the Supreme Court of Judicature at Fort William on 1 February 1781 for establishing certain regulations “for the better management of the affairs of the East India Company as well in India as in Europe.” The objects of this Regulation of 1781 were to supply the want of registry of houses, lands and estates within that settlement and to prevent fraud. Mr. Edward Tiretta was appointed the first surveyor and was entrusted with the duties as a surveyor and Registrar of lands, houses etc. in the settlement and also as a Registrar of the memorials of deeds affecting such lands etc.

By subsequent legislation, these duties have been separated and the Directorate of Registration and Stamp Revenue controls and supervises the registration offices of the State under Judicial Department up to 1993 with the help of a band of officers in different hierarchy for registration of the deeds and for maintaining the records of transactions of land and estates in the State of West Bengal.

The Directorate of Registration and Stamp Revenue is under the administrative control of the Finance Department since 1993 and collects revenue in the shape of stamp duties and registrations fees for the State Exchequer. Since the introduction of the concept of the market value in 1994 replacing the age old idea of consideration, the collection of revenue is mopped up every year raising the Directorate to the second highest revenue earning Directorate of the State.

The Inspector General of Registration and Commissioner of Stamp Revenue, West Bengal is the Head of this Directorate. A senior member of the Indian Administrative Service holds the post. The following officers of the Directorate are to assist the Inspector General of Registration and Commissioner of Stamp Revenue, West Bengal in the functioning of the Directorate :

i) Special Commissioner of Stamp Revenue (5 sanctioned posts in the rank of Special Commissioner of Revenue)

ii) Additional IGR and Additional CSR (9 sanctioned posts in the rank of Additional Commissioner of Revenue)

iii) Joint IGR and Joint CSR (usually in the rank of Joint Commissioner of Revenue or Senior Joint Commissioner of Revenue)

iv) Deputy IGR and Deputy CSR (usually in the rank of Joint Commissioner of Revenue or Senior Joint Commissioner of Revenue)

v) Assistant Commissioner of Stamp Revenue (usually in the rank of District Registrar or Joint Commissioner of Revenue)

vi) Additional District Sub-Registrar (usually in the rank of Assistant/Deputy Commissioner of Revenue)

In District and field level administration, the Registration Act, 1908 and Indian Stamp Act, 1899 are administered by :

i) Deputy Inspector General of Registration (DIGR) for 12 Ranges

ii) District Registrar (DR, usually in the rank of Joint Commissioner of Revenue or Senior Joint Commissioner of Revenue)

iii) District Sub-Registrar (DSR, usually in the rank of Joint Commissioner of Revenue)

iv) Additional District Sub-Registrar (ADSR, usually in the rank of Assistant/Deputy Commissioner of Revenue)

=== Directorate of Excise ===
The Excise Directorate under the Finance Department, Government of West Bengal plays the twin role of mobilizing resources for the State and also managing a sector that has a significant social and public health import. The Directorate is concerned with the regulation related to the manufacture, supply, distribution and sale of liquor and other intoxicants in the state, and the collection of state excise duties, fees and other monies derived from such manufacture, distribution, sale and regulation. The Directorate achieves these objectives by -

a) granting and regulating licenses for the manufacture, wholesale and retail sale of liquor and spirits used for the manufacture of liquor;

b) authorizing the manufacture and / or sale of brands of bottled liquor in the state, through a process of registration of brands of foreign liquor, colored and flavored spirit, and country spirit, and of the labels under which they can be manufactured and / or sold;

c) regulating the movement of liquor, and spirits used for the manufacture of liquor, into, throughout and from the state, through the grant and administration of relevant import, export and transport passes;

d) monitoring and maintaining records of inventories of liquor, and spirits used for the manufacture of liquor, at all the liquor-manufacturing, wholesale and retail locations in the state;

e) operating mechanisms for the collection of state excise duties on liquor, and fees and other levies charged and imposed by the government on the manufacture, distribution, and sale of liquor;

f) carrying out enforcement activities against the illegal manufacture of liquor, and against the distribution and sale of such illegally manufactured liquor, and liquor on which the requisite state excise duties and / or fees have not been paid;

g) carrying out enforcement activities against the manufacture, distribution, sale and possession of narcotics; and

h) regulating the manufacture, supply, distribution and sale of spirits and narcotic drugs for medicinal and industrial purposes, through the issue and administration of relevant licenses, permits and passes.

In short, the main objective of the Excise Department is to manage the supply-chain of liquor and other intoxicants in the state, with a view to ensure that all liquor and other intoxicants manufactured or otherwise available in the state, are sourced through legal channels, and to prevent the loss of revenue due to the government on account of excise duties and fees.

This Directorate has a sanctioned strength of 312 for the officers of West Bengal Revenue Service.

== See also ==
- West Bengal Public Service Commission
- Civil Services of India
- West Bengal Civil Service
