= Karnataka Administrative Service =

Administrative civil service under the State government

- Service overview
- Abbreviation: KAS
- Date of establishment: 1951; 75 years ago
- Country: India
- Legal personality: Governmental; Civil service
- Cadre strength: 3,850
- Selection: Civil Services Examination
- Association: Karnataka State Association

Head of the State Services
- Chairman: Shivashankarappa S. Sahukar, IAS
- Administration: Government of Karnataka
- State Secretary: Dr. Rakesh Kumar K, IAS
- State Examination Controller: Nalini Atul, IAS

Karnataka Administrative Service (KAS) is the civil service of Karnataka state in India. The Public Service Commission conducts exams to recruit candidates for the service. These young officers recruited by KPSC take up various administrative posts at the district and state level. At the start they play the role of Sub Divisional Magistrate and, on promotion, Additional District Magistrates. After promotion to IAS, they take up various key positions at the district level as Deputy Commissioners and also equivalent IAS cadre jobs at the state level.

== KAS Exams Education Qualification ==
Candidate must hold a Bachelor’s degree of a University incorporated by an Act of the Central or State Legislature in India

== The total number of attempts in the KPSC KAS Exam ==
GM - 05 times

Category-1, 2A, 2B, 3A, 3B - 07 times

SC, ST - unlimited

== See also ==
- Kerala Administrative Service
