= West Bengal Civil Service =

Service of the state of West Bengal, India

West Bengal Civil Service পশ্চিমবঙ্গ নাগরিক সেবা
- Emblem of West Bengal

Service Overview
- Founded: 26 January 1950; 76 years ago
- State: West Bengal
- Country: India
- Staff college: Netaji Subhas Administrative Training Institute (NSATI), Salt Lake, Sector-III, Kolkata (Executive and Other Services); Swami Vivekanada State Police Academy (SVSPA), Barrackpore (Police and Revenue Service)
- Cadre controlling authority: Personnel & Administrative Reforms Department, Government of West Bengal
- Minister responsible: Suvendu Adhikari, Chief Minister of West Bengal and Home Minister
- Legal personality: State Civil Service
- Cadre strength: 1,677 (Gr. A, Exe.); 551 (Gr. B, WBPS); (2024)
- Selection: West Bengal Public Service Commission (WBPSC)
- Success Rate: 0.5%

Head of the Civil Services
- Chief Secretary: Manoj Kumar Agarwal, IAS
- Official website: psc.wb.gov.in

The West Bengal Civil Service (Executive) (Paśchimboṅgo Nāgarik Sēbā), commonly known as W.B.C.S. (Exe.), is the civil service of the Indian state of West Bengal. The Public Service Commission of West Bengal conducts competitive examinations for W.B.C.S. (Exe.) and other similar posts in three phases each year: Preliminary, Mains, and Personality Test.

== History ==
The West Bengal Civil Service traces its intellectual roots to the colonial administrative reforms of British India, particularly the Government of India Act of 1919 and the formation of the Bengal Public Service Commission in April 1937. After Independence, the commission was reconstituted under Articles 315–323 of the Indian Constitution, transforming WBCS into a merit-based democratic institution for state governance. Unlike the colonial ICS, which primarily served imperial interests, WBCS evolved to decentralize administration and connect governance with Bengal’s socio-economic realities at the district and grassroots levels. Today, conducted by the West Bengal Public Service Commission, WBCS remains one of eastern India’s oldest and most prestigious civil service traditions.

== Recruitment ==
There are different groups in the recruitment for this examination based on choice and merit. These are Group A, Group B (only for the West Bengal Police Service), Group C, and Group D. The WBCS (Exe) officers belong to Group A. Generally, according to the records of the WBPSC, candidates with higher scores prefer WBCS (Exe), WBPS, and some allied services like the erstwhile WBCTS as their first choice. Since 1988, some top-ranked candidates have chosen an allied service called WB Commercial Tax Service (WBCTS) as their first choice due to its less strenuous nature and the attraction of metro postings. Typically, WBCS (Exe) and WBCTS (now WBRS) cadres, along with the WBA&AS cadre, are promoted to IAS after about 27 years of service, while WBPS officers are promoted to IPS after 13 to 15 years of service in the state police.

A selection list for Group A and Group B is initially issued by the commission, consisting of the names of candidates who have cleared the cutoff scores for the respective groups and qualified for the Personality Test. A few months later, the Personality Test for Group C and Group D are conducted. Once the Personality Tests for the services under respective groups are over, the final merit list of the officers under different services are published in phases. The entire recruitment process for Group A and B officers takes approximately two and a half years, while it takes more than three years for Group C and Group D, respectively.

=== WBCS Exam ===
Exam Phase	Paper	Time	Subject	Question Type	Total Marks
Preliminary Exams	1 paper (qualifying)	2½ hrs.	General Studies (8 topics including Reasoning), English language, History, Geography, Current Affairs, General Knowledge, General Science and Indian Polity and Economy	MCQ	200
Main Exams	Paper I	3 hrs.	Bengali / Hindi / Urdu / Nepali/Santali	Descriptive	200
Main Exams	Paper II	3 hrs.	English	Descriptive	200
Main Exams	Paper III	3 hrs.	General Studies-I : History & Geography	MCQ	200
Main Exams	Paper IV	3 hrs.	General Studies-II : Science & Technology, Environment, G.K and Current Affairs	MCQ	200
Main Exams	Paper V	3 hrs.	The Constitution of India & Indian Economy	MCQ	200
Main Exams	Paper VI	3 hrs.	Arithmetic and Test of Reasoning	MCQ	200
Main Exams	Paper VII	3 hrs.	Optional Subject Paper I^{[1]}	Descriptive	200
Main Exams	Paper VIII	3 hrs.	Optional Subject Paper II	Descriptive	200
Total Marks					1600^{[2]}
^{1} Only one optional subject should be chosen from the prescribed list.; The optional paper is applicable only for candidates who have opted for Group A and B.; ^{2} The total marks are 1,200 for Group C and D candidates.

Personality Tests
Group A	Group B	Group C	Group D
200 Marks		150 Marks	100 Marks

Prior to the COVID-19 pandemic, the online application process for the examination used to begin in November, and the preliminary exam was generally held either in the last week of January or the first week of February, across various cities in West Bengal. Although the recruitment process remains the same post pandemic, the usual timings of the examination has undergone drastic changes altogether. It takes at least five months to publish the result of the Preliminary examination. The candidates clearing the cut-off score qualify for the Main examinations, conducted across four days in August–September at selected centres in Kolkata and at the WBPSC office. Candidates who pass the Mains are called for the Personality Test.

== Career Progression ==
The WBCS (Exe) officers are typically appointed as Deputy Magistrates or Deputy Collectors on probation. After completing two years of mandatory administrative training at the Administrative Training Institute, they begin their careers as Deputy Magistrates, Deputy Collectors, and Block Development Officers (BDOs). They also issue orders in Executive Magistrate Courts and enforce certain sections of the Criminal Procedure Code. These officers perform crucial administrative functions at various levels across state departments. The highest position attainable for WBCS (Exe) officers is that of Departmental Secretary, with three posts of District Magistrate reserved for them in West Bengal. Additionally, WBCS (Exe) officers may be nominated to the Indian Administrative Service (IAS) later in their careers.

Ranks, designations, and positions held by Group A Officers in their career in the WBCS
Grade/Scale (Level on Pay Matrix)	Posting at Field Offices	Posting in the Mahakaran	Equivalent Rank in Government of India	Pay Scale (Basic Pay) as per 2026 7th Pay Commission in West Bengal
Senior Administrative Grade (Pay level 14)	Divisional commissioner	Secretary	Joint Secretary to Government of India	₹144,200 (US$1,500)—₹218,200 (US$2,300)
Selection Grade (Pay level 13)	District magistrate	Joint Secretary	Director	₹123,500 (US$1,300)—₹214,100 (US$2,300)
Junior Administrative Grade (Pay level 12)	Additional District Magistrate	Director	Deputy Secretary	₹78,800 (US$840)—₹191,500 (US$2,000)
Senior Time Scale (Pay level 11)	Sub Divisional Officer	Deputy Secretary	Under Secretary	₹67,700 (US$720)—₹160,000 (US$1,700)
Junior Time Scale (Pay level 10)	Block Development Officer	Under Secretary	Assistant Secretary	₹56,100 (US$600)—₹132,000 (US$1,400)

Facilities: In addition to the Basic Pay, officers and employees are entitled to various allowances, including Dearness Allowance (DA), House Rent Allowance (HRA), Medical Allowance (MA), and Leave Travel Concession (LTC), in accordance with the provisions of the 7th Pay Commission. Officers are also eligible for leave benefits as per the Government leave policy, although only in WBCS (Exe) and WBPS, the officers even have to work even on weekends and emergency shifts in nights because of heavy work load pressure which make the work life balance little low compare to other services. Newly appointed Group A officers are provided with official residential accommodation (on availability, such as 2 BHK Bungalow/Type 2 flat for BDO, 3 BHK Bungalow/Type 3 flat for SDO, 4 BHK Bungalow/ Type 4 flat for ADM and above as per pay scale) and an official vehicle from the first day of service. Vehicles allotted for official duties may include models such as the Mahindra Bolero (for BDO), Mahindra Scorpio (for SDO), and Toyota Fortuner (for ADM & DM and above).

In 2017, the West Bengal government merged four revenue-related departments to form a single entity, the West Bengal Revenue Service (WBRS), to improve taxpayer service. The departments included in this merger were the West Bengal Commercial Tax Service, West Bengal Excise Service, West Bengal Agricultural Income Tax Service, and West Bengal Registration and Stamp Revenue Service. The Finance Department manages the cadre of the West Bengal Revenue Service. Officers start as Assistant Commissioners of Revenue and can be promoted to Deputy Commissioner, Joint Commissioner, Senior Joint Commissioner, Additional Commissioner, and Special Commissioner of Revenue. Similar to WBCS (Exe) officers, WBRS officers may also be promoted to the IAS cadre later in their careers.

WBRS officers are crucial in revenue collection, administration, and mobilisation in the state. Many aspirants prefer WBRS over WBCS (Exe) and WBPS due to its better work-life balance, urban postings, and reduced political interference, which contributes to a more comfortable work environment. WBRS officers can be posted as Assistant Commissioners in the Commercial Tax Department, Deputy Excise Collectors in the Excise Directorate, or Additional District Sub-Registrars in the Directorate of Registration and Stamp Revenue. Officers recruited at a young age may rise to the Commissioner rank, which is an IAS cadre post.

WBRS officers, as Assistant Commissioners of Revenue, handle the collection of State GST and prevent tax evasion through searches and raids. As Deputy Excise Collectors, they collect excise duty on alcoholic beverages and combat illicit drug sources through regulatory and enforcement actions. As Additional District Sub-Registrars, they oversee the registration and valuation of immovable properties during transactions and collect stamp duty and registration fees.

- WBCoS officers start as Assistant Registrars of Cooperative Societies (ARCS).
- WBLS officers begin as Assistant Labour Commissioners (ALC).
- WBF&SS officers are initially Sub-Divisional Controllers of Food and Supplies (SCFS).
- WBES officers are appointed as Employment Officers (EO).
- WBPS officers are initially posted as Deputy Superintendents of Police (DySP) or Assistant Commissioners of Police (ACP).

== Services ==
Services are categorised into four groups, as follows:

Group A

- West Bengal Civil Services (Executive) WBCS (Exe)
- West Bengal Revenue Service (WBRS) (Note: Post GST implementation, the services like Commercial Tax Service (CTS), Agricultural Income Tax Service, Excise Service and Registration and Stamp Revenue Service were merged into one service.)
- West Bengal Co-operative Service (WBCoS)
- West Bengal Labour Service (WBLS)
- West Bengal Food and Supplies Service (WBF&FS)
- West Bengal Employment Service (Non-Technical) (WBES)

Group B

- West Bengal Police Service (WBPS)

Group C

- West Bengal Correctional Home Services (CSWB)
- Joint Block Development Officer (Jt. BDO)
- Deputy Assistant Director of Consumers and Fair Business Practices
- West Bengal Junior Social Welfare Service (WBJSWS)
- Assistant Canal Revenue Officer (Irrigation) (ACRO–Irrigation)
- West Bengal Sub-ordinate Land Revenue Services, Grade-I (SLRO)
- Assistant Commercial Tax Officer (ACTO)
- Chief Controller of Correctional Service (CCCS)

Group D

- Inspector of Co-operative Societies (ICoS)
- Panchayat Development Officer (PDO)
- Rehabilitation Officer (RO)

== See also ==
- Public Service Commission, West Bengal
- West Bengal Police Service
- West Bengal State Electricity Distribution Company Limited
