= Nagaland Public Service Commission =

State government agency

- NPSC

Constitutional body overview
- Formed: 1965; 60 years ago
- Jurisdiction: Government of Nagaland
- Headquarters: Thizama, Nagaland
- Constitutional body executive: W. Honje Konyak, (Chairman) John Tsulise Sangtam (Secretary) Asangla Imti (Deputy Secretary) Kelhouseto Nakhro (Deputy Secretary) Thepfurienyü George Kire (Examination controller)
- Parent department: Personnel and Administrative Reforms Department, Nagaland
- Website: npsc.nagaland.gov.in

The Nagaland Public Service Commission (NPSC) is a constitutional body established in 1965 by the Government of Nagaland, India. It is responsible for recruiting candidates for various state government jobs through competitive examinations.

== History ==
Formation of NPSC came into consideration in 1965 when Nagaland state was born under the constitution of India. The commission was initially headed by its chairman along with its two members. In 1985, the commission was granted the permission to work under two more members.

== Functions and responsibilities ==
The commission is performing various roles as amended in Article 320 of the Constitution of India.

- To conduct competitive and civil examinations for appointments to the services under its jurisdiction.
- To conducting screening test of the selected candidates.
- To sought assistance from the Union Public Service Commission in framing, or operating schemes if needed or requested by the state commission.
- To make appointments to state civil services.
- To check the suitability of the candidates when promoting and transferring them from one service to another.

== Administrative Setup ==
NPSC was primarily headed by three members including one chairman. Since the past amendments were revised, now it consists four members and a chairman.

Name	Designation
W. Honje Konyak	Chairman
John Tsulise Sangtam	Secretary
Asangla Imti	Deputy Secretary
Kelhouseto Nakhro	Deputy Secretary
Thepfurienyü George Kire	Examination controller

== See also ==
- List of Public service commissions in India
