= WBCS =

WBCS may refer to:

- WBCS-FM, former callsign of American radio station WHQG
- West Bengal Civil Service, the civil service of the Indian state of West Bengal
