= Gujarat Administrative Service =

Administrative civil service of the Government of Gujarat

Service Overview
- Founded: 7 November 1974
- State: Gujarat
- Staff College: Sardar Patel Institute of Public Administration, Ahmedabad, Gujarat
- Cadre Controlling Authority: Personnel Division, General Administration Department, Government of Gujarat
- Minister Responsible: Bhupendra Patel, Chief Minister of Gujarat and Minister of General Administration Department
- Legal personality: Governmental: Civil service
- Current Cadre Strength: 880 members
- Selection: State Civil Services Examination
- Association: GAS Association

Head of the State Civil Services
- Chief Secretary: Raj Kumar, IAS
- Additional Chief Secretary (GAD): Kamal Dayani, IAS

Gujarat Administrative Service (IAST: Gujarāta Vahīvaṭī Sēvā), often abbreviated to as GAS, is the administrative civil service of the Government of Gujarat comprising Group A posts. It is also the feeder service for the Indian Administrative Service in the state.

GAS officers hold various posts at sub-divisional, district and state levels from conducting revenue administration and maintenance of law and order. The Personnel Division in General Administrative Department of the Government of Gujarat is the cadre-controlling authority of the service. Along with the Gujarat Police Service (GPS) and the Gujarat Forest Service (GFS), the GAS is one of the three feeder services to its respective All India Services.

== Recruitment ==
One-third of the recruitment to the service is made on the basis of an annual competitive examination conducted by the Gujarat Public Service Commission called direct GAS officers as they are directly appointed at Deputy Collector rank. Two third of the total strength is filled by promotion from Mamlatdar-Class II and Gujarat Development Service-Class II cadre who are known as promotee GAS officers. GAS officers, regardless of their mode of entry, are appointed by the Governor of Gujarat.

== Salary structure ==
At the entry level; GAS (Junior scale) which has sanctioned strength of 606 officers, 202 posts are filled through direct recruitment while 404 posts are filled through promotion of which 269 posts are reserved for Mamlatdar cadre and 135 posts are reserved for Gujarat Development Service officers. GAS (Senior Scale), GAS (Selection grade) and GAS (Apex grade) are filled by the promotion of GAS (Junior Scale) officers.

Generally those who were directly recruited by GPSC as GAS (Junior scale) officers get promoted into the IAS after reaching up-to the level of Additional Collector. Unlike other states civil services in India, GAS officers are rarely posted in the State Secretariat until promoted to IAS officers.

The salary structure of the Gujarat Administrative Service
Grade/level on pay matrix	Base Salary (per month)	Sanctioned Strength	Some Positions in the Government of Gujarat Government	Years of service
GAS Apex grade (pay level 13A)	₹131100–216600	15	Resident Additional Collector (Additional District Magistrate), Additional Collector, Director of District Rural Development Agency, Deputy Municipal Commissioner, Regional Transport Commissioner	15th year
GAS Selection grade (pay level 13)	₹123100–215900	69	Resident Additional Collector (Additional District Magistrate), Additional Collector, Director of District Rural Development Agency, Deputy Municipal Commissioner, Regional Transport Commissioner	10th year
GAS Senior scale (pay level 12)	₹78800–209200	190	Resident Additional Collector (Additional District Magistrate), Additional Collector, Director of District Rural Development Agency, Deputy Municipal Commissioner, Regional Transport Commissioner	5th year
GAS Junior scale (pay level 10)	₹56100–177500	606	Prant Officer (Sub Divisional Magistrate), District Supply Officer, Deputy Collector, Deputy District Development Officer, Deputy District Election Officer, Special Land Acquisition Officer	Initial year

== Major concerns and reforms ==
=== Promotee-direct GAS quota change ===
Gujarat Government amended GAS Rules, 1974 changed ratio of 3:1 to 2:1 between promoted and direct GAS officers on 1 March 2014. Earlier 75% of GAS (Junior scale) posts were reserved for Class II Mamlatdars and Gujarat Development Service Class II officers while 25% were directly recruited. This resulted in career stagnation and slower promotion avenues for promoted officers. Direct GAS officers too didn't like the move as larger intake results in slower promotion into IAS. However GAS aspirants welcomed the move because it increased the vacancies.

=== Postings in State Secretariat ===
Currently only two posts of Deputy Secretary in Revenue Department are reserved for GAS officers after 2019 cadre review. Gujarat Secretariat Service (GSS) officers have opposed postings of GAS officers into State Secretariat. GAS officers have demanded for earmarking posts of Additional Secretaries and Joint Secretaries in all departments of State Secretariat to ensure proper field-secretariat relationship and synergy between policy formulation and policy implementation of various government policies. Since almost all state civil/administrative services have such nature of postings in India.

=== Revival of divisions ===
The office of divisional commissioners was abolished in 1950 when Gujarat was part of Bombay State. It was revived back in 1958 under Commissioner of Divisions Act, 1958. When Gujarat was separated from Bombay State in 1960, many senior IAS officers opted newly formed Maharashtra over Gujarat. Hence Gujarat Government had to abolish the posts once again due to shortage of senior IAS officers. GAS officers worked in divisions at various capacities such as Deputy Commissioner (Revenue), Deputy Commissioner (Panchayats) and Deputy Commissioner (Municipalities).

=== Pay parity ===
GAS Association has demanded on many occasions to have complete implementation of seventh pay commission report and pay parity on par with other state civil services in India such as Provincial Civil Service (Uttar Pradesh), Rajasthan Administrative Service. Introduction of Pay Level 11 and Pay Level 14 has been the demand of GAS officers.
