= Chhattisgarh Public Service Commission =

State government agency in India

- छत्तीसगढ़ लोक सेवा आयोग; CGPSC

Constitutional body overview
- Formed: 23 May 2001; 24 years ago
- Jurisdiction: Government of Chhattisgarh
- Headquarters: North Block, Sector-19, Nava Raipur Atal Nagar, Chhattisgarh
- Constitutional body executive: Rita Shandilya, (Chairman) Shri Pushpendra Kumar Meena (I.A.S.) (Secretary) Dr. Sarita Uike (Member) Er. Santkumar Netam (Member)
- Website: psc.cg.gov.in

The Chhattisgarh Public Service Commission (CGPSC) is a government agency of the state of Chhattisgarh, India, responsible for recruiting candidates for various state government jobs through competitive examinations.

== History ==
The commission came into existence under the provision of Act 315 of Part XIV of the Constitution of India on 23 May 2001, when the state of Chhattisgarh was formed on 1 November 2000 by partitioning the several districts of Madhya Pradesh, into one state.

== Functions ==
CGPSC performs its functions as authorized by Act 315 under the supervision of Government of Chhattisgarh and state governor.

- Conducting recruitment process of the selected candidates.
- Conducting interviews and screening tests of eligible candidates.
- Conducting competitive and departmental examinations.
- To maintain and decide service rules.
- Advice to the Chhattisgarh Government.

== Commission profile ==
CGPSC members are appointed or removed by the state governor. Their term of service is set to six years which starts from the date of appointment.

Name	Position
Rita Shandilya	Chairman
Shri Pushpendra Kumar Meena (I.A.S.)	Secretary
Dr. Sarita Uike	Member
Er. Santkumar Netam	Member

== See also ==
- List of Public service commissions in India
