= Haryana Public Service Commission =

State government agency

- हरियाणा लोक सेवा आयोग; HPSC

Constitutional body overview
- Formed: 1 November 1966; 59 years ago
- Jurisdiction: Government of Haryana
- Headquarters: Bays 1-10, Block – B, Sector 4, Panchkula, Haryana
- Constitutional body executive: Alok Verma IFS, (Chairman) Smt.Jyoti Bainda(Member) Dr.Pawan Kumar (Member) Sh.Anand Kumar Sharma (Member) Sh.Rajinder Kumar (Member)
- Website: hpsc.gov.in

The Haryana Public Service Commission (HPSC) is a government agency of the state of Haryana, India, established by the Constitution of India, responsible for the recruitment of candidates for various government jobs under the Government of Haryana through competitive examinations.

== History ==
The foundation of HPSC was laid on 1 November 1966 when Haryana state was formed after the independence movement of India. It was originally established under the provisions of Punjab Reorganisation Act, 1966. Government of India Act 1935 authorized the state government to form a state public service commission.

== Functions ==
HPSC performs its functions as authorized by Act-1966 and 1935 provisions constitution of India. Its chairman is authorized to make independent decisions under the certain rules and regulations amended by the Government of Haryana and its state governor.

- Conducting written examinations and recruitment process of the eligible candidates.
- Conducting interviews and screening tests of eligible candidates.
- Conducting competitive and departmental examinations.
- To maintain and decide service rules.
- Advice to the Haryana Government.

== Commission profile ==
HPSC consists of 5 members and 1 chairman that are appointed or removed by the state governor. Their term of service is set to fixed period which starts from the date of appointment.

Name	Designation
Alok Verma IFS	Chairman
Surender Singh	Member
Pawan Kumar	Member
Anand Kumar Sharma	Member
Rajender kumar	Member
Jyoti Bainda	Member

== See also ==
- Administrative divisions of Haryana
- List of Public service commissions in India
