= Executive magistrate =

Executive magistrate may refer to:

- Executive magistrates of the Roman Republic
- Executive magistrate (India)
- Executive magistrate (Bangladesh)
