= Sikkim Public Service Commission =

Government agency in Sikkim, India

- SPSC

Constitutional body overview
- Formed: 1975; 51 years ago
- Jurisdiction: Government of Sikkim
- Headquarters: Old Tourism Complex, M. G. Marg, Gangtok, Sikkim
- Constitutional body executive: C.P Tongden, (Chairman) Deepa Rani Thapa (Secretary) T. T Sherpa (Member)
- Website: spscskm.gov.in

The Sikkim Public Service Commission (SPSC) have been set up in terms of Article 315 of the Constitution of India. The Public Service Commission are envisaged as independent constitutional institutions not subject to governmental or political interference or control and charged with the responsibility of recruitment and management of public services. Under Article 320 of the Constitution of India, it conducts examinations for appointment of persons to the Services etc.

== History ==
SPSC came into consideration back in May 1975. When Sikkim state was integrated with the Constitutional Provision under Article 315, the commission was constituted in 1978. During the initial periods, it did not work for four years, becoming functioning only in 1982 when the state governor appointed the Commissions' Chairman.

== Functions and responsibilities ==
The functions of the State Public Service Commission, as enumerated in Clause (1) of Article 320 of the Constitution of India, are

(1) to conduct examinations for appointments to the services of the State;

(2) to make recommendations to the State Government for appointment of persons to the Services;

(3) to be consulted in the matters of appointment, promotions, transfer and disciplinary matters of civilian employees of the State Government;

(4) to advise on any other matter that may be referred by the Government;

(5) to advise on any claim by or in respect of a person who is serving or has served under the Government of the State in a civil capacity, that any costs incurred by him in defending legal proceedings instituted against him in respect of acts done or purporting to be done in the execution of his duty should be paid out of the Consolidated Fund of the State;

(6) to advise on claim for the award of a person in respect of injuries sustained by a person while in service under the Government of Sikkim, in a civil capacity, and any question as to the amount of any such award;

(7) to present on annual report to the Governor who shall cause it to be laid before the State Legislature.

It is also the duty of Commission to tender advice on any matter so referred to it and on any other matter which the Governor of the State may refer to it.

== Commission profile ==
The commission is headed by a Chairman and members for specific roles. Their term of service and suspension are governed by the Sikkim Public Service Commission (Members) Regulations Act, 1983.

== See also ==
- List of Public service commissions in India
