= Deputy collector =

State civil service in India

A Deputy Collector is an administrative officer in an Indian district who exercises land revenue, executive, and magisterial functions. They are part of the land revenue department of the state government; assist the District Collector/ District Magistrate in various roles. Deputy Collectors are responsible for land revenue collection, revenue recovery, land acquisition, election-related work, disaster management, land reforms, land surveys, and other tasks assigned within the district administration. They function under the overall supervision of the Collector and District Magistrate of the district.

The post is held by officers of the state civil services/state administrative services.

== Functions ==
Deputy Collectors are senior officers of the State Revenue Department. They are assigned specific responsibilities within a district, including disaster management, elections, land reforms, revenue recovery, land acquisition, and related administrative functions. Deputy Collectors may also be posted as Sub-Divisional Officers and Sub-Divisional Magistrates (SDMs), heading a revenue subdivision and exercising the magisterial powers vested in the post.

== Posting ==
Deputy Collectors are appointed either through direct recruitment conducted by the respective State Public Service Commissions or by promotion from lower revenue cadres such as Tehsildars.

Deputy Collectors constitute a feeder cadre for promotion to the Indian Administrative Service (IAS), subject to eligibility and vacancies in the state civil service (SCS) quota.

Their career begins with a period of probation, after which they are appointed as Deputy Collectors in a district. They may subsequently serve as Sub-Divisional Officers cum Sub-Divisional Magistrates (SDM), and later rise to positions such as Additional Collector or District Revenue Officer, and Additional District Magistrate (ADM).

== See also ==
- District Collector
- Tehsildar
