= Tehsildar =

Tax officer in some South Asian countries

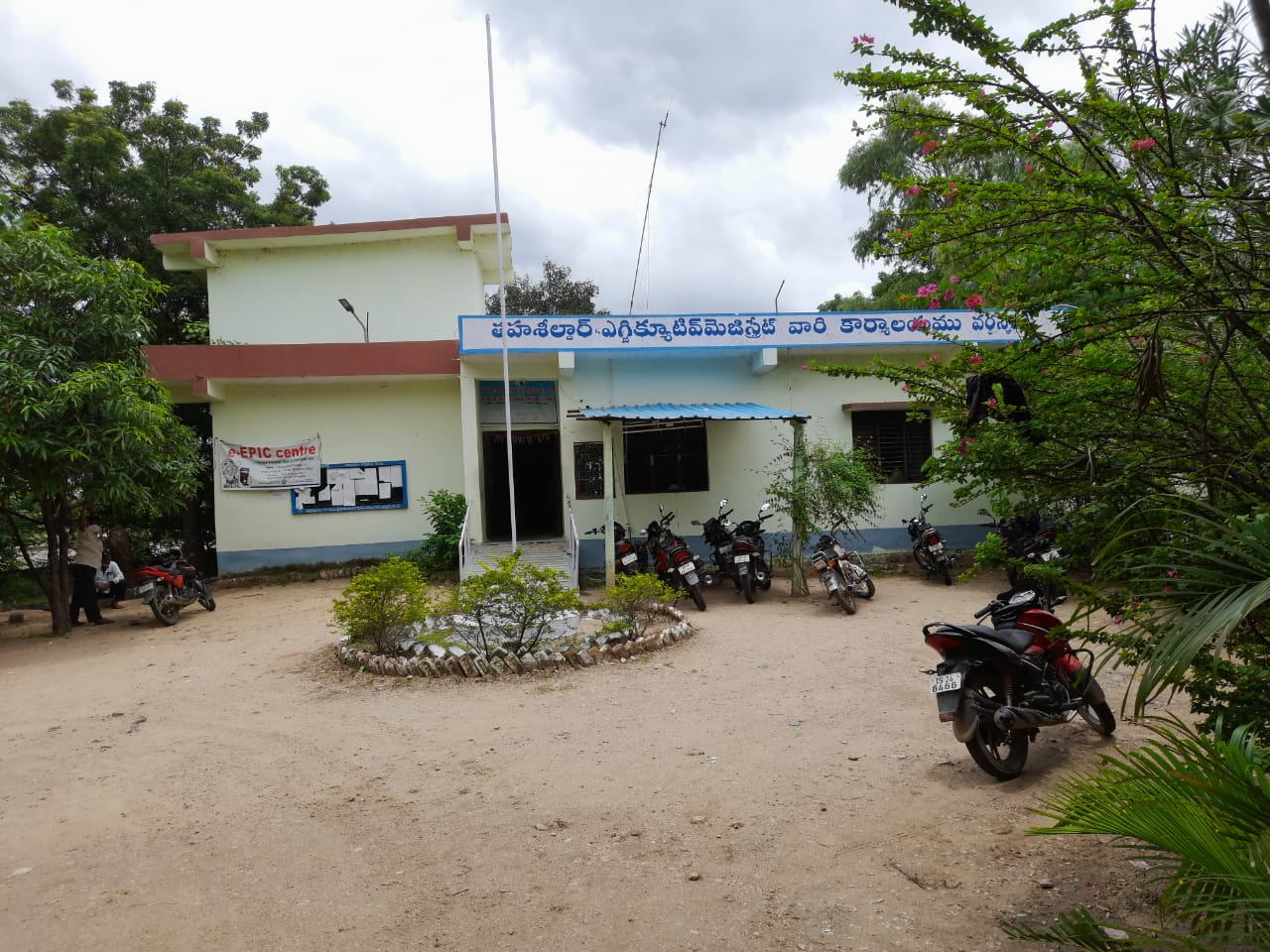
Tehsildar office in Wardhannapet Telangana

In Bangladesh, India, and Pakistan, a tehsildar, talukdar, or mamlatdar is a land revenue officer accompanied by revenue inspectors. They are in charge of obtaining taxes from a tehsil with regard to land revenue. A tehsildar may also be appointed or empowered to exercise the functions of an executive magistrate under applicable laws. The immediate subordinate of a tehsildar is known as a naib tehsildar.

== Etymology ==
The term is assumed to be of Mughal origin and is perhaps a union of the words "tehsil" and "dar". "Tehsil" is an Arabic word meaning "revenue collection", and "dar" is a Persian word meaning "holder of a position". Mamlatdar is a synonymous term used in some Indian states that comes from the Hindi word māmala (मामला), which is derived from the Arabic muʿāmala (مُعَامَلَة – "conduct, dealing, handling").

== India ==
=== British rule ===
During British rule, a tehsildar was most likely a stipendiary officer of the government, employed to raise revenue. The position was called mamlatdar in Goa and some parts of Maharashtra. It was subsequently used by Pakistan and India following their independence from the British Empire. Tehsildar is also known as Talukdar in some states of India. In Assam, Bengal, and parts of Jharkhand, a tehsildar is known as a Mouzadar.

=== Independence ===
Tehsildar are Class 1 gazetted officers in most states of India. In Uttar Pradesh, tehsildar are given powers of assistant collector Grade I. They also are given judicial power. They implement the various policies of the taluka and are subject to the district collector. Officers holding the post of tehsildar preside over matters related to land, tax, and revenue. Tehsildar were first appointed as Naib Tehsildars after successful completion of a State Service Exam (i.e. UP-PSC in Uttar Pradesh, HP-PSC in Himachal Pradesh, RPSC in Rajasthan, MP-PSC in Madhya Pradesh, BPSC in Bihar, AP-PSC in Andhra Pradesh, TSPSC in Telangana, or other equivalent exams in other states of India), or promoted from a subordinate post like Kanoongo (also known as Revenue Inspectors). In Uttar Pradesh, tehsildar are promoted from Naib Tehsildar. Later on, they get promoted to the post of sub-divisional magistrate.

In Goa, the mamlatdar heads the taluka revenue office. While each taluka has a mamlatdar, there are also several joint mamlatdars and the work is distributed among them.

Each state is divided into districts. The district's senior civil servant is the district collector/district magistrate, who is an officer from the IAS cadre. These districts are further subdivided into revenue subdivisions or prants (West India). Each subdivision is under the charge of an officer designated as a sub-divisional magistrate (SDM), or deputy collector, who is a member of the State Civil Service cadre. In the revenue department, the deputy collector reports to the district revenue officer (DRO), who is also called the additional district magistrate (ADM Revenue) and is the person in charge of the revenue department for the district. The DRO in turn reports to the district collector (also called district magistrate, or DM), who is in charge of overall management of the district across all departments. Deputy collectors are hired through State Service Selection Commissions, whereas DROs and district collectors are usually Centre Civil Services employees appointed to the state cadre.
