= Tripura Public Service Commission =

State government agency

- TPSC

Government body overview
- Formed: 30 October 1972; 53 years ago
- Jurisdiction: Government of Tripura
- Headquarters: Agartala, Tripura
- Government body executive: Dilip Kumar Chakma, IAS (Retd.), (Chairman) Dr. Manidipa Debbarma (Member) T.K. Debnath (Secretary) D. Dam (Joint Secretary) A. Pal (Controller of Examinations) K. Jamatia (Deputy Secretary) J. Debbarma (Under Secretary) A. Bhattacharjee (Under Secretary)
- Website: tpsc.nic.in

The Tripura Public Service Commission (TPSC) is a government agency of the state of Tripura, India, established as per Article 315 of the Constitution of India, for conducting recruitment of candidates for various state government jobs through competitive examinations.

== History ==
TPSC came into existence eight months after the 21 January 1972 formation of Tripura state. After being served without its constitutional body for eight months, the commission came into existence on 30 October, 1972 under Article 315, a provision of Constitution of India.

== Functions ==
State public service commission including TPSC are outlined by the Article 315. They perform several functions related to recruitment process to various posts in its jurisdiction. It was mainly established to conduct competitive examinations.

- To conduct civil and departmental examinations for appointment to various services at the State level.
- To recruit the eligible candidates to the Ministerial Services.
- To advice state government for making appointments and promotions.
- To advice government on transfers of the in-service candidates from one service to another service.

== Commission profile ==
TPSC members are appointed or removed by the state governor. Their terms of services such as promoting or transferring from one service to another is governed by the state governor, if available.

Name	Designation
Dilip Kumar Chakma, IAS (Retd.)	Chairman
Dr. Manidipa Debbarma, Principal (Retd.)	Member
T.K. Debnath	Secretary
D. Dam	Joint Secretary
A. Pal	Controller of Examinations
G. Jamatia	Deputy Secretary
K. Debbarma	Under Secretary
A. Bhattacharjee	Under Secretary

== See also ==
- List of Public service commissions in India
