= West Bengal Legal Service =

West Bengal Legal Service (W.B.L.S.) is the legal service of the Indian state of West Bengal. It performs examinations of people with LL.B. degrees from recognized universities for positions to handle litigation and court cases for the Government of West Bengal.

== History ==
The service was created in 1996–97 by the Law Department, Government of West Bengal find quality legislative drafters to handle the public litigation and court cases for the government. On 16 March 2006, vide memo. no 310-L, West Bengal Legal Service Rule was published by order of the Governor.

== Recruitment ==
The recruitment to this Service is made on the basis of Competitive Examination conducted by Public Service Commission, West Bengal. The persons having LL.B. degree from a recognized university are eligible to appear for the examination of West Bengal Legal Service. The officers are included in the state cadre of Group-A service officers.

== Work and postings ==
The Legal Service Officers are usually appointed and start their career as "Law Officer". The officers of this service perform the main legal functions and take care of court and tribunal matters, including cases of the Supreme Court of India on behalf of the government. Legal Service officers work at different levels of various departments, directorates, boards, commissions, universities and districts of West Bengal. The state also depute some officers to the Government of India and related wings of central government as needed.

The Law officers of West Bengal may also be promoted at a later stage on a seniority basis, such as to Senior Law Officer (Ex-Officio Assistant Secretary), Special Law Officer (Ex-Officio Deputy Secretary) and Sr. Special Law Officer (Ex-Officio Joint Secretary).
