= Department of Personnel and Administrative Reforms (Kerala) =

Indian state government department

Personnel and Administrative Reforms Department
- Emblem of the Government of Kerala

Department overview
- Jurisdiction: Government of Kerala
- Headquarters: Government Secretariat, Thiruvananthapuram
- Minister responsible: V.D. Satheesan, Chief minister and Minister for Personnel and Administrative Reforms
- Department executive: Dr. Asha Thomas IAS, Additional Chief Secretary to Govt (Personnel and Administrative Reforms)
- Parent Department: Government of Kerala
- Child agencies: Institute of Management in Government; Kerala Administrative Tribunal
- Website: pard.kerala.gov.in

The Department of Personnel and Administrative Reforms (P&ARD) is an administrative department of the Government of Kerala. It is responsible for personnel management, cadre control, administrative reforms, and implementation of the state’s official language policy. The department is the cadre controlling authority of the Kerala Administrative Service (KAS).

== Functions ==
The main objective of the department is personnel management and administrative reforms in the Government of Kerala, with a focus on recruitment, training, human resource development, and ensuring uniform standards in public administration.

Personnel and Service matters

- Kerala Public Service Act
- Formulation and implementation of general policies relating to public services in the State, including recruitment, reservation in appointments, service integration, recognition of service associations, recognition of qualifications, departmental tests, and other service related matters.
- Kerala State Subordinate Service Rules and the Special Rules
- Issuing general instructions for the preparation of confidential reports and property statements of the government employees.
- Advice on service matters.

Administrative reforms

- Administrative reforms and administrative research
- Job evaluation
- Delegation of powers
- Inspection of secreteriat departments
- Kerala Administrative Tribunal
- Career management
- Simplification and mechanisation in administration

Training

- Training and capacity building of government employees, including deputation for training in India and abroad.
- Administration of foreign assignments and volunteer programmes.
- Oversight of the Institute of Management in Government (IMG).

Official languages

- Promotion of Malayalam as the official language in government business.
- Script reform in Malayalam

== Organisation ==
=== Leadership ===
The Chief Minister of Kerala, V.D. Satheesan is the minister in charge of the Department of Personnel and Administrative Reforms since May 2026.

Administratively, the department is headed by an Additional Chief Secretary to Government, an IAS Officer.

The department functions through its four divisions;

- Administrative Reforms Division
- Administrative Vigilance Cell
- Rules Division
- Advice Division

== Sub-divisions ==
The following institution functions under the administrative control of the department:

- Institute of Management in Government
- Administrative Reforms Commission of Kerala
- Kerala Administrative Tribunal

== See also ==
- Department of General Administration (Kerala)
- Ministry of Personnel, Public Grievances and Pensions
- Kerala Administrative Service
- Government of Kerala
