= Meghalaya Public Service Commission =

State government agency

- MPSC

Commission overview
- Formed: 14 September 1972; 53 years ago
- Preceding agencies: State Public Service Commission; Public Service Commission
- Jurisdiction: Government of Meghalaya
- Headquarters: Shillong, Meghalaya
- Commission executive: Babynna T. Sangma, (Chairman) Bedarius Shylla (Member)
- Website: mpsc.nic.in

The Meghalaya Public Service Commission (MPSC) is a government body of the state of Meghalaya, India, established as per the Article 315 of the Constitution of India. It is responsible for recruitment of candidates for various government jobs under the Government of Meghalaya through competitive examinations.

== History ==
The formation of MPSC came into consideration in 1972 when Meghalaya state was born under the Constitution of India.

== Functions ==
The scope and functions of the State public service commissions including MPSC are outlined by the Article 320 of the Constitution of India. They perform several functions related to recruitment process to various posts their respective state's jurisdiction. It was mainly established to conduct competitive examinations.

- Advising the Government on all matters relating to methods of Recruitment to various services and posts.
- To conduct civil and departmental examinations for appointment to various services at the State level.
- Disciplinary cases relating to different civil services

== Commission profile ==
The commission is headed by a Chairman and members for specific roles. MPSC members are appointed or removed by the state governor.

Name	Designation
Babynna T. Sangma	Chairman
Bedarius Shylla	Member
Ashish Mankin Sangma	Secretary
Monica Shira Kshir	Chief Controller of Examination
