= Odisha Public Service Commission =

State government agency

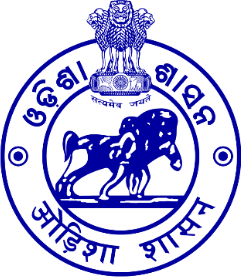
- Abbreviation: OPSC
- Formation: 1 April 1949; 77 years ago
- Type: Government body
- Location: 19, Dr. P.K. Parija Road, Cuttack, Odisha, PIN: 753001
- Region served: India
- Website: opsc.gov.in

The Odisha Public Service Commission (OPSC) is a government agency of the state of Odisha, India, responsible for the recruitment of candidates for various state government jobs through competitive examinations. It advises the Government of Odisha on all matters relating to the rules of recruitment, appointment, transfer, promotion, professional standards and disciplinary action. In this capacity, the commission organizes recruitment procedures, competitive examinations and screening tests, and candidate interview boards for the appointment of candidates within the state.

== History ==
The recommendations of the Royal Commission on superior services in India, 1949 are referred to in short as the Lee Commission. They were added to the Constitution of India as Articles 315 to 323. OPSC was constituted on 1 April 1949 after its bifurcation from the former Bihar and Odisha Joint Public Service Commission. At the time of creation, the Odisha Public Service Commission had three members, including a chairman. The membership increased to five in 1979 and further increased to six in 1996.

== Functions ==
The functions of the Commission are divided into the following four categories:

- Advice on the framing of recruitment rules and amendments with regard to the recruitment and conditions of service of Group 'B' posts/services carrying scale of pay of Rs. 6500-200-10,500/- and above and Group 'A' posts/services.
- Advice on punishment proposed by the disciplinary authority in finalization of departmental proceedings under the Odisha Civil Services (Classification, Control & Appeal) Rules, 1962 read with Rule 7 of the Odisha Civil Services (Pension) Rules, 1992.
- Advice on matters relating to promotion of officers and fixation of inter-seniority, etc., with regard to officers of Group 'B' carrying a pay scale of Rs. 6500-200-10,500/- and above and all Group 'A' officers.
- Recruitment of candidates to posts/services belonging to Group 'B' and above under the State Government.
  - Through competitive examination and viva vice test as prescribed in the recruitment rules; and
  - Through viva vice test only.

== Examinations ==
List of examinations conducted by the Odisha Public Service Commission:

- Odisha Civil Service Examination
- Odisha Judicial Service Examination
- Odisha Education Services
- Odisha Statistics & Economics Service
- Odisha Municipality Administration Service
- Junior Lecturers in O.E.S.
- Asst. Section Officer
- Assistant Conservator of Forests and Forest Ranger
- Asst. Executive Engineer (Civil & Mechanical)
- Asst. Executive Engineer (Electrical)
- Junior Assistant in the Office of OPSC
- Assistant Soil Conservation Officer
- Assistant Agriculture Officer
- Assistant Agriculture Engineer
- Assistant Horticulture Officer
- Assistant Fisheries Officer
- Odisha Technical Education and training service.
- Medical Officers .
- Ayurvedic medical officers.
- Homeopathy Medical Officers.
- Odisha Mining and Geology service .
- Drug Inspector
- Assistant Industries Officer
- IAS

== Delays in announcing examination results ==
OPSC was criticized for not conducting examinations on time due to various cases pending with State Administrative Tribunal (SAT) and Odisha High Court. The final result of Odisha Civil Service, 2011 was declared only in February, 2016. It has been more than four years since the advertisement and nine months since the examination for Assistant Section Officer, but OPSC has been unable to decide the date of the result announcement. Questions were raised by the candidates who contested for the post. They claim that if OPSC was not so hurried in the recruitment process, they could have advertised the vacancy in 2017 or later.

== See also ==
- List of Public service commissions in India
