= Arunachal Pradesh Public Service Commission =

State government agency

- Abbreviation: APPSC
- Formation: 1 April 1988
- Type: Government body
- Purpose: Recruitment
- Location: PSC Building, Vidhan Vihar, Itanagar, Arunachal Pradesh- 791111
- Region served: Arunachal Pradesh
- Members: 3 Members
- Official language: English.
- Chairman: Prof. Pradip Lingfa
- Website: Official Web site

The Arunachal Pradesh Public Service Commission (APPSC) is a government agency in the state of Arunachal Pradesh, India, responsible for recruiting candidates through competitive examinations for various departments and Services under the Government of Arunachal Pradesh and to advise the government on recruitment matters.

== See also ==
- List of Public service commissions in India
