= Himachal Pradesh Public Service Commission =

Indian state government agency

- हिमाचल प्रदेश लोक सेवा आयोग; HPPSC

Constitutional body overview
- Formed: 8 April 1971; 55 years ago
- Jurisdiction: Government of Himachal Pradesh
- Headquarters: Circular Road, Nigam Vihar, Chotta Shimla, Shimla, Himachal Pradesh
- Constitutional body executive: Capt. Rameshwar Singh Thakur, IPS (Retd.), (Chairman) Devinder Kumar Rattan, IAS (Secretary)
- Website: hppsc.hp.gov.in

The Himachal Pradesh Public Service Commission (HPPSC) is a government agency of the state of Himachal Pradesh, India, established on 8 April 1971 under the provisions of the Constitution of India. It is responsible for the recruitment of candidates for various government jobs under the Government of Himachal Pradesh through competitive examinations.

== History ==
The foundation of HPPSC is rooted in a November 1 , 1966 request by the state governor to the President of India to establish a recruiting body for the Himachal Pradesh state. It was originally established under the provisions of Act, 318 of Constitution of India which authorized the state government to form state public service commission.

== Functions and responsibilities ==
As amended in Article 320 of the Constitution of India, the State Public Service Commission is authorised to perform the following functions:

- To conduct examinations for appointments to the services in its respective state.
- If Union Public Service Commission requested by two or more state commissions in assisting framing, or operating schemes of joint recruitment for any service for which candidates possessing special qualifications are required.
- To make appointments to state civil services.
- To promote and transfer from one service to another and to check the suitability of candidates for such decisions.
- Its main function is taking recruitments in Class-I and Class-II officers.

== Commission profile ==
HPPSC consists of various members and a chairman that are appointed or removed by the state governor. Their term of service is set to fixed period which starts from the date of appointment.

Name	Designation
Capt. Rameshwar Singh Thakur, IPS(Retd.)	Chairman
Col.Rajesh Kumar Sharma(Retd.)	Member
Dr. Pavnesh Kumar, IFS(Retd.)	Member
Rakhil Kahlaon,IAS(Retd.)	Member
Prof. Mamta Mokta	Member

== See also ==
- List of Public service commissions in India
