= Constitutional body (Germany) =

Under German constitutional law, a constitutional body (German: Verfassungsorgan) is an institution that participates in the formation of the state’s collective will and that is explicitly granted rights and duties under the Constitution. Within Germany’s federal system, a fundamental distinction must be made between the constitutional bodies on the federal level and those in the 16 states.

== Constitutional bodies at the federal level ==
At the federal level, according to the prevailing view, there are seven constitutional bodies, five of which are considered permanent and two non-permanent. While the former carry out ongoing tasks in day-to-day political life, the latter have special functions for which they convene solely on an ad hoc basis or under extraordinary circumstances.

Permanent constitutional bodies:

- President of Germany; head of state
- Bundestag; part of the legislative branch
- Bundesrat; part of the legislative branch
- Federal Government; executive branch
- Federal Constitutional Court; judiciary

Non-permanent constitutional bodies:

- Federal Convention; electoral assembly convened solely for the purpose of electing the President of Germany
- Joint Committee; emergency parliament that can replace the Bundestag and the Bundesrat in the event of a national defense emergency, but only, if the Bundestag is no longer able to act

However, there are differing opinions regarding this list and classification. For example, some argue that the Chancellor is also a constitutional body in his own right (and not merely part of the Federal Government), since the Constitution grants him specific powers. The prevailing view, however, sees these powers merely as a concrete expression of the Chancellor’s prominent leadership role within the government. Some also assume that the Federal Court of Audit is a separate constitutional body; however, this is contradicted by its complete lack of direct influence on legislation and government policy. Finally, the classification of the Joint Committee as a non-permanent body is also controversial, since it (unlike the Federal Convention) always exists and is merely prevented from holding regular sessions in times of peace.

== Constitutional bodies at the state level ==
Although the 16 German states have, in principle, a fairly high degree of autonomy in shaping their governmental structures, in practice they have adopted constitutional systems that are quite similar, and in which three (permanent) constitutional bodies can be distinguished:

- State parliaments
- State governments
- State constitutional courts
