= Public service commissions in India =

Recruitment agencies to public service in India

In India, public service commissions are constitutional bodies established under Article 315 (Part XIV) of the Constitution of India. Its provisions are explained till Article 323. The Government of India and individual state governments have their public service commissions.

The central government's Union Public Service Commission (UPSC) conducts examinations for recruitment to the All India Services (AIS) and the Central Civil Services (CCS) and to advise the President on disciplinary matters. State Public Service Commission in every state conducts examinations for recruitment to state services and advises the governor on disciplinary matters.

== Central Public Services Commission ==
Public Service Commissions in India	Headquarters
Central Public Service Commission
Union Public Service Commission	New Delhi

== State Public Service Commissions ==
Public Service Commissions in India	Headquarters
State Public Service Commission
Andhra Pradesh Public Service Commission	Vijayawada
Arunachal Pradesh Public Service Commission	Itanagar
Assam Public Service Commission	Guwahati
Bihar Public Service Commission	Patna
Chhattisgarh Public Service Commission	Raipur
Goa Public Service Commission	Panaji
Gujarat Public Service Commission	Gandhinagar
Haryana Public Service Commission	Panchkula
Himachal Pradesh Public Service Commission	Shimla
Jammu and Kashmir Public Service Commission	Srinagar & Jammu
Jharkhand Public Service Commission	Ranchi
Karnataka Public Service Commission	Bangalore
Kerala Public Service Commission	Thiruvananthapuram
Madhya Pradesh Public Service Commission	Indore
Maharashtra Public Service Commission	Mumbai
Manipur Public Service Commission	Imphal
Meghalaya Public Service Commission	Shillong
Mizoram Public Service Commission	Aizawl
Nagaland Public Service Commission	Kohima
Odisha Public Service Commission	Cuttack
Punjab Public Service Commission	Patiala
Rajasthan Public Service Commission	Ajmer
Sikkim Public Service Commission	Gangtok
Tamil Nadu Public Service Commission	Chennai
Telangana State Public Service Commission	Hyderabad
Tripura Public Service Commission	Agartala
Uttar Pradesh Public Service Commission	Prayagraj
Uttarakhand Public Service Commission	Haridwar
West Bengal Public Service Commission	Kolkata

== See also ==
- Civil Services of India
- Imperial Civil Service
