= Gujarat Public Service Commission =

State government agency

- ગુજરાત જાહેર સેવા આયોગ
- Abbreviation: GPSC
- Formation: 1 May 1960; 65 years ago
- Type: Government agency
- Purpose: Recruitment
- Headquarters: Gandhinagar, Gujarat
- Region served: Gujarat
- Chairman: Shri Hasmukh Patel, IPS
- Website: gpsc.gujarat.gov.in

The Gujarat Public Service Commission (GPSC) is a government body of the state of Gujarat, India, created by the Constitution of India, responsible for recruiting candidates for various government jobs under the Government of Gujarat through competitive examinations.

== Commission profile ==
The commission functions through its Chairman and members, and supervised by the state governor.

Designation	Current office holder
Chairman	Shri Hasmukh Patel, IPS (Retd.)
Member	Smt. Asha R. Shah, IAS (Retd.)
Member	Shri Ashokkumar M. Bhavsar, Additional Secretary (Retd.)
Member	Shri Sureshchandra K. Patel, Chief Engineer (Retd.)
Member	Vacant
Member	Vacant

Designation	Current office holder	Email ID	Phone Number
Secretary	Ms Vina I Patel ( In Charge )		(079) 23258959
Joint Secretary (R-5, R-6, R-7, P)	Shri S.S. Patwardhan		(079) 23258965
Joint Secretary (ACCOUNT, EDPCELL, EX-1, R-2, R&D & RR)	Shri H. K. Thakar		(079) 23258964
Joint Secretary (R1, R3, EDPCELL, Additional Charge CNF)	Shri D.M. Chauhan		(079) 23258206
Joint Secretary (EST, EXM, RECORD, REGISTRY, LEGAL, EX-2, DEQ, RTI)	Shri S.M. Daudkarim		(079) 23258961
Joint Secretary (CNF)	Shri L. B. Suthar		(079) 23258966
Incharge Joint Secretary (R-1, R-3, R-4)	Shri R.C. Maheshwari		(079) 23258970
Joint Secretary	(Vacant)	-	(079) --
Account Officer (ACCOUNTS, REGISTRY)	Shri M. R. Mistry		(079) 23258977
Deputy Secretary (R1, R4)	Shri R.C.Maheshwari		(079) 23258970
Deputy Secretary (CNF)	Shri D. T. Ninama		(079) 23258950
Deputy Secretary (EST, EXM, LEGAL, R-6 & R-7)	Shri Gaurav R. Pandya		(079) 23258973
Deputy Secretary (R-5 & DEQ)	Ms. Nasim M. Modan		(079) 23258962
Deputy Secretary (EX-2, R&D, RR & SYLLABUS)	Shri D. B. Jhala		(079) 23258975
Deputy Secretary	()	-	(079) 23258994
Deputy Secretary	()	-	(079) 23258986
Deputy Secretary	()	-	(079) 23258971
P. S. to Chairman I/C	Shri K. R. Patel	-	(079) 23258951
P. S. to Secretary I/C	Shri H. J. Rathod		(079) 23258959

== Functions of the Commission ==
The following functions have been entrusted to the Gujarat Public Service Commission under Article 320 of the Constitution of India.

- To conduct examinations for appointments to the services of the State.
- To advise on –
  - The matters relating to methods of recruitment to various Services of the State;
  - The principles to be followed in making appointments to services of the State and granting promotions, transfers from one service to another and the suitability of candidates for such appointments, promotions and transfers;
  - All the disciplinary matters affecting the Government servants,
  - The claims of reimbursements of legal expenses incurred by Government Servants in defending themselves in legal proceedings initiated against them for the act done or purported to be done by them while executing their duty;
  - The claims for granting injury-pensions to Government Servants; and
  - Any other matters that may be referred to the commission by His Excellency the Governor

These functions are subject to the limitations imposed by the Gujarat Public Service Commission (Exemption from Consultation) Regulations, 1960 made under proviso to clause (3) of Article 320 of the Constitution of India.

== List of Chairman of GPSC ==
Name	From	To	Remark
Shri Hasmukh Patel	11 November 2024	Incumbent	
Shri Nalin Upadhyay	13 May 2022	10 November 2024	
Shri Dinesh Dasa	1 February 2016	31 January 2022	
Hasmukh Joshi	6 June 2014	31 January 2016	
A B Mandavia	19 February 2004	14 February 2005	

== See also ==
- List of Public service commissions in India
