= Executive magistrate (India) =

Indian officials with executive magisterial powers

Executive Magistrate
- State Emblem of India

- Flag of India
- Status: Active
- Abbreviation: EM
- Member of: Executive branch of the State Government
- Appointer: State Government
- Constituting instrument: Bharatiya Nagarik Suraksha Sanhita, 2023

An executive magistrate is a person appointed by a State Government in India to exercise executive-magisterial powers under the Bharatiya Nagarik Suraksha Sanhita, 2023 (BNSS). The BNSS, which came into force on 1 July 2024, lists Executive Magistrates among its classes of criminal courts. The Act's application is subject to its special provision for Nagaland and specified tribal areas.

The Executive Magistrates have their differences with Judicial Magistrates. The Executive Magistrates fall under the executive/administrative branch and wield those powers granted to them by law, unlike the Judicial Magistrates who have criminal trial powers.

== History ==
Before Indian independence, District Magistrates appointed by the executive could both prosecute and adjudicate criminal matters. The separation of executive and judicial functions was a longstanding demand, and the Code of Criminal Procedure, 1973 created separate Judicial Magistrates while retaining Executive Magistrates for administrative and executive functions. The BNSS replaced the Code of Criminal Procedure and retained a separate executive-magistracy framework.

== Appointment and organization ==
The State Government can appoint as many Executive Magistrates as it deems fit in each district and appoint any one of them as the District Magistrate. It can also appoint an Executive Magistrate as an Additional District Magistrate, and also determine the powers of the District Magistrate that the additional magistrate shall exercise.

The State Government can appoint an Executive Magistrate to be in charge of a subdivision; such a person is referred to as a Sub-Divisional Magistrate. The State Government can also appoint special Executive Magistrates who will be persons of rank not lower than that of Superintendent of Police or any other equivalent ranks. The Act also allows the State Government, by another legislation, to vest in the Commissioner of Police the power of all or any Executive Magistrate.

Under the control of State Government, the District Magistrate determines the areas in which Executive Magistrates shall perform their powers, unless stated otherwise, their powers operate throughout the whole district. Executive Magistrates are subordinate to the District Magistrate. The Executive Magistrate performing power within a sub-division shall be subordinate to the Sub-Divisional Magistrate, but not the Sub-Divisional Magistrate him/herself.

== Powers ==
Bharatiya Nagarik Suraksha Sanhita assigns the Executive Magistrates specified preventive and public-order functions. Under section 126, an Executive Magistrate who receives information suggesting that a person may breach the peace or disturb public tranquility may require that person to show cause why they should not execute a bond or bail bond to keep the peace for up to one year.

Apart from this section, there are other sections in BNSS, which deal with dispersal of unlawful assembly, nuisance, emergency situations involving nuisances or dangers, and disputes regarding land or water, which might result in a breach of peace. Under Section 163, the order may be issued by the District Magistrate, the Sub-Divisional Magistrate, or any other Executive Magistrate authorized specially by the State Government in certain cases of emergency. Generally, such an order is valid for a maximum period of two months; however, the State Government may increase the duration of the order within the legal limit.

== Distinction from other Magistrates ==
There is a distinction between the appointments and administration of Executive Magistrates on one hand and that of Judicial Magistrates on the other. Executive Magistrates are appointed and controlled through the executive arm, whereas Judicial Magistrates operate under the judicial-magistracy framework. Executive Magistrates have been referred to in contemporary writings as being mainly preventive in nature.

== See also ==
- District magistrate
- Sub-divisional magistrate
- Magistrates in India
- Executive magistrate (Bangladesh)
