= West Bengal Public Service Commission =

State public service commission in India

Public Service Commission, West Bengal
- পশ্চিমবঙ্গ লোকসেবা আয়োগ

Constitutional body overview
- Formed: 1 April 1937; 89 years ago as Bengal Public Service Commission
- Jurisdiction: West Bengal
- Headquarters: 161/A, S.P Mukherjee Road, Kolkata, West Bengal, India; 22.5107388°N 88.3462555°E
- Motto: Satyameva Jayate
- Employees: 496 (2018-19)
- Constitutional body executive: Anil Verma, IAS (Retd.), Chairperson
- Key document: Constitution of India (Article 315)
- Website: psc.wb.gov.in

The Public Service Commission, West Bengal (WBPSC) is a constitutional body & government agency of the Indian state of West Bengal, responsible for the recruitment of candidates for various state government jobs, including the West Bengal Civil Service, through competitive examinations.

== Constitutional status ==
Articles 315 to 323 (Part XIV) of the Indian constitution, titled as Services Under the Union and the States, provide for a Public Service Commission for the Union and for each state.

=== Appointment ===
As per Article 316 of the Constitution of India provides that the chairman and other members of the commission shall be appointed by the Governor of West Bengal.

As per Article 319, a person who holds office as Chairman shall, on the expiration of his term of office, be ineligible for re-appointment to that office. But, a member other than the Chairman shall be eligible for appointment as the Chairman of the Commission.

=== Removal and suspension ===
As per Article 317, the Chairman or any other member of a Public Service Commission shall only be removed from their office by order of the President on the ground of "misbehaviour" after the Supreme Court, on reference being made to it by the President, has, on inquiry reported that the Chairman or such other member ought to be removed. The President may suspend the Chairman or other member of the Commission until report of the Supreme Court is received.

The President may also remove the Chairman or any other member of the commission if a member:

- is adjudged an insolvent; or
- engages during their term of office in any paid employment outside the duties of their office; or
- is, in the opinion of the President, unfit to continue in office by reason of infirmity of mind or body.
- The Chairman or any other member cannot hold an office of profit or otherwise they shall be deemed to be guilty of misbehaviour.

=== Functions ===
As per Article 320, it shall be the duty of the State Public Service Commissions to conduct examinations for appointments to the services of the respective states. It shall also assist two or more States, if requested so, in framing and operating schemes of joint recruitment for any services.

The State Public Service Commission shall be consulted:

- on all matters relating to
  - methods of recruitment to civil services and for civil posts
  - making appointments to civil services and posts
  - making promotions and transfers from one service to another
  - the suitability of candidates for such appointments, promotions or transfers

==== Expenses ====
As per Article 322, the expenses of the State Public Service Commission, including any salaries, allowances and pensions payable to or in respect of the members or staff of the Commission, shall be charged on the Consolidated Fund of the respective state.

=== Reporting ===
As per Article 323, it will be the duty of a State Commission to present annually to the Governor of the State a report as to the work done by the Commission, and it shall be the duty of a Joint Commission to present annually to the Governor of each of the States the needs of which are served by the Joint Commission a report as to the work done by the Commission in relation to that State, and in either case the Governor, shall, on receipt of such report, cause a copy thereof together with a memorandum explaining, as respects the cases, if any, where the advice of the Commission was not accepted, the reasons for such nonacceptance to be laid before the Legislature of the State.

== Members ==
As of October 2026, the Commission consists of the following members:

Name	Designation
Shri Anil Verma, IAS (Retd.)	Chairman
Sabir Siddhartha Ghaffar	Member
Shri Debashis Bandyopadhyay, WBCS (Exe.) (Retd.)	Member
Diganta Bagchi	Member
Barnali Mukherjee	Member
Shri Rajib Chattaraj, WBES (Retd.)	Member
Dr. Vipan Kumar Sood, IFS (Retd.)	Member

== Location ==
The office of the Public Service Commission, West Bengal is situated in Mudiali, Tollygunge area, Kolkata. The official address is 161A Shyama Prasad Mukherjee Road, Kolkata 700026.

Rabindra Sarobar metro station of Kolkata Metro Blue Line is the nearest metro station while Tollygunge railway station is the nearest railway station.

== Services ==
Madhyamik Level	Diploma Level	Graduate Level
PSC Clerkship; Food and Supply Sub Inspectors (Grade-III)	Junior Engineer (JE) Recruitment Examination	West Bengal Civil Service (WBCS); West Bengal Audit and Accounts Service (WBA&AS)^{[B]}; West Bengal Judicial Service (WBJS)^{[A]}; West Bengal Legal Service (WBLS)^{[A]}; West Bengal Forest Service (WBFS)^{[C]}; PSC Miscellaneous Service; Assistant Engineer (AE) Recruitment Examination^{[D]}; General Duty Medical Officer (GDMO) Recruitment Examination in ESI hospitals^{[E]}

- ^{A} Only candidates who have pursued a law degree are eligible to appear in the exam.
- ^{B} Candidates who hold a bachelor's degree in commerce are eligible to apply for this exam.
- ^{C} Candidates who possess a bachelor's degree in some selected science streams are eligible to apply for this exam.
- Pscwb generally take approximately 4 years to complete a recruitment, sometimes even more. Some of the recruitment even take 7 years to complete.
- ^{D} Candidates who have pursued B.E/B.Tech Degree in Core Engineering Branches.
- ^{E} Candidates who have pursued MBBS Degree recognized by NMC/State Medical Councils.

== See also ==
- Public service commissions in India
- Union Public Service Commission
- West Bengal Civil Service
- List of Public service commissions in India
