= Assistant commissioner =

= Assistant Commissioner in Pakistan =
An Assistant Commissioner (AC) is an important administrative officer in Pakistan who plays a key role in maintaining law and order, supervising government administration, and ensuring the effective delivery of public services at the tehsil or sub-divisional level.

Assistant Commissioners work under the supervision of the Deputy Commissioner (DC) and are responsible for implementing government policies, coordinating with various government departments, and addressing public concerns. They serve as an important link between the district administration and local communities.

== Roles and Responsibilities ==
The main responsibilities of an Assistant Commissioner in Pakistan include:

- Law and Order: Coordinating with police and other law enforcement agencies to maintain peace and public order.
- Revenue Administration: Supervising land revenue matters, monitoring revenue collection, and overseeing relevant administrative functions.
- Price Control: Conducting market inspections to monitor prices and prevent profiteering and hoarding.
- Public Service Delivery: Ensuring that government services and development initiatives reach local communities.
- Encroachment Operations: Supervising operations against illegal encroachments on public land and roads.
- Government Administration: Implementing government policies, monitoring departmental performance, and coordinating with local authorities.
- Public Grievances: Addressing citizens' complaints and helping resolve local administrative issues.

== How to Become an Assistant Commissioner in Pakistan ==
Becoming an Assistant Commissioner in Pakistan generally involves joining the civil service through competitive examinations. Candidates can pursue the Central Superior Services (CSS) examination conducted by the Federal Public Service Commission (FPSC) and qualify for the Pakistan Administrative Service (PAS). Provincial competitive examinations are another route through which candidates may enter provincial administrative services.

After selection, officers undergo professional training and are assigned administrative responsibilities. Appointment as an Assistant Commissioner depends on the relevant service structure, cadre, and government postings.

For a complete guide, eligibility criteria, educational requirements, examinations, and the selection process, read:

How to Become an Assistant Commissioner in Pakistan

== Importance of Assistant Commissioners ==
Assistant Commissioners are an essential part of Pakistan's administrative structure. Their work directly affects local governance, public welfare, revenue administration, and the implementation of government policies. By supervising administrative activities and addressing public issues, they contribute to effective governance and the development of communities across Pakistan.
