= Public ministry =

Public ministry may refer to:

== Christianity ==
- Public ministry of Jesus
- Public ministers in Christian churches, such as pastors and priests. This term is used especially in State Churches or churches derived from State Churches, where the position is given a similar term as Civil servants and secular officials

== Government ==
- Public office
- Public official who holds the office
- Civil service
- Public Ministry (Brazil), the Brazilian body of independent public prosecutors
- Public Ministry (France), the French body of public prosecutors
- Public Ministry (Netherlands), the body of public prosecutors in the Netherlands
- Public Ministry (Portugal), the Portuguese body of independent public prosecutors
- Prosecution Ministry, the Spanish body of independent public prosecutors
