= Public Force =

Organization legally permitted to use force in service of public interests

A Public Force is a force which has a legitimate and legalised use of physical force in order to serve the public interests.

The term is broad and loosely defined. Public force could be used to refer to either police or military forces.

== Original use of the term ==
The first use of the concept of a public force, in French Force Publique, is in the Declaration of the Rights of Man and of the Citizen of 1789.

Article XIII - For the maintenance of the public force and for the expenditures of administration, a common contribution is indispensable; it must be equally distributed between all the citizens, by reason of their faculties [i.e., ability to pay].

The declaration sought to regulate the relationship between the citizen and the legitimate use of violence. In contrast to similar declarations of rights from Anglo-Saxon countries, the emphasis is on the citizen's duty to contribute to the existence of such a force, rather than on the citizen's rights vis-a-vis such a force.

== Further use of the term ==
The concept was also used in other countries, e.g. in Thomas Jefferson's Sixth State of the Union Address.

Force Publique was the title of the colonial army and gendarmerie of the Congo Free State and Belgian Congo from 1885 to 1960 (see: Public Force (Congo)).

The term has been used as a designation for police or military forces in other countries, e.g. Panama and Costa Rica, and is commonly used as a conceptual term in several countries, e.g. France and Morocco.

== Examples ==
=== Active ===
- Panamanian Public Forces

=== Defunct ===
- Force Publique

== See also ==
- List of established military terms
- Gendarmerie
- Home guard
- Paramilitary
