= Economic and Social Council =

Economic and Social Council might refer to:

- Economic, Social and Cultural Council, an advisory body of the African Union
- Economic and Social Council (Arab League), an institution of the Arab League
- Social and Economic Council, an advisory council of the Dutch government
- European Economic and Social Committee, a consultative body of the European Union
- French Economic, Social and Environmental Council, a consultative assembly
- Economic and Social Council (Spain), an advisory body of the Government of Spain
- Economic and Social Research Council, one of the seven Research Councils in the United Kingdom
- United Nations Economic and Social Council (ECOSOC), one of the principal organs of the United Nations
- Economic and Social Council (Dominican Republic), an advisory body of the Government of the Dominican Republic
- National Council for Economics and Labour, a consultative assembly of Italy
- International Association of Economic and Social Councils and Similar Institutions, an association of national consultative institutions
