= Constitutional institution =

Government organ established directly by constitution

A constitutional institution, constitutional body or constitutional organ is a government institution created by a constitution. As these institutions derives its powers, duties and responsibilities directly from the constitution, which is harder to be amended by legislature compared to sub-constitutional laws, their status is rather more stable and independent than institutions created by sub-constitutional laws.

== By country ==
Role of the constitutional institutions inside government reflects each constitution's national context and identity.

=== Germany ===
According to the German constitution, only five institutions are regarded as constitutional institutions (German: Verfassungorgane) in German federal government, reflecting classic structure for separation of powers; Bundesrat and Bundestag of German legislature, President and Cabinet of German executive, and Federal Constitutional Court of German judiciary.

=== South Africa ===
Modern constitution such as South African constitution creates various government institutions directly by itself, which has similar role as independent agency in classic government structure. This so called 'Chapter nine institutions' of South Africa are explained as constitutional attempt to guarantee accountability of government, yet there are also worries as these new 'constitutionally independent' agencies can create tensions inside separation of powers between traditional branches and institutions of South African government. These modern independent agencies created directly by constitution sometimes fails to achieve its expected role, as their level of institutional independence varies according to specific political situations.

== Examples of constitutional institutions ==
- Constitutional body (Germany)
- Constitutional body (India)
- Constitutional institutions (Italy)
  - Institutions of constitutional importance (Italy)
- Chapter nine institutions (South Africa)
- Constitutional organizations of Thailand

== Types of constitutional institutions ==
Any of the following institutions may be established by constitutions. Constitutions have become increasingly detailed since the third wave of democratization, as additional institutions have been added to deepen the separation of powers.

Branches of government:

- Legislative chambers
- Executive entities, including:
  - Heads of state and government
  - Institutions with minimum prescribed qualifications or a mandatory consultative status, such as attorneys or advocates general, national security councils, economic and social councils, and privy councils
  - Public forces such as the military and national police. Their duties and command hierarchy may be codified in order to specify civilian control, service obligations, a clear monopoly on violence, and/or separation of military and police roles. A few constitutions, such as those of Brazil, Iran, and Ukraine, establish specialist law enforcement agencies.
- Supreme and constitutional courts

Other independent institutions whose officials enjoy security of tenure:

- Election commissions
- Supreme audit institutions
- Civil service commissions
- Councils of the judiciary
- Labor courts
- Public ministries and directors of public prosecutions
- Ombudsmen and human rights commissions

== See also ==
- Separation of Powers
- Independent agency
