= Sub-divisional magistrate =

Head of a sub-division in India

Sub-Divisional Magistrate
- State Emblem of India

- Flag of India

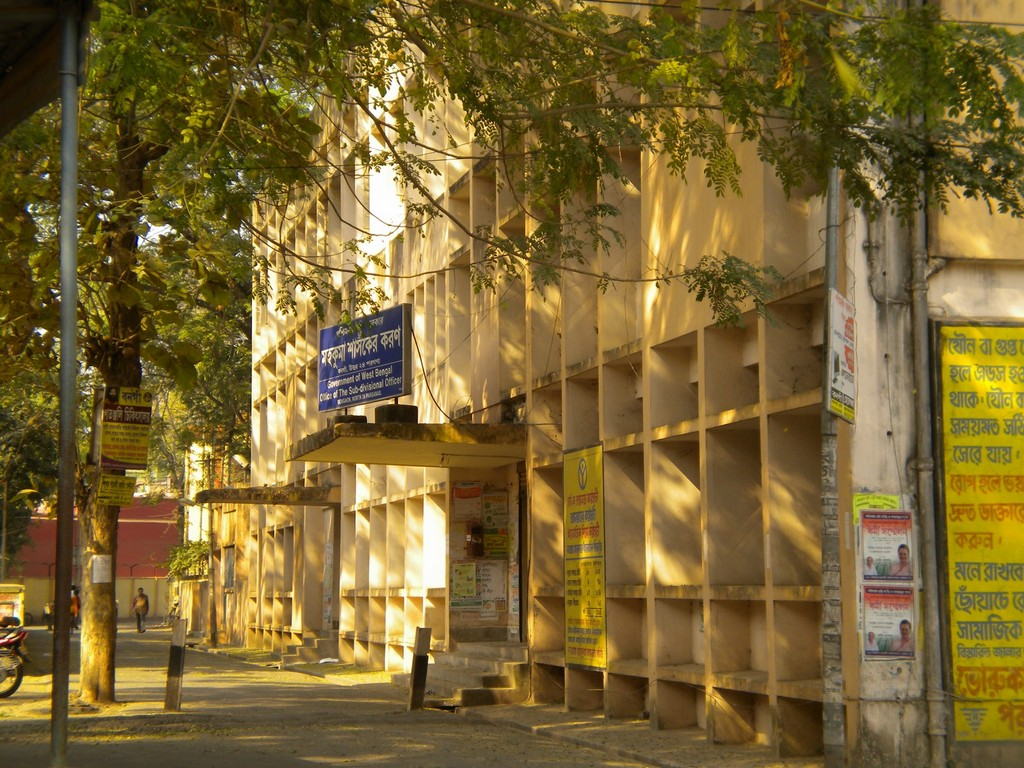
- Sub-Divisional Office, Bangaon
- Status: Active
- Abbreviation: SDM/SDO(Revenue)
- Member of: Indian Administrative Service; State Administrative Services (Deputy Collector)
- Reports to: District magistrate District collector Deputy commissioner
- Appointer: President of India (IAS) Governor (state services)
- Constituting instrument: Bharatiya Nagarik Suraksha Sanhita, 2023; Land Revenue Act
- Deputy: Tehsildar

A Sub-Divisional Magistrate, also known as Sub-Divisional officer, assistant collector, sub collector, revenue divisional officer, or assistant commissioner, is the administrative head of a sub-division in an Indian district, exercising executive, revenue, and magisterial duties. The specific name depends on the state or union territory. The primary responsibilities include land revenue collection, land revenue administration, disaster management, election, maintaining law and order, overseeing developmental activities and coordinating various departments within a sub-division.

The post is held by officers of the Indian Administrative Service (IAS), and sometimes, by officers of state administrative services. These officers are subordinate to a district magistrate, also known as district collector or deputy commissioner, who serves as the administrative head of a district. The magisterial powers of a sub-divisional magistrate are drawn from the Bharatiya Nagarik Suraksha Sanhita, 2023.

== Functions ==
=== Collection of land and canal revenue ===
It involves maintenance of land records, conduct of revenue cases, carrying out of demarcation and mutations, settlement operations and functioning as custodian of public land. They are primarily responsible for day to day revenue management (land and canal). The subordinate revenue staff consisting of revenue assistants (land & canal) supervised by revenue inspectors (land and canal) who are in turn supervised by revenue circle officers (land and canal) who are involved in field level revenue activities and mutations. They are also empowered to issue various kinds of statutory certificates including SC/ST and OBC, Domicile, Nationality etc. Registration of Property documents, sale deeds, power of attorneys, share certificates and all other documents which need to be compulsorily registered as per law is made at Sub Registrar's Office which are nine in numbers. Deputy Commissioners are Registrars for their respective districts and exercise supervisory control over the Sub Registrars.

=== Maintenance of law and order ===
Assistant Collector cum Sub Divisional Magistrates exercise powers of Executive Magistrates. In this role they are responsible for operating preventive Sections of Bharatiya Nagarik Suraksha Sanhita. They also carry out enquiries in cases of unnatural deaths of women within seven years of marriage and issue directions to the Police for registration of case, if required.

Sub Divisional Magistrates are empowered to conduct enquiries into custodial deaths including deaths in Police Lock Up, Jails, Women Homes etc. The Officers of this Department are also expected to act as eyes and ears of the Government and conduct enquiries into all major accidents including major fires incidents, riots and natural calamities etc.

=== Disaster management ===
This department is given the primary responsibility for relief and rehabilitation operations in any calamity whether natural or man-made. It is also responsible for coordinating and implementing disaster management plan for natural and chemical disasters and awareness generation programme on disaster preparedness is being carried out with the assistance of United Nations Development

== Nomenclature ==
The term "Sub Divisional Magistrate" (SDM) is used in some states of India to refer to a government official who is responsible for revenue administration and other related functions at the sub-divisional level. However, the nomenclature and role of SDMs may vary from state to state. Here are some of the different names of SDMs in Indian states:

Assistant Commissioner (AC)- In Assam and Karnataka, the SDM is known as Assistant Commissioner.
Sub Divisional Officer(Revenue)(SDO) - This is the term used for SDMs in many states such as West Bengal, Bihar, Jharkhand, Manipur, Mizoram, Nagaland, etc.
Sub Divisional Magistrate (SDM) - This term is used in states such as Haryana, Punjab, Uttar Pradesh, Rajasthan, Madhya Pradesh, Gujarat and Jammu and Kashmir.
Sub Collector - In some states such as Andhra Pradesh, Odisha, Telangana, Tamil Nadu and Kerala the SDM is referred to as Sub Collector.
Revenue Divisional Officer (RDO) - In some states such as Kerala and Tamil Nadu. the sub collector is also known as Revenue Divisional Officer (RDO).

When a state cadre or Kerala Administrative Service (KAS) officer is the officer in charge of a revenue division, the same post is also called Revenue Divisional Officer (RDO). RDO has the same function, role and responsibilities as SDM. Assistant collector or assistant magistrate is a probationary posting for trainees.

== See also ==
- Administrative division
- Table of administrative country subdivisions by country
