= District magistrate =

Executive head of an Indian district

- Flag of India

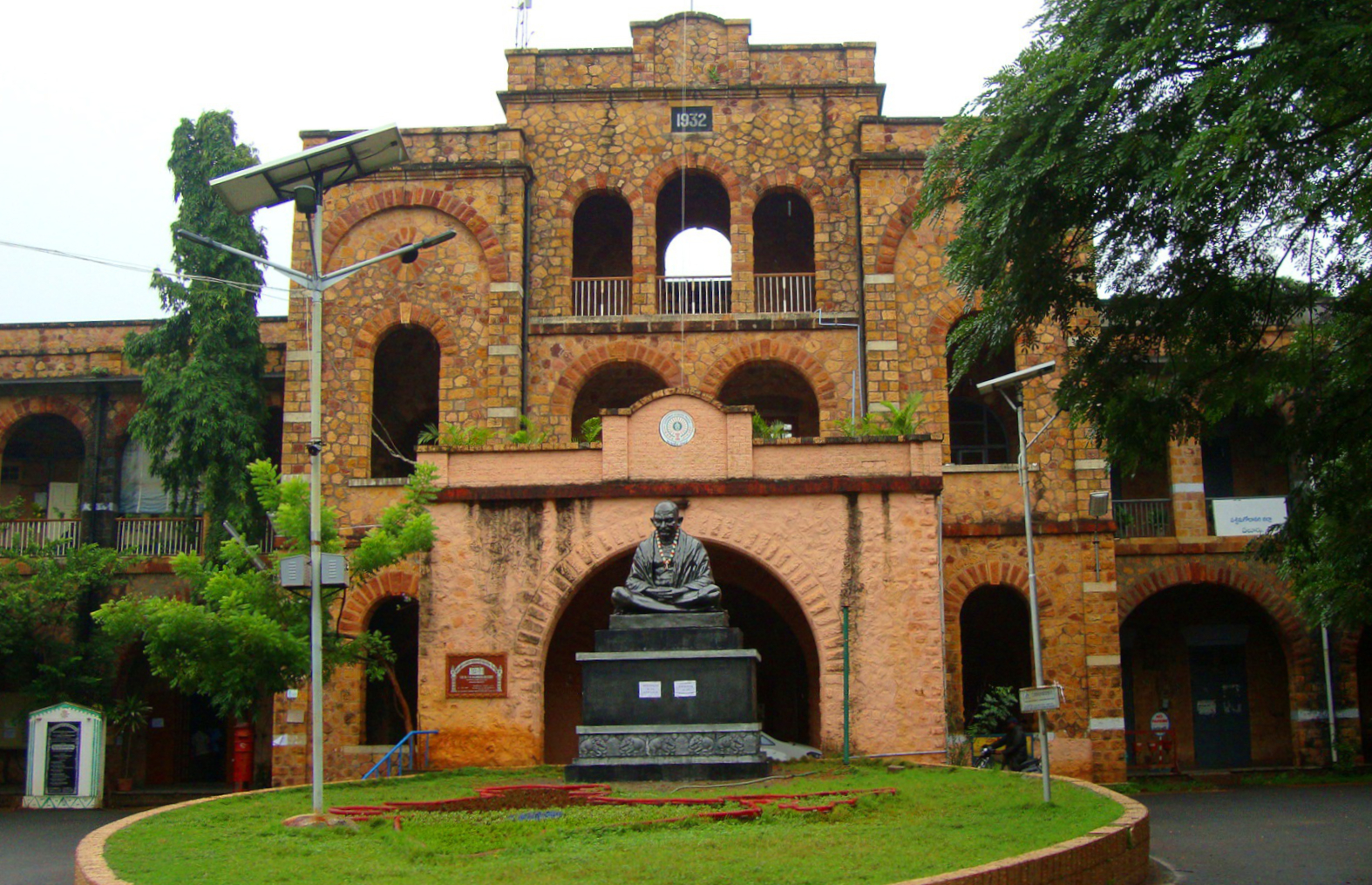
- Collector's office in Eluru
- Type: Executive Head of the district
- Abbreviation: DM/DC
- Member of: Indian Administrative Service; State Civil Services
- Reports to: Divisional commissioner (where such a post exists); Revenue Commissioner
- Seat: Collectorate
- Appointer: Governors of the respective States; on the advice of the State Government
- Constituting instrument: Bharatiya Nagarik Suraksha Sanhita (BNSS); Land Revenue Act of the respective states
- Formation: August 15, 1772; 254 years ago
- Deputy: Additional collector Additional district magistrate Additional deputy commissioner Deputy collector
- Salary: ₹78,800 (US$840) to ₹118,500 (US$1,300) and various other allowances and facilities

The District magistrate, also known as the District collector or Deputy commissioner or District Commissioner, is a career civil servant (Note: A district magistrate is either a member of IAS or State Civil Service appointed by Government of State Governments of India in that respective state.) who serves as the executive head of a district's administration in India. The specific name depends on the state or union territory. Each of these posts has distinct responsibilities, and an officer can assume all of these roles at once. The district magistrate is primarily responsible for maintaining law and order, while the district collector focuses on land revenue administration, and the deputy commissioner is in charge of overseeing developmental activities and coordinates government departments. Additionally, they also serve as election officers, registrar, marriage officer, licensing authority, and managing disaster responses, among other things. While the specific scope of duties may vary from state to state, they are generally similar. The district magistrate comes under the general supervision of divisional commissioner.

== History ==
Warren Hastings introduced the office of the District Collector in the Judicial Plan of 1772. By the Judicial Plan of 1774, the office of the Collector cum District Magistrate was temporarily renamed Diwan or Amil. The term Collector was brought back under the Judicial Plan of 1787. The name, Collector, derived from the holder being the head of the revenue organization (tax collection) for the district. With the passage of the Government of India Act 1858, by the British Parliament.

Sir George Campbell, lieutenant-governor of Bengal from 1871 to 1874, intended "to render the heads of districts no longer the drudges of many departments and masters of none, but in fact the general controlling authority over all departments in each district."

The office of a collector during the British Raj held multiple responsibilities – as collector, he was the head of the revenue organization, charged with registration, alteration, and partition of holdings; the settlement of disputes; the management of indebted estates; loans to agriculturists, and famine relief. As district magistrate, he exercised general supervision over the inferior courts and in particular, directed the police work. The office was meant to achieve the "peculiar purpose" of collecting revenue and of keeping the peace. The superintendent of police (SP), inspector general of jails, the surgeon general, the divisional forest officer (DFO) and the Executive Engineer PWD (EE) had to inform the collector of every activity in their departments.

Until the later part of the nineteenth century, no native was eligible to become a district collector. But with the introduction of open competitive examinations for the Indian Civil Service, the office was opened to natives. Romesh Chandra Dutt, Sripad Babaji Thakur, Anandaram Baruah, Krishna Govinda Gupta and Brajendranath De were the first five Indian ICS officers to become Collectors.

The district continued to be the unit of administration after India gained independence in 1947. The role of the district collector remained largely unchanged, except for the separation of most judicial powers to judicial officers of the district. Later, with the promulgation of the National Extension Services and Community Development Programme by the Nehru government in 1952, the district collector was entrusted with the additional responsibility of implementing the Government of India's development programs in the district.

=== Nomenclature ===
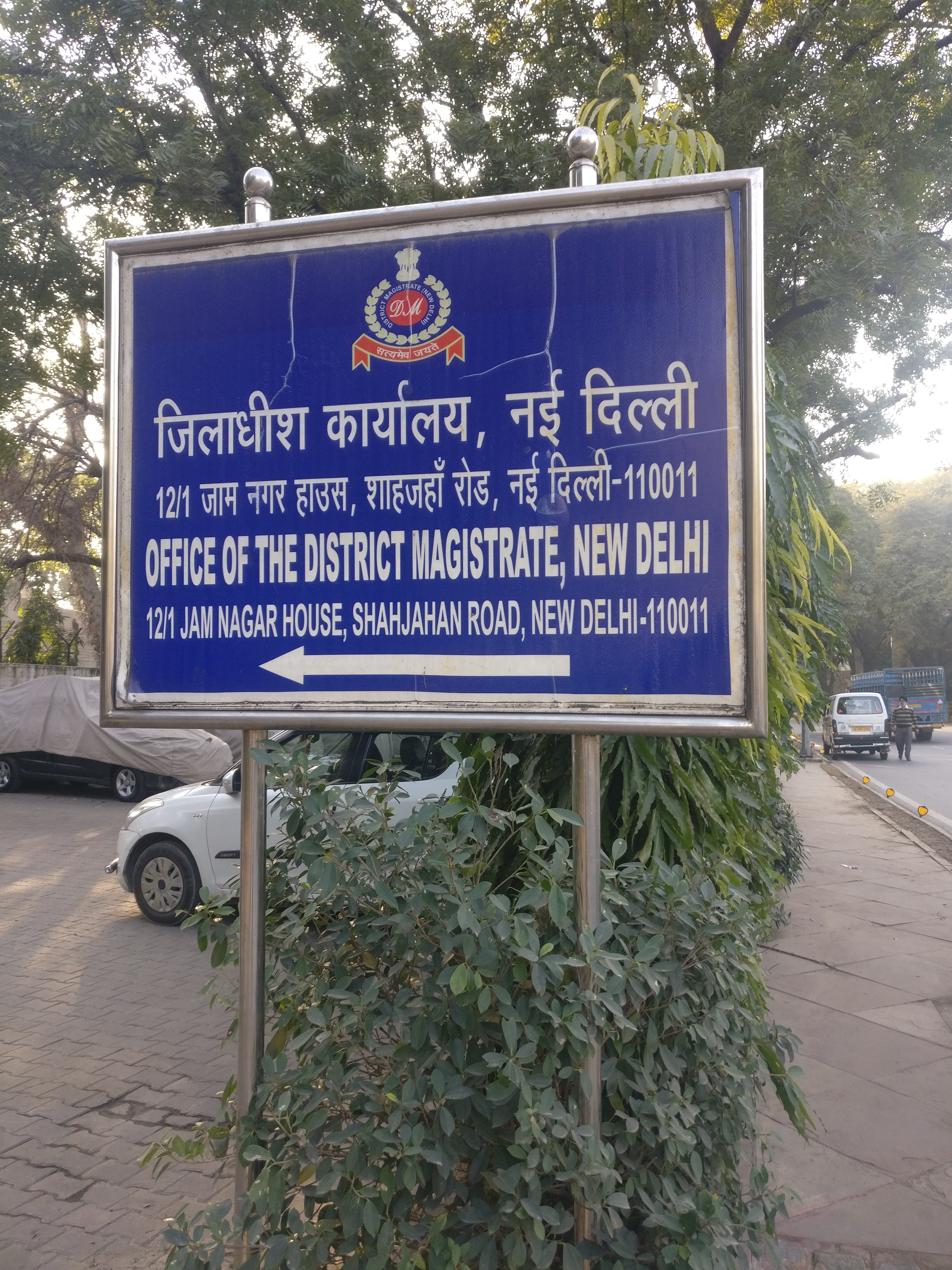
A bilingual signboard of the District Magistrate (DM) office in New Delhi

The nomenclature of the office of the district head is a legacy of the administrative practices of British India. Although the functions and powers of the officer were largely uniform across the country, the designation often reflected the primary responsibility associated with the office in a particular province. In the Bengal Presidency, the post was known as District Magistrate and Collector, whereas in the Bombay Presidency and the Central Provinces it was generally referred to as the District Collector, even though the officer also exercised magisterial powers. In the Madras Presidency, the office was more commonly styled simply as Collector.

In the United Provinces, where the maintenance of law and order was regarded as the foremost duty, the designation District Magistrate came into use and continues in present-day Uttar Pradesh. In several non-regulation provinces such as Punjab, Burma, Assam and Oudh, a simplified system of administration was followed, with many provisions of the Criminal Procedure Code kept in abeyance. In these regions, the District Magistrate also functioned as the District and Sessions Judge, and the office came to be designated as the Deputy Commissioner. This usage arose because such provinces were administered by a Chief Commissioner, who combined the roles of Governor and High Court by exercising both executive and judicial authority.

After Independence, these different designations have continued, even though the responsibilities and powers of the office are substantially the same throughout India:

Deputy Commissioner (DC): Used in states and union territories such as Karnataka, Assam, Meghalaya, Mizoram, Nagaland, Jammu and Kashmir, Punjab, Haryana, Delhi, Himachal Pradesh, Jharkhand and Arunachal Pradesh.

District Collector (DC): Used in Kerala, Tamil Nadu, Telangana, Andhra Pradesh, Goa, Maharashtra, Sikkim, Odisha, Gujarat, Puducherry and Lakshadweep.

District Magistrate (DM): Used in Uttar Pradesh, Madhya Pradesh, Uttarakhand, West Bengal, Rajasthan, Bihar, Tripura and Chhattisgarh.

== Posting ==
They are posted by the state government, from among the pool of Indian Administrative Service (IAS) and State Civil Services (SCS) officers, who either are on Level 11, Level 12 or Level 13 of the Pay Matrix, in the state. The members of the IAS are either directly recruited by the Union Public Service Commission, promoted from State Civil Service (SCS) or nominated from Non-State Civil Service (Non-SCS). The direct recruits are posted as Collectors after five to six years of service. SCS officers are also posted as Collectors when they attain at least the Selection Grade (Level 13 Grade Pay) in their service. A District Magistrate and Collector is transferred to and from the post by the state government.

The salary of a District Collector/District Magistrate is governed by the IAS pay scale as per the 7th Central Pay Commission. Officers in the Senior Time Scale (Level 11) receive a basic pay ranging from ₹67,700 to ₹2,08,700. At the Junior Administrative Grade (Level 12), the pay scale increases to ₹78,800–₹2,09,200. With further seniority, officers reach the Selection Grade (Level 13), where the basic pay ranges from ₹1,23,100 to ₹2,15,900. In addition to the basic pay, officers are entitled to allowances like Dearness Allowance, House Rent Allowance, and Travel Allowance, significantly enhancing their total salary.

=== Personal Staff ===
The District Collector/District Magistrate is provided with Personal Security Officers (PSOs), including armed guards, to ensure their safety and protection.

The District Collector/District Magistrate has personal staff, including a Personal Assistant (PA), a Secretary, and other support staff like clerks, peons, and drivers.

== Functions and responsibilities ==
The District Collector holds a diverse range of responsibilities that are defined under various laws and regulations, including the Land Revenue Act, Revenue recovery rules, Land acquisition act, Bharatiya Nagarik Suraksha Sanhita (BNSS), the Arms Act, 1959, The Cinematograph Act, Registration Act, peoples representation act, and other relevant acts. They are entrusted with land revenue administration, maintaining law and order, managing district administration, and implementing government policies and also they are incharge of various state and central government schemes and projects at district level. The responsibilities assigned to a district magistrate vary from state to state, but generally, Collectors, under the general supervision of divisional commissioners (where such a post exists), are entrusted with a wide range of duties in the jurisdiction of the district, generally involving the following:

=== As District Magistrate ===
- The District Magistrate acts as the primary executive magistrate of the district. Their main responsibility is to take preventive measures to maintain law and order and maintain peace in the district.
- Issuance of adoption orders under the provisions of the Juvenile Justice Act, 2015 with provision of appeal to divisional commissioners.
- The district Magistrate has the authority to issue orders under Section 163 of the BNSS, restricting the assembly of people to prevent potential disturbances.
- Under the National Security Act (NSA), the district magistrate has the authority to order preventive detention of individuals to prevent them from acting in any manner prejudicial to the security of the state or maintenance of public order.
- Granting and renewing arms and ammunition licence under Arms Act with provision of appeal to divisional commissioners.
- Granting license to cinemas under Cinematograph Act, 1952 with provision of appeal to divisional commissioners.
- Heads the district disaster management authority constituted under the Disaster Management Act, 2005.
- Enforcement of various provisions of Telecommunications Act, 2023
- Implementation of provisions of Maintenance & welfare of parents & senior citizens act, 2007
- Enforcement of mines act, 1952
- Supervision of jails in the district.
- Supervises all Executive Magistrates in the district and has very limited control over police.

=== As District Collector ===
- District Collector is the highest officer of revenue department in the district. The collector is the highest authority of revenue administration.
- Responsible for collecting land revenue, government taxes, fees, and all dues recoverable as arrears of land revenue.
- Responsible for land acquisition, revenue recovery, land reforms, and other land related matters.
- Ensures accurate and up-to-date records of land rights.Implements land reforms and exercises power as the land acquisition officer.
- Supervises treasury and sub-treasury operations.
- Enforces the Stamp Act and acts as a custodian of government lands.
- Acts as a protocol officer and empowers the Collector to recover government dues from defaulters residing in the district with property.
- Responsible for disaster management in the district. Primarily tasked with relief and rehabilitation operations in any calamity whether natural or man-mde.
- Act as a returning officer for parliament constituency; overall incharge of conducting of election in the district.
- Enforcement of Essential Commodities Act, 1955
- To be guardian of a minor under Guardians and wards act.

=== Other Functions ===
1. District Election Officer (DEO)
2. Chairs various committees at the district level.
3. Chairperson, Regional Transport Authority
4. Chairperson, District Road Safety Authority
5. Chairperson, District Tourism Promotion Council
6. Chairperson, District Disaster Management Authority
7. Chairperson, District Development Council (DDC)

== Separation from judiciary ==
While almost all of the 741 Indian districts are headed by DMs, constitutional developments post Independence in 1947 have led to a reduction in power and realignment of roles for the District Magistrate. The first major change came about in the early 1960s as the Judiciary was separated from the Executive in most Indian states in line with Article 50 of the Constitution of India. This meant that DMs and SDMs could no longer try criminal cases or commit accused to Sessions Court. Their place was taken by Chief Judicial Magistrates and Sub Divisional Judicial Magistrates. The District Magistrate was now the main Executive Magistrate of the district - charged with taking preventive measures for maintenance of law and order. Indirectly, this led to a loss of direct control over the police which now depended on the District Judge and the Judicial Magistrates. This change was institutionalised by the Code of Criminal Procedure, 1973. In the Union Territories and the North Eastern states, Collectors continued to exercise judicial power for much longer. A separate district judiciary was not created till 1978 in Delhi, 2008 in Mizoram, 2016 in Arunachal Pradesh and 2020 in Meghalaya. South Garo Hills District in Meghalaya, the last remaining district of India with the District Magistrate also exercising judicial powers, finally got a separate District and Sessions Court on 17 December 2020.

== Restructure ==
The need to restructure the roles of the District Collector is for removing the colonial legacy, corruption, promoting uniformity, devolving power to local bodies, ensuring separation of power, mitigating power concentration, addressing status quoist tendencies, and advancing grass-root democracy.

There have also been many instances where at lower levels, district magistrates have pressurized victims or their family members, especially if they belong to the marginalized community

== Criticism and Calls for Reform ==
Former IAS officer T. R. Raghunandan has criticised the continued centralised role of the district collector/district magistrate, arguing that it is outdated and impedes participative governance and development. In an article published in The Print in 2025, he stated that the Indian Administrative Service has perpetuated what he described as a “myth of the collector’s infallibility,” which sidelines local governments and concentrates administrative power in a single officer.

Raghunandan highlighted the administrative burden faced by collectors, noting that they chair dozens of committees in states such as Andhra Pradesh and Assam. He also cited a reform experiment in Karnataka (1987–1992) where collectors were made subordinate to elected Zilla Parishad chiefs, which did not result in governance failures as some had feared. Overall, he argued that although constitutional amendments have sought to strengthen local governance, there has been limited political will to reduce the collector’s authority or fully empower local governments.

Raghunandan argued that the IAS has resisted decentralisation and retained control, despite constitutional provisions for empowering local governments.

== Exception ==
Kolkata in West Bengal does not have a conventional collector. A recently created post with the same name performs the functions of collector of stamp revenue, registration and certain other miscellaneous functions. The Magisterial powers are exercised by a Police Commissioner, one of the earliest such posts in British India, while the Kolkata Municipal Corporation takes care of all other responsibilities.

== See also ==
- All India Service
  - Indian Administrative Service
  - Indian Police Service
  - Indian Forest Service
- Chief Secretary (India)
- Principal Secretary (India)
- Divisional Commissioner
- Municipal commissioner
- Sub-Divisional Magistrate
- List of districts in India

== Bibliography ==
- Singh, G.P. (1993). Revenue administration in India: A case study of Bihar. Delhi: Mittal Publications. ISBN 978-8170993810.
- Maheshwari, S.R. (2000). Indian Administration (6th ed.). New Delhi: Orient Blackswan Private Ltd. ISBN 9788125019886.
- Laxmikanth, M. (2014). Governance in India (2nd ed.). Noida: McGraw Hill Education. ISBN 978-9339204785.
- Arora, Ramesh K. (2011). Indian Public Administration: Institutions and Issues. New Delhi: New Age International. ISBN 978-8122434460.
