= List of paper leaks in India =

List of paper leaks in Indian public examinations

Paper leaks in Indian public examinations cover documented incidents across higher education entrance examinations, professional licensing tests, and government recruitment tests. Between 2000 and 2026, 188+ public examination paper leak incidents have been documented across India, with significant concentrations in central examinations as well as state-level recruitment tests across northern and western states.

== Overview ==
Jurisdiction	Documented incidents
All India	37
Madhya Pradesh	18
Uttar Pradesh	17
Rajasthan	14
Bihar	10
Maharashtra	9
Karnataka	8
Haryana	7
Gujarat	7
Punjab	6
Uttarakhand	6
Jharkhand	6
Delhi	5
Odisha	5
Himachal Pradesh	4
Jammu and Kashmir	4
Tamil Nadu	4
Assam	3
West Bengal	3
Telangana	3
Chhattisgarh	2
Manipur	2
Arunachal Pradesh	2
Nagaland	1
Meghalaya	1
Chandigarh	1
Kerala	1
Andhra Pradesh	1
Tripura	1
Total	188

== List of incidents ==
Date	Examination	Conducting body	Jurisdiction	Official response	Details
January 6, 2002	AIIMS Post-Graduate Medical Entrance Examination 2002	All India Institute of Medical Sciences (AIIMS)	All India	Probe (CBI), Arrests/FIR.	Question papers for the AIIMS post-graduate medical entrance examination held on 6 January 2002 were leaked and sold to candidates in Patna and Lucknow for ₹75,000–1 lakh; following a petition by medicos, the Delhi High Court ordered a CBI probe into the conspiracy on 6 June 2002.
August 18, 2002	RRB Probationary Assistant Station Master Examination 2002	Railway Recruitment Board (RRB), Mumbai	All India	Exam cancelled, Probe (CBI), Arrests/FIR, Conviction	CBI registered a case on 17 August 2002 after question papers for the Probationary Assistant Station Master test were leaked and sold for ₹50,000–1 lakh; Western Railway cancelled the 18 August exam, and in July 2025 an Ahmedabad CBI special court convicted eight former Western Railway employees to five years of imprisonment each.
November 23, 2003	Common Admission Test (CAT) 2003	Indian Institutes of Management (IIMs)	All India	Exam cancelled, Retest, Arrests/FIR, Probe (CBI)	CBI busted a nationwide question-paper leak syndicate on 23 November 2003, seizing leaked CAT question papers and answer keys sold at a Delhi hotel for ₹2–4 lakh; IIMs cancelled the exam after leaked papers were found matching the originals; four persons including three doctors were arrested.
January 4, 2004	RRB Group-D recruitment examination 2004	Railway Recruitment Board (RRB), Patna	All India	Exam cancelled, Probe (CBI), Arrests/FIR	Railways abruptly cancelled the Group-D recruitment examination for 10,000 gangman posts across centres in Bihar, West Bengal, and Uttar Pradesh after CBI DIG provided handwritten copies of leaked questions matching originals; about 2.76 lakh candidates were scheduled to appear.
April 11, 2004	All India Pre-Medical Test (AIPMT/CBSE-PMT) 2004	Central Board of Secondary Education (CBSE)	All India	Exam cancelled, Arrests/FIR, Probe (CBI/SIT)	Physics and chemistry papers leaked in New Delhi 10–14 hours before the 11 April 2004 exam and matched the originals; CBSE cancelled the test nationally, the HRD Minister ordered a CBI probe, two were arrested and 13 candidates detained.
June 1, 2006	Himachal Pradesh Combined Pre-Medical Test (HP-CPMT) 2006	Himachal Pradesh University	Himachal Pradesh	Arrests/FIR	Police investigating the HP-CPMT medical entrance leak, linked to a tout network and a Lucknow printing press, found evidence of a ₹7 lakh post-dated cheque paid to a tout to guarantee a medical college seat.
August 5, 2007	ICAI CA Common Proficiency Test (CPT) 2007	Institute of Chartered Accountants of India (ICAI)	All India	Arrests/FIR, Conviction	Question paper delivered to a DAV Public School centre in New Delhi was unsealed on 30 July 2007 and distributed to aspirants for money; a television sting operation exposed the leak. A Metropolitan Magistrate court in Delhi convicted former principal Bhawna Malik, centre superintendent Diksha Dhingra and invigilator provider Sudesh Kumar under IPC 420 & 120(B) in June 2022.
September 1, 2008	NPSC Nagaland Civil Services & Police Services (Main) Examination 2008	Nagaland Public Service Commission	Nagaland	Results nullified, FIR, Suspension	NPSC uncovered systemic swapping and tampering of answer scripts for the 2008 NCS, NPS & Allied Services (Main) and Lecturer recruitment examinations; the Commission suspended an assistant superintendent and upper division assistant, nullified the results of 11 candidates, and registered an FIR with the state police.
September 7, 2008	Vyapam Patwari Recruitment Examination 2008	Madhya Pradesh Professional Examination Board (Vyapam)	Madhya Pradesh	Arrests/FIR, Probe (CBI/SIT)	Accused produced forged educational certificates to fake eligibility and secure patwari posts; CBI court sentenced 10 to five years of rigorous imprisonment (RI) each (December 2025).
December 14, 2008	RRB recruitment examinations 2008 (assistant loco driver and other posts, Allahabad)	Railway Recruitment Board (RRB), Allahabad	All India	Exam cancelled, Arrests/FIR, Probe (STF)	UP STF raided an exam centre outside Allahabad hours before the 14 December 2008 tests, arresting alleged kingpin Bedi Ram and 10 others, then detaining over 270 candidates who had already bought the leaked papers for ₹1–2 lakh each; the exams for about 37,000 candidates were cancelled.
February 1, 2009	Meghalaya Education Department Recruitment Examination (White Ink Scam) 2009	Meghalaya Education Department	Meghalaya	Selection list quashed by High Court, Probe (CBI), Chargesheet	Meghalaya High Court quashed proceedings in 2025 in the 2009 White Ink Scam case, wherein the CBI had filed a chargesheet alleging manipulation of recruitment results and mark alteration using correction fluid ("white ink") during the tenure of the Education Minister.
February 15, 2009	RRB Assistant Station Master Examination 2009 (Ajmer Zone)	Railway Recruitment Board (RRB), Ajmer Zone	All India	Exam postponed, Arrests/FIR	A racket leaking Railway Recruitment Board papers was busted in raids at Jaipur and Bhopal on the day of the exam, with 109 people arrested including some candidates; the three-state operation acted on a tip-off from Uttar Pradesh Police. RRB Ajmer chairman C. L. Bharti postponed the Assistant Station Master written test, with a new date to be announced.
July 8, 2009	MP Pre-Medical Test (PMT) 2009	Madhya Pradesh Professional Examination Board (Vyapam)	Madhya Pradesh	Arrests/FIR, Probe (CBI/SIT)	Vyapam PMT-2009 exam saw impersonation and fraudulent admissions; a candidate and their proxy solver were convicted and sentenced in Dec 2024 to five years' rigorous imprisonment by a special CBI court in Indore for rigging the 8 June 2009 examination.
January 1, 2010	UPPSC Additional Private Secretary (APS) Examination 2010	Uttar Pradesh Public Service Commission (UPPSC)	Uttar Pradesh	Probe (CBI), FIR registered, Raids conducted	CBI registered an FIR and raided former UPPSC examination controller Prabhunath after an investigation revealed that candidates who failed the Hindi shorthand test were illegally passed and appointed as Additional Private Secretaries in the 2010 examination.
June 6, 2010	RRB Mumbai 2010 recruitment exam (Assistant Loco Pilot / Assistant Station Master)	Railway Recruitment Board (RRB), Mumbai	All India	Arrests/FIR, Probe (CBI/SIT)	CBI registered a case on 15 June 2010 over the leak of question papers for recruitment to 1,936 assistant loco pilot/station master posts (exam scheduled 6 June 2010); in January 2024 a CBI special court convicted 10, including the former RRB-Mumbai chairman, to five years of rigorous imprisonment, with four acquitted.
September 26, 2010	Indian Navy Western Naval Command LDC & Stenographer Recruitment Examination 2010	Indian Navy	All India	Arrests/FIR, Probe (CBI), Conviction	Question paper for the Western Naval Command's lower division clerk exam was leaked by INS Angre commander and recruitment board president Ramesh Chand Saini, who had exclusive custody of it and carried it on a pen drive to Pune. A CBI raid on the eve of the exam at United Lodge near Crawford Market, where candidates had gathered, recovered papers the court found identical to those Saini had set. A special CBI court convicted Saini and coaching centre proprietor Rambir Singh Rawat of conspiracy and criminal misconduct in September 2025, sentencing both to three years' rigorous imprisonment and a ₹50,000 fine; four co-accused were acquitted.
February 27, 2011	LIC Assistant Administrative Officer (AAO) Recruitment Exam 2011	Life Insurance Corporation of India (LIC)	Delhi	Arrests/FIR, Cancelled, Retest, Probe (Police)	Delhi Police Crime Branch and Hyderabad Police busted an inter-state syndicate that procured leaked question papers from an EdCIL printing press and sold them to candidates for up to ₹5–7 lakh each. Life Insurance Corporation of India subsequently cancelled the nationwide examination taken by over 1.65 lakh candidates across 150 test centers.
May 1, 2011	AIEEE (All India Engineering Entrance Examination) 2011	Central Board of Secondary Education (CBSE)	All India	Retest, Arrests/FIR	Question paper was leaked in Uttar Pradesh and sold for ₹6 lakh; CBSE postponed the 1 May 2011 exam by 2.5 to 3 hours, distributing alternate question papers for about 12 lakh candidates across 1,600 centres, and held a special re-test on 8 May 2011 for candidates who also appeared in the AFMC exam.
June 19, 2011	Chhattisgarh Pre-Medical Test (CG-PMT) 2011	Chhattisgarh Professional Examination Board (CGPEB)	Chhattisgarh	Exam cancelled, Arrests/FIR	CG-PMT scrapped after a crime-branch raid at a Takhatpur rest house (Bilaspur) found about 80 aspirants being tutored from the leaked paper; 12 held, including some dental/medical students. Second cancellation within weeks (earlier May sitting also deferred). About 20,000 registered.
November 13, 2011	Uttar Pradesh Teacher Eligibility Test (UPTET) 2011	UP Secondary Education Board / Directorate of Education	Uttar Pradesh	Arrests/FIR, Probe (SIT)	TET scam involved bribery and manipulation of answer sheets where candidates were charged large sums; UP Secondary Education Board Director Sanjay Mohan and associates were arrested in Feb 2012 by UP Police following raids seizing cash and documents.
December 2011	Vyapam Contract Teacher Eligibility Test (Samvida Shala Shikshak Patrata Pariksha Varg-3) 2011	Madhya Pradesh Professional Examination Board (Vyapam)	Madhya Pradesh	Arrests/FIR, Probe (CBI/SIT)	CBI filed a chargesheet naming 95 accused, including former minister Laxmikant Sharma, his OSD, and Vyapam officials Pankaj Trivedi and Nitin Mohindra, for manipulating roll numbers and marks to favor candidates in the 2011 Samvida Shala Shikshak Grade-3 (Contract Teacher) exam.
December 15, 2011	KPSC Gazetted Probationers Examination 2011 (Group-A & Group-B)	Karnataka Public Service Commission	Karnataka	Recruitment list scrapped, Probe (CID), Chargesheet	Criminal Investigation Department (CID) uncovered extensive corruption and mark tampering for 362 Group-A and Group-B posts (162 Group-A and 200 Group-B); CID filed a 10,521-page chargesheet against six officials including former KPSC chairman Gonal Manjappa, leading the government to scrap the 2011 recruitment list.
January 1, 2012	MPPSC State Service Examination 2012	Madhya Pradesh Public Service Commission (MPPSC)	Madhya Pradesh	Probe (Delhi Police Crime Branch / STF), Interviews put on hold, Arrests/FIR	Delhi Police Crime Branch busted an interstate paper leak gang that confessed to leaking question papers of the 2012 MPPSC State Service examination; MPPSC suspended interview rounds and selection procedures pending the criminal investigation.
January 8, 2012	AIIMS Post-Graduate (MD/MS) Entrance Examination 2012	All India Institute of Medical Sciences (AIIMS)	All India	Arrests/FIR	Extensive cash-for-jobs recruitment scam in the Assam Public Service Commission where candidates paid bribes to secure selection as ADO and civil service officers in the 2013 and 2014 combined competitive examinations; in July 2024, a Gauhati special court convicted former APSC Chairman Rakesh Paul and 33 others, while 10 were acquitted.
March 11, 2012	MP Pre-PG (Post-Graduate Medical) Test 2012	Madhya Pradesh Professional Examination Board (Vyapam)	Madhya Pradesh	Arrests/FIR, Probe (CBI/SIT)	MP STF and CBI investigations revealed that model answer keys were leaked to candidates in the MP Pre-PG 2012 medical test, where touts and private medical college figures paid large bribes to Vyapam racketeers to ensure high ranks for favored candidates.
May 27, 2012	State Bank of India Assistants Grade Recruitment Examination 2012	State Bank of India (SBI)	Delhi	Arrests/FIR	Delhi Police Crime Branch arrested three members of an inter-state paper leak syndicate, including kingpin Ravi Atri, in Outer Delhi hours before the exam. The gang had compromised the question paper and deployed high-tech Bluetooth earpieces and mobile transmitters to transmit solved answers to candidates.
June 1, 2012	Jammu & Kashmir Common Entrance Test (JKCET) 2012 – medical (MBBS/BDS)	J&K Board of Professional Entrance Examinations (BOPEE)	Jammu and Kashmir	Arrests/FIR, Probe	Medical entrance papers with answer keys were sold ahead of the exam; scam surfaced in 2013 (FIR 24/2013), Crime Branch arrested the then BOPEE chairman (November 2013) and others, 24 beneficiaries identified, 11 candidates later convicted (1 year each). Exam mid-2012; day approximate.
June 1, 2012	MP Pre-Medical Test (PMT) (Vyapam Scam) 2012	Madhya Pradesh Professional Examination Board (Vyapam)	Madhya Pradesh	Probe (CBI/STF), Arrests/FIR	CBI filed a chargesheet naming 592 persons in connection with the Pre-Medical Test (PMT) 2012 scam conducted by MPPEB (Vyapam), including former Vyapam officials Pankaj Trivedi and Nitin Mohindra, solvers, middlemen, and chairmen of four private medical colleges.
July 29, 2012	PSPCL Assistant Engineer & Junior Engineer Recruitment Examination 2012	Punjab State Power Corporation Limited (PSPCL)	Punjab	Exam cancelled, Probe (DGP Vigilance), Arrests/FIR	Recruitment examination for 385 AE and 330 JE posts held on 29 July 2012 leaked via MMS from exam centres and candidates received answers via SMS. Following two inquiry reports by the DGP Vigilance confirming systemic leakage, the PSPCL Board of Management scrapped the entire selection process on 6 February 2013 and ordered FIRs registered.
August 12, 2012	MP Transport Constable Recruitment Test 2012	Madhya Pradesh Professional Examination Board (Vyapam)	Madhya Pradesh	Probe (CBI/STF), Arrests/FIR	CBI registered an FIR naming former minister Laxmikant Sharma, his aide O P Shukla, and Vyapam officials for criminal conspiracy and cheating in the Transport Constable Recruitment Examination 2012 conducted by MPPEB.
August 12, 2012	TNPSC Combined Subordinate Services Examination-I (Group-II) 2012	Tamil Nadu Public Service Commission	Tamil Nadu	Arrests/FIR, Probe (CB-CID)	Question paper for the TNPSC Group-II examination was leaked via email on the morning of the exam and circulated to candidates in Namakkal and Dharmapuri; CB-CID arrested key brokers and government commercial tax officials involved in the transaction.
September 30, 2012	Vyapam Police Constable Recruitment Examination 2012	Madhya Pradesh Professional Examination Board (Vyapam)	Madhya Pradesh	Arrests/FIR, Probe (CBI/SIT)	Candidates arranged impersonators to sit the 30 September 2012 constable exam; special CBI court sentenced 11 (six candidates, five impersonators) to seven years of rigorous imprisonment each (May 2024).
October 7, 2012	MP Food Inspector Selection Test 2012	Madhya Pradesh Professional Examination Board (Vyapam)	Madhya Pradesh	Probe (CBI/STF), Arrests/FIR	CBI registered an FIR against former Vyapam Controller of Examinations Pankaj Trivedi and 37 others in connection with alleged cheating and illegalities in the Food Inspector Selection Test 2012 conducted by MPPEB.
April 21, 2013	SSC Combined Graduate Level (CGL) Examination 2013	Staff Selection Commission (SSC)	All India	Exam cancelled, Retest, Arrests/FIR, CAT Order	Question papers for Tier-I and Tier-II sittings in April 2013 (recruiting Income Tax Inspectors, CBI SIs, Excise Inspectors) leaked via laptops, mobile phones, data cards, and pen drives; 14 people including a policeman were arrested by Delhi Police. On 26 April 2014, the Central Administrative Tribunal (CAT bench of Raj Vir Sharma and Shekhar Agarwal) scrapped the examination and ordered a fresh test for all candidates.
July 7, 2013	MP Pre-Medical Test (PMT) 2013	Madhya Pradesh Professional Examination Board (Vyapam)	Madhya Pradesh	Arrests/FIR, Probe (CBI/SIT)	An Indore CBI court sentenced five accused to five years' rigorous imprisonment in May 2023 for rigging the 2013 Pre-Medical Test (PMT) conducted by Vyapam, where roll numbers and seating arrangements were manipulated to place solvers next to candidate beneficiaries.
September 15, 2013	Vyapam Police Constable Recruitment Examination 2013	Madhya Pradesh Professional Examination Board (Vyapam)	Madhya Pradesh	Arrests/FIR, Probe (CBI/SIT)	Impersonation and forgery in the 2013 constable exam; CBI court convicted 31 (including 12 imposters and seven middlemen), sentencing one to 10 years and 30 to seven years of rigorous imprisonment (November 2019).
October 26, 2013	RAS (Rajasthan Administrative Service) Preliminary Examination 2013	Rajasthan Public Service Commission (RPSC)	Rajasthan	Exam cancelled, Arrests/FIR, Probe (SIT)	RAS-2013 prelims (26 October 2013) scrapped after the Rajasthan Police SOG found about 20 of the top 50 selected candidates (including the mastermind's wife) had accessed the leaked paper; arrests followed. Date is the exam/leak date.
May 4, 2014	APSC Combined Competitive & Agricultural Development Officer (Cash-for-Jobs Scam)	Assam Public Service Commission (APSC)	Assam	Arrests/FIR, Probe (CBI/SIT)	Extensive cash-for-jobs recruitment scam in the Assam Public Service Commission where candidates paid bribes to secure selection as ADO and civil service officers in the 2013 and 2014 combined competitive examinations; in July 2024, a Gauhati special court convicted former APSC Chairman Rakesh Paul and 33 others, while 10 were acquitted.
May 18, 2014	Ayurvedic Medical Officers Recruitment Examination 2014	Madhya Pradesh Public Service Commission (MPPSC)	Madhya Pradesh	Exam cancelled, Arrests/FIR, Probe (STF)	MPPSC cancelled the recruitment examination conducted on 18 May 2014 for filling 722 posts of Ayurvedic medical officers after an STF investigation confirmed the question paper was leaked prior to the exam from an interstate paper leak gang.
June 22, 2014	Uttar Pradesh Combined Pre-Medical Test (UPCPMT/UP-CPMT) 2014	King George’s Medical University (KGMU), Lucknow	Uttar Pradesh	Exam cancelled, Retest, Arrests/FIR, Probe (STF)	Uttar Pradesh Combined Pre-Medical Test (UPCPMT-2014) was cancelled across all centres after boxes containing question papers kept at a bank vault in Ghaziabad were found tampered with before the exam; over 1 lakh candidates were affected.
June 29, 2014	DSSSB Head Clerk (Grade II DASS, Post Code 90/09) Recruitment, Tier-I	Delhi Subordinate Services Selection Board (DSSSB)	Delhi	Exam cancelled, Probe	Complaints of question paper leakage, mass copying and impersonation across both tiers led the Delhi government to cancel the entire Head Clerk selection process; the Supreme Court upheld the cancellation in March 2021, holding that recruitment to public services must command public confidence.
June 29, 2014	Railway Recruitment Board Assistant Loco Pilot (ALP) Exam 2014	Railway Recruitment Control Board	Karnataka	Arrests/FIR, Probe (CBI/STF)	DSSSB examination for recruitment of primary teachers in MCD schools held on 29 October 2017 was cancelled by Lt. Governor Anil Baijal after a Delhi Police report and investigation by the Crime Branch confirmed cheating and question paper leak.
October 11, 2014	West Bengal Primary Teacher Eligibility Test (WB TET) 2014	West Bengal Board of Primary Education (WBBPE)	West Bengal	Arrests/FIR, Probe (CBI/ED), Court-ordered cancellations	Calcutta High Court directed the CBI in July 2024 to hand over investigation data regarding large-scale irregularities in the 2014 West Bengal Primary Teacher Eligibility Test (TET) to the West Bengal Board of Primary Education (WBBPE) to process eligible petitioner certificates.
February 14, 2015	Chandigarh JBT and TGT Teacher Recruitment Examination 2015	Chandigarh Education Department	Chandigarh	Arrests/FIR, Conviction, Dismissals	Question papers for recruitment of 1,150 Junior Basic Training (JBT) and Trained Graduate Teacher (TGT) posts were leaked from a printing press in Delhi; Chandigarh Police filed a 1,000-page chargesheet against key kingpins Mithilesh Pandey (alias Guruji) and 42 recruited teachers were subsequently dismissed.
March 29, 2015	UPPCS Preliminary Examination 2015	Uttar Pradesh Public Service Commission (UPPSC)	Uttar Pradesh	Exam cancelled, Arrests/FIR	Question paper was photographed about an hour before the test at a Lucknow centre and circulated on WhatsApp; the Chief Minister ordered cancellation and three people were arrested.
May 3, 2015	AIPMT 2015 (All India Pre-Medical Test)	Central Board of Secondary Education (CBSE)	All India	Exam cancelled, Retest, Arrests/FIR	Bluetooth/micro-SIM answer-key racket intercepted by Haryana Police in Rohtak; Supreme Court cancelled the 3 May exam on 15 June 2015 and ordered a retest, held 25 July 2015. Leak originated in Haryana.
October 4, 2015	Primary Teacher (PRT) and PRT (Music) recruitment examination	Kendriya Vidyalaya Sangathan (KVS)	All India	Exam cancelled, Arrests/FIR	KVS called off the written test on the day it was held after a soft copy of the PRT question paper circulated on WhatsApp; police in Rewari, Haryana busted the gang behind the leak, arrested 13 people and registered an FIR.
November 8, 2015	Punjab Department of Local Government Recruitment Examinations (Junior Engineers & SDEs) 2015	Department of Local Government, Punjab	Punjab	Exam cancelled, Retest, Arrests/FIR, Probe (Vigilance Bureau)	Question papers for over 600 posts including Junior Engineers and Sub-Divisional Engineers were leaked from a Delhi printing press by employee Shiv Bahadur Singh and sold by mastermind Sanjay Srivastava ("Guruji") to candidates for ₹10–40 lakh each; the Punjab Vigilance Bureau registered an FIR, arrested the masterminds and over 30 beneficiaries, and the government cancelled the recruitment process.
November 14, 2015	HTET Level-3 (Haryana Teacher Eligibility Test)	Board of School Education Haryana (HBSE)	Haryana	Exam cancelled, Arrests/FIR	Haryana Teacher Eligibility Test Level-3 exam held in November 2015 was cancelled after the question paper was leaked and circulated prior to the test; police arrested key members of a solver gang.
March 6, 2016	Village Panchayat Development Officer (VPDO/VDO) recruitment exam	Uttarakhand Subordinate Services Selection Commission (UKSSSC)	Uttarakhand	Exam cancelled, Probe (ED/PMLA), Arrests/FIR	Uttarakhand Police STF arrested three top officials, including former UKSSSC chairman R.B.S. Rawat, secretary Manohar Kanyal, and former examination controller R.S. Pokharia, in connection with question paper leak and answer sheet manipulation in the 2016 Village Panchayat Development Officer (VPDO) recruitment examination.
March 20, 2016	SSC CPO (Sub-Inspector/Assistant Sub-Inspector) Paper-I 2016	Staff Selection Commission (SSC)	All India	Exam cancelled, Retest, Probe (Crime Branch)	A page of the question paper was posted on a coaching-centre proprietor's Facebook page about five hours before the test; the commission cancelled the written examination and re-held it on 5 June 2016, and the Delhi Police Crime Branch opened an enquiry.
May 1, 2016	NEET-UG 2016 (Phase II)	Central Board of Secondary Education (CBSE)	All India	None reported	Inter-state leak allegations around the 2016 NEET Phase II surfaced but were not confirmed nationwide; no nationwide retest ordered. Month approximate (1st used).
July 9, 2016	TS EAMCET-II (Medical Entrance) 2016	Jawaharlal Nehru Technological University, Hyderabad (JNTUH)	Telangana	Exam cancelled, Retest, Arrests/FIR, Probe (CID)	Telangana Government cancelled the EAMCET-II medical entrance examination on 2 August 2016 after a CID inquiry confirmed question papers were leaked from a printing press in Delhi; CID arrested over 20 brokers and key conspirators involved in coaching students with leaked papers, and a re-exam was ordered for affected candidates.
September 4, 2016	Manipur Civil Services Combined Competitive (Main) Examination (MCSCCE) 2016	Manipur Public Service Commission (MPSC)	Manipur	Exam quashed, Retest, Probe (CBI), Arrests/FIR	The Manipur High Court quashed the MCSCCE 2016 Main examination and set aside the appointment of 82 candidates across civil and police services after a judicial inquiry panel found widespread irregularities including marks manipulation, missing examiner signatures, and lack of standardized evaluation; the Supreme Court upheld the quashing and in February 2020 the CBI registered an FIR against MPSC officials.
November 27, 2016	State Level Selection Test (SLST) 2016 teacher & Group C/D recruitment	West Bengal School Service Commission (WBSSC)	West Bengal	Exam cancelled, Probe (CBI/SIT)	Calcutta High Court declared all appointments null and void in the selection of candidates for secondary and higher secondary school teacher and Group C/D posts conducted through the 2016 State Level Selection Test (SLST), citing widespread manipulation and ordering fresh recruitment.
November 27, 2016	UPPSC Review Officer / Assistant Review Officer (RO/ARO) Preliminary Exam 2016	Uttar Pradesh Public Service Commission (UPPSC)	Uttar Pradesh	Exam cancelled, Retest, Arrests/FIR, Probe (CBCID/STF)	UPPSC cancelled the 2016 Review Officer/Assistant Review Officer (RO/ARO) preliminary examination following allegations and an investigation into question paper leakage on WhatsApp; the commission ordered a fresh preliminary re-examination.
February 5, 2017	BSSC 1st Inter-Level Combined (Clerical-grade) Competitive Exam	Bihar Staff Selection Commission (BSSC)	Bihar	Exam cancelled, Arrests/FIR, Probe (SIT)	The clerical-grade recruitment paper was leaked on WhatsApp; the state cancelled the exam and an SIT arrested the BSSC chairman (a senior IAS officer) along with several relatives and others, around 30 people in total.
February 26, 2017	Indian Army recruitment examination (CEE) 2017	Indian Army	Maharashtra and Goa	Exam cancelled in zone, Arrests/FIR, Probe (CBI/Police)	Thane Crime Branch and Army Intelligence conducted midnight raids busting an interstate question paper leak racket across Maharashtra and Goa, leading to the nationwide cancellation of the Army recruitment examination (CEE) scheduled for 26 February 2017; 18 persons were arrested.
April 30, 2017	SSC Multi-Tasking Staff (MTS Non-Technical) Examination 2016 (Paper-I)	Staff Selection Commission (SSC)	All India	Exam cancelled, Retest, Arrests/FIR	The afternoon shift of Paper-I held on 30 April 2017 was cancelled after images of the question paper and answer key circulated on social media before the examination; SSC subsequently cancelled the entire offline examination cycle and transitioned MTS to computer-based testing (CBT).
April 30, 2017	Staff Selection Commission Multi-Tasking Staff (Non-Technical) Examination 2017	Staff Selection Commission (SSC)	All India	Exam cancelled, Retest, Arrests/FIR, Probe (Crime Branch)	The Staff Selection Commission cancelled the offline Multi-Tasking Staff (MTS) Non-Technical examination (held on 30 April and 14 May 2017) across the country after question papers and answer keys leaked on social media in Delhi and Patna; SSC subsequently scrapped the pen-and-paper mode and rescheduled the entire exam in Computer Based Examination (CBE) mode for millions of aspirants.
May 7, 2017	NEET-UG 2017	Central Board of Secondary Education (CBSE)	All India	Arrests/FIR	Central Board of Secondary Education conducted NEET-UG 2017 across 1,921 centres on 7 May 2017; police in Patna and Jaipur arrested multiple members of solver gangs caught with leaked question papers and wireless Bluetooth equipment.
July 16, 2017	HCS (Judicial Branch) Preliminary Examination 2017	Punjab & Haryana High Court	Haryana	Exam cancelled, Arrests/FIR, Probe	A High Court committee found the paper was leaked and the prelims (109 judicial posts) were scrapped; the then Registrar (Recruitment) and two others were later convicted, two getting five-year jail terms in 2024.
July 24, 2017	UP Police Inspector (Sub-Inspector/Inspector) Online Recruitment Test 2017	Uttar Pradesh Police Recruitment and Promotion Board (UPPRPB)	Uttar Pradesh	Exam cancelled, Probe (STF)	Following evidence of online question paper leakage and cyber hacking of the examination portal, the Uttar Pradesh Police recruitment board cancelled the online examination for sub-inspectors held between 7 and 25 July 2017, and ordered an STF probe.
August 6, 2017	TNPSC Group II-A Services Examination 2017	Tamil Nadu Public Service Commission (TNPSC)	Tamil Nadu	Arrests/FIR, Probe (CB-CID)	CB-CID uncovered that candidates appearing at Rameswaram and Keelakarai centres used pens with disappearing ink, allowing racketeers and TNPSC staff to intercept and substitute answer sheets with correct answers inside transport vehicles en route to Chennai; prime accused S. Jayakumar and over 40 candidates, agents, and staff were arrested.
September 16, 2017	TRB Polytechnic Lecturer Recruitment Exam 2017	Teachers Recruitment Board, Tamil Nadu (TRB)	Tamil Nadu	Results quashed, Fresh exam, CB-CID & ED probe	OMR answer sheets of nearly 200 candidates were tampered with inside TRB premises to fraudulently inflate marks for polytechnic lecturer posts; selection list was quashed.
October 29, 2017	DSSSB Primary Teacher (PRT) Examination (Post Code 16/17) 2017	Delhi Subordinate Services Selection Board (DSSSB)	Delhi	Exam cancelled, Retest, Arrests/FIR	DSSSB examination for recruitment of primary teachers in MCD schools held on 29 October 2017 was cancelled by Lt. Governor Anil Baijal after a Delhi Police report and investigation by the Crime Branch confirmed cheating and question paper leak.
October 29, 2017	DSSSB Primary Teacher (PRT) Recruitment Examination (Post Code 16/17 & 01/13) 2017	Delhi Subordinate Services Selection Board (DSSSB)	Delhi	Exam cancelled, Retest, Arrests/FIR, Probe (Crime Branch)	The 29 October 2017 recruitment examination for 4,366 primary school teacher posts (for which over 1 lakh candidates appeared) was cancelled by Delhi Lt Governor Anil Baijal following a Crime Branch investigation confirming question papers were leaked on WhatsApp and solved electronically; police arrested multiple individuals including candidates and paper handlers.
February 21, 2018	SSC CGL 2017 Tier-II	Staff Selection Commission (SSC)	All India	Arrests/FIR, Probe (CBI/SIT)	Answer key of the 21 February 2018 Tier-II paper went viral before the exam start time; nationwide candidate protests followed. CBI booked 17 (10 Sify Technologies employees who ran exam centres and seven candidates); the Supreme Court later refused to scrap the exam.
March 7, 2018	Rajasthan Police Constable Recruitment Online Examination 2018	Rajasthan Police Recruitment & Promotion Board	Rajasthan	Cancelled & Retest	The Rajasthan Police Recruitment Board cancelled the online recruitment examination for constable posts held in March 2018 after an inter-state cyber gang leaked question papers and cheated using remote access software across multiple test centers.
March 31, 2018	UPPCL Junior Engineer / Technician online recruitment exams 2018	Uttar Pradesh Power Corporation Ltd (UPPCL)	Uttar Pradesh	Exam cancelled, Probe (SIT/STF)	UPPCL nullified its 2018 online recruitment exams after the STF detected irregularities/paper leak; the conducting private agency was blacklisted and commission officials were suspended.
May 26, 2018	Kerala PSC University Assistant & Civil Police Officer Examination Scam 2018	Kerala Public Service Commission (KPSC)	Kerala	Life ban, Rank list cancelled, Crime Branch arrests	Recruitment examination conducted by Kerala PSC saw systematic electronic cheating where SFI college union leaders received question paper photos via smartwatches and sent answer keys back via SMS with help from police and external accomplices; Kerala PSC debarred the accused candidates for life and Crime Branch arrested six persons including police officer Gokul.
June 18, 2018	UP Police Constable Recruitment Examination 2018 (2nd Shift)	Uttar Pradesh Police Recruitment and Promotion Board (UPPRPB)	Uttar Pradesh	Cancelled & Retest	UP Police Recruitment & Promotion Board cancelled the second-shift written examinations held on 18 and 19 June 2018 across 56 examination centers after compromised question paper sets were distributed. A fresh re-examination was ordered for affected candidates.
June 29, 2018	UPPSC Assistant Teacher (LT Grade) Recruitment Examination 2018	Uttar Pradesh Public Service Commission (UPPSC)	Uttar Pradesh	STF Arrests & Prosecution	UP STF arrested UPPSC Controller of Examinations Anju Lata Katiyar and printing press owner Kaushik Kar after question papers for two subjects of the LT Grade Assistant Teacher examination (conducted in 2018) were leaked prior to the test. Kar printed 50 extra papers and paid bribes for the printing contract.
July 29, 2018	Gujarat Teacher Aptitude Test (TAT) 2018	State Examination Board, Gujarat (SEB)	Gujarat	Exam cancelled, Retest ordered, Arrests/FIR	Teacher Aptitude Test taken by ~1.47 lakh candidates was cancelled by Gujarat State Examination Board after the question paper was leaked and circulated on social media prior to the test.
September 2, 2018	UPSSSC Tubewell Operator (Nalkoop Chalak) Recruitment Exam	Uttar Pradesh Subordinate Services Selection Commission (UPSSSC)	Uttar Pradesh	Exam cancelled, Arrests/FIR	UPSSSC Tubewell Operator recruitment examination scheduled for 2 September 2018 was postponed after the Hindi question paper leaked on social media; the Uttar Pradesh STF arrested 11 accused, including mastermind Sachin, across Meerut and seized ₹15 lakh cash.
October 8, 2018	Uttar Pradesh Basic Training Certificate (BTC) 4th Semester Examination 2018	Examination Regulatory Authority (ERA), Uttar Pradesh	Uttar Pradesh	Exam cancelled, Retest, Arrests/FIR, Probe (STF)	Examination for the 4th semester of BTC 2015 batch scheduled across Uttar Pradesh was cancelled by the state government after question papers were leaked on WhatsApp from exam centres in Kaushambi and Prayagraj; UP Police Special Task Force (STF) arrested printing press owners and coaching operators.
December 2, 2018	Gujarat Lokrakshak Dal (LRD) Police Constable Recruitment Examination 2018	Lokrakshak Recruitment Board (LRRB), Gujarat Police	Gujarat	Exam cancelled, Retest, Arrests/FIR	Written exam for 9,713 police constable posts was cancelled hours before start for over 8.75 lakh candidates across 2,440 centres after an answer key matching the set paper was found circulating; Gujarat Police and ATS arrested over 30 people including a police sub-inspector and coaching operators, and a re-exam was conducted on 6 January 2019.
December 22, 2018	UPSSSC Village Development Officer (VDO / Gram Panchayat Adhikari) Exam 2018	Uttar Pradesh Subordinate Services Selection Commission (UPSSSC)	Uttar Pradesh	Exam cancelled, Retest, Probe (SIT/EOW), Arrests/FIR	UPSSSC cancelled the Village Development Officer (Gram Panchayat Adhikari / Samaj Kalyan Paryavekshak) recruitment examination held on 22–23 December 2018 following an SIT inquiry that confirmed widespread OMR sheet tampering and malpractices across examination centres.
January 16, 2019	Odisha Teacher Eligibility Test (OTET) 2018/2019	Board of Secondary Education, Odisha (BSE)	Odisha	Exam cancelled, Retest, Probe (Crime Branch)	Odisha Teacher Eligibility Test (OTET) scheduled on 16 January 2019 across 250 test centres for over 1.11 lakh candidates was cancelled by Board of Secondary Education (BSE) president Jahan Ara Begum after question paper images went viral on social media; the case was handed over to the Crime Branch.
August 28, 2019	Railway Recruitment Board Junior Engineer (JE) Stage-2 CBT Exam 2019	Railway Recruitment Control Board	Maharashtra	Arrests/FIR	Thane Kasarvadavali Police registered an FIR against a candidate and exam center operators after discovering that a remote access device was connected to a computer terminal at Career Heights center in Thane to leak screenshots of the RRB JE Stage-2 CBT question paper onto social media during the exam.
September 1, 2019	TNPSC Combined Civil Services Examination-IV (Group 4) 2019	Tamil Nadu Public Service Commission (TNPSC)	Tamil Nadu	Arrests/FIR, Probe (CB-CID/CBI)	CB-CID uncovered a major malpractice syndicate in the 1 September 2019 Group-IV examination where 99 top-ranking candidates at Rameswaram and Keelakarai centres used vanishing ink pens on OMR sheets, which were subsequently filled in with correct answers by accomplices during transport to Chennai; 118 individuals were arrested including 98 candidates, 2 TNPSC staff, and a van driver, and the Madras High Court ordered a CBI probe in December 2021.
November 17, 2019	GSSSB Binsachivalay Clerk and Office Assistant Recruitment Exam 2019	Gujarat Subordinate Services Selection Board (GSSSB)	Gujarat	Exam cancelled	Examination conducted on 17 November 2019 by GSSSB for 3,910 non-secretariat clerk and office assistant posts (taken by 6 lakh candidates) was cancelled on 16 December 2019 following mass student protests in Gandhinagar and an SIT investigation confirming paper leakage, mobile phone usage, and copying; four FIRs were lodged.
December 5, 2019	HSSC ITI Instructor Exam 2019	Haryana Staff Selection Commission (HSSC)	Haryana	Arrests/FIR, SIT formed	Chandigarh Police raided a computer lab and arrested the lab manager while detaining 11 candidate aspirants who had gathered to receive leaked HSSC online question papers and answers sent via mobile phones.
December 29, 2019	Librarian Grade III recruitment exam	Rajasthan Staff Selection Board (RSMSSB)	Rajasthan	Exam cancelled, Arrests/FIR	Question paper and answer key circulated on WhatsApp roughly two hours before the exam; board cancelled it and ordered a re-test. About six persons were arrested.
January 16, 2020	Maharashtra Teacher Eligibility Test (MAHA-TET) 2019–20	Maharashtra State Council of Examinations (MSCE)	Maharashtra	MSCE Commissioner arrested, 7,800 candidates banned	Pune Police Cyber Crime Cell uncovered widespread OMR sheet and marks manipulation in MAHA-TET 2019–20, arresting former MSCE commissioners Sukhdev Dere and Tukaram Supe along with exam vendor GA Software directors; police seized ₹2.5 crore in cash and gold from Supe.
January 28, 2020	Bihar State Teacher Eligibility Test (STET) 2019	Bihar School Examination Board (BSEB)	Bihar	Exam cancelled, Online retest, Inquiry committee	BSEB cancelled Bihar STET 2019 held on 28 January 2020 across 317 centres after a four-member committee headed by Chief Vigilance Officer Nilkamal confirmed question paper leakage and circulation via mobile phones.
February 2, 2020	APSSB Lower Division Clerk (LDC) & Junior Secretariat Assistant (JSA) Recruitment Examination 2020	Arunachal Pradesh Staff Selection Board (APSSB)	Arunachal Pradesh	Exam cancelled, Retest, Arrests/FIR, Probe (SIC)	The Arunachal Pradesh Staff Selection Board cancelled the 2 February 2020 recruitment examination for LDC, JSA, and other posts after blank OMR answer sheets were shortlisted for skill tests; the state police Special Investigation Cell (SIC) registered an FIR, arrested APSSB undersecretary Kapter Ringu and touts, and chargesheeted 19 persons in November 2020.
September 20, 2020	Assam Police Sub-Inspector (UB) Recruitment Written Examination 2020	State Level Police Recruitment Board (SLPRB), Assam	Assam	Exam cancelled, Retest, Arrests/FIR, CID investigation	Question paper for 597 Sub-Inspector (Unarmed Branch) posts leaked on social media minutes after the exam commenced on 20 September 2020 for 66,000 candidates across 154 centres; SLPRB Chairman Pradeep Kumar resigned, exam was cancelled immediately, and CID arrested over 40 accused including retired DIG PK Dutta and SP Kumar Sanjit Krishna.
October 11, 2020	Medical Officer (Dental) recruitment test	Baba Farid University of Health Sciences (BFUHS)	Punjab	Exam cancelled, Retest	Question paper for the dental officer post went viral on social media about 80 minutes into the test; BFUHS traced the leak to one centre, withheld the dental result and re-conducted only the dental paper (general MO and pharmacist papers stood); retest declared 1,957 of about 3,000 eligible for 35 posts.
December 1, 2020	Gujarat DISCOMs Vidyut Sahayak Online Exam 2020	Gujarat Urja Vikas Nigam Limited (GUVNL)	Gujarat	Crime Branch probe, Arrests/FIR	Surat Crime Branch busted an online examination rigging syndicate in the Vidyut Sahayak (JE Civil) test held from December 2020 to January 2021 for 2,156 candidates across Gujarat DISCOMs, where screen splitter software at eight testing centres allowed external solvers to attempt papers using dual monitors.
December 6, 2020	Junior Engineer (JEN) recruitment exam	Rajasthan Staff Selection Board (RSMSSB)	Rajasthan	Exam cancelled, Arrests/FIR, Retest	Paper leaked from a Jaipur government school ahead of the test; board cancelled the exam. Around 24 people were arrested; the September 2021 re-test was also found compromised and an assistant engineer who used the leaked re-test paper was later arrested.
December 14, 2020	APPSC Group-I Mains Examination (Notification No. 27/2018)	Andhra Pradesh Public Service Commission (APPSC)	Andhra Pradesh	Selection list quashed by High Court, Probe (SIT)	Widespread procedural violations and answer-script manipulation occurred during digital and manual evaluation of Group-I Mains answer scripts; forensic (CFSL) and CID SIT investigation confirmed over 95% of selected candidates' answer sheets had whitener, manual alterations, or unauthorized evaluation by daily-wage workers at Haailand Resorts, leading the Andhra Pradesh High Court to cancel the selection list.
January 3, 2021	Railway GDCE 2021 (General Departmental Competitive Exam, RRC Mumbai)	Railway Recruitment Cell (Western Railway)	All India	Arrests/FIR, Probe (CBI/SIT)	Candidates allegedly supplied papers with answers before the 3 January 2021 computer-based test via WhatsApp for payment; CBI registered a case (January 2024) against exam agency Aptech Ltd and named 15 people including 10 railway officials and a CRPF constable.
January 9, 2021	HSSC Gram Sachiv (Panchayat Secretary) exam	Haryana Staff Selection Commission (HSSC)	Haryana	Exam cancelled, Arrests/FIR	Exams held 9–10 January for 697 posts were cancelled after an answer-key and impersonation racket surfaced; 18 suspects arrested across two centres.
January 10, 2021	Constable (Tradesmen) recruitment written examination	Indo-Tibetan Border Police (ITBP)	All India	Arrests/FIR	The question paper reached ITBP officers on WhatsApp before the test taken by 46,174 candidates at 81 centres in 13 cities; Delhi Police later arrested five people, among them three directors of the private agency that conducted the exam, a consultant and a printer.
January 24, 2021	First Division Assistant (FDA) Recruitment Examination 2021	Karnataka Public Service Commission (KPSC)	Karnataka	Exam postponed, Retest, Arrests/FIR	Bengaluru Central Crime Branch (CCB) police busted a question paper leak racket on the eve of the First Division Assistant (FDA) examination, seizing leaked question papers and arresting over a dozen accused; KPSC postponed the exam scheduled for 24 January 2021.
January 31, 2021	Central Teacher Eligibility Test (CTET) January 2021	Central Board of Secondary Education (CBSE)	All India (Agra)	Arrests/FIR, Probe	Solved question papers for the Central Teacher Eligibility Test (CTET) were leaked on social media and WhatsApp groups shortly before the exam on 31 January 2021; Uttar Pradesh Police and Agra police arrested five persons including a coaching institute director caught with leaked question papers and answer keys, while three impersonators were arrested in Mainpuri.
January 31, 2021	West Bengal Primary Teacher Eligibility Test (WB Primary TET) 2017	West Bengal Board of Primary Education (WBBPE)	West Bengal	Arrests/FIR, Police investigation	Question paper images leaked on WhatsApp groups shortly after commencement of the WB Primary TET exam across centres in Murshidabad and Malda, leading to police arrests of candidates and touts.
February 10, 2021	MPPEB Group-1 & Group-5 Recruitment Exams 2021	Madhya Pradesh Employees Selection Board (MPESB)	Madhya Pradesh	Exams cancelled, Technical audit, Vendor blacklisted	A technical audit by MPSEDC proved online question papers for RAEO, SADO, and Nursing recruitment tests were downloaded unauthorizedly a day before the test; MP government cancelled all three exams and blacklisted vendor NSEIT.
February 28, 2021	Indian Army Soldier General Duty Common Entrance Examination (CEE) 2021	Indian Army	All India	Exam cancelled, Arrests/FIR	Nationwide Common Entrance Examination scheduled for 28 February 2021 across 40 centres for recruitment of soldiers (GD) was cancelled by the Indian Army after Pune Police Crime Branch and Southern Command Military Intelligence busted a paper leak syndicate operating out of Pune and Goa, seizing leaked question papers matching the original; several serving and retired defence personnel including a Major were arrested.
July 1, 2021	Forest Guard, Secretariat Security Guard and an earlier graduate-level exam (2021)	Uttarakhand Subordinate Services Selection Commission (UKSSSC)	Uttarakhand	Exam cancelled, Retest	Three UKSSSC exams held in 2021 (graduate-level in May, forest guard in July, secretariat security guard in September) covering 1,282 posts were cancelled on 31 December 2022 after an STF probe found the papers were leaked; fresh exams ordered.
August 7, 2021	HSSC Male Constable (General Duty) Recruitment Exam (Advt 04/2020)	Haryana Staff Selection Commission (HSSC)	Haryana	Exam cancelled, Retest, Arrests/FIR, Probe (STF)	Written examination for Male Constable (Cat 01, Advt 04/2020) scheduled on 7–8 August 2021 was cancelled by HSSC after solved answer keys leaked and circulated on social media; Haryana Police and STF arrested five in Kaithal with answer keys, expanding into an interstate syndicate probe with 167+ arrests over four years.
August 17, 2021	Punjab Police Sub-Inspector Recruitment Examination 2021	Punjab Police Recruitment Board	Punjab	Cancelled & Retest	The Punjab government cancelled the written examination for Sub-Inspector recruitment held in August 2021 after a Special Investigation Team confirmed question paper leaks, remote screen manipulation, and solver gang operations.
September 3, 2021	JEE (Main) 2021	National Testing Agency (NTA)	All India	Arrests/FIR, Probe (CBI)	CBI arrested seven people including three directors of a private education company that solved registered candidates' online papers by remote access from a chosen exam centre in Sonepat, charging large sums for admission to top NITs. Date is the arrest date; the manipulation concerned the 2021 online sittings.
September 12, 2021	NEET-UG 2021	National Testing Agency (NTA)	All India	Arrests/FIR	Invigilator and solver-gang involvement with localized arrests (notably a Rajasthan impersonation/solver racket); no nationwide cancellation or retest.
September 13, 2021	RPSC Sub-Inspector / Platoon Commander Recruitment Examination 2021	Rajasthan Public Service Commission (RPSC)	Rajasthan	Arrests/FIR, Probe (SIT/SOG), Exam cancelled	Recruitment examination conducted by RPSC across 13–15 September 2021 for 859 Sub-Inspector and Platoon Commander posts was compromised after paper leaks organized by the Jagdish Vishnoi syndicate; in 2024, Rajasthan Police Special Operations Group (SOG) busted the network, arresting over 40 individuals including 15+ trainee sub-inspectors (including the 1st rank holder) at Rajasthan Police Academy and former RPSC member Ramuram Raika.
September 13, 2021	Rajasthan Police Sub-Inspector (SI) & Platoon Commander Recruitment Exam 2021	Rajasthan Public Service Commission (RPSC)	Rajasthan	Exam cancelled, Arrests/FIR, Probe (SOG)	The 13–15 September 2021 examination for 859 Sub-Inspector posts (attracting nearly 8 lakh applicants) was compromised after question papers were leaked from Jaipur centers by syndicates and sold to candidates; the Rajasthan Police Special Operations Group (SOG) arrested over 140 accused including 50+ trainee Sub-Inspectors, former RPSC members Babulal Katara and Ramu Ram Raika, and in August 2025 the Rajasthan High Court cancelled the entire recruitment examination.
September 25, 2021	APDCL Recruitment Examination 2021	Assam Power Distribution Company Limited (APDCL)	Assam	Retest recommended, CM Special Vigilance Cell probe, Arrests/FIR	Special Vigilance Cell busted a cash-for-jobs racket leaking question papers and answer keys ahead of APDCL recruitment exam, arresting 10 individuals including an OSD to the APDCL Chairman.
September 26, 2021	HPSC Dental Surgeon & HCS (Prelims) Recruitment Examinations 2021	Haryana Public Service Commission (HPSC)	Haryana	Arrests/FIR, Probe (Vigilance/ED), Dismissal of officials	Haryana State Vigilance Bureau arrested HPSC Deputy Secretary Anil Nagar and middlemen in November 2021, recovering over ₹3.5 crore cash paid to manipulate OMR sheets and fill in blank answers for candidates in the 26 September 2021 Dental Surgeon and HCS exams; the Haryana government dismissed Nagar under Article 311.
September 26, 2021	REET 2021 (Rajasthan Eligibility Exam for Teachers) Level 2	Board of Secondary Education Rajasthan (BSER/RBSE)	Rajasthan	Exam cancelled, Arrests/FIR, Retest	Rajasthan Government cancelled the REET 2021 Level-2 examination after a Special Operations Group (SOG) probe confirmed the question paper was leaked from the strong room of the Shiksha Sankul in Jaipur two days prior to the test; Chief Minister Ashok Gehlot announced a fresh re-exam.
October 3, 2021	Karnataka Police Sub-Inspector (PSI) Recruitment Examination 2021	Karnataka State Police	Karnataka	Exam cancelled, Arrests/FIR, Probe (CBI/SIT)	Recruitment examination for 545 Police Sub-Inspector posts held on 3 October 2021 was marred by mass Bluetooth cheating and OMR sheet tampering at Jnana Jyothi English Medium School in Kalaburagi; CID investigation led to the arrest of over 100 individuals, including Additional Director General of Police (ADGP Recruitment) Amrit Paul, DySP Shantha Kumar, coaching center owners, and dozens of selected candidates; Government of Karnataka cancelled the entire examination on 29 April 2022, which was later upheld by the Karnataka High Court.
October 23, 2021	Patwari (village revenue officer) recruitment exam	Rajasthan Staff Selection Board (RSMSSB)	Rajasthan (Jaipur/Dausa)	Arrests/FIR	A coaching-institute owner was arrested for selling a fake question paper (taking Rs 4 lakh advance) and a government clerk for appearing as a dummy candidate; the paper sold was found to be fake, not a genuine leak of the official paper. Exam concluded and was not cancelled. Over 5,300 posts; ~15.62 lakh registered.
October 31, 2021	Maharashtra Public Health Department (Arogya Vibhag) Group C & Group D Recruitment 2021	Maharashtra Public Health Department	Maharashtra	Arrests/FIR, Probe (cyber police)	Written examination for Health Department Group C and Group D positions held on 31 October 2021 was compromised after 92 of 100 questions leaked and circulated on social media; Pune Police Cyber Cell filed a 3,816-page chargesheet against 20 accused, unearthing linked paper leaks across MHADA and TET examinations.
November 19, 2021	Pimpri-Chinchwad Police Constable Exam 2021	Maharashtra Police	Maharashtra	Crime Branch probe, 56+ arrested	Crime Branch busted paper leaks and organized cheating involving spy micro-devices, walkie-talkies, and impersonating dummy candidates during police recruitment written examinations.
November 28, 2021	Uttar Pradesh Teacher Eligibility Test (UPTET) 2021	UP Examination Regulatory Authority / Basic Education Board (UPBEB)	Uttar Pradesh	Exam cancelled, Arrests/FIR	UP government cancelled the UPTET 2021 exam across all centres after question papers were leaked on WhatsApp groups on the morning of 28 November 2021; UP STF arrested dozens of solver gang members and the director of the exam regulatory authority was arrested and suspended.
December 4, 2021	UKSSSC Graduate Level (Snatak) recruitment exam 2021	Uttarakhand Subordinate Services Selection Commission (UKSSSC)	Uttarakhand	Exam cancelled, Arrests/FIR, Probe (STF/SIT)	Uttarakhand Special Task Force (STF) arrested multiple accused including mastermind Khalid Malik in connection with the question paper leak of the UKSSSC Graduate Level examination held in December 2021; the state government subsequently cancelled the examination.
December 12, 2021	Head Clerk recruitment exam	Gujarat Subordinate Services Selection Board (GSSSB)	Gujarat	Exam cancelled, Arrests/FIR	Question paper obtained from a printing-press manager and sold to candidates before the test; exam cancelled and a retest ordered.
December 12, 2021	MHADA staff recruitment exam	Maharashtra Housing and Area Development Authority (MHADA)	Maharashtra	Exam cancelled, Arrests/FIR	Three held in Pune (including a question-setter at the private vendor) with digital copies of the paper; exam cancelled pre-emptively.
January 24, 2022	Railway Recruitment Board NTPC 2019 Exam	Railway Recruitment Control Board	All India	Exam suspended, High-Power Committee, Revised results	Widespread candidate protests and railway blockades erupted across Bihar and Uttar Pradesh over shortlisting criteria and second-stage CBT-2 introduction for Group D posts, prompting the Ministry of Railways to suspend exams and revise shortlisting rules.
March 3, 2022	KEA Assistant Professor Exam 2022 (Geography)	Karnataka Examinations Authority (KEA)	Karnataka	CID probe, Prime accused arrested	Geography question paper leaked via WhatsApp prior to examination after a candidate obtained 18 question paper images from a former Mysuru university assistant professor.
March 6, 2022	JKSSB Financial Accounts Assistant (FAA) Exam 2022	Jammu & Kashmir Services Selection Board (JKSSB)	Jammu and Kashmir	Exam cancelled, CBI probe, FIR against 20	The selection list for 972 Financial Accounts Assistant posts was scrapped by J&K Administration following an inquiry confirming question paper leaks and OMR sheet tampering facilitated by private agency MeritTrac.
March 13, 2022	Rajasthan High Court Lower Division Clerk (LDC) recruitment exam 2022	Rajasthan High Court	Rajasthan	Exam cancelled	Rajasthan Police Special Operations Group (SOG) busted the paper leak of the High Court Lower Division Clerk (LDC) recruitment exam held in March 2022, arresting nine candidates and solver gang members who received solved question papers via Bluetooth and WhatsApp.
March 25, 2022	MP Primary School Teacher Eligibility Test (MP TET Varg-3) 2022	Madhya Pradesh Employees Selection Board (MPESB)	Madhya Pradesh	Technical audit by MAP-IT, FIR registered	Screenshots of question papers from the MP Primary School Teacher Eligibility Test (Varg-3) held in March 2022 were leaked from a test centre in Sagar, triggering widespread student protests; an investigation revealed remote screen-sharing manipulation.
March 27, 2022	Gujarat Forest Guard Recruitment Exam 2022	Gujarat University / State Forest Department	Gujarat	Arrests/FIR	A candidate in Mehsana was found with a full answer sheet during the exam; the state minister called it a copy case while opposition alleged a leak.
March 27, 2022	Himachal Pradesh Police Constable Recruitment Written Examination 2022	Himachal Pradesh Police	Himachal Pradesh	Exam cancelled, Retest, Arrests/FIR, Probe (SIT/CBI)	Written test conducted on 27 March 2022 for 1,334 constable posts (with over 75,000 candidates) was cancelled after police investigations revealed question papers had been stolen and sold for ₹3–5 lakh; the CBI took over the case and filed chargesheets against 88 accused from interstate syndicates.
March 27, 2022	Sub-Inspector Recruitment Written Examination 2022	Jammu & Kashmir Services Selection Board (JKSSB)	Jammu and Kashmir	Exam cancelled, Arrests/FIR, Probe (CBI/ED)	Written test held 27 March 2022 for about 1,200 sub-inspector posts; the selection list was cancelled in July 2022 over paper-leak and malpractice allegations and the case went to the CBI, which chargesheeted 33 accused on 12 November 2022. The ED arrested the alleged kingpin, a Haryana resident, on 24 July 2024 in the linked money-laundering case and his bail was refused.
May 8, 2022	BPSC 67th Combined Competitive Exam (Prelims)	Bihar Public Service Commission (BPSC)	Bihar	Exam cancelled, Arrests/FIR, Probe (SIT)	Question paper screenshots went viral on social media minutes before the exam; BPSC cancelled the prelims and the EOU arrested a Block Development Officer (BDO) / magistrate-in-charge and three exam officials under the IT Act and Bihar exam-conduct law.
May 14, 2022	Rajasthan Police Constable recruitment exam	Rajasthan Police Recruitment & Promotion Board	Rajasthan	Exam cancelled, Arrests/FIR, Retest	Second shift paper was leaked via a screenshot from a Jhotwara exam centre; that shift was cancelled and a fresh test held on 2 July for affected candidates. Eight people arrested, including an assistant sub-inspector.
May 22, 2022	Naib Tehsildar recruitment test (78 posts)	Punjab Public Service Commission (PPSC)	Punjab	Arrests/FIR, Exam cancelled	Dummy candidates photographed question papers with hidden cameras and sent them to solvers in Haryana who relayed answers via Bluetooth/GSM devices; a deal of about ₹22 lakh was struck; five arrested (FIR 11 November 2022, more sought) and the government scrapped the merit list and ordered the exam re-conducted.
June 1, 2022	Assistant Engineer / Junior Engineer (AE/JE) recruitment exam	Uttarakhand Public Service Commission (UKPSC)	Uttarakhand	Arrests/FIR, Probe (SIT)	AE/JE exam held June 2022; an SIT found the question paper was leaked for ₹28 lakh. Nine people were named in an FIR at Kankhal police station (February 2023) and three were arrested, including a UKPSC section officer.
July 3, 2022	Jharkhand Diploma Level Combined Competitive Examination (JDLCCE / JSSC JE) 2022	Jharkhand Staff Selection Commission (JSSC)	Jharkhand	Exam cancelled, Retest, Arrests/FIR, Probe (SIT)	Question papers and answer keys for the Junior Engineer recruitment exam leaked on WhatsApp before the first shift on 3 July 2022; JSSC cancelled the examination statewide, and police arrested syndicate members and the director of the private conducting agency (Bynsis Technology) who tutored candidates in Patna safe houses.
July 31, 2022	UPSSSC Lekhpal (Mains) Recruitment Exam 2022	Uttar Pradesh Subordinate Services Selection Commission (UPSSSC)	Uttar Pradesh	Arrests/FIR	21 people including solvers and impersonators were arrested for using unfair means; the Samajwadi Party alleged a paper leak but UPSSSC denied any leak, calling them individual impersonation cases.
August 7, 2022	KPTCL Junior Assistant Recruitment Exam 2022	Karnataka Power Transmission Corporation Limited (KPTCL)	Karnataka	Arrests/FIR (12+ arrested), CID probe	A college vice-principal son disguised as a journalist photographed question papers inside a Gadag test centre and transmitted answers via WhatsApp to candidates wearing micro Bluetooth devices.
August 26, 2022	Assistant Engineer (Civil) exam	Arunachal Pradesh Public Service Commission (APPSC)	Arunachal Pradesh	Arrests/FIR, Probe (CBI/SIT)	AE (Civil) paper leaked; APPSC secretary and controller of examinations suspended and a CBI probe recommended.
October 16, 2022	TSPSC Group-I Preliminary Examination 2022	Telangana State Public Service Commission (TSPSC)	Telangana	Exam cancelled, Arrests/FIR, Probe (SIT)	Question papers for the Group-I Prelims, DAO, and AEE exams were stolen from TSPSC confidential server computers by commission staff using administrator credentials; TSPSC cancelled the 16 October 2022 examination on 17 March 2023 following SIT arrests.
November 12, 2022	Rajasthan Forest Guard Recruitment Exam 2022	Rajasthan Staff Selection Board (RSMSSB)	Rajasthan	Exam cancelled, Arrests/FIR	Evening shift cancelled after a paper-leak gang was busted in Rajsamand; a technical assistant had received answers on WhatsApp an hour before the test. Nine initially held; the SOG's probe later took total arrests to about 11.
December 4, 2022	HPSSC Junior Engineer (JE Civil/Electrical) Recruitment Examination 2022	Himachal Pradesh Staff Selection Commission (HPSSC)	Himachal Pradesh	Arrests & Commission Dissolved	The Special Investigation Team of Himachal Pradesh Vigilance Bureau registered an FIR after discovering evidence of question paper leaks in the Junior Engineer (Civil) examination conducted by the Himachal Pradesh Staff Selection Commission (HPSSC), Hamirpur. Officials and middlemen were arrested for selling solved papers.
December 23, 2022	BSSC 3rd Graduate Level (CGL) Combined Competitive Prelims 2022	Bihar Staff Selection Commission (BSSC)	Bihar	Exam cancelled, Probe (SIT)	Pages of the first-shift question paper (for 2,187 posts) were circulated on WhatsApp/Twitter as the exam began; BSSC referred the matter to the Economic Offences Unit (EOU) and cancelled the affected shift amid student protests and lathi-charge.
December 24, 2022	RPSC Senior Teacher Grade II General Knowledge exam 2022	Rajasthan Public Service Commission (RPSC)	Rajasthan	Exam cancelled, Arrests/FIR, Probe (SIT/ED)	Udaipur police intercepted a bus carrying 37 candidates and seven solver gang members solving the leaked General Knowledge paper hours before the RPSC 2nd Grade Teacher recruitment exam; RPSC cancelled the morning GK shift and 44 persons were arrested.
December 25, 2022	HPSSC Junior Office Assistant (IT) Examination (Post Code 965) 2022	Himachal Pradesh Staff Selection Commission (HPSSC)	Himachal Pradesh	Exam cancelled, Arrests/FIR, Probe (SIT/CBI)	Scheduled Junior Office Assistant (IT) recruitment examination was cancelled on 23 December 2022 after the HP State Vigilance and Anti-Corruption Bureau arrested an HPSSC secrecy branch official and five others with solved question papers and ₹2.5 lakh cash; the scandal prompted the state government to suspend and dissolve the Hamirpur-based commission.
January 8, 2023	Patwari / Lekhpal recruitment exam	Uttarakhand Public Service Commission (UKPSC)	Uttarakhand	Exam cancelled, Retest, Arrests/FIR	Special Investigation Team (SIT) of Haridwar police chargesheeted 60 accused in the Patwari-Lekhpal paper leak case, finding that an official and middlemen leaked question papers to candidate beneficiaries; UKPSC held a re-exam.
January 29, 2023	GPSSB Junior Clerk recruitment exam	Gujarat Panchayat Service Selection Board (GPSSB)	Gujarat	Exam cancelled, Arrests/FIR	Exam postponed hours before start after a copy of the question paper was seized; Gujarat ATS traced an inter-state racket.
February 7, 2023	MP NHM Contractual Staff Nurse recruitment examination 2023	National Health Mission, Madhya Pradesh (NHM MP)	Madhya Pradesh	Exam cancelled, Arrests/FIR	Gwalior Crime Branch raided a dhaba on the Gwalior–Dabra highway and busted an interstate syndicate with leaked question papers for the NHM MP Contractual Staff Nurse recruitment examination, arresting eight accused from four states; NHM MP immediately cancelled the examination.
February 19, 2023	Community Health Officer (CHO) Recruitment Exam 2022/2023	Rajasthan Staff Selection Board (RSMSSB)	Rajasthan	Exam cancelled, Retest, Arrests/FIR, Probe (SOG)	RSMSSB cancelled the Community Health Officer (CHO) recruitment examination held on 19 February 2023 after Rajasthan Police SOG confirmed that over 70 questions were leaked and circulated on social media before the exam; a re-examination was scheduled for 3 March 2024.
February 25, 2023	REET 2023 (Rajasthan Eligibility Examination for Teachers), Level I and Level II	Rajasthan Staff Selection Board (RSMSSB)	Rajasthan	Arrests/FIR	Hours before the examination, Rajasthan police raided Udaygarh Marriage Palace in the Mandore area of Jodhpur on a tip-off that the question paper was being sold to candidates staying there, and arrested 37 people — 30 candidates and seven alleged organisers — seizing a laptop, a printer and sheets of answers. The alleged ringleader said he had bought the paper for ₹40 lakh. Police said the seized questionnaire did not match the actual paper, and the exam went ahead for about nine lakh candidates.
March 5, 2023	TSPSC Assistant Engineer (Civil) Recruitment Exam 2023	Telangana State Public Service Commission (TSPSC)	Telangana	Exam cancelled, Arrests/FIR, Probe (CBI/SIT)	TSPSC confidential-section staff stole question papers from office computers via pen drives and sold them; multiple exams including AE, AEE, DAO, Group-I Prelims, TPBO, and Veterinary Assistant Surgeon were cancelled and an SIT probe launched.
March 12, 2023	Punjab State Teacher Eligibility Test (PSTET) 2023 Paper-II	SCERT Punjab	Punjab	Exam cancelled, Retest, 2 professors suspended	Punjab education minister Harjot Singh Bains cancelled PSTET 2023 held on 12 March 2023 after correct answers to multiple choice questions were found printed directly on the question papers; a probe was ordered and conducting university GNDU announced a re-test.
March 15, 2023	MP Patwari Recruitment Exam 2023 (Group-2 Sub-Group-4)	Madhya Pradesh Employees Selection Board (MPESB)	Madhya Pradesh	Probe	After 30 Jun 2023 results, aspirants and Congress alleged irregularities (7 of top-10 and 114 selections from one Gwalior centre, normalisation disputes); CM stayed appointments amid statewide protests; a state committee gave a clean chit (Feb 2024) and appointments resumed. Exam held online 15 Mar-26 Apr 2023. No paper leak established.
May 11, 2023	CGPSC State Service Examination 2021 (recruitment cycle 2020-2022)	Chhattisgarh Public Service Commission (CGPSC)	Chhattisgarh	Probe (CBI/SIT)+Arrests/FIR	CBI probe into nepotism/favouritism in recruitment for deputy collector, deputy SP and other posts; charge sheet alleges the then chairman leaked question papers to relatives and manipulated results, and that a businessman paid Rs 45 lakh to get his son and daughter-in-law selected. Date shown is the 2021 State Service result declaration; probe spans 2020-2022 exams.
May 25, 2023	MP Forest Guard (Vanrakshak) Recruitment Exam 2023	Madhya Pradesh Employees Selection Board (MPESB)	Madhya Pradesh	Probe	ESB withheld results of 113 candidates after detecting "abnormal patterns" suggesting possible irregularity/document manipulation, pending re-verification (reported Jun 2025); exam held online 25 May-20 Jun 2023 for ~1 lakh candidates for 1,670 posts.
June 3, 2023	AIIMS NORCET-4 (Nursing Officer Recruitment)	AIIMS New Delhi	All India	Arrests/FIR, Probe (CBI/SIT)	Paper leaked via doctored computer monitors giving remote access to solvers during the 3 June 2023 test for 3,055 nursing-officer posts; CBI arrested the alleged mastermind plus four others and booked a Mohali institute.
July 16, 2023	Junior Engineer (Civil) main written exam (Combined Technical Services 2022)	Odisha Staff Selection Commission (OSSC)	Odisha	Exam cancelled, Arrests/FIR	Seized papers matched the original; police confirmed the leak, exam cancelled and a fresh test held on 3 September 2023; show-cause to 55 candidates.
July 30, 2023	OSSC Accountant Recruitment Exam 2023	Odisha Staff Selection Commission (OSSC)	Odisha	Inquiry ordered, Public protests	Aspirants staged protests in Bhadrak district alleging that outer seals on question paper packets were tampered with prior to distribution during the OSSC Accountant recruitment test.
August 17, 2023	Talathi (village accountant) recruitment exam	Maharashtra Revenue Dept / TCS-iON	Maharashtra	Arrests/FIR	A repeat paper-leak suspect caught in Nashik on day one with 186 photos of the paper and spy gear; topper-favouritism allegations against the conducting agency.
October 1, 2023	Bihar Police Constable Recruitment Written Exam	Central Selection Board of Constable (CSBC)	Bihar	Exam cancelled, Arrests/FIR, Probe (SIT)	CSBC cancelled the 1 October constable exam (for 21,391 vacancies) after complaints of paper leak and organised cheating; the EOU registered 67 FIRs across 21 districts and arrested 148 people.
October 28, 2023	KEA First Division Assistant (FDA) Exam 2023	Karnataka Examinations Authority (KEA)	Karnataka	Exam postponed, CID probe, KCOCA arrests (30+ arrested)	An organized paper leak and cheating network masterminded by RD Patil used custom micro Bluetooth ear-pieces and walkie-talkies to leak questions and relay answers to candidates appearing for KEA exams.
October 28, 2023	KEA Recruitment Examinations for Various Boards and Corporations 2023	Karnataka Examinations Authority (KEA)	Karnataka (Kalaburagi/Yadgir)	Arrests/FIR, Probe (CID)	During competitive recruitment exams conducted by KEA across Karnataka for FDA, SDA, and state corporation posts, a high-tech cheating network was busted using custom micro-Bluetooth earpieces and walkie-talkies stitched into candidate shirts; CID took over the investigation and arrested over 40 conspirators and candidates including repeat scam mastermind R.D. Patil.
January 28, 2024	JSSC CGL (Combined Graduate Level / JGGLCCE)	Jharkhand Staff Selection Commission (JSSC)	Jharkhand	Exam cancelled, Probe (CBI/SIT)	JSSC cancelled the third-shift General Knowledge paper of the General Graduate Level Combined Competitive Exam (JGGLCCE / CGL) held on 28 January 2024 after questions were leaked on WhatsApp; the upcoming sitting scheduled for 4 February 2024 was also postponed.
February 11, 2024	UPPSC Review Officer/Assistant Review Officer (RO/ARO) Preliminary Exam 2023	Uttar Pradesh Public Service Commission (UPPSC)	Uttar Pradesh	Exam cancelled, Retest, Probe (STF)	After complaints that questions went viral on social media, the government cancelled the 11 February 2024 prelims, ordered a re-exam within six months and handed the probe to the STF.
February 17, 2024	UP Police Constable Recruitment Exam 2024	Uttar Pradesh Police Recruitment and Promotion Board (UPPRPB)	Uttar Pradesh	Exam cancelled, Retest, Arrests/FIR, Probe (STF)	The 17–18 February 2024 exam for 60,244 posts (over 48 lakh candidates) was cancelled after the paper was leaked in transit from the press; STF arrested the three masterminds and dozens more, and the board chairperson was removed.
March 10, 2024	Odisha Police Sub-Inspector (SI) Recruitment Exam	Odisha Police	Odisha	Exam cancelled, CBI probe, 123+ arrested	Odisha Crime Branch uncovered an interstate syndicate in the CPSE-2024 SI recruitment exam where candidates paid ₹20–25 lakh each for leaked question papers and were transported to Vizianagaram; police made 123 total arrests including key conspirators and seized 150+ digital devices.
March 15, 2024	BPSC TRE 3.0 School Teacher Recruitment Exam	Bihar Public Service Commission (BPSC)	Bihar	Exam cancelled, Retest, Arrests/FIR, Probe (SIT)	EOU found a solver gang obtained the paper before bar-coding/printing; BPSC cancelled both shifts of the 15 March exam and hundreds were detained, with the retest later held in July 2024.
March 17, 2024	JPSC Combined Civil Services Preliminary Exam (11th-13th CSE)	Jharkhand Public Service Commission (JPSC)	Jharkhand (Jamtara/Chatra/Dhanbad)	Probe	Candidates at centres in Jamtara, Chatra and Dhanbad created a ruckus alleging the JPSC prelims question paper was leaked (claiming seals were already open); JPSC, the deputy commissioners and the state government rejected the claim, ruled out any leak, and said action would be taken against those spreading false information.
May 5, 2024	NEET-UG 2024	National Testing Agency (NTA)	All India	Retest, Arrests/FIR, Probe (CBI/SIT)	CBI confirmed a localized paper leak in Patna and Hazaribagh where solved question papers were provided to candidates on the morning of the 5 May 2024 exam; the Supreme Court declined a nationwide retest, while 1,563 candidates who received compensatory grace marks were retested on 23 June 2024.
June 8, 2024	Tripura ADC Sub-Zonal Development Officer & Deputy Principal Officer Recruitment Examination 2024	Tripura Tribal Areas Autonomous District Council (TTAADC)	Tripura	Exam postponed, Arrests/FIR, Inquiry	The recruitment examination scheduled for 9 June 2024 for 110 posts of Sub-Zonal Development Officer and Deputy Principal Officer was postponed on 8 June 2024 after solved answer keys were leaked on social media; TTAADC dissolved its recruitment board, lodged an FIR at West Agartala Police Station, and police arrested two persons including a printing shop owner.
June 18, 2024	UGC-NET June 2024	National Testing Agency (NTA)	All India	Exam cancelled, Retest, Probe (CBI)	Held on 18 June 2024 for over 11 lakh registered candidates and cancelled the next day after inputs from the Indian Cyber Crime Coordination Centre suggested the question paper was compromised; the CBI registered an FIR and subsequently filed a closure report concluding the circulated screenshot was doctored and no leak occurred.
June 21, 2024	Joint CSIR-UGC-NET June 2024	National Testing Agency (NTA)	All India	Postponed, Logistics/integrity review	National Testing Agency postponed the Joint CSIR-UGC-NET June 2024 examination four days prior to its scheduled conduct citing logistical issues and institutional integrity audits following paper leak cancellations of UGC-NET and NEET-UG.
June 23, 2024	MPPSC State Service Preliminary Examination 2024	Madhya Pradesh Public Service Commission (MPPSC)	Madhya Pradesh	Arrests/FIR, Probe	A Telegram account claimed that question papers for the MPPSC State Service preliminary examination were available for ₹2,500 each; MPPSC verified the circulating paper against original sets, declared it fake, and Indore Police registered an FIR against unidentified fraudsters while the exam proceeded as scheduled on 23 June 2024.
June 23, 2024	NEET-PG 2024	National Board of Examinations in Medical Sciences (NBEMS)	All India	None reported	Union Ministry of Health and Family Welfare postponed the NEET-PG 2024 entrance examination just hours before its scheduled conduct on 23 June 2024 as a precautionary measure to thoroughly assess the robustness of processes amid integrity concerns in national exams; rescheduled to 11 August 2024.
September 21, 2024	Jharkhand General Graduate Level Combined Competitive Examination (JSSC CGL / JGGLCCE) 2024	Jharkhand Staff Selection Commission (JSSC)	Jharkhand	Arrests/FIR, Probe (CID)	Jharkhand CID investigating the JSSC CGL (JGGLCCE) 2024 paper leak allegations arrested multiple accused including key mastermind Mithilesh Singh in Delhi; CID probe found that solver gangs had circulated questions and collected money from candidates across Jharkhand.
December 1, 2024	NHM Bihar Community Health Officer (CHO) Recruitment Exam	State Health Society (SHS)/NHM Bihar	Bihar	Exam cancelled, Arrests/FIR, Probe (SIT)	The computer-based CHO exam for about 4,500 posts starting 1 December 2024 was cancelled after the EOU found a solver gang accessed exam computers via proxy servers and remote software; about 37 people were detained in raids on multiple centres.
December 13, 2024	BPSC 70th Combined Competitive Examination (preliminary)	Bihar Public Service Commission (BPSC)	Bihar	Exam cancelled at one centre, Retest	About 4.80 lakh candidates sat the preliminary examination at 945 centres. Candidates at the Bapu Examination Complex in Patna alleged that the paper had been leaked and that the seal on the question paper was found broken; after a full-bench meeting the commission cancelled that centre's examination and ordered a re-test there on 4 January 2025, while declining to postpone or scrap the examination elsewhere.
March 4, 2025	East Central Railway departmental promotion exam 2025 (Chief Loco Pilot)	East Central Railway / Railway Board	All India	Arrests/FIR, Probe (CBI/SIT), Exam cancelled	CBI arrested 26 East Central Railway (ECR) officials at Mughal Sarai a day before the chief-loco-pilot departmental exam and seized ₹1.17 crore; 17 candidates caught with handwritten question-paper photocopies. Railway Board then cancelled pending Group-C departmental selections and shifted all such exams to RRB centralised CBT.
July 20, 2025	Special Odisha Teacher Eligibility Test (Special OTET) 2025	Board of Secondary Education, Odisha (BSE)	Odisha	Exam cancelled, Arrests/FIR	Special OTET 2025 for over 75,000 in-service primary teachers was cancelled hours before commencement after question papers leaked on social media; Odisha Crime Branch arrested eight persons including BSE Vice-President Nihar Ranjan Mohanty.
August 24, 2025	JKSSB Junior Engineer (Electrical) Recruitment Exam 2025	Jammu & Kashmir Services Selection Board (JKSSB)	Jammu and Kashmir	Exam cancelled, Retest announced, Inquiry ordered	JKSSB cancelled the OMR-based written examination for Junior Engineer (Electrical) posts under the Power Development Department scheduled across 35 venues in Jammu and Srinagar on 24 August 2025 after solved question papers and videos surfaced on social media prior to the test.
September 21, 2025	Graduate-level recruitment exam	Uttarakhand Subordinate Services Selection Commission (UKSSSC)	Uttarakhand	Exam cancelled, Retest, Arrests/FIR, Probe (CBI/SIT)	Jammu and Kashmir Services Selection Board cancelled the graduate-level recruitment test after investigation confirmed question paper leaks and paper-setting violations by private conducting agencies.
October 15, 2025	IGIMS MBBS Second Semester Professional Examination 2025	Indira Gandhi Institute of Medical Sciences (IGIMS)	Bihar	Exam cancelled, Probe	Indira Gandhi Institute of Medical Sciences (IGIMS) administration cancelled the MBBS second-semester examination for the 2023 batch after an inquiry committee detected question paper leakage and answer-sheet manipulation.
November 10, 2025	Manipur Civil Services Combined Competitive (Mains) Examination 2022	Manipur Public Service Commission (MPSC)	Manipur	Exam cancelled, Retest	Punjab education minister Harjot Singh Bains cancelled PSTET 2023 held on 12 March 2023 after correct answers to multiple choice questions were found printed directly on the question papers; a probe was ordered and conducting university GNDU announced a re-test.
November 23, 2025	Teacher Eligibility Test (TET)	Maharashtra State Council of Examinations (MSCE)	Maharashtra	Arrests/FIR, Probe (CBI/SIT)	Kolhapur police busted a ring selling leaked TET papers for about ₹3 lakh each; test-takers caught awaiting materials at a raid.
December 21, 2025	Group-B recruitment exam (408 posts incl Naib Tehsildar, Treasury Officers, Senior Assistant)	Punjab Subordinate Services Selection Board (PSSSB)	All India|Punjab (Bathinda highlighted)	Probe (SIT/VB)	Candidates who appeared in the 21 December 2025 examination for 408 Group-B posts (including Naib Tehsildar and Treasury Officers) flagged irregularities including whitener marks on question papers at a Bathinda centre; PSSSB referred the matter to the Vigilance Bureau for investigation.
January 7, 2026	UPESSC Assistant Professor Recruitment Examination 2026	Uttar Pradesh Education Service Selection Commission (UPESSC)	Uttar Pradesh	Exam cancelled, Arrests/FIR, STF investigation	Uttar Pradesh government cancelled the UPESSC Assistant Professor recruitment examination held on 16–17 April 2025 after the state STF arrested three members of an examination racket, including a confidential assistant to the commission chairperson Prof. Kirti Pandey who subsequently resigned.
April 11, 2026	Excise Constable recruitment examination 2026	Jharkhand Staff Selection Commission (JSSC)	Jharkhand	Arrests/FIR	Ranchi police raided an under-construction building at Radgaon under Tamar police station on 11 April 2026 and arrested 159 candidates who had gathered to receive leaked materials for the JSSC Excise Constable recruitment exam; police subsequently filed a chargesheet against 169 accused.
April 14, 2026	Assistant Education Development Officer (AEDO) Recruitment Exam 2026	Bihar Public Service Commission (BPSC)	Bihar	Exam cancelled, Arrests/FIR, Probe (EOU)	BPSC cancelled the AEDO examination held between 14 and 21 April 2026 for 10.97 lakh applicants following detection of irregularities and answer key circulation; Economic Offences Unit (EOU) arrested mastermind biometric operator Atul Raj Pandey in Patna.
May 3, 2026	NEET-UG 2026	National Testing Agency (NTA)	All India	Exam cancelled, Retest, Probe (CBI/SIT), Arrests/FIR	National Testing Agency conducted NEET-UG 2026 across India; allegations of question paper circulation and solver gang operations in Godhra and Patna led to CBI probe and arrests of interstate racketeers.
June 27, 2026	Maharashtra Teacher Eligibility Test (MAHA-TET) 2026	Maharashtra State Council of Examinations (MSCE)	Maharashtra	Exam postponed, Arrests/FIR, Probe (SIT)	Bhiwandi police seized copies of the leaked question paper from three men a day before the test scheduled at 1,028 centres; MSCE postponed the examination, an FIR was registered, an SIT formed, and total arrests reached 14 including the mastermind in Bihar.
July 4, 2026	HTET Level-3 / PGT (Haryana Teacher Eligibility Test)	Board of School Education Haryana (HBSE)	Haryana	None reported	Haryana Teacher Eligibility Test Level-3 exam held in November 2015 was cancelled after the question paper was leaked and circulated prior to the test; police arrested key members of a solver gang.
July 19, 2026	Pharmacist Officer recruitment exam	Baba Farid University of Health Sciences (BFUHS)	All India|Punjab (Faridkot/Kotkapura/Ferozepur)	Arrests/FIR	Odisha Police Crime Branch investigated paper leakage and unfair means in the Pharmacist Officer recruitment test, arresting syndicate touts and solvers.
August 19, 2026	JPSC State Departmental Recruitment Examinations (44 Selections) 2026	Jharkhand Public Service Commission (JPSC)	Jharkhand	Exams cancelled, Probe	Jharkhand government scrapped 44 recruitment examinations conducted by JPSC following sustained student protests, an inquiry into paper leaks and exam conduct irregularities by an outsourced agency, and subsequent court challenges.

== See also ==
- Paper leak in India
- Public Examinations (Prevention of Unfair Means) Act, 2024
- Vyapam scam
- 2024 NEET controversy
- West Bengal School Service Commission recruitment scam
- Staff Selection Commission exam controversies
- Education in India
