= National Recruitment Agency =

Central Recruitment Agency in India

- Abbreviation: NRA
- Formation: 19 August 2020; 6 years ago
- Type: Central Recruitment Agency
- Headquarters: New Delhi, India
- Region served: India

National Recruitment Agency is a Central Recruitment Agency established by the Government of India, that will conduct a Common Eligibility Test (CET) for selection to all of the Group C and Group D employee posts in all central government establishments which includes all of the central public sector undertakings and all of the central autonomous bodies. NRA has representatives of Ministry of Railways, Ministry of Finance, SSC, RRB and IBPS.

== Background ==
Before the establishment of the National Recruitment Agency, the recruitment exams to all of the Group 'C' and Group 'D' post under the Government of India (including Indian Railways, ministries and all central public sector units), were done separately and most of these posts required similar education qualification. These multiple recruitment examinations were a burden to candidates as they had to pay fees to multiple recruiting agencies and also travel long distances to complete the duplicate exams.

In order to avoid these problems faced by the candidates, creating a National Recruitment Agency was proposed by Nirmala Sitharaman, finance minister of India on her 2020-21 budget speech on 1 February 2020. And on 19 August 2020 the Union Cabinet decided to set up a National Recruitment Agency which will conduct a Common Eligibility Test (CET) twice a year for the different posts. The Union Cabinet approved Rs 1,517-crore for this purpose, which the Ministry of Personnel, Public Grievances and Pensions Jitendra Singh described as “one of the most landmark reforms in the history of Independent India”.The Prime Minister Narendra Modi tweeted: “The National Recruitment Agency will prove to be a boon for crores of youngsters. Through the common eligibility test, it will eliminate multiple tests and save precious time as well as resources. This will also be a big boost to transparency”.

== Composition ==
The National Recruitment Agency will have representatives of:

- Ministry of Railways (India)
- Minister of Finance (India) / Department of Financial Services
- Staff Selection Commission (SSC)
- Railway Recruitment Boards (RRBs)
- Institute of Banking Personnel Selection (IBPS)

== Features of Common Eligibility Test (CET) ==
The Common Eligibility Test (CET) will replace the current preliminary examinations held by SSC, IBPS, RRB, other departments, organisations, central public sector units and ministries under central government for recruitment to Group C and Group D posts under union government civil services, union government defence services and also various other posts in all the union government services. Separate CETs will be conducted for matriculate level, higher secondary and graduate applicants . The scores received in these exams will be valid for 3 years

=== Medium of CET ===
The Common Eligibility Test (CET) of National Recruitment Agency (NRA) will be conducted in 12 languages (Assamese, Bengali, Gujarati, Hindi, Kannada, Malayalam, Marathi, Odia, Punjabi, Tamil, Telugu and Urdu) that are in the Eighth Schedule of the Constitution of India and in English.

=== Number of Attempts ===
The aspirant will be allowed unlimited attempts within a prescribed age limit to better his CET score, with the best being considered.

=== Venue of Exam ===
Applicants need not travel outside their respective district to access a test centre, with 1,000 centres proposed countrywide with at least one per district. Also, money spent on fees for multiple recruitment tests will be saved. The CET score, which will be generated immediately, shall be made available to the candidate as well as the individual recruitment agency and can be expected to improve transparency.

== See also ==
- National Testing Agency
- List of Public service commissions in India
