= Indian examination paper leaks =

Unauthorised disclosure of examination papers in India

There have been several examples of Indian examination paper leaks, criminal acts which involve releasing a government recruitment or academic examination paper before the scheduled date and time of the examination. It is a form of organised crime that involves the unauthorised disclosure, access, and distribution of question papers, often for monetary gain. This phenomenon has become a recurring crisis, undermining the integrity of the country's education and public employment systems, affecting millions of aspirants annually.

== Mode of operation ==
The execution of a paper leak is often a sophisticated operation involving a nexus of corrupt officials, coaching centre owners, printing press staff, and middlemen. The chain of events typically follows a pattern. The leak can originate at multiple points in the examination supply chain, such as from staff at the printing press with access to master copies, during the transportation and storage of papers, or from bribed officials at the examination centres who open sealed packets prematurely. Once the paper is obtained, it is rapidly distributed through a clandestine network. Unscrupulous coaching institutes often play a pivotal role in selling the paper to their students for exorbitant sums, ranging from a few lakh to tens of lakh rupees. Digital channels like WhatsApp and Telegram are used for mass distribution. Finally, the aspirants who buy the paper are often gathered at a secret location a day before the exam, where they are made to memorise the answers before being released just hours before the examination begins.

== Causes and contributing factors ==
The persistence of paper leaks in India is attributed to a combination of interconnected socio-economic, systemic, and legal factors. A primary driver is the high-stakes competition for a limited number of seats in prestigious courses and coveted government jobs. For instance, in 2024, over 2.4 million students appeared for the NEET-UG exam for approximately 100,000 MBBS seats. This desperation makes aspirants and parents vulnerable and is exploited by a well-entrenched "education mafia". Furthermore, the system itself has logistical vulnerabilities in the large-scale process of conducting pen-and-paper examinations. Historically, weak legal deterrents and low conviction rates failed to create fear of the law. Lastly, modern technology has become an enabler, as smartphones and encrypted messaging have made the rapid distribution of leaked papers easier than ever.

== Impact on society ==
Paper leaks weaken the very principle of meritocracy. They create inequality, allowing privilege and dishonesty to triumph over hard work. When undeserving candidates secure jobs or admissions, the quality of professionals declines, affecting industries and governance alike. Students and families suffer psychological stress, leading to frustration and cynicism among the youth. Economically, re-examinations drain public funds and delay academic timelines. Trust in institutions erodes, and corruption becomes normalized, embedding itself into the social fabric. On a global scale, nations plagued by exam leaks face reputational damage, with their degrees and qualifications viewed with suspicion abroad. Thus, the ripple effects of paper leaks extend far beyond classrooms, weakening society’s ethical, economic, and professional foundations.

== Notable incidents ==
=== All India examinations ===
Examinations conducted by central agencies for nationwide admissions or recruitment are frequent targets of paper leaks due to their immense scale and high stakes. Bodies like the National Testing Agency (NTA), the Union Public Service Commission (UPSC), the Staff Selection Commission (SSC), and the Central Board of Secondary Education (CBSE) have all faced challenges in securing their examination processes. Several major incidents have highlighted these vulnerabilities. The NEET-UG 2024 leak became a significant national issue, with investigations revealing a widespread nexus in states like Bihar and Gujarat, prompting a CBI probe and Supreme Court intervention. In 2018, the CBSE faced embarrassment when the Class 12 Economics and Class 10 Mathematics papers were leaked. Similarly, the SSC Combined Graduate Level (CGL) examination in 2017 was marred by leak allegations, sparking massive protests and a CBI inquiry. An earlier instance was the All India Pre-Medical Test (AIPMT) in 2015, which the Supreme Court cancelled entirely due to a large-scale leak.

=== State examinations ===
In 2024, the Uttar Pradesh government had to cancel the police constable recruitment exam, affecting nearly 4.8 million applicants, after the paper was widely circulated. The same state's RO/ARO exam was also cancelled that year for similar reasons. In Bihar, the 67th BPSC Combined Competitive Exam in 2022 was cancelled after the question paper went viral on social media. Rajasthan witnessed the REET 2021 scandal, where the exam for teachers was nullified due to a massive leak involving state officials. Perhaps the most infamous is the Vyapam Scam in Madhya Pradesh, a long-running scandal uncovered around 2013 involving dozens of exams and the mysterious deaths of several individuals linked to the investigation. Similarly, West Bengal has been embroiled in the School Service Commission (SSC) recruitment scam, where teaching jobs were allegedly sold for money, involving manipulation of results and OMR sheets, leading to a major political controversy and investigations by central agencies.

== Legal framework and government response ==
In response to the escalating crisis, the Indian government enacted a dedicated central law in 2024, the Public Examinations (Prevention of Unfair Means) Act, 2024. This Act was passed by the Parliament of India to serve as a comprehensive legal framework to curb malpractice in public examinations. Its scope covers public examinations conducted by central bodies like the Union Public Service Commission (UPSC), the Staff Selection Commission (SSC), the National Testing Agency (NTA), and various central ministries. The law stipulates severe penalties; for instance, any individual resorting to unfair means can face imprisonment of three to five years and a fine up to ₹10 lakh. For those involved in organised paper leak crimes, the punishment is far more stringent, mandating a minimum of five to ten years' imprisonment and a mandatory minimum fine of ₹1 crore. The Act also holds examination service providers accountable, with provisions for fines up to ₹1 crore and the recovery of the examination's cost. Importantly, all offences under this act are cognizable, non-bailable, and non-compoundable.

== Proposed solutions and reforms ==
Beyond punitive legal measures, experts and committees have recommended a series of systemic reforms. These include technological interventions such as distributing question papers to centres in an end-to-end encrypted digital format and printing unique, watermarked QR codes on each paper to trace the source of a leak. In addition to technology, procedural reforms are considered crucial, such as reducing the number of people with access to papers, using GPS tracking for transport vehicles, and conducting robust background checks on all staff. Structural reforms are also suggested, like moving away from single high-stakes exams towards a system of multiple attempts to reduce desperation and conducting more examinations in the more secure computer-based test (CBT) format.

== See also ==
- List of paper leaks in India
- Staff Selection Commission exam controversies
- 2024 NEET controversy
- West Bengal School Service Commission recruitment scam
- Vyapam scam
- NEET 2026 Paper leak
