= Common Eligibility Test =

Indian public examination

- Acronym: CET
- Administrator: National Recruitment Agency
- Purpose: Recruitment of staff under group B and C (non-technical) for Central Govt.
- Year started: 2025
- Offered: twice a year
- Restrictions on attempts: No restriction
- Regions: India

The Common Eligibility Test (or CET), is a proposed examination in India for the recruitment of staff to non-gazetted posts in the central government, public sector banks and Indian Railways. The test is intended to be conducted by the National Recruitment Agency which was designed to function as a central agency of the Government of India. The establishment of the National Recruitment Agency to replace multiple entrance examinations with a single examination was approved by Union Cabinet of India on 19 August 2020.

As of October 2026, the official notifications and exam schedules for the CET have yet to be released by the National Recruitment Agency.

The National Recruitment Agency is intended to conduct a separate CET each for the three levels of graduate, higher secondary (12th pass), and the matriculate (10th pass) candidates for various non-technical posts. Presently such tests are being conducted by SSC, IBPS, Railways, and various other organizations.

== History ==
Presently multiple examinations by various agencies viz. Railways, IBPS, SSC are held for recruiting group B and C staff for various organizations of central govt. In the budget speech of 2020–21, the finance minister Nirmala Sitaraman proposed setting up National Recruitment Agency in order to replace multiple examinations for various government job recruitment in India by Central Govt. The upcoming CET will replace all these exams, which will save job seekers time and energy from filling multiple forms and focusing on all the examinations.

== Salient Features of NRA and CET ==
The CET will be held twice a year and the scores will be valid for the next three years from the date of declaration of result. The best of CET scores will be considered as the current score of the candidate.

=== Mode of Examination ===
The examination will be conducted as online examination, also the candidates will have to apply online for this examination. This test will be based on a multiple-choice objective type question paper.

=== No. of Attempts ===
There will be no limit on the number of attempts for taking this examination, but the upper age limit will be there. However, the relaxation in the upper age limit shall be given to candidates of SC/ST/OBC and other categories as per the extant policy of the Government.

=== Exams Replaced by CET ===
Here are the top three government exams by which the Common Eligibility Test gets replaced: Staff Selection Commission (SSC), NTPC Railway Recruitment Board (RRB), and Institute of Banking Personnel Selection (IBPS).

=== Medium of Examination ===
There are 22 languages in the Eighth Schedule of the Constitution of India, out of which this examination is conducted in 12 languages.

=== Examination Centers ===
For the ease of the candidates, each district will have at least one examination center, and in total around 1000 examination centers will be made .

=== Other features ===
The scores of CET will be shared with central government, state government, union territories, public sector undertakings and private sector, and it can also be used for recruitment in their respective departments and agencies /companies.
