= Testbook =

Indian educational technology company

- Company type: Private
- Industry: Edtech
- Founded: 2014; 12 years ago
- Headquarters: Gurgaon, Haryana, India
- Area served: Worldwide
- Key people: Ashutosh Kumar (Co-founder); Narendra Agrawal (Co-founder); Abhishek Sagar (Co-founder); Yadvendar Champawat (Co-founder); Manoj Munna (Co-founder); Praveen Agrawal (Co-founder)
- Website: testbook.com

Testbook is an Indian educational technology company, headquartered in Mumbai, India. Founded in January 2014 by a group of IIT Bombay and IIT Delhi alumni, Testbook prepares students for various competitive exams such as GATE, State PSC, SBI PO, IBPS PO, UPSC IAS Exam, Engineering Recruitment Exams, and SSC Exams.

== History ==
Testbook was established in January 2014 by Ashutosh Kumar, Yadvendar Champawat, Narendra Agrawal, Manoj Munna, Abhishek Sagar, and Praveen Agrawal, all of whom are alumni of Indian Institutes of Technology (IITs).

The company raised INR 1.5 crore (equivalent to under $250,000) in funding from LetsVenture and Ah! Ventures in 2014. In 2017, Testbook secured series A funding from Matrix Partners. Prior to this, Testbook had also received funding from S. Chand and Utsav Somani of AngelList, among other investors. In 2020, Testbook raised another INR 60 Cr ($8.3 Mn) from Iron Pillar.

Testbook has partnerships with educational institutions, including the Indian Institutes of Technology (IITs), IIT Madras, IIT Ropar, and IIT Gandhinagar.

== Awards ==
- National Startup Awards in the Education & Skill Development Sector category awarded by Union Minister Piyush Goyal in 2020.
- Best Emerging Enterprise Enabling Employment in India award in 2022.
