= MP-PET =

Madhya Pradesh-Pre Engineering Test was a state level examination organised by the Vyapam Board for admission to Engineering Colleges in Madhya Pradesh, India. After 2007 over 1 million students participated in the exam each year It was conducted by Vyapam, the Professional Examination Board of Madhya Pradesh. Vyapam had been conducting the MP-PET since 1981. PET was based on syllabus of subjects Physics, Chemistry and Mathematics of grade 11 and 12.

The examination is replaced by Joint Entrance Examination in 2014.

== Format ==
MP PET format of exam paper was objective type questions with single correct choice. Till, 2011 PET exam was conducted in 2 sets containing 100 questions each, first set of Mathematics and other of Physics and Chemistry. Each set was of 2 hours duration. But, in 2012 and 2013, PET was conducted in 1 set only of 3 hours duration and containing 100 questions of Mathematics and 50-50 questions from Physics and Chemistry. The marking scheme was +1 for correct answers and 0 for the incorrect answer. Earlier the marking used to be out of 900 points (300 each for Physics, Chemistry, and Mathematics), and it included negative marking. 3 points for the correct answer and -1 for the wrong answer.

MP-PET 2015 Eligibility

1. Students should pass in 10+2 scheme of MP Board of Secondary Education or equivalent with Physics, Chemistry, Maths and English securing 55% marks in aggregate. 2. Compartmental candidates are not considered. 3. Candidates who have appeared in the final year exam are also eligible. 4. Age of Candidates must be not more than 21 years on October 1 of the year of admission.

MP-PET 2015 Exam Pattern

It consists of objective type multiple choice questions (MCQs) in Mathematics, Physics and Chemistry (300 marks each). [The first part of MP-PET exam will have questions based on the subjects Mathematics, Physics and Chemistry. The second part will be optional and it can be any one of the following subjects such as Physics & Chemistry, Physics & Biotechnology and Physics & Biology. Totally 100 questions will be asked and each part carries 50 questions.] Medium of the exam is English. There is no negative marking in this test.
