= Maharashtra Public Service Commission =

State government agency

- Abbreviation: MPSC
- Type: Constitutional body
- Purpose: Recruitment
- Headquarters: Navi Mumbai, Maharashtra, India
- Location: Trishul Gold Field, Plot Number 34, Sarovar Vihar Lake, Sector 11, CBD Belapur, Navi Mumbai - 400 614, Maharashtra
- Region served: Maharashtra
- Official language: Marathi and English.
- Chairman: Shri. Vivek Bhimanwar
- Parent organization: Government of Maharashtra
- Website: www.mpsc.gov.in

The Maharashtra Public Service Commission (MPSC) is a government body of the state of Maharashtra, India. It is created under provisions of the Constitution of India, responsible for the recruitment of candidates for various state government jobs through competitive examinations, and the rules of reservation. It conducts various examinations to do the recruitments. The headquarters of the MPSC is located at the state capital Navi Mumbai.

Maharashtra Public Service Commission (MPSC) is a Constitutional Body established Under Article 315 of Constitution of India which provides a smooth and efficient functioning of the Government of Maharashtra by providing suitable candidates for various Government posts and advise them on various service matters like formulation of Recruitment Rules, advise on promotions, transfers and disciplinary actions etc.

== See also ==
- MPPSC
- UPSC
- UPPSC
- List of Public service commissions in India
