= Combined Graduate Level Examination =

Indian examination

- Type: Online standardized test
- Skills tested: General knowledge, reasoning, quantitative aptitude, English and basic Computer knowledge
- Purpose: Securing jobs in government organisations
- Year started: 1975 (51 years ago)
- Duration: 60 minutes (Tier I); 150 minutes (Tier II)
- Score range: 0-200 (Tier I); 0-390 (Tier II); 0-60 (Tier II, Computer Knowledge; Qualifying)
- Offered: Annually
- Regions: India
- Languages: English; Hindi
- Annual number of test takers: 3.6 million
- Prerequisites: Bachelor's degree
- Fee: INR 100 (Fee exemption for women, SC, ST, PwBD and ESM candidates)
- Website: https://ssc.gov.in/

Combined Graduate Level Examination (SSC CGL or CGLE) is an examination conducted by the Staff Selection Commission to recruit Group B and C officers to various posts in ministries, departments and organizations of the Government of India. The Staff Selection Commission was established in 1975.

== Prerequisites ==
Candidates applying for the various posts need to have a bachelor's degree from a recognized university at the time of applying. Applicants must be between 20 and 30 years of age. The age limits may vary depending on the position applied. For instance, the position for Inspector of Central Bureau of Narcotics, which originally had an age range from 18 to 27 years, was extended to 30 years in September 2018. The application fee for 2017 is Rs. 100. All women, people in Scheduled Castes or Scheduled Tribes, physically disabled people, and ex-servicemen eligible for reservation are exempted from paying the application fee.

== Structure ==
The examination has four major tiers which are conducted over different days, with results posted after each tier. Previous exams also included an interview tier, but following a government order, interviews were removed for all non-gazetted posts in the central government as of 1 January 2016. A computer proficiency test or a skill test was also added as a tier for some posts.

=== Tier I: Preliminary ===
The Tier I exam consists of a computer based objective multiple-choice exam with four sections, covering the subjects of:

- General intelligence and reasoning (25Q)
- General awareness (25Q)
- Quantitative aptitude (25Q)
- English comprehension (25Q)

The exam consists of 100 Questions and each of 2 marks, for a total of 200 marks. Based on results from Tier I, qualified candidates can then take the Tier II.

=== Tier II: Mains Exam ===
Also known as the Mains Exam, the Tier II exam consists of a written multiple-choice exam, in three sections:

- Section 1
  - Mathematical abilities
  - Reasoning and general intelligence
- Section 2
  - English language and comprehension
  - General awareness
- Section 3
  - Computer knowledge - covers the topics of word processing, spreadsheets, and making slides.
  - Data entry speed test - candidates enter data at the rate of 2000 key presses in 15 minutes. This is mainly for positions such as tax assistants.
- Section 4
  - Statistics
- Section 5
  - General studies (finance and economics)

Most positions require the candidate to take only the first three sections, but certain positions require the fourth or fifth sections.

=== Other exams ===
Other exams are required or were previously required for certain positions. The types include:

- Personality test/interview - discontinued starting 2016
- Physical endurance test/medical examination - required for police applicants

== Logistics ==
The 2016 exam was held in 44 batches across 96 cities. There were 3.8 million applicants, of which 1.48 million took the Tier 1 exam. 149,319 candidates passed Tier 1, and 35,096 candidates passed Tier 2. The final number of positions for the 2016 exam was estimated to be roughly 10,661.

Candidates were allowed to view their answer sheets and point out errors in the grading of answers for a fee of Rs. 100 per question.

For the 2017 exam, 3,026,598 candidates filled in the online application, of which 1,543,418 candidates took the exam. 226,229 candidates passed Tier 1, and 47,003 candidates passed Tier 2.

== Controversies ==
On 21 February 2018, it was reported that the screenshots of the question paper of the 2017 SSC Tier 2 exam appeared on social media before the exam began. This led to massive protests. The authorities canceled the exam and the Central Bureau of Investigation conducted an investigation, releasing a first information report that named several entities including employees at Sify Technologies that allegedly participated in the leak. The Tier 3 exam for that year was also postponed. The 2018 final results were announced in early 2021 after a delay of almost 3 years.

== Exam delays ==
Postponements in exam dates and/or results have been a regular occurrence. In addition to the delays in launching the 2017 Tier 1 exams, the 2016 exam final appointments were delayed. and the 2018 Tier 1 exams are being postponed.

== See also ==
- Combined Higher Secondary Level Examination
- Junior Science Talent Search Examination
- Services Selection Board
- Multi Tasking Staff Examination
- Public service commissions in India
