= Uttarakhand Subordinate Service Selection Commission =

State government commission conducting examinations and recruitment

- Abbreviation: UKSSSC
- Formation: September 17, 2014; 11 years ago
- Type: Government agency
- Headquarters: Dehradun
- Location: Thano Road, Raipur, Dehradun-248008
- Region served: Uttarakhand
- Services: Recruitment
- Chief Executive Officer: G. S. Martolia, IPS
- Website: Official website

The Uttarakhand Subordinate Service Selection Commission (UKSSSC) is a government organization in the state of Uttarakhand, India, responsible for conducting examinations and recruiting candidates for various subordinate services within the state. Established under the Uttarakhand Legislative Assembly Act, the commission aims to ensure transparent and merit-based recruitment processes for positions in various state departments.

== History ==
The UKSSSC was established to streamline the recruitment process for Group C posts in the Uttarakhand state government. It operates under the provisions of the Uttarakhand Subordinate Service Selection Commission Act, 2014, and works towards providing a fair selection system to attract skilled candidates for government services.

== Functions of UKSSC ==
1. Recruitment of the candidates.
  1. Conducting competitive exams and interviews for Group C and other subordinate services.
  2. Preparing merit lists for recruitment based on examination results.
  3. Ensuring adherence to reservation policies as mandated by the government.
  4. Managing advertisements and notifications for available positions.
  5. Overseeing the examination and selection process to maintain fairness and integrity.

== Controversy ==
According to various media reports and public grievances, the Uttarakhand Subordinate Service Selection Commission (UKSSSC) has faced criticism over the years due to certain operational issues. These include:

- Examination Paper Leaks
  - Several recruitment examinations conducted by UKSSSC have been marred by allegations of paper leaks. For instance, in 2022, the commission faced severe backlash when question papers for a Group C recruitment exam were reportedly leaked, leading to widespread protests and cancellation of exams.
- Delay in Recruitment Processes
  - Candidates have frequently raised concerns over delays in conducting exams and declaring results, which hinder timely recruitment. Such delays have also contributed to vacancies remaining unfilled in various government departments.
- Allegations of Corruption
  - Allegations of corruption and favoritism in the recruitment process have occasionally surfaced. Reports claim that certain candidates received unfair advantages due to connections with officials or middlemen.
- Technical Challenges
  - The transition to online application and computer-based testing has exposed technical issues such as website crashes during application periods, lack of robust IT infrastructure, and inadequate support for rural candidates unfamiliar with digital platforms.
- Protests and Legal Interventions
  - Unfair practices and recruitment irregularities have often led to public protests, court cases, and intervention by the Uttarakhand High Court. These instances have sometimes resulted in the cancellation or postponement of exams, further eroding public trust.
- Impact on Aspirants
  - Due to these challenges, aspirants have faced uncertainties and additional financial burdens, as they often need to reapply or reappear for canceled exams.

== See also ==
- Uttarakhand Public Service Commission
- Uttar Pradesh Subordinate Services Selection Commission
