= Multi Tasking Staff Examination =

Indian examination

Multi-Tasking Staff Examination
- Type: Online standardized test
- Skills tested: General knowledge, reasoning, quantitative aptitude, English
- Purpose: recruiting "Group C" posts in government organisations
- Year started: 1975 (51 years ago)
- Duration: 90 minutes (45 minutes each session)
- Score range: 0-270 (120 qualifying only)
- Offered: Annually
- Regions: India
- Languages: English; Hindi
- Annual number of test takers: 5.74 million (2024)
- Prerequisites: 10th passed or equivalent
- Fee: ₹100 (US$1.10)
- Website: https://ssc.gov.in/

Multi Tasking Staff Examination (also known as MTS Exam or MTSE) is an examination conducted by the Staff Selection Commission to recruit Group C (Non Gazetted, non Ministerial) staff to various posts in top ministries, departments and organisations of the Government of India. The Staff Selection Commission was established in 1975. From 2023 in MTS 2022 examination posts of Havildar in CBIC and Narcotics was added.

== Prerequisites ==
Candidates applying for the various posts need to have a matriculation (Secondary Education) certificate from a recognised board at the time of applying. Applicants must be between two age groups 18 and 25 years and 18-27 age group. The age limits may vary depending on the position applied. For instance, the position of Havildar in the Bureau of Narcotics and CBIC originally had an age range from 18 to 25 years. The application fee for 2024 is Rs. 100. All women, people in Scheduled Castes or Scheduled Tribes, Economically Weaker Section, physically disabled people, and ex-servicemen eligible for reservation are exempted from paying the application fee.

== Structure ==
The examination had two major tiers earlier but now it has 2 section test in a single day. The exam is conducted over different days, with results posted after each tier. Previous exams also included a descriptive paper tier.

=== Tier I: Section I ===
The Tier I exam consists of a written objective multiple-choice exam with two sections, covering the subjects of:

- General intelligence and reasoning
- Quantitative aptitude

The exam is typically scored with a maximum of 60 marks per section, for a total of 120 marks. Minimum marks are required to qualify in Section I. Three marks for each correct answer zero marks awarded for each wrong or unattempted questions.

=== Tier I: Section II ===
Section II consists of a multiple-choice exam, in two parts:

- English language and comprehension
- General awareness

Both subjects consist of 60 marks each, for a total of 120 marks. Out of which each question carries 3 marks, each wrong question carries negative one mark and zero mark for unattempted questions. The merit list is prepared on the basis of section 2 marks.

=== Havildar PET/PST Test ===
- Physical endurance test/medical for Havildar

== Logistics ==
The SSC MTS 2024 exam is scheduled to be held from September 30 to November 14, 2024. It will be conducted in multiple batches across several days, with up to three shifts per day. The SSC MTS 2024 exam has received a significant number of applicants, with over 9.5 lakh candidates expected to participate.

Candidates were allowed to view their answer sheets and point out errors in the grading of answers for a fee of Rs. 100 per question.

For the 2024 exam, approximately 9.5 lakh candidates filled in the online application. Out of these, a large number are expected to take the exam, which will be conducted across multiple batches.
