= N K Raghupathy =

Indian civil servant

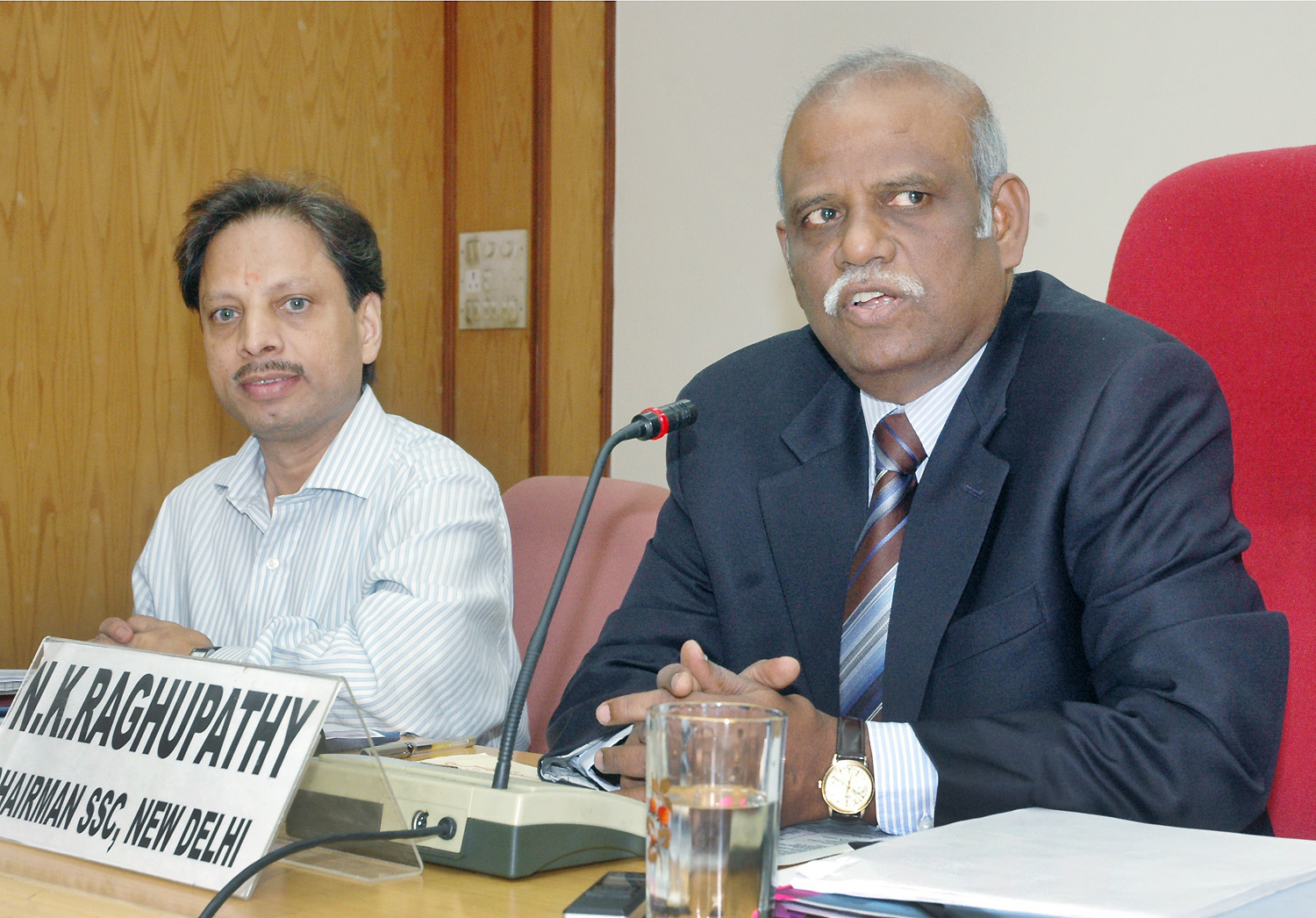
N K Raghupathy in 2011

N K Raghupathy is an Indian Administrative Service Officer from the 1975 cadre. He retired from Indian Administrative Service in 2013. With 40 years of service, teaching and research, he worked in West Bengal Secretariat and Government of India secretariat and finally as chairman of the Staff Selection Commission from 2009 to 2013.
