= Haryana Staff Selection Commission =

Indian state organisation

- Logo
- Abbreviation: HSSC
- Formation: 28 January 1970
- Founded at: Haryana
- Type: Recruitment Agency: Group C & D Services
- Legal status: Active
- Headquarters: Panchkula
- Chairman: Sh. Himmat Singh
- Members: 1. Sh.Kapil Atreja; 2. Sh. Amarnath Sauda; 3. Sh. Kawaljeet Saini; 4. Sh. Vikas Dahiya
- Website: Official website

Haryana Staff Selection Commission (HSSC) (Earlier Subordinate Services Selection Board) is an organisation under Government of Haryana to recruit staff for various posts of Group B, C, D in the various Departments of the Government of Haryana and in the subordinate offices. HSSC was established on 28 January 1970 in Haryana.

The Organization recruits the candidates to fill the posts under State Police, Town Improvement, Trust, Zila Parishad or Panchayat Samiti, Municipality, Municipal Corporation and under State Govt. Local bodies or Cooperative Institutions.

The Secretary of Haryana Staff Selection Commission changes from August 2022 Now IRPS officer Sh. Vinay Kumar is new secretary of HSSC and Sh. Daljit Singh is new Controller of Exams.
