= Maharashtra State Council of Examinations =

Indian state authority

The Maharashtra State Council of Examinations (MSCE) is an Indian state level authority that facilitates Scholarship examinations.

== High School Scholarship Exam ==
High School Scholarship Exam is a state level scholarship exam conducted by Maharashtra State Council of Education (MSCE) in India to identify students having academic talent at secondary schooling and to encourage deserving students and provide them with financial support. These exams are conducted since the year 1954. These exams are held for students pursuing 5th Standard and 8th Standard Class in Secondary or High Schools in Maharashtra. Earlier only few selected students from each school were able to appear for these tests but from the year 2008 any student from a Government recognized school is eligible to appear for the exam. The exams are conducted every year in the month of February or March and over 5.5 lakh of 5th standard and over 6.5 lakh of 8th standard students appear for this exam. The exam can be given in both English and Marathi mediums.

=== Pattern of examination ===
Scholarship Paper has 2 papers of 150 marks each. Each paper has duration of 1 hour 30 Mins .

The Papers Are:

- (First Language And Maths )
- (Third Language And Intelligence Test )

Each Paper Have 75 Question Which Has 150 Marks

=== Syllabus ===
The syllabus for all subjects is same as that of the syllabus in the regular curriculum of 7th Standard.

For 5th Scholarship there is Study Of Standard 5th, 6th And 7th and 8th Scholarship Was Syllabus Of Standard 8th, 9th and 10th.

=== Rewards ===
The scholarships are awarded on the basis of objective examinations consisting of 3 papers. Based on the performance in these examinations a merit list is prepared and scholarships in the form of certain amounts decided by the Education Council are awarded to the top students.
