= Jammu and Kashmir Services Selection Board =

Recruitment agency of the government of Jammu and Kashmir

Jammu and Kashmir Services Selection Board (JKSSB)
- Acronym: JKSSB
- Type: Paper pen mode test
- Purpose: Conducts various entrance examinations to various non-gazette posts
- Year started: 1992
- Regions: Jammu and Kashmir
- Languages: English
- Website: jkssb.nic.in

Jammu and Kashmir Services Selection Board (JKSSB) is a service recruiting board constituted by the Government of Jammu and Kashmir that conducts examinations to various departmental services or non-gazette posts in the union territory of Jammu and Kashmir. The board has been constituted in exercise of powers conferred by Provision of Section 124 of the Constitution of Jammu and Kashmir in accordance with Section 15 of J&K Civil Services Decentralization and Recruitment Act 2010.

== Background ==
The Jammu and Kashmir Service Selection Board is the only constitutional body to conduct all the entrance examinations for all the non-gazette vacancies in the UT. Its headquarters are located in the Ram Bagh area of Srinagar city, 190009. The agency is headed by its chairman, who is responsible for the recruitment process, JKSSB policy formulation, and its implementation. The agency chairman and other members are appointed by the lieutenant governor. The LG has the right to determine the number of members as well as the members of the commission and their terms of service.

== Members ==
The commission consists of five members, including a chairman who holds different positions for specific roles.

Name	Position
Indu Kanwal Chib, JKAS	Chairman
Ghulam Hassan Sheikh, JKAS	Member
Peerzada Zahoor Ahmad, JKAS	Member
Amit Vermani, JKAS	Member
Atul Kumar, JKAS	Member
