= West Bengal Board of Primary Education =

Board of Primary Education of India

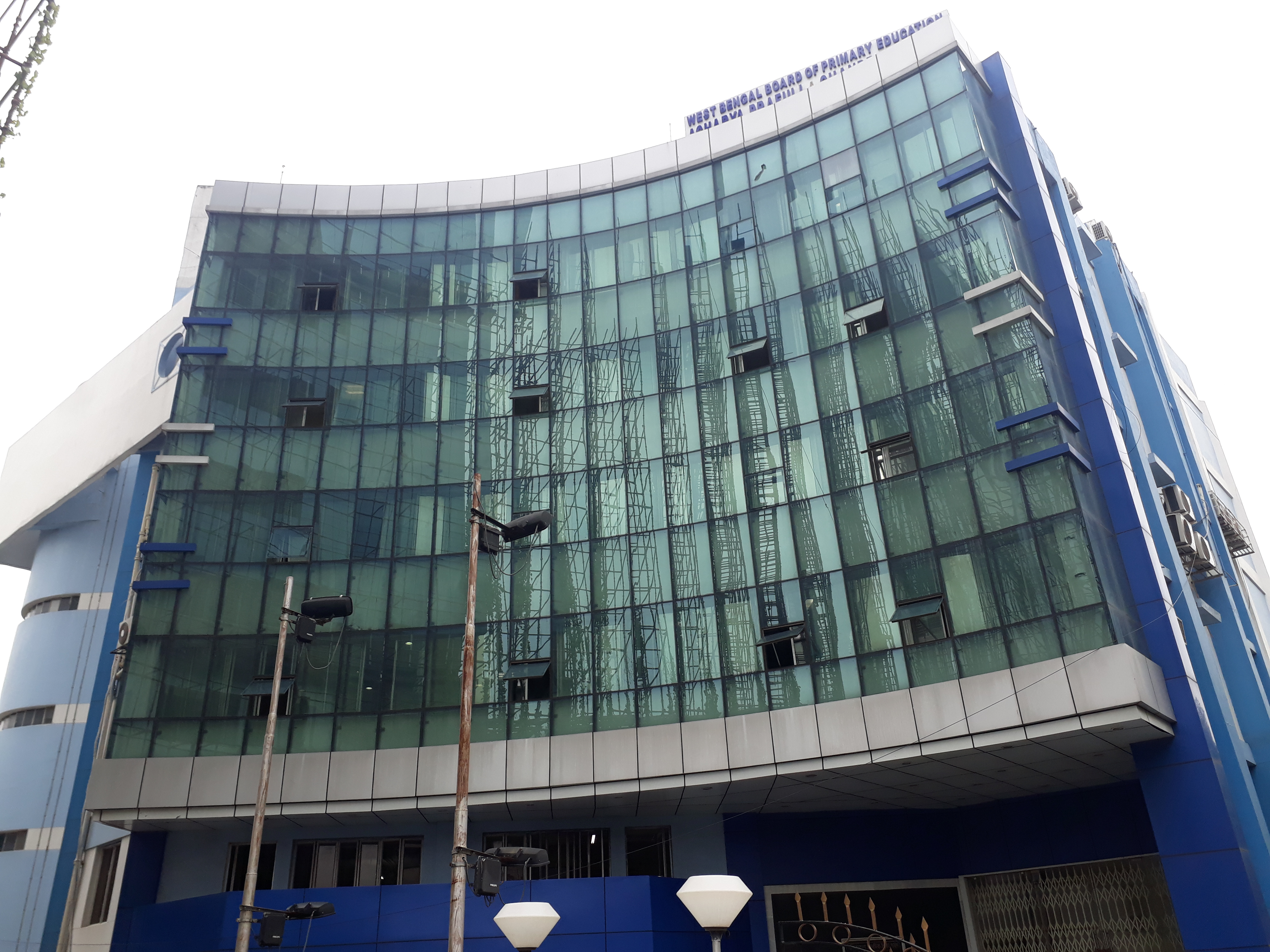
- Office of the West Bengal Board of Primary Education
- Abbreviation: WBBPE
- Established: 1st January 1975; 51 years ago
- Type: Governmental Organisation
- Headquarters: DK 7/1, Sector II, Salt Lake, Kolkata, West Bengal, India - 700091
- President: Goutam Paul
- Website: www.wbbpe.wb.gov.in

West Bengal Board of Primary Education is the state government administered autonomous authority for overseeing primary education in West Bengal, India.

West Bengal Board of Primary Education conducts West Bengal Primary Teacher Eligibility Test (TET).

== See also ==
- Department of School Education (West Bengal)
- West Bengal Board of Secondary Education
