= Uttar Pradesh Subordinate Services Selection Commission =

State government commission conducting examinations and recruitment

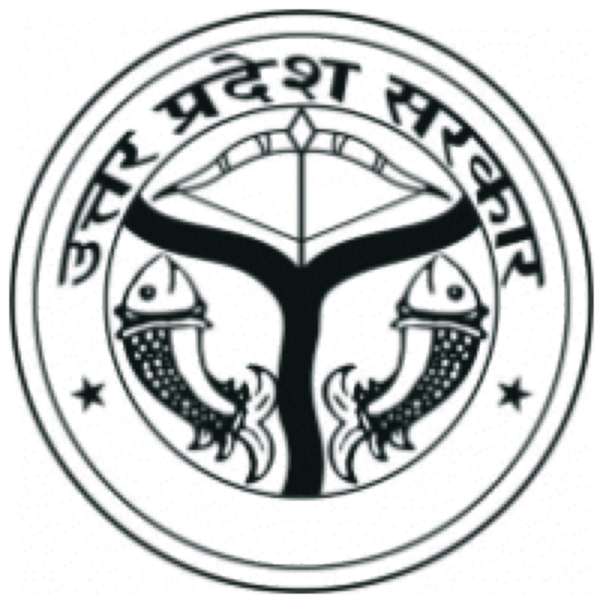
- Abbreviation: UPSSSC
- Formation: November 1999
- Type: Government agency
- Location(s): 3rd Floor, Pickup Bhawan, Vibhuti Khand, Gomtinagar, Lucknow, Uttar Pradesh–226010
- Region served: Uttar Pradesh
- Services: Recruitment
- Chief Executive Officer: Santosh Kumar, IAS
- Website: Official website

The Uttar Pradesh Subordinate Services Selection Commission (UPSSSC) is a government body of the state of Uttar Pradesh, India, authorized to conduct examinations for appointments to various Group C and Group D posts under the Government of Uttar Pradesh. The Uttar Pradesh Subordinate Services Selection Commission was constituted under the provisions of the U.P. Subordinate Services Selection Commission Act 2014 (often shortened to UPSSSC Act 2014). The current commission was formed after it was recognised that there was a need for a recruitment drive to attract people to Group C and Group D positions.

== Functions of UPSSSC ==
- Recruitment of the candidates.
1. On the basis of interview only
2. On the basis of examination only
3. On the basis of examination and interview only
4. On the basis of screening test and interview (if needed)
5. On the basis of preliminary examination, main examination and interview (if needed)

== Examinations conducted by the Commission ==
The following examinations are conducted by the U.P. Subordinate Services Selection Commission from time to time:

1. Junior Assistant Examination.
2. Bus and Transport Conductor Examination
3. Clerk, Junior Assistant, Stenographer Examination.
4. Forest Guard Examination.
5. Boring Technician
6. Lekhpal, Patwari and Ameen Examinations.
7. Pharmacist (Medical)
8. Revenue Inspector Examination
9. Junior Engineer Examination
10. Village Development Officer/ Village Panchayat Officer, Samaj Kalyan Paryavekshak Examination.
11. Driver, Peon and Multitasking Staff Recruitment Exam
12. Tubewell Operator
13. Lower Subordinate Services
14. Cane Supervisor
15. Computer Operator
16. Assistant Statistical officer
17. Tyre Inspector/Vidutkar/Mechanic Examination.
18. Yuva Vikas dal Adhikari and Sports Trainer Examination.
19. Wild Life Guard
20. Assistant Accountant & Auditor Examination
21. Preliminary Eligibility Test (PET)

== See also ==
- Uttar Pradesh Public Service Commission
- List of Public service commissions in India
