= Madhya Pradesh Employees Selection Board =

Government agency

- मध्य प्रदेश कर्मचारी चयन मंडल
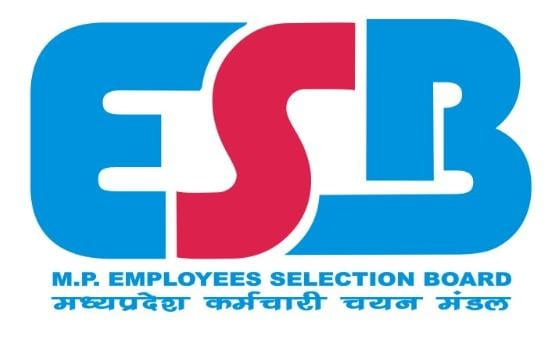
- Madhya Pradesh Employees Selection Board
- Abbreviation: MPESB
- Predecessor: Vyapam and Madhya Pradesh Professional Examination Board
- Successor: Madhya Pradesh Employees Selection Board
- Formation: 1970
- Founder: Government of Madhya Pradesh
- Founded at: Bhopal Madhya Pradesh
- Type: Employees Selection Board
- Legal status: Employees Recruitment
- Headquarters: Bhopal, MP, India
- Location: Madhya Pradesh, India
- Official language: Hindi, English
- Owner: Government of Madhya Pradesh
- Chairman: Shri Malay Shrivastava IAS
- Key people: Shanmuga Priya Mishra IAS, Director
- Parent organization: Government of Madhya Pradesh
- Formerly called: Vyapam and Madhya Pradesh Professional Examination Board

The Madhya Pradesh Employees Selection Board (MPESB), previously the Madhya Pradesh Professional Examination Board and commonly known as Vyapam (an abbreviation of its Hindi name Madhya Pradesh Vyavsayik Pariksha Mandal), is a government agency of Madhya Pradesh, India. It conducts various tests for admission to professional courses and streams. It is the largest examination conducting body of Madhya Pradesh government and comes directly under the Directorate of Technical Education (Government of Madhya Pradesh). The Madhya Pradesh Employees Selection Board is a self-financed, autonomous incorporated body of State Govt. The Government has re-constituted the Board of Directors for taking decisions on policy and organizational matters through Madhya Pradesh Employees Selection Board Act 2020.

The agency made national news for the Vyapam scam, a massive admission and recruitment scam involving politicians, senior officials and businessmen. After the scam was unearthed, 2,000 people were arrested, including the state's former education minister, Laxmikant Sharma, and Vyapam exam controller Pankaj Trivedi.

== History ==
=== Early history ===
The Madhya Pradesh Professional Examination Board was initially established as the Pre Medical Test Board in 1970. In 1981, the Pre Engineering Board was constituted, and the agencies were merged by order on 17 April 1982 into the Professional Examination Board, which was assigned the responsibility of conducting entrance tests for admission to various colleges in the state.

=== Vyapam scam ===
In 2013, a major scheme to manipulate the results of examinations conducted by the Professional Examination Board was unearthed by state police. That July, Indore Police arrested 20 people who took the medical entrance examination on behalf of others. In 2015, the case was transferred to the Central Bureau of Investigation, which accused 3,500 people in 154 proceedings.

=== Renaming ===
In 2022, the agency was renamed the Employees Selection Board (Hindi: Karamchari Chayan Board) and moved under the responsibility of the state's General Administration Department. The change in name had been pending since 2015.

== Examinations conducted ==
The Employees Selection Board conducts the following examinations:

- Pre-Polytechnic Test
- Pre-Architecture Test
- Pre-Agriculture Test
- Pre-P.G. Entrance Test
- Pre-M.C.A. Entrance Test
- Management Entrance Test
- Pre-General Nursing Talent Search Test
- B.A., L.L.B. (Hons) Entrance Test
- Pre-BEd Examination
- MPSLET Test
- Police Recruitment Test
- Typing paper Hindi
- Accountant
- Auditor
- General Nursing Training Selection Test (GNTST)
- Pre Nursing Selection test (PNST)
- Pre-veterinary and Fisheries Test (PV & FT)
- Forest Guard
