= Staff Selection Commission exam controversies =

Scam in India

- Date: 2016–present (as of 2026)
- Location: India
- Type: Scandal
- Target: Students

The Staff Selection Commission exam controversies are an alleged paper leak scandal in India, first reported by the media in 2018. The alleged scam was popularized when several students reported a large scale paper leak, unfair assessment after normalisation and other misgivings. The Staff Selection Commission (SSC) director rejected these claims, but the Central Bureau of Investigation has made arrests as the case continues.

== 2025 SSC protest and controversy ==
In July 2025, the SSC faced criticism from educators following changes in its examinations. These reportedly led to confusion and dissatisfaction among candidates preparing for government recruitment through SSC.

On 31 July 2025, a delegation of teachers and SSC aspirants gathered in New Delhi to meet the SSC chairperson and raise concerns about mismanagement. The chairperson agreed to address the issues but later reversed the decision. This led to an escalation, and the Delhi Police intervened, using lathi charge to disperse the protest. Several teachers and students were injured during the incident, and multiple detentions were made. First Information Reports were filed against some protesters. The protest was widely shared on social media, with slogans such as "Staff Selection Commission seems like a commission with zero accountability" gaining traction.

The incident triggered concern regarding transparency and governance within the SSC. Various student groups and educators have continued to demand accountability and reform.

== Paper leaks ==
The SSC exams are the only government exams with significant paper leak cases; since 2016, a paper leak case has arisen every two to three years. In late July 2025, screenshots of an alleged paper leak for SSC CGL Tier-2 sparked nationwide protests.
