= Madhya Pradesh Public Service Commission =

State government agency

- मध्य प्रदेश लोक सेवा आयोग; MPPSC

Constitutional body overview
- Formed: 1 November 1956; 69 years ago
- Jurisdiction: Government of Madhya Pradesh
- Headquarters: Indore, Madhya Pradesh
- Motto: सत्यमेव जयते
- Constitutional body executive: RajeshLal Mehra, (Chairman) Prabal Sipaha (IAS) (Secretary) Rakhi Sahay (IAS)(Deputy Secretary) Chandrashekhar Raikwar (Member) Prof. Krishnakant Sharma(Member) Prof. Narendra Kumar Koshti(Member)
- Parent department: Government of Madhya Pradesh
- Parent Constitutional body: General Administrative Department (GAD)
- Child Constitutional body: RCVP Noronha Academy of Administration
- Website: mppsc.mp.gov.in//

The Madhya Pradesh Public Service Commission (MPPSC) is a government body of the state of Madhya Pradesh, established by the provisions of the Constitution of India, responsible for recruiting candidates for various state government jobs through competitive examinations.

== History ==
The history of MPPSC begins with the former state commission Madhya Bharat Commission which was working from 1954-1956. Following the reorganization of Madhya Pradesh state, the new commission came into existence on 1 November 1956 under the Article 315 of the Constitution and Section 118 (3) of States Reorganisation Act, 1956.

== Functions ==
The functions and duties of the commission are amended under the Forty-first Amendment of the Constitution of India, Article 335 and 376 which grants the commission permission to perform specific functions in the state.

- To make direct recruitments of government servants in the state.
- To make promotions of the state-level officers in any department.
- To make transfers in civil and departmental services from one department to another.

.

== State Services Examination (SSE) ==
The State Services Examination (SSE) is a prestigious competitive exam conducted by the Madhya Pradesh Public Service Commission (MPPSC) for the recruitment of officers to various administrative positions in the state of Madhya Pradesh. The exam is held annually and is considered one of the most important exams for candidates seeking government jobs in the state.

The SSE exam consists of three stages:

- Preliminary Examination: This is the first stage of the exam and consists of multiple-choice questions (MCQs) covering General Studies, General Aptitude, and relevant subjects.
- Mains Examination: Candidates who qualify the preliminary exam are eligible to appear for the mains examination, which is a written test. The Mains exam is usually subjective and tests the candidates' knowledge in various subjects, including General Studies, General Hindi, and specific subjects based on the candidate's choice.
- Interview/Personality Test: The final stage of the exam is the interview, where candidates are assessed on their personality, communication skills, and suitability for the administrative roles.

== Commission profile ==
The Commission is headed by a Chairman, Secretary and other members for the specific roles.

Name	Designation
Dr. Rajesh Lal Mehra	Chairman
Prabal Sipaha IAS	Secretary
Rakhi Sahay IAS	Deputy Secretary
Shri Chandrashekhar Raikwar	Member
Prof. Krishnakant Sharma	Member
Prof. Narendra Kumar Koshti	Member

== See also ==
- List of Public service commissions in India
- Documentary Film "pradipti " by MPPSC
