= Railway Recruitment Control Board =

Public recruitment body in India

- Abbreviation: RRCB
- Formation: 27 April 1998; 28 years ago
- Type: Governmental
- Headquarters: Rail Bhavan
- Location: New Delhi, India
- Region served: India
- Parent organization: Railway Board
- Subsidiaries: RRB (21)
- Website: rrcb.gov.in

The Railway Recruitment Control Board (RRCB) is a government body established in 1998 under the Ministry of Railways (Railway Board), Government of India. It is responsible for coordinating and monitoring the activities of the Railway Recruitment Boards (RRBs), which conduct recruitment for Group C posts in Indian Railways. Currently, there are 21 RRBs located across various cities.

== History ==
In July 1942, a Service Commission with a chairman and two members was established to recruit subordinate staff on the North Western Railway. In 1945, additional Service Commissions were set up in Bombay, Calcutta, Madras, and Lucknow, tasked with recruiting Class III staff and advising General Managers on appeals related to disciplinary matters. In 1948, the Indian Railway Enquiry Committee recommended making these commissions permanent while withdrawing their role in appeals to focus solely on recruitment. The chairman of Bombay Service Commission was designated to supervise others.

However, financial constraints in 1949 led to the consolidation of all commissions into a single entity in Bombay. With improved economic conditions in 1953-54, four commissions were again set up in Bombay, Madras, Allahabad, and Calcutta. To cater to the needs of other regions, additional commissions were later established: Muzaffarpur (1973), Secunderabad (1978), Guwahati (1978), Bangalore (1980), and Danapur (1981). Seven more were added in 1983, including Ahmedabad, Ajmer, Bhopal, Bhubaneswar, Chandigarh, Jammu, Srinagar, and Trivandrum, followed by Malda and Gorakhpur in 1984. In the same year, Ranchi commission was set up exclusively for Scheduled Tribes.

In January 1985, the Service Commissions were renamed Railway Recruitment Boards (RRBs). By 1998, all RRBs were brought under the newly formed Railway Recruitment Control Board (RRCB) under the Ministry of Railways.

== Objectives ==
- Formulation of policy in regard to recruitment procedures.
- To monitor the activities of all Railway Recruitment Boards (RRBs) including expenditure incurred for recruitment.
- To evaluate the performance of RRB's and advise them on priorities as required.
- To organise a management information system for monitoring work done by RRB's.

== Railway Recruitment Boards ==
There are 21 Railway Recruiting Boards across various cities in India:

- Ahmedabad
- Ajmer
- Prayagraj
- Bangalore
- Bhopal
- Bhubaneswar
- Bilaspur
- Chandigarh
- Chennai
- Gorakhpur
- Guwahati
- Jammu and Kashmir
- Kolkata
- Malda
- Mumbai
- Muzaffarpur
- Patna
- Ranchi
- Secunderabad
- Siliguri
- Thiruvananthapuram

== Posts ==
The 21 RRBs under RRCB conduct recruitment to Group C posts in Railway Board.

- ALP and Technician: Railway Recruitment Board (RRB) conducts computer based examination for recruitment of ALP & Technician posts.
- Non-Technical Popular Categories (NTPC): Commercial apprentice, Goods guard, Traffic Apprentice, Traffic Assistant, Assistant Station Master, etc. all over India.
- Junior Engineer (JE): Junior Engineer (Information Technology), Depot Material Superintendent (DMS) and Chemical & Metallurgical Assistant (CMA).

== See also ==
- Union Public Service Commission
- List of Public service commissions in India
