= Institute of Banking Personnel Selection =

Indian government agency

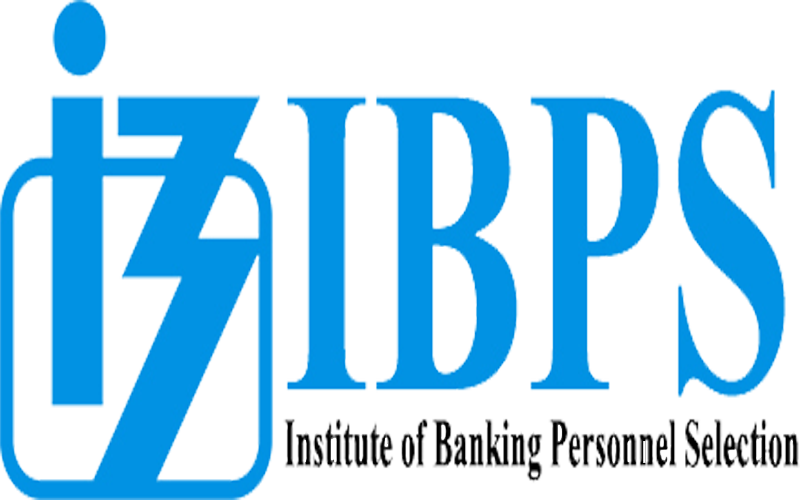
- Institute of Banking Personnel Selection (IBPS)
- Abbreviation: IBPS
- Formation: 19 December 1975; 50 years ago
- Type: Central Recruitment Agency
- Purpose: Recruitment of Government Bankers
- Headquarters: Mumbai, India
- Region served: India
- Official language: English and Hindi
- Chairman: Shri Rajneesh Karnatak
- Director: Shri Harideesh Kumar B
- Parent organization: Ministry of Finance, Government of India
- Website: www.ibps.in

The Institute of Banking Personnel Selection (IBPS) is a central recruitment agency operating under the ownership of the Ministry of Finance in the Government of India that was started with an aim to encourage the recruitment and placement of young undergraduates, postgraduates and doctorates at the rank of Group 'A' officer, Group 'B' officer, Group 'C' employee and Group 'D' employee in nationalised banks and Regional rural banks in India. It also provides standardised systems for assessment and result processing services to organisations.

== History ==
After nationalisation of banks in India in 1969, Indian banks needed to expand their branch network across the country so that they were more accessible to their customers. This required more staff but recruitment through methods such as advertising was unsatisfactory. Thus, the banks asked the National Institute of Bank Management (NIBM) to design a selection testing process through which they could hire proficient candidates. And as a result, in 1984, following several years of operation, PSS underwent transformation and evolved into the Institute of Banking Personnel Selection (IBPS). This transformation marked a significant step in streamlining and centralizing the recruitment process for various positions within the banking sector.

IBPS currently functions as an autonomous body that is mainly engaged in conducting competitive exams for recruitment to clerical and officers' posts in the banking sector.

Earlier, candidates had to write multiple exams conducted by each bank for their vacancies. But from 2012, the Recruitment process has been changed. Now IBPS conducts four different recruitment processes namely CRP PO/MT, CRP RRBs, CRP Clerical, CRP Specialist Officers under which various exams take place every year for banking sector recruitment. The exams conducted by IBPS are as follows:

- IBPS PO/MT exam takes place for the recruitment of Probationary Officers and Management Trainees' in the participating banks, which are national public sector banks.
- IBPS SO exam takes place for the recruitment of Specialist Officers, which are Scale-I officers in the national public sector banks.
- IBPS Clerk exam takes place for the recruitment of clerks in the national public sector banks.
- IBPS RRB Officer Scale-I exam takes place for the recruitment of Scale-I Officers in Regional Rural Banks, this post is equivalent to Probationary Officers post in National Public Sector Banks.
- IBPS RRB Office Assistant exam takes place for the recruitment of Office Assistant in Regional Rural Banks, this post is equivalent to Clerk post in National Public Sector Banks.
- IBPS RRB Officer Scale-II and Scale-III exam takes place for the recruitment of Scale-II and Scale-III Officers in Regional Rural Banks, the post of Officer Scale-II is equivalent to Specialist Officer post and Officer Scale-III post is equivalent to Senior Manager in National Public Sector Banks.

== Governance ==
IBPS is governed by a board that includes nominees from government organisations such as the Reserve Bank of India, Ministry of Finance, Government of India, Indian Institute of Technology Mumbai, Indian Institute of Banking and Finance, National Institute of Bank Management, Indian Banks' Association and the government owned banks.

== Services ==
IBPS offers its services to banks in the government and private sectors, regional rural banks, and foreign banks. It also serves other financial institutions, including co-operative banks, insurance companies, academic institutions, and both private and state-owned companies.

The services are:

- Project consultation: assistance in conducting examinations for recruitment and promotion
- Assessment centres that help organisations in identifying the knowledge and skills of applicants for the suitable positions
- Personality assessments using group exercises and interviews to identify the candidates’ higher cognitive skills
- Training programmes for senior staff to help develop their observational and interviewing skills
- Workshops for people who design their own question papers
- Lists of experts who can conduct interviews or group exercises effectively
