= Staff Selection Commission =

Government of India agency responsible for recruitment of staffs

- कर्मचारी चयन आयोग
- Abbreviation: SSC
- Predecessor: Subordinate Services Commission
- Formation: 4 November 1975; 50 years ago
- Type: Government
- Purpose: to recruit personnel for Group C (Non-technical) and Group B (Non-Gazetted) posts.
- Headquarters: New Delhi, India
- Location: Block No: 12, Lodhi Rd, CGO Complex, Lodhi Colony, New Delhi, 110003
- Region served: India
- Services: Group B ,C Services and group D in India
- Chairman: Shri S. Gopalakrishnan, IAS
- Parent organization: Department of Personnel and Training
- Affiliations: Government of India
- Budget: ₹426.72 crore (US$50 million) (2021–22)
- Staff: 541
- Website: ssc.gov.in

The Staff Selection Commission (SSC) is an organisation under the Government of India to recruit staff for various posts in the various ministries and departments of the government of India and in subordinate offices and agencies.

This commission is an attached office of the Department of Personnel and Training (DoPT) which consists of chairman, two members and a secretary-cum-controller of examinations. His post is equivalent to the level of additional secretary to the government of India.

The SSC decided to conduct the Multi-Tasking (Non-Technical) Staff examination in 13 Indian languages, which are Urdu, Tamil, Malayalam, Telugu, Kannada, Assamese, Bengali, Gujarati, Konkani, Meitei (Manipuri), Marathi, Odia and Punjabi, in addition to Hindi and English, out of the 22 official languages of the Indian Republic, for the first time in January 2023.

== History ==
The estimates committee in the parliament recommended the setting up of a Service Selection Commission in its 47th report (1967–68) for conducting examinations to recruit lower categories of posts. Later, in the Department of Personnel and Administrative Reforms, on 4 November 1975 government of India constituted a commission called Subordinate Service Commission. On 26 September 1977, the Subordinate Services Commission was renamed as Staff Selection Commission. The functions of the Staff Selection Commission were redefined by the government of India through Ministry of Personnel, Public Grievances and on 21 May 1999. Then the new constitution and functions of the Staff Selection Commission came into effect from 1 June 1999. Every year conducts the Combined Graduate Level Examination for recruiting non-gazetted officers to various government jobs.

== Personnel ==
The commission is headed by a Chairman and two members after him. Besides, there are one Secretary, one Director, one Deputy Secretary, two Joint Directors, nine Under Secretaries, four Deputy Directors, one Finance & Budget Officer, one Assistant Director (OL), 24 Section Officers and more than 183 supporting officers/staff are at the Headquarters for discharging the duties and responsibilities of the Commission

=== List of Chairmen ===
The following is the list of Chairmen of the Staff Selection Commission since its inception in 1976.

No.	Name	From	To
1	Shri Saiyid Hamid	1 July 1976	16 June 1980
2	Smt. Inderjit Kaur	10 July 1980	10 July 1985
3	Shri S.C. Mittal	23 July 1985	23 July 1990
4	Shri S.N. Bajpe	23 July 1990	12 July 1994
5	Shri B. Sankaran	28 November 1994	9 November 1998
6	Shri K.M. Lal	11 January 1999	21 June 2002
7	Shri B.K. Misra	24 June 2002	19 October 2004
8	Shri Prakash Chander*	20 December 2004	23 November 2005
9	Shri I.M.G. Khan**	28 November 2005	12 January 2006
10	Shri Brahm Dutt**	13 January 2006	30 October 2006
11	Dr. (Smt.) C. T. Misra	30 October 2006	27 October 2008
12	Smt. Vibha Puri Das**	29 October 2008	23 April 2009
13	Shri N.K. Raghupathy	24 April 2009	2 March 2013
14	Shri A. Bhattacharyya	20 March 2013	2 December 2015
15	Shri Ashim Khurana	9 December 2015	30 September 2019
16	Smt. Sujata Chaturvedi**	4 October 2019	23 October 2019
17	Shri Braj Raj Sharma	24 October 2019	1 May 2020
18	Smt. Sujata Chaturvedi**	23 May 2020	30 June 2021
19	Smt. Deepti Umashankar**	1 July 2021	11 February 2022
20	Shri S. Kishore	10 February 2022	30 April 2024
21	Shri Pradeep Singh Khorla**	1 May 2024	29 May 2024
22	Shri Rakesh Ranjan	29 May 2024	incumbent

Notes: * Acting Chairman; ** Additional Charge

== Headquarters ==
Staff Selection Commission has its headquarters located at CGO Complex in New Delhi. At present, it has seven Regional offices at Prayagraj, Mumbai, Kolkata, Guwahati, Chennai, Bangalore and New Delhi. It also has two Sub-regional offices at Raipur and Chandigarh.

Each regional office is headed by a Regional Director and each Sub-Regional office is headed by a Deputy Director.

=== Regional Offices ===
Region	Headquarter	Jurisdiction	Website
Central Region	Prayagraj	Bihar, Uttar Pradesh	www.ssc-cr.org
Eastern Region	Kolkata	Andaman and Nicobar Islands (UT), Jharkhand, Odisha, Sikkim, West Bengal	www.sscer.org
KKR Region	Bengaluru	Karnataka, Kerala, Lakshadweep (UT)	www.ssckkr.kar.nic.in
MPR Region	Raipur	Chhattisgarh, Madhya Pradesh	www.sscmpr.org
Northern Region	New Delhi	Delhi, Rajasthan, Uttarakhand	www.sscnr.nic.in
North East Region	Guwahati	Arunachal Pradesh, Assam, Manipur, Meghalaya, Mizoram, Nagaland, Tripura	www.sscner.org.in
North West Region	Chandigarh	Chandigarh, Haryana, Himachal Pradesh, Jammu & Kashmir (UT), Ladakh (UT), Punjab	www.sscnwr.org
Southern Region	Chennai	Andhra Pradesh, Telangana, Tamil Nadu and Puducherry (UT)	www.sscsr.gov.in
Western Region	Mumbai	Goa, Gujarat, Maharashtra, Dadra and Nagar Haveli and Daman and Diu (UT)	www.sscwr.net

== Functions ==
The Function of the commission are as follows:

1. To make Recruitment to (i) all Group 'B' Posts in the various Ministries/Departments of the Govt. of India and their Attached and Subordinate Offices which are in the pay scales the maximum of which is Rs.10,500 or below and (ii) all non-technical Group 'C' posts in the various Ministries/Departments of the Govt. of India and their Attached and Subordinate Offices, except those posts which are specifically exempt from the purview of the Staff Selection Commission.
2. To conduct examinations and/or interviews, whenever required for recruitment to the posts within its purview. The examinations would be held as far as possible at different centres and successful candidates posted, to the extent possible, to their home State/Region.
3. To hold Open Competitive Examinations for recruitment to the posts of:
  1. Lower Division Clerks in the various Ministries/Departments, Attached and Subordinate Offices of the Government of India
  2. Grade 'C' and Grade 'D' Stenographers
  3. Assistants in the various Ministries/Departments including Attached and Subordinate Offices of the Government of India
  4. Inspectors of Central Excise in different Collectorates of Central Excise, Inspectors of Income-Tax in different charges of the Commissioners of Income-Tax, Preventive Officers and Examiners in different Custom Houses, Assistant Enforcement Officers in Directorate of Enforcement;
  5. Sub-Inspectors in Central Bureau of Investigation and Central Police Organisations;
  6. Divisional Accountants, Auditors and Accountants under the Office of Comptroller and Auditor General of India and other Accounts Departments and Upper Division Clerks in Attached and Subordinate Offices of the Government of India.
  7. Junior Engineer (Civil & Electrical) in CPWD
  8. Statistical Investigators, Grade IV of Subordinate Statistical Service (SSC)
  9. Tax Assistant (a Group C non – Gazetted)
  10. Section Officers in various Departments
4. The Commission also holds Departmental Examination for promotion from:
  1. Group 'D' to Lower Division Clerk Grade
  2. Lower Divisional Clerks to Upper Divisional Clerks
  3. Stenographers Grade 'D' to Stenographers Grade 'C'
5. The Commission prepares schemes for recruitment to all Group 'B' posts which are in the pay scale of Rs 9300 to 34800 with a grade pay of Rs 42000 or below and Group 'C' non-technical posts
6. The Commission conducts examinations/selections for recruitment to all Group 'B' posts which are in the pay scales the maximum of which is Rs.10, 500 or below and all Group 'C' non-technical posts
7. The Commission performs such other functions as may be entrusted to it by the Central Govt. from time to time.

== Exams conducted by SSC ==
Staff Selection Commission currently functions as a subordinate office of DOPT and is mainly engaged in conducting competitive exams for recruitment to various posts in the Staff Selection Commission departments, organizations. In the previous years, Staff Selection Commission has conducted various exams as given below

- SSC Combined Graduate Level (SSC CGL)
- SSC Combined Higher Secondary Level (SSC CHSL)
- SSC Stenographer C & D (SSC Stenographer)
- SSC Multitasking Staff (SSC MTS)
- SSC Junior Engineer (SSC JE)
- SSC Junior Hindi Translator (SSC JHT)
- SSC General Duty Constable (SSC GD)
- SSC Central Police Organization & SI (SSC CPO)
- SSC Selection Post

== See also ==
- List of Public service commissions in India
