= Provincial Civil Service (Uttar Pradesh) =

Administrative civil service under the State government of Uttar Pradesh

Provincial Civil Service Prāntīya Sivila Sevā
Service Overview
- Founded: 1 April 1937
- State: Uttar Pradesh
- Staff College: U.P. Academy of Administration and Management, Lucknow, Uttar Pradesh
- Cadre Controlling Authority: Department of Appointment and Personnel, Government of Uttar Pradesh
- Minister Responsible: Yogi Adityanath, Chief Minister of Uttar Pradesh and Minister of Appointment and Personnel
- Legal personality: Governmental: Civil service
- Current Cadre Strength: 1112 members (556 officers directly recruited by UP-PSC as deputy collectors and 556 officers promoted from Tehsildars)
- Selection: State Civil Services Examination
- Association: Uttar Pradesh PCS Association

Head of the State Civil Services
- Chief Secretary: Durga Shanker Misra, IAS
- Additional Chief Secretary (DoAP): Devesh Chaturvedi, IAS

Provincial Civil Service / Provincial Civil Service (Executive Branch) (IAST: Prāntīya Sivila Sevā), often abbreviated to as PCS, is the administrative civil service of the Government of Uttar Pradesh comprising Group A and Group B posts. It is also the feeder service for Indian Administrative Service in the state.

PCS officers hold various posts at sub-divisional, district, divisional and state level from conducting revenue administration and maintenance of law and order. The Department of Appointment and Personnel of the Government of Uttar Pradesh is the cadre-controlling authority of the service. Along with the Provincial Police Service (PPS) and the Provincial Forest Service (PFS), the PCS is one of the three feeder services to its respective All India Services.

== Recruitment ==
Half of the recruitment to the service is made on the basis of an annual competitive examination conducted by Uttar Pradesh Public Service Commission called as direct PCS officers as they are directly appointed at Deputy Collector rank. Half of the total strength of PCS officers is filled by promotion from Uttar Pradesh Lower Provincial Civil Service (Tehsildar cadre) who are known as promotee PCS officers. PCS officers, regardless of their mode of entry, are appointed by the Governor of Uttar Pradesh.

== Responsibilities of PCS officer ==
The typical functions performed by a PCS officer are:

- To collect land revenue and function as courts in matters of revenue and crime (revenue courts and criminal courts of executive magistrate), to maintain law and order, to implement Union and State Government policies at the grass-root level when posted at field positions i.e. as sub-divisional magistrate, additional city magistrate, city magistrate, additional district magistrate and additional divisional commissioner. And to act as the agent of the government on the field, i.e. to act as the intermediate between public and the government.
- To handle the administration and daily proceedings of the government, including formulation and implementation of policy in consultation with the minister-in-charge, additional chief secretary/principal secretary and secretary of the concerned department.

== Career progression ==
After completing their training, a PCS officer generally serves as Sub Divisional Magistrates (SDMs). Sometimes, there can be more deputy collectors in the district than the total subdivisions, hence they are also posted as Additional City Magistrate, Sub Divisional Magistrate (Judicial), Additional Sub Divisional Magistrate, Deputy Collector (Revenue).

After five years of service promoted as City Magistrate, an assignment which lasts between three and four years. They can also posted as Special Land Acquisition Officer, General Manager of Sugar Mills, Deputy Director Mandi at this level.

Then they get promoted to Additional District Magistrate rank. Most districts have only two posts of ADMs, most common of them being ADM (Finance & Revenue), ADM (Executive) and ADM (Judicial). In few districts due to administrative convince, government has created posts like ADM (City) who look after law and order in city area of district, ADM (Land Acquisition) to speed up land acquisition process, ADM (Civil Supplies) who looks after ration shops and public distribution system, ADM (Protocol) who looks after protocol arrangements, ADM (Law & Order) in highly sensitive communal riots prone areas, ADM (Nazul) who looks after Nazul land. Some eastern UP districts, have a Chief Revenue Officer (CRO) who looks after land consolidation work.

Before 1992 when 73rd amendment which reformed Panchayati Raj Institutions, ADM (Planning & Projects) who was ex-officio District Planning & Project Officer used to look after rural development work in the districts. Currently at district level, Chief Development Officer (CDO) looks after rural development and sectoral related work in the district. He can be from IAS, PCS or PDS cadre. CDO has separate office from collectorate known as Vikas Bhawan in every district.

At the divisional level, PCS officers are posted as additional divisional commissioners. Most divisions have two such posts, most common of them being Additional Commissioner (Executive) and Additional Commissioner (Judicial). There can be more than one Additional Commissioner (Judicial) in a division depending on pending revenue appeal cases. Sometime they are also posted as Joint Development Commissioner and Regional Food Controller at divisional level apart from concerned departmental cadre officers.

In municipal corporations administered by the Department of Urban Development, PCS officers serve as municipal commissioners and additional municipal commissioners.

In development authorities administered by the Department of Housing and Urban Planning, PCS officers generally serve as OSDs, joint secretaries, secretaries and as vice chairmen.

PCS officers also serve as OSDs, deputy CEOs and additional CEOs in NOIDA (New Okhla Industrial Development Authority), Greater NOIDA and YEIDA (Yamuna Expressway Industrial Development Authority), which come under the Department of Infrastructure and Industrial Development.

At the state secretariat, PCS officers serve as special secretaries, joint secretaries and deputy secretaries. On a deputation, a PCS officer can be sent to one of the various directorates as additional directors, directors and chief general manager, additional/joint managing directors, managing directors in state PSUs.

After completion of two decades of service (generally till that period they reach up-to the level 14), those PCS officers who were directly recruited by Uttar Pradesh Public Service Commission (UPPSC) get promoted to the Indian Administrative Service, after confirmation by the Department of Personnel and Training of Government of India and the Union Public Service Commission. One-third of the total IAS strength in Uttar Pradesh is reserved for PCS officers (SCS quota).

=== Salary structure ===
Generally most of the PCS officers (only those who were directly recruited by UPPSC) get promoted into the IAS after reaching up-to the level of Special Secretary Grade. Those who don't get promotion to IAS then get pay level 15, and get classified as 'superseded'. Due to early promotion into IAS, Pay Level 14 and 15 are rarely given to PCS officers since 2021.

The salary structure of the Provincial Civil Service
Grade/level on pay matrix	Base Salary (per month)	Sanctioned Strength	Some Positions in the Government of Uttar Pradesh	Years of service
Higher administrative grade (Above Super time scale) (pay level 15)	₹182200–224100	10	Special secretary to GoUP, additional divisional commissioner, chief development officer, municipal commissioner, director of directorates, managing director of state PSUs, vice chairman of a development authority	27th year
Senior administrative grade (Above Super time scale) (pay level 14)	₹144200–218200	65	Special secretary to GoUP, additional divisional commissioner, chief development officer, municipal commissioner, director of directorates, managing director of state PSUs, vice chairman of a development authority	20th year
Super time scale (pay level 13A)	₹131100–216600	110	Special secretary to GoUP, additional divisional commissioner, chief development officer, municipal commissioner, director of directorates, managing director of state PSUs, vice chairman of a development authority	16th year
Selection grade (pay level 13)	₹118500–214100	200	Joint secretary to GoUP, additional district magistrate, additional municipal commissioner, additional director in directorates, additional/joint managing director in state PSUs, secretary of a development authority	12th year
Junior administrative grade (pay level 12)	₹78800–191500	250	Joint secretary to GoUP, additional district magistrate, additional municipal commissioner, additional director in directorates, secretary of a development authority	9th year
Senior time scale (pay level 11)	₹67700–160000	260	Deputy secretary to GoUP, City magistrate, General manager sugar mill, joint secretary of a development authority	5th year
Junior time scale (pay level 10)	₹56100–132000	267	Deputy secretary to GoUP, Sub-Divisional Magistrate, sub divisional magistrate (judicial), additional city magistrate, additional sub-divisional magistrate, deputy collector, officer on special duty in a development authority	Initial year

== Major concerns and reforms ==
=== Promotion to IAS ===
According to the Indian Administrative Service (Appointment by Promotion) Regulations, 1955, PCS officers are eligible for promotion to IAS after completion of eight years of service. But in reality, they are generally promoted to IAS after two decades in service.

Some PCS officers moved to the Allahabad High Court, due to the anomalies in their seniority which slowed down their promotion for almost one decade. The matter was resolved in 2012 as mentioned in their latest gradation list. In 2023, two 1989 batch Naib Tehsildar recruits who got promoted to 2006 batch in PCS after serving as Tehsildars were also promoted into IAS. The officers, Umakant Tripathi and Narendra Singh were allocated 2018 batch in IAS as per seniority.

=== Political influence ===
Directly recruited IAS officers often complain about promotee IAS officers are given preference in field postings due to their close proximity to politicians which they form in two decades of their service. Since the state government were often ruled by regional parties, many politicians allegedly fix 'their men' as divisional commissioners and district magistrates.

Also, an inquiry of recruitment of PCS officers by the Uttar Pradesh Public Service Commission (UPPSC) from 2012, by the Central Bureau of Investigation (CBI), has been started.

=== Corruption ===
Two PCS officers were suspended by the state government for an alleged land scam of ₹26 crore (equivalent to ₹37 crore or US$3.9 million in 2023). The house of a promotee IAS officer and a former district magistrate and collector of Ghaziabad, Vimal Kumar's house was raided by the Income Tax Department. Another promotee IAS officer, P. C. Gupta who was posted as CEO of Yamuna Expressway Industrial Development Authority was arrested for his alleged role in ₹126 crore land scam.

== Notable PCS officers ==
Members of the service include:

- Shrilal Shukla
- Shyam Singh Yadav
- Manoj Kumar Chauhan

== See also ==
- Provincial Finance and Accounts Service (Uttar Pradesh)
- Provincial Development Service (Uttar Pradesh)
- Provincial Secretariat Service (Uttar Pradesh)
- Provincial Transport Service (Uttar Pradesh)
