= Zero Poverty Uttar Pradesh Campaign =

Initiative by Government of Uttar Pradesh

Zero Poverty (ZPUP)
- Jīrō Pôvarṭī Uttara Pradēśa Abhiyāna
- Mission statement: An endeavour to make Uttar Pradesh the first zero-poverty State of India
- Slogan: Samāvēśa aisā kī kōī bhī nā chūṭē An inclusion such that no one is left out
- Country: India
- State: Uttar Pradesh
- Chief Minister: Yogi Adityanath
- Key people: Manoj Kumar Singh, IAS; Chief secretary of Uttar Pradesh
- Established: 2 October 2024; 2 years ago
- Launched: Gandhi Jayanti
- Website: Zero Poverty Program

Zero Poverty Uttar Pradesh Campaign, (Note: ISO: Jīrō Pôvarṭī Uttara Pradēśa Abhiyāna) also known as the Zero Poverty program, (Note: ISO: Jīrō Pôvarṭī Abhiyāna) is an initiative by the Government of Uttar Pradesh that was rolled out on 2 October 2024. It was announced by Yogi Adityanath, the chief minister of Uttar Pradesh on the occasion of Gandhi Jayanti.

The aim behind the program is to identify the extremely poor families in the state and proactively channelise Direct Benefit Transfer of various departments. Under this campaign, the state has identified the poorest 10 to 25 families from each gram panchayat. These welfares included both in-kind and cash transfers like Pradhan Mantri Awas Yojana, Mukhyamantri Awas Yojana, Pradhan Mantri Kisan Samman Nidhi, Shramik card, a golden card under Ayushman Bharat Yojana and other pension-related schemes.

The government has announced the campaign to take place in phases and has set 2 October 2025 as the target, aiming to bring the annual income of the families to a minimum of ₹1.25 lakh (equivalent to ₹1.3 lakh or US$1,400 in 2026), both from Direct Benefit Transfers and custom livelihood support for the identified poor households.

== Background ==
Percentage of population who are multidimensionally poor by state and union territory. Uttar Pradesh currently has one of the highest multidimensional poverty in India.

Uttar Pradesh has one of the highest poverty rates in India, ranked 25th out of 28 states in 2023 in terms of multidimensional poverty by the NITI Aayog. From 2018 to 2023, 13.5 crore Indians moved out of multidimensional poverty in India, of which Uttar Pradesh alone had 3.44 crore people, the highest in the country. It has witnessed one of the steepest declines in poverty alongside states like Bihar, Madhya Pradesh, Odisha and Rajasthan. Yogi Adityanath, the current chief minister of Uttar Pradesh, has stated that with the current rate of investment, by 2029, the nominal GDP of the state shall reach $1 trillion. Since 2017, Uttar Pradesh has experienced a significant economic turnaround, with the unemployment rate dropping from 19% to less than 3%, and per capita income rising from ₹46,000 (equivalent to ₹70,000 or US$750 in 2026) to ₹1.24 lakh (equivalent to ₹1.3 lakh or US$1,400 in 2026).

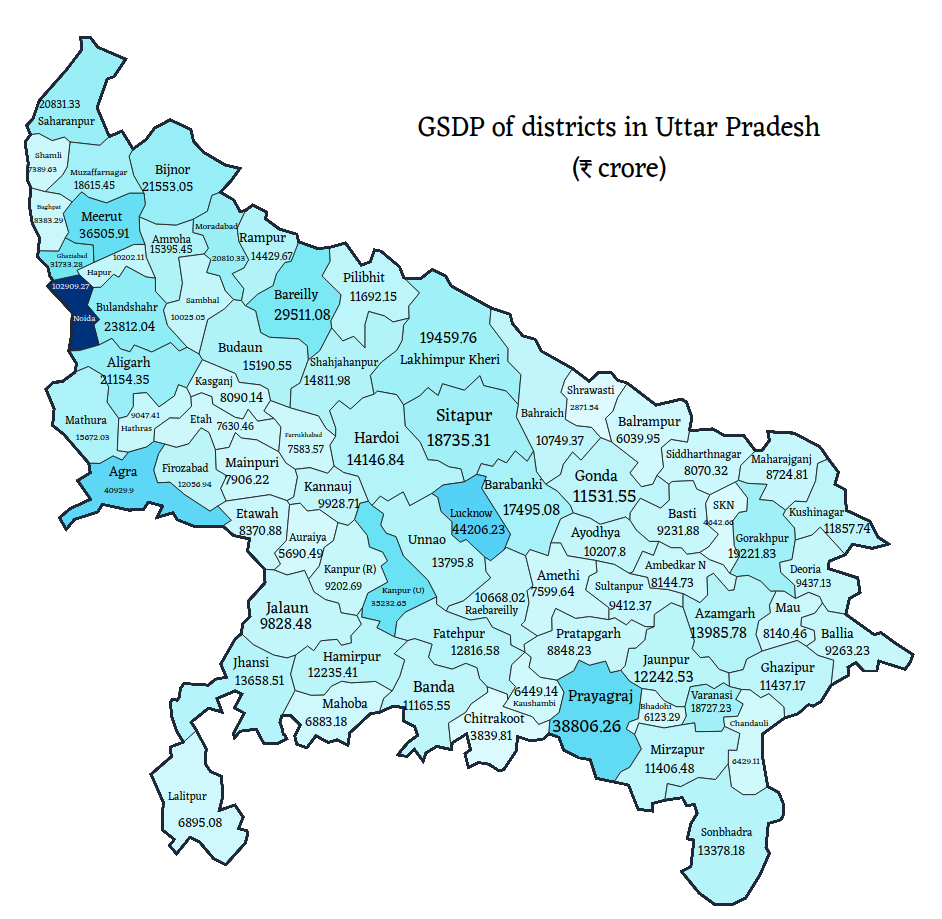
GSDP of the districts of Uttar Pradesh, March 2025. The western regions have greater income than the rest of the state.

The disparity between the western region of Uttar Pradesh compared to the rest of the state has been significant. Among the ten richest districts of the state by GDP per capita, seven are from west Uttar Pradesh - Gautam Buddha Nagar, Meerut, Etah, Agra, Amroha, Ghaziabad and Hapur. On the other hand, all of the bottom ten districts are from east Uttar Pradesh - Chandauli, Siddharthnagar, Deoria, Ballia, Pratapgarh, Jaunpur, Sant Kabir Nagar, Bahraich and Balrampur. In December 2023, the Gautam Buddha Nagar district contributed to 8.91% of the state's GDP, whereas the bottom 65 districts combined contributed to less than 4%.

On 2 October 2024, on the day of Gandhi Jayanti, Adityanath launched the Zero Poverty Program, with the aim to eradicate poverty in the state within one year, stating that Uttar Pradesh shall be the first state to do so. The initiative aimed to survey the rural poor households on four basic criteria:

1. Families that are homeless or live in kutcha houses
2. Landless families who have no other option of livelihood except agriculture;
3. Families dependent on daily wages, agricultural labour and have uncertain and irregular income;
4. Families which lack financial resources; there is always a shortage of food and clothing in the family.

The government announced that it shall partner with corporations and leverage the corporate social responsibility fund for the same. Overall, over 20 schemes run by the state government were to be provided to such families. By the end of 2024, the state government had begun conducting surveys to identify 15 lakh extremely poor families for the scheme.

== Budget ==
In February 2025, the ninth budget session under chief minister Yogi Adityanath and the sixth session under finance minister Suresh Kumar Khanna took place. This was the first time Zero Poverty Program was discussed during a budget session. In this, the Uttar Pradesh government announced the allocation of ₹250 crore (equivalent to ₹258 crore or US$28 million in 2026) towards the scheme, to ensure adequate availability of food and clothing, education, medicine, housing facilities and sustainable income to poor families. The government had aimed to bring the annual income of such families to at least ₹1.25 lakh (equivalent to ₹1.3 lakh or US$1,400 in 2026).

As a part of the campaign, the Mukhyamantri Suposhan Yojana (transl. Chief Minister Nutrition Scheme) was launched on 3 May 2025. It was first launched in 8 districts, for which a budget of ₹254.83 crore (equivalent to ₹263 crore or US$28 million in 2026) was presented.

For the ration delivery system, under the National Food Security Act, the state government approved a budget of ₹179.42 crore (equivalent to ₹185 crore or US$20 million in 2026) on 14 May 2025 for the procurement and delivery of the ration, and for interstate coordination.

As a part of the campaign, Uttar Pradesh was granted ₹12,031 crore (equivalent to ₹120 billion or US$1.3 billion in 2026) under the Pradhan Mantri Awas Yojana on 26 July 2025, to build permanent houses for the poor. For the cost of the construction, 60% was paid by the central government, while 40% was paid by the state government. The state government had previously allocated ₹200 crore (equivalent to ₹207 crore or US$22 million in 2026) to the housing schemes for families who were eligible for neither PM nor CM Awas Yojana by 8 April 2025.

== Initiatives ==
On 4 October 2024, the chief secretary of Uttar Pradesh, Manoj Kumar Singh, held a video conference with all the divisional commissioners and district magistrates of the state, urging them to identify the 25 poorest families from each gram panchayat.

Between 19 December 2024 and 15 January 2025, the survey for 650 out of the targeted 1,037 villages had been completed, in which an average of 25 families per village were made part of the welfare schemes. In the Aligarh district, the government could identify 20,500 such families in the 12 blocks it had divided the district into for the program. Out of these, the forms for 18,526 were filled by 17 January 2025. Similarly, over 15,000 families were also identified in the Varanasi district. In the Barabanki district, around 22,578 people were identified, of which 4,751 did not even have a ration card.

On 18 February 2025, in the Kushinagar district, a total of 23,963 families across 980 gram panchayats were identified, against the target of 24,500 families as stated by the district panchayati raj officer Alok Kumar Priyadarshi, bringing the progress of the identification progress to 97.81%. In the Lakhimpur Kheri district, it was found out during the survey that 22,573 families do not have a permanent house. These families were prioritised for housing assistance through the Pradhan Mantri Awas Yojana, aiming to provide them with permanent residences.

On 7 February 2025, chief secretary Manoj Kumar Singh mentioned that the data for approximately 13.57 lakh families had been collected, whereas 13.22 lakh of them had been verified. Of these, 11.1 lakh families were homeless and declared to be a top priority for the Pradhan Mantri Awas Yojana.

On 18 March 2025, commissioner Roshan Jacob conducted a review meeting focusing on financial approvals, the progress of construction projects, and the Zero Poverty program. She emphasised timely completion of projects, adherence to quality standards, and warned of actions against delays or subpar work. Additionally, she directed officials to prioritise housing for families without homes under the Pradhan Mantri Awas Yojana and ensure these families received essential services like clothing, food, education and healthcare.

On 27 March 2025, while celebrating the eighth anniversary of the Yogi Adityanath government, the initiation of the Zero Poverty Survey was highlighted.

The government of Uttar Pradesh started a campaign that was to run from 1 July 2025 to 30 September 2025, to ensure all the financial schemes are provided to the eligible families. Weekly reviews and monitoring were conducted to regularly track progress.

On the third day of the monsoon session of the Uttar Pradesh Legislative Assembly , on 13 August 2025, a 24-hour debate was held in the parliament on Vision 2047, where Zero Poverty was one of the targets addressed. During the 32 hours and 28 minutes-long debate, finance minister Suresh Kumar Khanna stated that by 2047, poverty will be eradicated from Uttar Pradesh.

=== Skill training and employment ===
In June 2025, chief secretary Manoj Kumar Singh emphasised accelerating the campaign by linking over 13,57,772 identified ultra-poor families to key government schemes and livelihood opportunities. He stressed the need to empower eligible youth from these households through focused skill development across priority sectors like manufacturing, banking, information technology, education and hospitality with support from industry and banking partners. A verified database of 13.5 lakh families was used to converge 17-20 welfare schemes and to ensure no household was left behind. The immediate focus was on training and placing a pilot cohort of 300 youth, aiming to generate sustainable incomes of ₹1.25−1.5 lakh annually through skill-linked employment. Discussions highlighted the need to bridge soft skill gaps, improve training quality and duration, and strengthen partnerships with institutions already active in skilling, placement, and women-led enterprises. The campaign also planned targeted outreach to special groups like women and persons with disabilities, ensuring inclusivity in the poverty eradication effort.

In the first phase of the campaign, the leaders of 300 poor families were identified and given skill training by the Uttar Pradesh Skill Development department. It was planned to associate over 1,000 training partners in fields like offices, toilet cleaning, guest attendant, housekeeping, hospitality and language skill as a part of the 360-degree approach. The goal was to get these people employed in companies like Taj Hotels, State Bank of India, Larsen & Toubro, Medanta and Adani Group, where they can earn a minimum of ₹18,400 (equivalent to ₹19,000 or US$200 in 2026). By 19 July 2025, 40 major business leaders had pledged to provide jobs to the family members identified in the campaign. Chief secretary Manoj Kumar Singh stated that employment was one of the key initiatives of the government aimed at truly empowering the poor, and that it could serve as a model for the rest of the country.

=== Website ===
The website, zero-poverty.in, was launched as a compilation of subdomains of welfare departments on-boarded under the campaign. In the first phase of the campaign, the chief secretary of Uttar Pradesh, Manoj Kumar Singh, guided the block development officers to register the verified profile of the enumerators (village panchayat level employees and cadres) on the website in a time-bound manner.

=== Mobile apps ===
==== BC Sakhi ====
Banking Correspondent (BC) Sakhi (Women Banking Agents) is a community cadre for providing banking and financial services at doorstep at rural areas in Uttar Pradesh. A dedicated mobile app was designed to promote the BC Sakhi Yojana, which was made to assist with the banking requirements in the rural parts of the state. It is one of the primary apps being used to conduct the survey for the program, alongside the panchayats and self-help groups.

The program provided an amount of ₹4,000 (equivalent to ₹4,100 or US$44 in 2026) per month for six months to help the BC Sakhi users stabilise their banking service business. As their business proceeded, the users were paid a commission based on the amount of transactions they made, which was generally 0.20%-0.32% of the amount transacted.

==== Rishta ====
Rishta is a mobile app launched by the Government of Uttar Pradesh on the day the initiative was launched by Livelihood Mission under the rural development department. The app provides a platform to monitor all processes with details related to financial transactions. The app shall also display detailed information on the poorest families identified by the mission's digital platform, allowing for an easy Direct Benefit Transfer.

The poorest families were to be selected on the digital platform in a way that their profile can be easily verified. The concerned department officers and employees were to be in regular contact with them. The poorest families will be selected on the basis of four standards.

==== MoP-UP ====
MoP-UP is a mobile app to collect data on the targeted poor families using a digital medium. The app was to be used by the members of the gram panchayats responsible for gathering information on such families to report to the state government. The registered users were able to use the video call feature provided by the chief minister's helpline and receive alerts, pop-up notifications and updates from the app. To ensure transparency, all the records were accessible on MoP-UP and the website.

=== Mukhyamantri Suposhan Yojana ===
On 3 May 2025, Yogi Adityanath launched the Mukhyamantri Suposhan Yojana (transl. Chief Minister Nutrition Scheme), tweeting the same day that it shall be a big gift for the families identified under the Zero Poverty campaign. The scheme was aimed towards over 11 lakh children aged between 3 and 6 years, giving them snacks worth 400 calories and 15-20 grams of protein each day.

The campaign was launched in 8 districts with the aim to prevent malnutrition, and related problems such as stunted growth, underweight and wasting Later, it was expanded to all the 75 districts of the state.

== Impact ==
On 6 February 2025 in the village of Silauli in Gosainganj, Ram Sagar was given a job at Ashok Leyland, a subsidiary of the Hinduja Group, as a truck maker. He had previously been living under poverty. Chief secretary Manoj Kumar Singh personally invited Ram Sagar and his wife Ruby to hand him his offer letter. Ram Sagar was the first beneficiary of the scheme, at a time when around 13,57,000 more families had also been registered.

In Sarojaninagar, the state government allocated the defunct land previously used by Scooters India Limited to the Hinduja Group to set up a factory for electric buses. The project head, Shakti Singh, signed a memorandum of understanding with the state government to create 12,000 jobs for the individuals whose families have been registered under the Zero Poverty Program. Ram Sagar was the first of the beneficiaries to work in the manufacturing plant. Ram Sagar, who could not read, was enrolled in an equivalency certification course to qualify for the position. He was also to undergo an apprenticeship under the state government with a stipend of ₹1,500 (equivalent to ₹1,500 or US$17 in 2026) per month. Hinduja Family Advisor S.K. Chaddha stated that Sagar's training shall last one year before he can go to the manufacturing plant. Until then, he was to work on-site.

On 27 February 2025, minister Satish Chandra Sharma visited Belkhara gram panchayat in Dariyabad Assembly constituency to review the progress of the surveys. With the help of the progress done, he was able to include all the eligible people in the Pradhan Mantri Awas Yojana scheme.

On 12 March 2025, in a speech at the Shahi Qila in Jaunpur, Adityanath stated that from 1 April, the programmes under the Zero Poverty campaign shall be expanded upon to cover the poor and deprived who are yet to benefit from the schemes. On 23 March 2025, the president of Suheldev Bharatiya Samaj Party and cabinet minister Om Prakash Rajbhar addressed a rally in Basti district, claiming that 15 lakh families had benefitted from the government schemes.

Upon the direction of chief secretary Manoj Kumar Singh, families who were identified under the Zero Poverty program were prioritised for the Pradhan Mantri Awas Yojana scheme in the Jhansi district. All the block development officers were instructed to complete the verification of the families and provide their information on the scheme's official portal by 30 March 2025.

By 13 June 2025, in the Sultanpur district, 524 families had received ration cards, of which 344 families belonged to the village of Jaisinghpur and 180 families belonged to the village of Motigarpur.

Chief Minister Yogi Adityanath told the Uttar Pradesh Legislative Assembly on 15 August 2025 that between 2017 and 2025, 6 crore people have risen above the poverty line as a result of the targeted policies and schemes of the government. He said that under the Zero Poverty campaign in the state, assistance is being provided to those who need to avail the schemes. He also stated that the Zero Poverty campaign has helped provide homes for the Vantanganiya and the Musahar communities. He then said that under the Zero Poverty Program, 14 lakh families have been identified and their families' identity cards have been made.

On 20 August 2025, 25 beneficiary families each from the gram panchayats of Juganupur, Chakalkhipur, Ramlok and Hasnapur were linked with Pradhan Mantri Awas Yojana, ration card, Ujjwala connection, Kisan Samman Nidhi, Anganwadi nutrition, student registration, textbook and dress distribution, disabled pension, Ayushman card, labor registration, MNREGA job card, Jal Jeevan Mission, Janani Suraksha Yojana and other government schemes. The Chief Development Officer Abhishek Kumar said that the families identified in Zero Poverty are the first beneficiaries of the village.

=== Zero Poverty-P4 ===
On 30 March 2025, the chief minister of Andhra Pradesh, N. Chandrababu Naidu launched Zero Poverty-P4, a public–private partnership program to alleviate poverty from Andhra Pradesh. As a part of the program, the top 10% economically prosperous members of the Telugu diaspora were to support mentor the bottom 20% underprivileged families to help them improve their economic condition. The government of Andhra Pradesh aimed to achieve its target by 2029.

== Limitations and shortcomings ==
While the Zero Poverty Program aimed to eradicate poverty from Uttar Pradesh within one year, 32,325 families from the Hardoi district identified were yet to be given any benefit five months after the conclusion of the survey. The district development officer of Hardoi stated that the second phase of the program was yet to be approved. The web portal for the District Panchayat Raj Department was yet to be opened even after the conclusion of the survey. On 10 February 2025, around 25,925 families in the Unnao district were yet to receive an update, although the survey had been conducted on 19 December 2024 and was 99% completed.

Until January 2025, in the Hathras district, the survey was not conducted by 89 enumerators due to technical issues. When the Panchayat Raj Department conducted its review, the phone numbers of many panchayat assistants were found to be wrongly recorded. Many panchayat assistants had even left their posts, and the remaining employees were not taking interest in the survey.

In the Kaushambi district, the Deputy Director of Agriculture Satyendra Kumar Tiwari withheld the salaries for March of two employees, Pankaj Patel and Ganesh Kumar, due to their negligence in the verification process of the Zero Poverty Initiative. Tiwari even warned them of further action being taken against them if the verification process was not completed immediately.

On 29 March 2025, the Chief Development Officer Diksha Jain reviewed the provision of housing to poor families under the Zero Poverty program. The budget under this scheme was to be returned after two days, despite the incomplete progress. The progress of MNREGA was 62% in Ghatampur, 47% in Kalyanpur and 71% in Bidhnu. Dissatisfaction was expressed over only 83 percent of the prescribed amount limit of National Rural Livelihood Mission being spent and the expected amount not being spent in startup, revolving fund and community investment fund.

At the launch of the campaign, Yogi Adityanath had claimed that the state shall achieve zero poverty by 2 October 2025. By 8 April 2025, however, Adityanath had made a change in his claim, stating that Uttar Pradesh shall achieve zero poverty within the next three years.

== See also ==
- Fome Zero, a similar initiative taken by the Federal government of Brazil in 2003
- Targeted Poverty Alleviation, an anti-poverty campaign in China
