= Provincial Development Service =

Civil service in Uttar Pradesh, India

- Prāntīya Vikāsa Sevā

State Civil Service overview
- Formed: 1952; 74 years ago
- Superseding State Civil Service: Provincial Rural Development Services
- Jurisdiction: Uttar Pradesh, India
- Employees: 559 (2012)
- Minister responsible: Dr. Mahendra Singh
- Parent department: Department of Rural Development
- Parent State Civil Service: Government of Uttar Pradesh

Provincial Development Service (IAST: Prāntīya Vikāsa Sevā), often abbreviated to as PDS, is the administrative civil service of the Government of Uttar Pradesh comprising Group A and Group B posts, responsible for administering rural development programmes of the Government of Uttar Pradesh and Government of India.

PDS officers hold various posts at block, district, divisional and state level managing rural administration and implementing various rural development schemes. The Department of Rural Development of the Government of Uttar Pradesh is the cadre-controlling authority of the service.

== Recruitment ==
Half of the recruitment to the service is made on the basis of an annual competitive examination conducted by Uttar Pradesh Public Service Commission. Half of the total strength of PDS officers is filled by promotion from departmental officers. PDS officers, regardless of their mode of entry, are appointed by the Governor of Uttar Pradesh.

== Career progression ==
After completing their training, a PDS officer generally serves as Block Development Officer in blocks in a district or Assistant Commissioners in Commissionerate of Rural Development. After that, they get promoted as District Development Officer or as Project Director of District Rural Development Agency or Deputy Commissioners of Mahatma Gandhi National Rural Employment Guarantee (popularly known as DC MGNREGA) or Deputy commissioners of National Rural Livelihood Mission (popularly known as DC NRLM) and later as, Chief Development Officer in districts or as Joint Development Commissioners in divisions and as Joint Commissioners in Commissionerate of Rural Development. Subsequently, they get promoted as Additional Commissioner in Commissionerate of Rural Development.

=== Salary structure ===
The salary structure of the Provincial Development Service
Grade/level on pay matrix	Base Salary (per month)	Some Positions in the Government of Uttar Pradesh	Years of service (approx.)
Pay Level 13	₹123100–215900	Additional Commissioner in Commissionerate of Rural Development	30th year
Pay Level 12	₹78800–209200	Chief Development Officer in District, Joint Development Commissioner in Division, Joint Commissioner in Commissionerate of Rural Development	26th year
Pay Level 11	₹67700–208700	District Development Officer in District, Project Director of District Rural Development Agency, Deputy Commissioner of Labour and Employment, Deputy Commissioner Self Employment in District, Deputy Commissioner in Commissionerate of Rural Development	12th year
Pay Level 10	₹56100–177500	Block Development Officer, Assistant Commissioner in Commissionerate of Rural Development	Initial year

== Officer Posting Controversy ==
The PDS Association demanded that IAS and PCS officers not be to posted as CDO, claiming that they have no expertise in rural development. They also claim that it takes much longer for PDS officers to be promoted than PCS or IAS officers. As a result, the state government reserved CDO posts of twenty-eight districts of Uttar Pradesh for PDS officers. However, The PDS Association claimed that the districts that had been reserved for PDS officers were backward ones.

== See also ==
- Provincial Civil Service (Uttar Pradesh)
- Provincial Forest Service (Uttar Pradesh)
- Provincial Police Service (Uttar Pradesh)
- Provincial Finance and Accounts Service (Uttar Pradesh)
- Provincial Secretariat Service (Uttar Pradesh)
- Provincial Transport Service (Uttar Pradesh)
