= Rajesh Kumar Pandey =

Indian Police Service officer

Rajesh Kumar Pandey PMG & Three Bars, PM, UNM

Personal details
- Born: 15 June 1961 (age 65) Bara, Prayagraj, Uttar Pradesh, India
- Citizenship: Indian
- Spouse: Meenu Pandey
- Children: 2
- Education: B.Sc., M.Sc. (Botany)
- Alma mater: Allahabad University
- Police career
- Country: India
- Department: Uttar Pradesh Police; Uttar Pradesh Special Task Force (UP STF); Anti-Terrorism Squad (UP ATS)
- Service years: 1989-2021
- Rank: Inspector General
- Badge no.: 20062538
- Awards: President’s Police Medal for Gallantry & Three Bars; Police Medal for Meritorious Service; United Nations Medal (UNMIK)

Rajesh Kumar Pandey, PMG & Three Bars, PM, UNM (Hindi: राजेश कुमार पाण्डेय; born 15 June 1961), also known as Rajesh Pandey, is a retired IPS officer (promoted from PPS) cadre of the IPS-SPS 2003 batch Uttar Pradesh. He was inducted into the Indian Police Service in 2005.

He was selected as P.P.S. officer of 1986 batch through Uttar Pradesh Public Service Commission. He joined U.P. Police as Deputy S.P. on 21 February 1989. He is the founding member of Uttar Pradesh Special Task Force (UP STF) and the state's counterterrorism unit, Anti-Terrorism Squad (ATS).

He has been awarded the President's Police Medal for Gallantry (PMG) four times in 1999, 2000, 2007 and 2016. During his deputation to the United Nations Peacekeeping Mission in Kosovo, he was conferred with the United Nations Medal in 2008. He retired from the Uttar Pradesh Police as IG, Election Cell on 30 June 2021, after 32 years of service.

Following his retirement, the Government of Uttar Pradesh appointed him as the nodal security officer of UPEIDA and Purvanchal Expressway. In 2023, Pandey co-authored his first book Operation Bazooka along with journalist and media-studies professor, Rakesh Goswami.
