= Rajive Kumar =

Former Chief Secretary of Uttar Pradesh

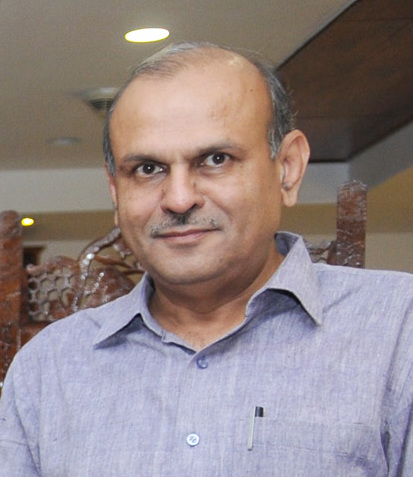

1st Chairperson of Uttar Pradesh Real Estate Regulatory Authority
- In office 9 August 2018 – 30 June 2023
- Nominated by: Chief Minister of Uttar Pradesh
- Appointed by: Governor of Uttar Pradesh
- Governor: Ram Naik
- Preceded by: Office established
- Succeeded by: Sanjay Bhoosreddy

Chief Secretary of Uttar Pradesh
- In office 29 June 2017 – 30 June 2018
- Appointed by: Chief Minister of Uttar Pradesh
- Governor: Ram Naik
- Chief Minister: Yogi Adityanath
- Preceded by: Rahul Bhatnagar
- Succeeded by: Anup Chandra Pandey

Road Transport and Highways Secretary of India (Acting)
- In office 16 May 2017 – 27 June 2017
- Appointed by: Appointments Committee of the Cabinet
- Minister: Nitin Gadkari
- Preceded by: Sanjay Mitra
- Succeeded by: Yudhvir Singh Malik

Shipping Secretary of India
- In office 1 December 2014 – 27 June 2017
- Appointed by: Appointments Committee of the Cabinet
- Minister: Nitin Gadkari

Personal details
- Born: Rajive Kumar; 28 June 1958 (age 68) Bulandshahr, Uttar Pradesh, India
- Education: University of Lucknow (B.Sc., M.Sc. Physics); Harvard University (MPA)
- Occupation: Retired IAS officer
- Profession: Civil servant
- Awards: Distinguished Alumni Award, University of Lucknow (2018)

Rajive Kumar (born 28 June 1958) is a retired 1981 batch Indian Administrative Service officer from the Uttar Pradesh cadre who served as the Chief Secretary of the Government of Uttar Pradesh, in addition to this he also served as the Shipping Secretary of India.

== Education ==
Kumar holds a Master of Public Administration degree in public administration from Harvard Kennedy School at Harvard University, and a Master of Science degree in physics from Lucknow University.

== Career ==
=== Indian Administrative Service ===
Kumar has served in various key positions for both the Government of Uttar Pradesh and the Government of India, including as the Chief Secretary and Principal Resident Commissioner of Uttar Pradesh, divisional commissioner of Meerut, Saharanpur and Faizabad divisions, the managing director of Uttar Pradesh State Industrial Development Corporation, managing director of Uttar Pradesh State Mineral Corporation, executive director of Udyog Bandhu, Director (Revenue Intelligence) in the Department of Revenue, the district magistrate and collector of Mathura and Firozabad districts, and as the vice chairperson of the Mathura Development Authority in the Uttar Pradesh government, and as Union Road Transport and Highways Secretary, Union Shipping Secretary and as special secretary in the Ministry of Petroleum and Natural Gas, additional secretary in the Cabinet Secretariat, and as a joint secretary in the Department of Economic Affairs of the Ministry of Finance in the Indian government.

==== Shipping Secretary ====
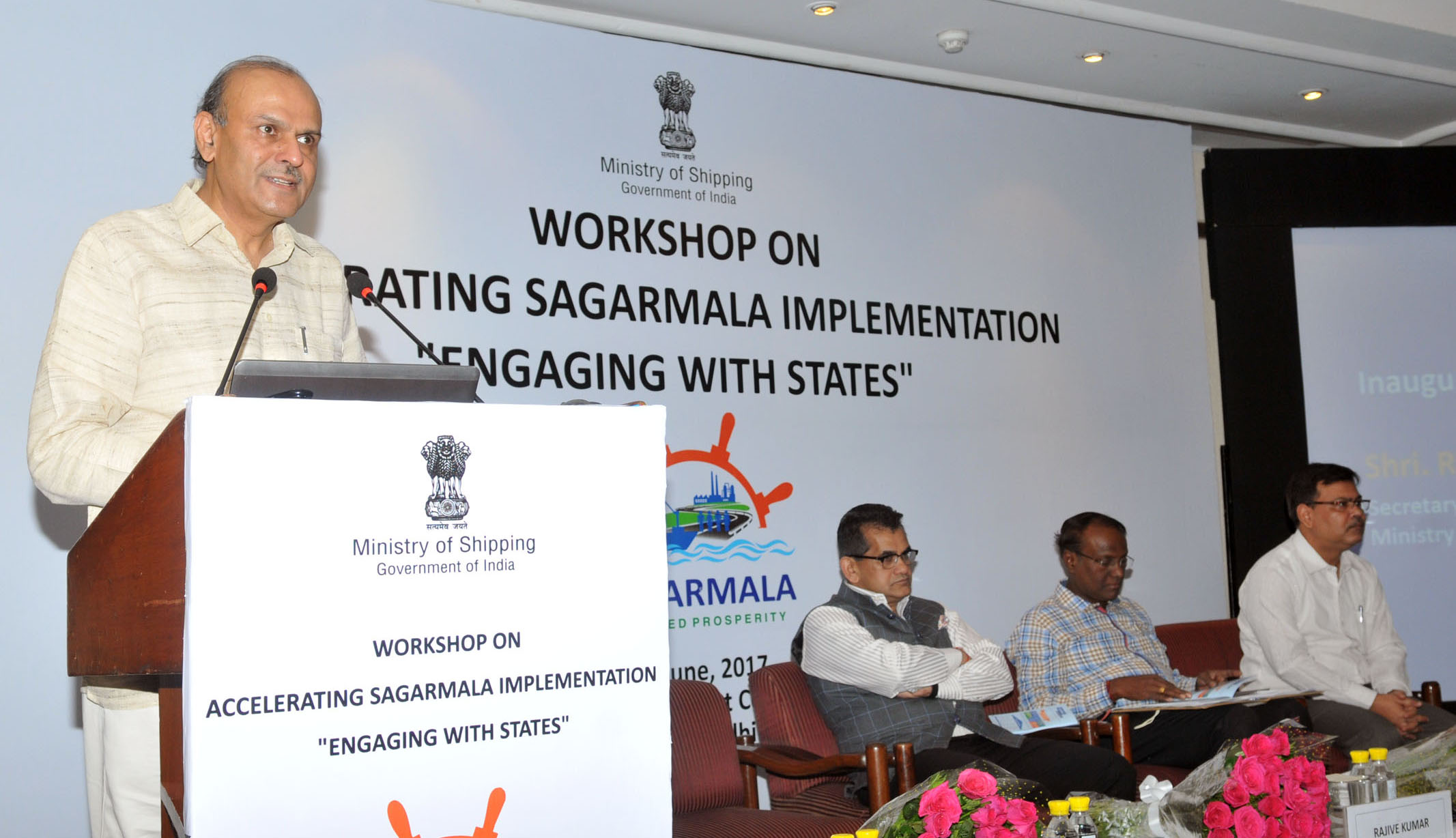
Kumar (left) addressing a workshop

Kumar was appointed as the Shipping Secretary of India by the Appointments Committee of the Cabinet (ACC) on 1 December 2014. He was given the additional charge of Ministry of Road Transport and Highways by the ACC on 10 May 2017. He demitted the offices on 27 June 2017, when his was repatriated to his state cadre by the Government of India, on the request of Uttar Pradesh government.

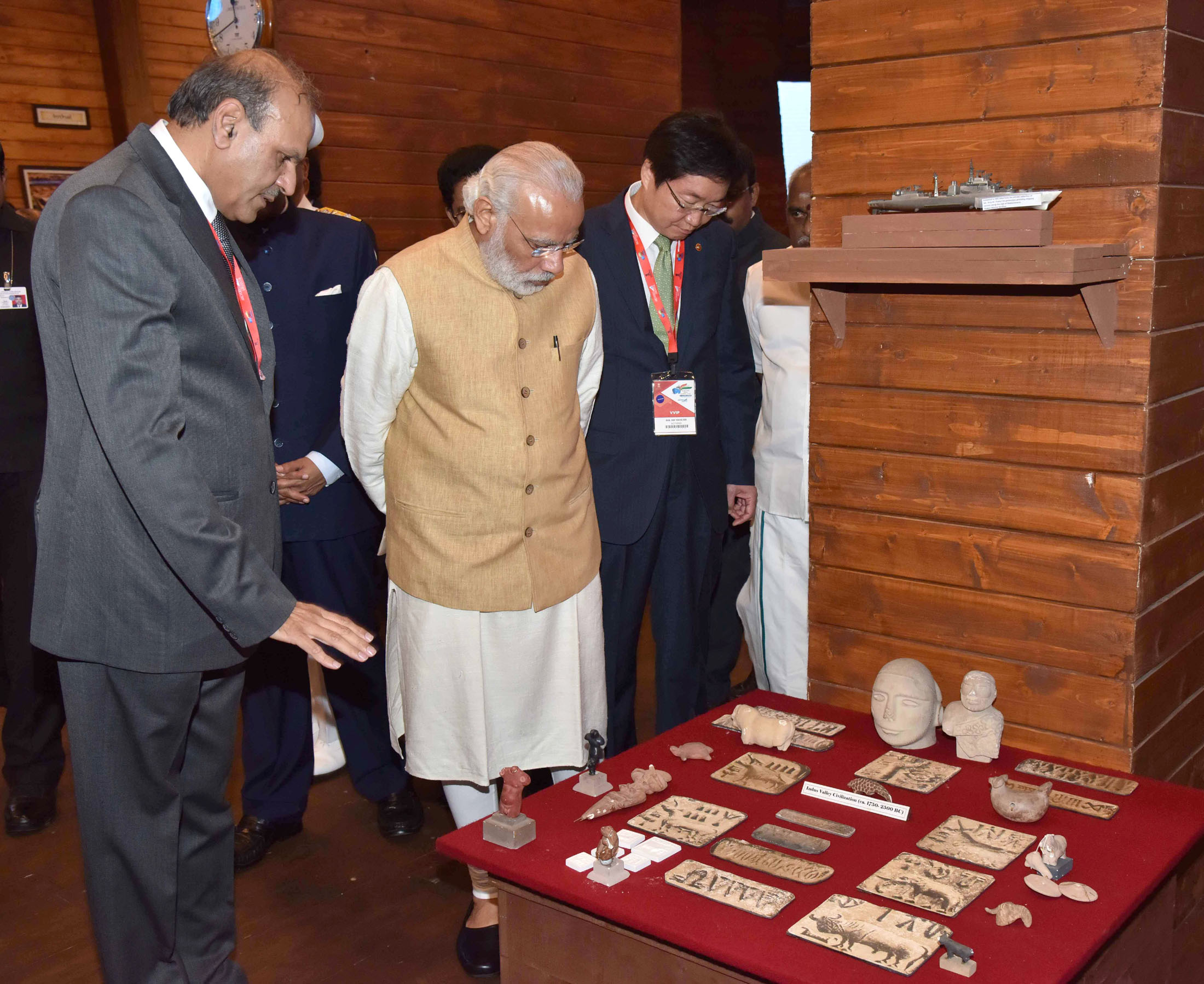
Kumar (left) with Prime Minister of India, Narendra Modi (centre)

==== Chief Secretary of Uttar Pradesh ====
After being repatriated to his state cadre by the Government of India on the request of the Government Uttar Pradesh on 20 June 2017, Kumar was appointed the Chief Secretary and Principal Resident Commissioner of Uttar Pradesh government by the Chief Minister of Uttar Pradesh on 29 June 2017.

Kumar demitted the office of chief secretary—and simultaneously superannuated from service—on 30 June 2018, serving as Uttar Pradesh's top bureaucrat for more than a year, and was succeeded by Anup Chandra Pandey. Kumar's tenure as chief secretary was generally considered successful.

=== Post-IAS ===
After his retirement from the Indian Administrative Service, Kumar was nominated to become the Government of Uttar Pradesh as the first chairperson of the Uttar Pradesh Real Estate Regulatory Authority (UP RERA) in August 2018; Kumar was sworn in as the chairperson of UP RERA by Uttar Pradesh governor, Ram Naik, on 9 August 2018 and served the office till 30 June 2023.
