= Provincial Transport Service =

Provincial Transport Service Prāntīya Parivahana Sevā
Service Overview
- Popularly known as: Uttar Pradesh Civil Service (Transport Branch)
- Founded: 1989
- State: Uttar Pradesh
- Staff College: State Transport Authority, Lucknow, Uttar Pradesh
- Cadre Controlling Authority: Commissionerate of Transport, Department of Transport, Government of Uttar Pradesh
- Minister Responsible: Daya Shankar Singh, Cabinet Minister for Transport, Government of Uttar Pradesh
- Legal personality: Governmental: Government service
- Duties: State Transport Administration; Vigilance Road Safety
- Current Cadre Strength: 252 members (168 officers directly recruited by UP-PSC and 84 officers promoted from its feeder service)
- Selection: State Civil Services Examination
- Association: Uttar Pradesh PTS Association

Head of the State Civil Services
- Chief Secretary: Mr. Durgasankar Mishra, IAS
- Principal Secretary (DoRD): Aradhana Shukla, IAS
- Rural Development Commissioner: P. Guru Prasad, IAS

Provincial Transport Service (IAST: Prāntīya Parivahana Sevā), often abbreviated to as PTS, is the civil service under Group A state service of Government of Uttar Pradesh responsible for formulation and administration of the rules, regulations and laws relating to road transport, and transport research, in order to increase the mobility and efficiency of the road transport system in the state.

== Recruitment ==
The recruitment to the service is made on the basis of an annual competitive examination conducted by Uttar Pradesh Public Service Commission. One-third of PTS quota is filled by promotion from its feeder service. PTS officers, regardless of their mode of entry, are appointed by the Governor of Uttar Pradesh.

== Responsibilities of PTS officer ==
The typical functions performed by a PTS officer are:

- Formulation of policies relating to regulation of road transport, legislation relating to road transport including aspects of road safety, environmental issues, automotive norms besides making arrangements for movement of vehicular traffic with neighbouring states.
- Licensing of drivers/conductors, registration of motor vehicles, control of motor vehicles through permits and dealing with special provisions relating to state transport undertakings, traffic regulation, insurance, liability, offences and penalties, etc.

== Career progression ==
After completing their training, a PTS officer generally serves as assistant regional transport officer in districts. There are two posts of ARTO in districts i.e. ARTO (Administration) and ARTO (Enforcement), however in big districts there can be two-four ARTO (Enforcement) but only one ARTO (Administration). After that, they get promoted as regional transport officer at divisional level (Ghaziabad being exception which is only a district), each division has two RTO i.e. RTO (Administration) and RTO (Enforcement). Later they get further promotion as Deputy Transport Commissioners (Dy. TC) and are posted either in six transport zones or at commissionerate of transport. Subsequently they get promoted as additional transport commissioners (Addl. TC) either at field (west, east and central) or at commissionerate of transport. There is one Special Secretary post reserved for PTS officer in Transport Department.

=== Salary structure ===
The salary structure of the Provincial Transport Service Officer
Grade/level on pay matrix	Base Salary (per month)	Position in the Government of Uttar Pradesh	Years of service
Senior administrative grade (Above Super time scale) (pay level 14)	₹144200–218200	Special Secretary in Transport department	35th year
Super time scale (pay level 13A)	₹131100–216600	Additional Transport Commissioner	32nd year
Selection grade (pay level 13)	₹118500–214100	Deputy Transport Commissioner	26th year
Junior administrative grade (pay level 12)	₹78800–191500	Regional Transport Officer	19th year
Senior time scale (pay level 11)	₹67700–160000	Assistant Regional Transport Officer	12th year
Junior time scale (pay level 10)	₹56100–132000	Assistant Regional Transport Officer	Initial year

== See also ==
- Provincial Civil Service (Uttar Pradesh)
- Provincial Forest Service (Uttar Pradesh)
- Provincial Police Service (Uttar Pradesh)
- Provincial Finance and Accounts Service (Uttar Pradesh)
- Provincial Development Service (Uttar Pradesh)
- Provincial Secretariat Service (Uttar Pradesh)
