= Provincial Forest Service (Uttar Pradesh) =

Provincial Forest Service Prāntīya Vana Sevā
Service Overview
- Also known as: Uttar Pradesh Forest Service
- Founded: 1966
- State: Uttar Pradesh
- Staff College: Central Academy for State Forest Service, Dehradun
- Cadre Controlling Authority: Department of Forest and Wildlife, Government of Uttar Pradesh
- Minister Responsible: Dr. Arun Kumar Saxena, Minister of Forest and Wildlife, Government of Uttar Pradesh
- Legal personality: Governmental: Natural Resources
- Duties: Forestry, Wildlife, Environmental Science and Ecology
- Current Cadre Strength: 174 members (58 officers directly recruited by UP-PSC as ACF and 116 officers promoted from Forest Rangers' cadre)
- Selection: State Forest Service Examination
- Association: Uttar Pradesh PFS Association

Head of the State Civil Services
- Chief Secretary: Sri Shashi Prakash Goel, IAS
- Principal Secretary (DoF&W): Smt. V. Hekali Zhimomi, IAS
- Principal Chief Conservator of Forests (Head of Forest Forces): Shri Sunil Chaudhary, IFS

Provincial Forest Service (IAST: Prāntīya Vana Sevā), often abbreviated to as PFS, is one of the state natural resource services under Group 'A' and Group 'B' state service of Government of Uttar Pradesh responsible for ensuring the ecological stability of the country via thorough protection and participatory sustainable forestry, wildlife and environment. It is also the feeder service for Indian Forest Service in the state.

The Department of Forest and Wildlife of the Government of Uttar Pradesh is the cadre-controlling authority of the service. Along with the two state civil services which are Provincial Civil Service (PCS) and the Provincial Police Service (PPS), the PFS being a state natural resource service is one of the three feeder services to its respective All India Services.

== Recruitment ==
In theory, one-third of the PFS quota is filled by promotion from Forest Rangers' cadre, and the remainder of recruitment is done on the basis of an annual competitive examination conducted by Uttar Pradesh Public Service Commission, but in reality, there hasn't been an examination held for ACF in many years. PFS officers, regardless of their mode of entry, are appointed by the Governor of Uttar Pradesh.

== Responsibilities of PFS officer ==
The typical functions performed by a PFS officer are:

- Conservation of precious forest resources while understanding the larger policies of the government to protect and preserve the heritage of the forest and its resources.

== Career progression ==
After completing their training, a PFS officer generally serves as assistant conservator of forests and are posted as sub-divisional forest officer. After that they are promoted as deputy conservator of Forests, divisional forest officer, deputy director in forest department.

=== Salary structure ===
Most of the directly recruited PFS officers get promoted to the IFS after getting pay level 11.

The salary structure of the Provincial Forest Officer
Pay Level 12	₹78800-209200	Joint Director	13 - 15 year
Pay Level 11	₹67700–208700	Deputy Director	8 - 10 year
Pay Level 10	₹56100–177500	Assistant Conservator of Forests.	Initial year

== See also ==
- Provincial Finance and Accounts Service (Uttar Pradesh)
- Provincial Development Service (Uttar Pradesh)
- Provincial Secretariat Service (Uttar Pradesh)
- Provincial Transport Service (Uttar Pradesh)
