= Ramesh Kumar =

Ramesh Kumar may refer to:

- Ramesh Kumar (politician), Indian politician
- K. R. Ramesh Kumar, Indian politician
- Ramesh Kumar (kabaddi), Indian Kabaddi player
- Ramesh Kumar (wrestler), Indian wrestler
- Ramesh Kumar (nephrologist), Indian physician
- Ramesh Kumar Nibhoria, Indian engineer and entrepreneur
- Ramesh Kumar Pandey, Indian academic
- Ramesh Kumar Vankwani, Pakistani politician
- Ramesh Kumar (cricketer), Indian cricketer
