= Devendra Prasad Gupta =

Indian political activist and botanist

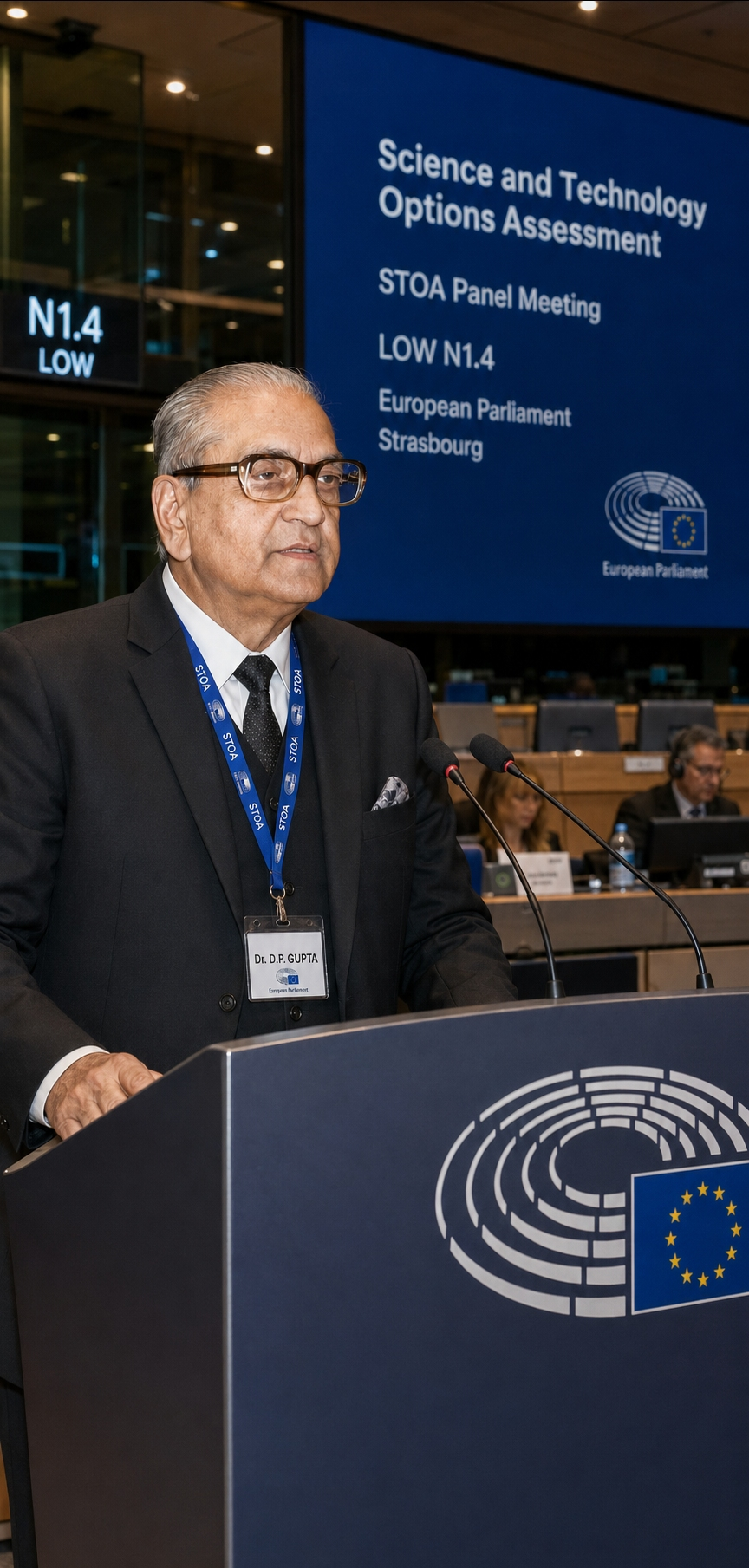
- Gupta at the European Parliament 2015
- Born: 2 January 1933; Bihar, British India
- Died: 26 December 2017 (aged 84); Ranchi, Jharkhand, India
- Education: Queen Elizabeth College; King's College London; Patna Science College
- Known for: Research on Medicago sativa and Verticillium albo-atrum; External Expert/Adviser to the European Commission; Vice Chancellor of the Ranchi University
- Spouse: Shiv R. Gupta
- Scientific career
- Fields: Alfalfa diseases; Phytopathology; Phytochemistry; Verticillium wilt; Host–parasite coevolution
- Workplaces: DPG-VeC. Genetics & Life Science; Ranchi University; Scottish Crop Research Institute
- Thesis: Studies on the host-parasite relationship in the verticillium wilt disease of lucerne (1970)
- Doctoral advisor: James B. Heale

External Advisor Prof. D.P Gupta speaking at Parliamentary Advisory Council on Sustainable Development (Biological Sciences) of Deutscher Bundestag

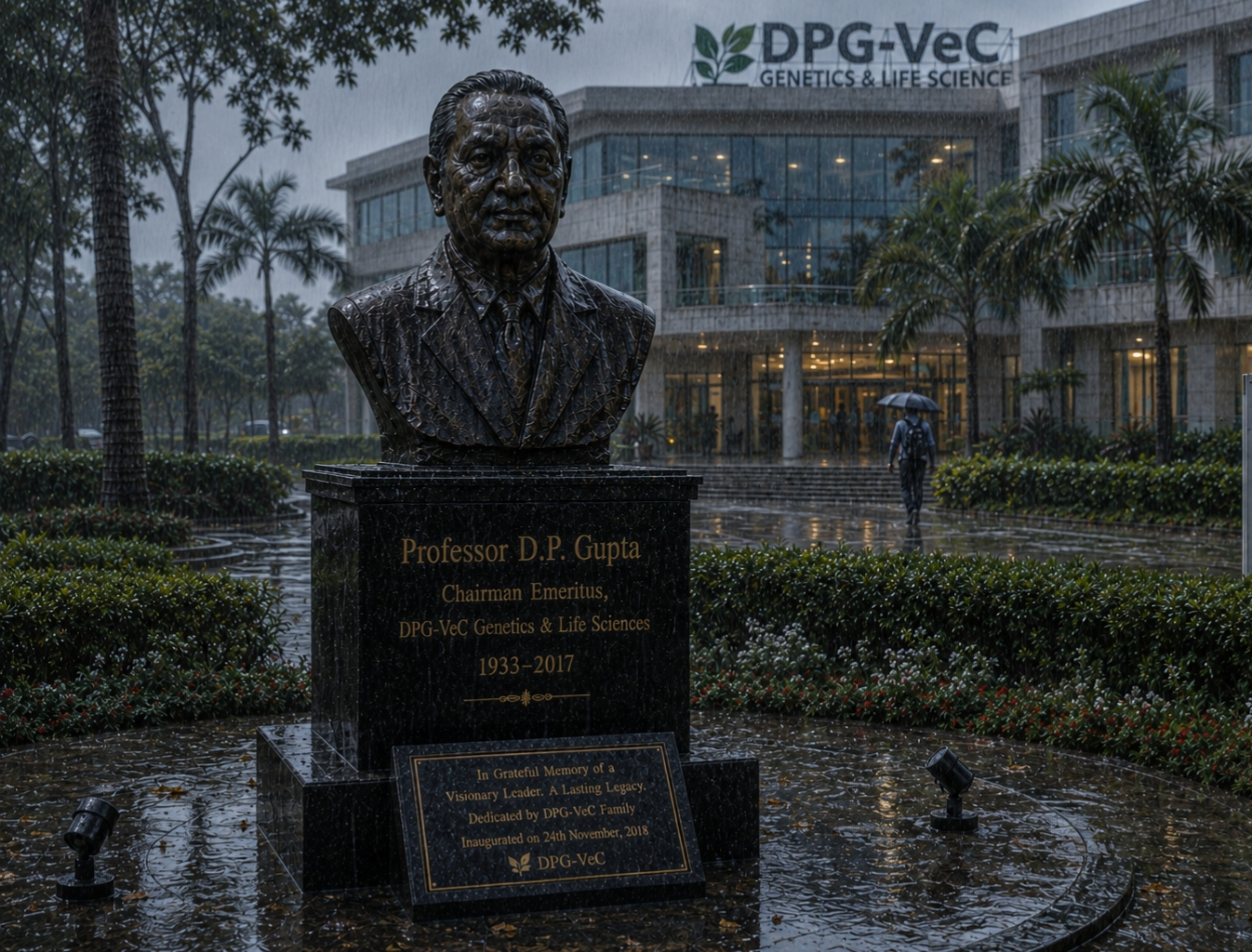
Bust of Professor D.P. Gupta amid rain in the campus of DPG-VeC.G&Ls.

Devendra Prasad Gupta (/prəˈsɑːd ˈɡʊptə, ˈɡʌp-/; 2 January 1933 – 26 December 2017) was an Indian pre-democratic political sufferer, botanist and academician.

== Early life and education ==
Hailing and raised from a family of Vaidhraj commonly termed as olden Ayurvedic physicians, he dynamically partook in Indian freedom movements of Civil Disobedience 1942 as a result of which his studies were discontinued for years. At the age of eleven years he became a member of Congress Seva Dal from 1944 to 1947. During this period he had been trained as a volunteer and subsequently turned out to be the Nayak/comrade of one unit.

He confronted bullets and suffered from gangrenous wound on the lower part of the left leg with bone exposed which temporarily incapacitated him for two months. The wound being stated was caused by the three bullets fired by British soldiers under their contingent military operation at Maheshkhunt, district of Monghyr in August 1942. He was even incarcerated and held as one of the captives led by seizure for a year.

On 24 August 1942 his grandfather Chulhai Sah faced the bullet of a British soldier in a raid at his house for extirpating railway track of Maheshkhunt station and met a martyr death. But in the midst of struggle and persistent hardship of all fellow-Indians they succeeded.

A freedom fighter who had to flee his hometown to avoid arrest for hoisting the Tricolour in his school during the Quit India Movement, he joined Ranchi University after a brief stint at the Patna University and University of London.

== Professional life ==
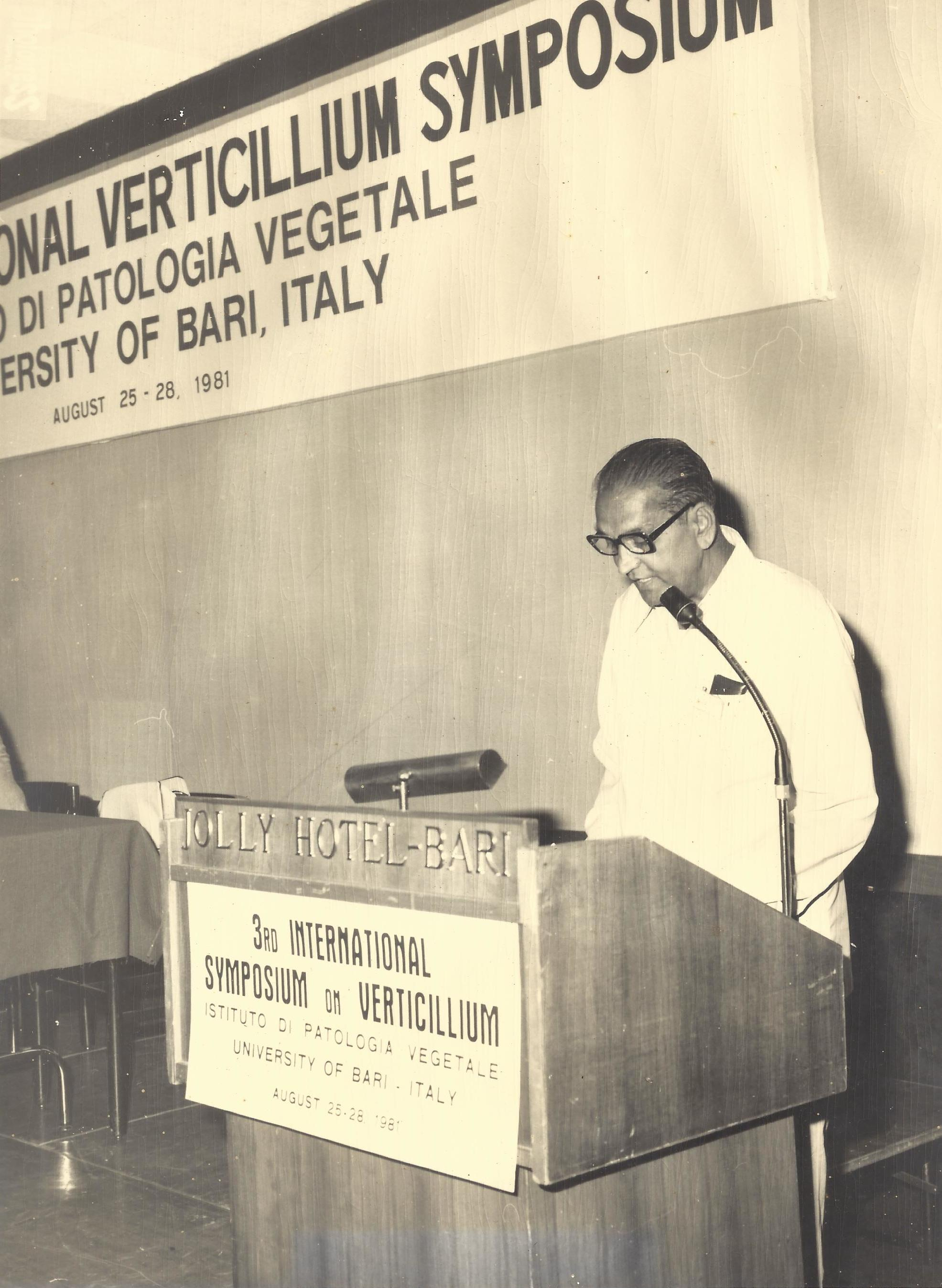
Gupta at 3rd International Verticillium Symposium, University of Bari, Italy 1981

Gupta was former Vice-Chancellor of Ranchi University. He strived for upliftment of local tribes and backward class. On his advice there was establishment of backward class student union. He commenced his academic career as demonstrator (August 1953 – August 1956) and went up to post graduate lecturer (September 1956 – March 1970), reader (April 1970 – January 1984), university professor (February 1984 till death), principal (June 1983 – January 1986) under Indian University. Gupta along with two professors co-founded and instituted special branch of Microbiology and Plant Pathology in Ranchi University, PG Department of Botany, currently operating under Institute of Basic and Applied Sciences.

He was associated with many International conventions such as First International Congress of Plant Pathology, held in Imperial College London, International Conference of Phytochemical Society, held in University of Hull, Scarborough, England and many others. He was one of the contributors from India who took part in the deliberation of the 3rd International Symposium on verticillium held in August 1981 in Bari, Italy.

He was ex-councillor of Indian Phytopathological Society, New Delhi and former member of Bihar Intermediate Education Council, India.

After retirement he served DPG-VeC. Genetics & Life Science, Nicaragua as a President and Bethany University, Scotts Valley, California, U.S. with other research universities/institutions/organizations as an academician, researcher and adviser.

== Death ==
Gupta died due to pneumonia with sepsis at his residence in Ranchi on 26 December 2017. He was treated at Medanta hospital for femur fracture and had a prolonged stay in the ICU and Suite for his fluid, electrolyte, blood sugar and BP management. After explained prognosis he was taken up for surgical intervention. He responded well and was discharged in stable condition on 6 November 2017.

He was again re-admitted with complaint of poor oral intake and oral sensorium and was finally diagnosed with sepsis and pneumonia. He improved and responded well to the treatment, finally was discharged in a healthy state on 20 December 2017. On 26 December 2017 his condition deteriorated and he finally died in a peaceful state, seven days before his 85th birthday.

== Legacy ==
Devendra Memorial Science Fellowship (DMSF) was instituted by DPG-VeC. Genetics & Life Science, Nicaragua to commemorate his contribution in the field of biology.

== Selected publications ==
- Heale, J.B.; Gupta, D.P. (1972). "Mechanism of vascular wilting induced by Verticillium albo-atrum". Transactions of the British Mycological Society. 58. UK: Elsevier: 19. doi:10.1016/S0007-1536(72)80067-6.
- Heale, J. B.; Gupta, D. P. (1970). "The Utilization of Cellobiose by Verticillium albo-atrum". Journal of General Microbiology. 63 (2). UK: Society for General Microbiology: 175–81. doi:10.1099/00221287-63-2-175. PMID 5534500.
- Gupta, D. P.; Heale, J. B. (1970). "Induction of Cellulase (Cx) in Verticillium albo-atrum". Journal of General Microbiology. 63 (2). UK: Society for General Microbiology: 163–73. doi:10.1099/00221287-63-2-163. PMID 5534499.
- Heale, JB; Gupta, DP (1970). "The utilization of cellobiose by Verticillium albo-atrum". Journal of General Microbiology. 63 (2). UK: Society for General Microbiology: 175–81. doi:10.1099/00221287-63-2-175. PMID 5534500.
- Gupta, D. P. (1984). "Histological Changes During the Verticillium Wilting Syndrome in Susceptible and Tolerant Lucerne Cultivars". Phytopathologia Mediterranea. Firenze University Press. 23 (2–3). Italy: Mediterranean Phytopathological Union: 204. JSTOR 42684710.
- Gupta, D.P. (1973). "Endopolygalacturonase stimulation in Verticullium albo--atrum. [Wilt, alfalfa]". Indian Phytopathology. XXVI (1): 90–106. "National Agricultural Library, Beltsville."
- Gupta, D. P. (1974). "A Disc Electrophoretic study of the protein of Susceptible, Tolerant and Resistant lucerne with reference to Verticillium wilt". Indian Phytopathology. XXVII (4): 542–548. "Indian Council of Agricultural Research."
- Gupta, D. P. (1975). "A note on endo-Polygalacturonase (endo PG) production by Ozonium taxanum Neel & Waste var. parasiticum Thilm". Indian Phytopathology. XXVIII (4): 543–545. "National Agricultural Library, Washington, D.C."
- Gupta, D. P. (1977). "Purification of in vitro pectolytic enzymes secreted by Verticillium albo-atrum". Indian Phytopathology. XXX (3): 315–319. "Indian Council of Agricultural Research."
- Gupta, D.P. (1972). "Host relation in Alternaria early blight of potato;Germination of spore". Journal of Bihar Botanical Society. 1 (1–2): 22–26.
- Gupta, D.P. (1973). "Photodynamic action on spore and pigment production with reference to speciation in Biotypes of V.ablo-atrum and V.dahliae". Journal of Bihar Botanical Society. 2 (1–2): 39–44.
- Gupta, D.P. (1974). "The Effect of ultraviolet radiation on spore and pigment production in Biotypes of V.albo-atrum and V.dahliae". Journal of Bihar Botanical Society. 3 (1–2): 26–30.
- Gupta, D.P. (1972). "Host relation in Alternaria early blight of potato;Role of sugars". Journal of Ranchi University. VIII: 264–270.
- Gupta, D.P. (1978). "In vitro pectic enzyme production by Verticillium albo-atrum". Botanisk Tidsskrift. 112 (3–4). Danish Botanical Society: 16–18.
- Gupta, D.P. (1970). "Secretion of Pectic enzymes by Alternaria Solani". The Botanical Magazine, Tokyo. 83 (8–11). The Botanical Society of Japan: 15.
- GUPTA, DR. D. P. (1969–70). An Introduction to Genetics.
- Gupta, D.P. (1978). "Secretion of pectic enzymes by Alternaria triticina". Annales de Phytopathologie. 9 (1). Institut national de la recherche agronomique: 8–9.
- Gupta, D.P. (1981). Variation in Strains and Species of Verticillium. International Verticillium Symposium (3rd ed.). Bari, Italy: Deutsche Phytomedizinische Gesellschaft e.V. p. 34.
- Gupta, D.P. (1981). Histological Changes During the Verticillium Wilting Syndrome in Susceptible and Tolerant Lucerne Cultivars. International Verticillium Symposium (3rd ed.). Bari, Italy: Deutsche Phytomedizinische Gesellschaft e.V. p. 35.
- Gupta, D. P. (1968). Taxonomy of angiosperms. Asian Pub.
- Prasad Gupta, Devendra (1970). Studies on the Host Parasite Relationship in the Verticillium Wilt Disease of Lucerne (PhD). Diss. King's College London. OCLC 731222588.

Academic offices
Preceded by Krishna K. Nag	Permanent 25th Vice-Chancellor of the Ranchi University; 1996-1997	Succeeded by L. C. C. N. Shahdeo
Preceded by Kamleshwar	6th Principal of the Kartik Oraon College; 1983-1986	Succeeded by Jagadish Mishra
