= Durga Shanker Mishra =

Indian bureaucrat and former chief secretary of Uttar Pradesh

- Durgā Śaṃkara Miśrā
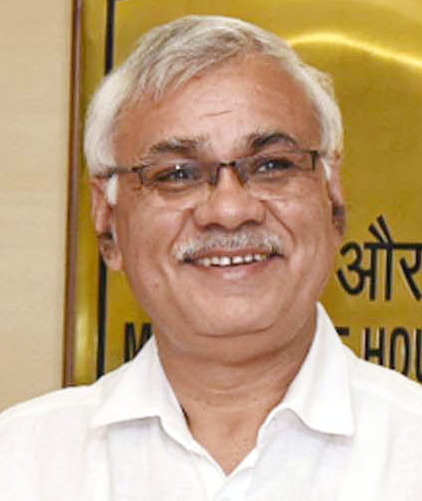
- Mishra in July 2018

Chief Secretary Government of Uttar Pradesh
- In office 30 December 2021 – 30 June 2024
- Preceded by: Rajendra Kumar Tiwari
- Succeeded by: Manoj Kumar Singh

Housing and Urban Affairs Secretary of India
- In office 21 June 2017 – 29 Dec 2021
- Preceded by: Rajiv Gauba
- Succeeded by: Manoj Joshi

Personal details
- Born: 4 December 1961 (age 64) Mau, Uttar Pradesh, India
- Education: IIT Kanpur; University of Western Sydney; International Institute of Social Studies
- Occupation: IAS officer

Durga Shanker Mishra (IAST: Durgā Śaṃkara Miśrā) (born 4 December 1961) is a 1984 batch retired Indian Administrative Service (IAS) officer of Uttar Pradesh cadre. He served as Chief Secretary to Government of Uttar Pradesh from 30 December 2021 till 30 June 2024. Previously, he served as Housing and Urban Affairs Secretary and Chairman of the Delhi Metro Rail Corporation.

== Education ==
Mishra is a graduate (BTech) in electrical engineering from IIT Kanpur. He also holds an MBA degree in international business from the University of Western Sydney. Mishra also holds a postgraduate diploma in public policy from International Institute of Social Studies, The Hague. In addition, Mishra holds a postgraduate diploma in human resource management.

== Career ==
Mishra has served in various key positions for both the Government of India and the Government of Uttar Pradesh during his career, like as Principal Secretary (Appointment and Personnel), Secretary (Tax and Registration), Secretary (Health and Family Welfare), managing director of Uttar Pradesh Scheduled Caste Finance and Development Corporation (SDCFC), district magistrate and collector of Agra and Sonbhadra districts, Vice Chairman of Kanpur Development Authority and as the municipal commissioner of Kanpur in the Uttar Pradesh government, and as the Union Housing and Urban Affairs Secretary, additional secretary in the Ministry of Urban Development, joint secretary in the Ministry of Mines, joint secretary in the Ministry of Home Affairs and as the chief vigilance officer of the Airports Authority of India in the Indian government.

=== Housing and Urban Affairs Secretary ===
Durga Shanker Mishra was appointed as the Union Housing and Urban Affairs Secretary by the Appointments Committee of the Cabinet, he assumed the office of Secretary on 21 June 2017 and served there till 29 December 2021.
