= Provincial Finance and Accounts Service =

Provincial Finance and Accounts Service Prāntīya Vitta Evaṃ Lekhā Sevā
Service Overview
- Also known as: Uttar Pradesh Civil Service (Finance and Accounts Branch)
- Founded: 3 April 1965
- State: Uttar Pradesh
- Staff College: Institute of Financial Management, Training & Research (IFMTR), Lucknow, Uttar Pradesh
- Cadre Controlling Authority: Directorate of Treasuries, Department of Finance, Government of Uttar Pradesh
- Minister Responsible: Suresh Kumar Khanna, Cabinet Minister for Finance, Government of Uttar Pradesh
- Legal personality: Governmental: Government service
- Duties: State Finance Administration; State Accounts Management
- Current Cadre Strength: 732 members (488 officers directly recruited by UP-PSC and 244 officers promoted from state Audit and Accounts Officers cadre)
- Selection: State Civil Services Examination
- Association: Uttar Pradesh PFAS Association

Head of the State Civil Services
- Chief Secretary: Durga Shankar Mishra, IAS
- Additional Chief Secretary (Finance) and Finance Commissioner: Deepak Kumar, IAS
- Director of Treasuries: Alok Agarwal, PFAS

Provincial Finance and Accounts Service / Provincial Civil Service (Finance) (IAST: Prāntīya Vitta Evaṃ Lekhā Sevā), often abbreviated to as PFAS or PCS (Finance) is one of the premier Group A state civil service under Executive branch of Government of Uttar Pradesh responsible for Finance Administration of the state.

== Recruitment ==
The recruitment to the service is made on the basis of an annual competitive examination conducted by Uttar Pradesh Public Service Commission. One-third of PFAS quota is filled by promotion from Audit and Accounting officers' cadre. PFAS officers, regardless of their mode of entry, are appointed by the Governor of Uttar Pradesh.

== Responsibilities of PFAS officer ==
The officers of the cadre are known for their knowledge, wisdom and integrity; and are considered as watchdogs of the state exchequer. The members of the service working at higher levels of the government set-up render consultation support regarding maintenance of the financial discipline, to the heads of departments or institutions and administrative Secretaries, as the case may be.

The typical functions performed by a PFAS officer are:

- Internal Audit, testing of budget estimate, sending it to the department and to ensure that all material purchasing done in the department are in accordance with the financial rules.
- In every department an Accounts Section has been established whose in-charge is the Senior Finance and Accounting Services officer appointed in that department. This Accounts Section provides help to the Head of the Department on financial matters related to that department.
- Budget Control, proper maintenance of records related to accounts and compliance of financial discipline in the department according to rules indicated in financial hand-book is carried out by Financial Controller appointed in that department.
- To timely send indent for availability of stamps by Treasuries and to ensure availability of adequate quantity of stamps in Treasuries and Sub-Treasuries.

== Career progression ==
After completing their training, a PFAS officer generally serves as treasury officer at district treasury in the collectorate. After that, they get promoted to the rank of senior treasury officer (STO), and later, chief treasury officer (CTO). Most districts only have one senior treasury officer except those districts which are also divisional headquarters have chief treasury officer heading the district treasury.

After few years of service, they are promoted as Joint Director and thereafter as Additional Director (treasury and pensions) at every divisional level. A post of Additional Commissioner (finance) also exists at divisional level under Board of Revenue which is held by PFAS officers.

In the finance department in state secretariat, PFAS officers serve as special secretaries, joint secretaries and also in some instances as deputy secretaries. The also serve as Finance Officers, directors, additional directors and joint directors in any directorate attached to state finance department such as Directorate of Treasuries, Directorate of Finance, Directorate of Pensions, Directorate of Internal Account Examination and Institute of Financial Management, Training & Research in Lucknow which is staff college for PFAS officers.

Apart from that, they serve as Comptroller in state universities And finance controllers (FC), chief finance and accounts officer (CAO), Senior finance and accounts officer and finance and account officers in all state departments, directorates, autonomous bodies, urban local bodies, panchayati Raj institutions and other agencies.

=== Salary structure ===
The salary structure of the Provincial Finance and Accounts Service Officer
| Grade/level on pay matrix | Base Salary (per month) | Some Positions in the Government of Uttar Pradesh | Years of service |
|---|---|---|---|
| Senior administrative grade (Above Super time scale) (pay level 14) Grade pay:10000 | ₹144200–218200 | finance controller in any big department, directorate or agency, director in any directorate of finance department, special secretary in finance department | 32rd year |
| Super time scale (pay level 13A) Grade pay:8900 | ₹131100–216600 | finance controller in any medium department, directorate or agency, additional director in any directorate of finance department, special secretary in finance department, special Secretary cum finance controller (Raj Bhawan) | 30th year |
| Selection grade (pay level 13) Grade pay:8700 | ₹118500–214100 | finance controller in any small department, directorate or agency, additional director in any directorate of finance department, joint secretary in finance department | 23rd year |
| Junior administrative grade (pay level 12) Grade pay:7600 | ₹78800–191500 | chief finance and account officer, joint director in any directorate of finance department, chief treasury officer, deputy secretary in finance department, Officer on Special Duty (OSD) to Chief Minister | 15th year |
| Senior time scale (pay level 11) Grade pay:6600 | ₹67700–160000 | Senior finance and account officer, deputy director in any directorate of finance department, senior treasury officer | 8th year |
| Junior time scale (pay level 10) Grade pay:5400 | ₹56100–132000 | finance and account officer, deputy director in any directorate of finance department, treasury officer | Initial year |

== See also ==
- Provincial Civil Service (Uttar Pradesh)
- Provincial Forest Service (Uttar Pradesh)
- Provincial Police Service (Uttar Pradesh)
- Provincial Development Service (Uttar Pradesh)
- Provincial Secretariat Service (Uttar Pradesh)
- Provincial Transport Service (Uttar Pradesh)
