= Provincial Secretariat Service =

Provincial Secretariat Service Prāntīya Sacivālaya Sevā
Service Overview
- Also known as: Uttar Pradesh Secretariat Service
- Founded: 1986
- State: Uttar Pradesh
- Staff College: Secretariat Training and Management Institute, Lucknow, Uttar Pradesh
- Cadre Controlling Authority: Department of Secretariat Administration, Government of Uttar Pradesh
- Minister Responsible: Yogi Adityanath, Chief Minister of Uttar Pradesh and Minister of Secretariat Administration
- Legal personality: Governmental: Government service
- Duties: State Policy Formulation; State Secretarial assistance
- Current Cadre Strength: 357 members (238 officers directly recruited by UP-PSC and 119 officers promoted from Section Officers' cadre)
- Selection: State Civil Services Examination
- Association: Uttar Pradesh PSS Association

Head of the State Civil Services
- Chief Secretary: Dr. Anup Chandra Pandey, IAS
- Additional Chief Secretary (DoSA): Mahesh Kumar Gupta, IAS

Provincial Secretariat Service (IAST: Prāntīya Sacivālaya Sevā), often abbreviated to as PSS, is the civil service under Group A and Group B state service of Government of Uttar Pradesh responsible for providing a permanent bureaucratic set up which assists in establishment and administration, policy formulation and monitoring and review of the implementation of policies/schemes of various departments.

== Recruitment ==
The recruitment to the service is made on the basis of an annual competitive examination conducted by Uttar Pradesh Public Service Commission. One-third of PSS quota is filled by promotion from Section Officers' cadre. PSS officers, regardless of their mode of entry, are appointed by the Governor of Uttar Pradesh.

== Responsibilities of PSS officer ==
The typical functions performed by a PSS officer are:

- To handle the administration and daily proceedings of the government, including formulation and implementation of policy in consultation with the minister-in-charge, additional chief secretary/principal secretary and secretary of the concerned department.

== Career progression ==
After completing their training, a PSS officer generally serves as under secretary in state secretariat in all departments. After that, they get promoted as deputy secretary. Later they get further promotion as joint secretary. Subsequently, they get promoted and retire as special secretary.

=== Salary structure ===
The salary structure of the Provincial Secretariat Service
Grade/level on pay matrix	Grade Pay	Position in the Government of Uttar Pradesh	Years of service
Super time scale (pay level 13A)	8900	Special Secretary (43 posts)	30th year
Selection grade (pay level 13)	8700	Joint Secretary (80 posts)	24th year
Junior administrative grade (pay level 12)	7600	Deputy Secretary (85 posts)	16th year
Senior time scale (pay level 11)	6600	Under Secretary (158 posts)	10th year
Junior time scale (pay level 10)	5400	Section Officer	5th year
Entry Grade (pay level 8)	4800	Review Officer	Initial year

== See also ==
- Provincial Civil Service (Uttar Pradesh)
- Provincial Forest Service (Uttar Pradesh)
- Provincial Police Service (Uttar Pradesh)
- Provincial Finance and Accounts Service (Uttar Pradesh)
- Provincial Development Service (Uttar Pradesh)
- Provincial Transport Service (Uttar Pradesh)
