= Provincial Police Service (Uttar Pradesh) =

Group 'A' policing service of the Indian state of Uttar Pradesh

Provincial Police Service Prāntīya Pulisa Sevā
Service overview
- Also known as: Uttar Pradesh Police Service
- Founded: 1858; 168 years ago
- State: Uttar Pradesh
- Staff college: Dr. Bhim Rao Ambedkar Police Academy, Moradabad, Uttar Pradesh
- Cadre controlling authority: Department of Home and Confidential, Government of Uttar Pradesh
- Minister responsible: Yogi Adityanath, Chief Minister of Uttar Pradesh and Minister of Home and Confidential
- Legal personality: Governmental: civil service
- Current cadre strength: 1310 members (807 officers directly recruited by the Uttar Pradesh Public Service Commission and 503 officers promoted from the rank of inspector)
- Selection: State Civil Services Examination
- Association: Uttar Pradesh PPS Association

Head of the State Civil Services
- Chief Secretary: M.K. Singh, IAS
- Additional Chief Secretary (Home): Sanjay Prasad, IAS
- Director General of Uttar Pradesh Police: Rajiv Krishna, IPS

Provincial Police Service (IAST: Prāntīya Pulisa Sevā), often abbreviated to as PPS, is the state civil service for policing of Uttar Pradesh Police comprising Group A and Group B posts. It is also the feeder service for Indian Police Service in the state.

PPS officers hold various posts at the circle, district, range, zonal and state levels to maintain order, enforce the law and to prevent and detect crime. The Department of Home and Confidential of the Government of Uttar Pradesh is the cadre controlling authority of the service. Along with the Provincial Civil Service (PCS) and the Provincial Forest Service (PFS), the PPS is one of the three feeder services to its respective All India Services.

== Responsibilities of a PPS officer ==
The typical functions performed by a PPS officer are:

- To fulfil duties based on border responsibilities, in the areas of maintenance of public peace and order, crime prevention, investigation, and detection, collection of intelligence, VIP security, counter-terrorism, border policing, railway policing, tackling smuggling, drug trafficking, economic offences, corruption in public life, disaster management, enforcement of socio-economic legislation, bio-diversity and protection of environmental laws etc.
- Leading and commanding the State Vigilance Establishment, Crime Branch-Criminal Investigation Department (CB-CID), State Intelligence Bureau etc under the supervision of officers senior to them.
- Leading and commanding the UP-PAC, State Special Task Force (UP-STF) etc. under the supervision of police officers senior to them.
- To interact and coordinate closely with the members of other state civil services in the matters regarding policing.
- To lead and command the force with courage, uprightness, dedication and a strong sense of service to the people.
- Endeavour to inculcate in the police forces under their command such values and norms as would help them serve the people better.
- Inculcate integrity of the highest order, sensitivity to aspirations of people in a fast-changing social and economic milieu, respect for human rights, the broad liberal perspective of law and justice and high standard of professionalism.

== Career progression ==
Post the completion of his or her training, a PPS officer, in the rank of deputy superintendent of police (Dy. SP), generally serves at the police circle level as circle officer. Generally, a police circle consists of three to five police stations. After that, they get promoted to the rank of Additional Superintendent of Police (SP). Districts with a senior superintendent of police (SSP) as the police chief generally have four Addl. SPs under the SSP, each responsible for city, rural areas, crime and traffic designated as 'SP (City)', 'SP (Rural Areas)', 'SP (Crime)' and 'SP (Traffic)'. In metropolitan cities in UP, jurisdictional SPs like SP City or SP Rural Areas are further divided into various designations such as 'SP (North)', 'SP (South)', 'SP (East)', 'SP (West)', SP (Ganga Par), SP (Yamuna Par), 'SP (Trans Gomti)' etc. Whereas, districts with a superintendent of police (SP) as the police chief usually have one and rarely two SPs under them which generally have a lower grade pay than the SP who is the head of the district.

Recently, Lucknow City, Gautam Budh Nagar (Noida), Kanpur Nagar and Varanasi became police commissionerates. PPS officers at DSP rank are posted as ACP (Assistant Commissioner of Police) and at SP rank are posted as ADCP (Additional Deputy Commissioner of Police).

At the zonal level, a PPS officer is posted as the staff officer of the concerned additional director general of police heading the zone which is of Addl. SP rank. Before 2017, they were posted as staff officer to IG police zone but now ADG ranked officers are posted in zones. PPS officers of the rank of SP are also posted as sector officers in the Crime Branch-Criminal Investigation Department. PPS officers are also attached to DGP Headquarters as Addl. SP and Dy. SP. They are also posted in State Police Recruitment and Promotion Boards, Anti Terrorist Squad, Special Task Force, Special Investigation Team, State Vigilance Establishment, Economic Offences Wing HQ etc.

PPS officers also serve as second-in-command and deputy commandants (at SP rank) and assistant commandants (at Dy. SP rank) in the Uttar Pradesh Provincial Armed Constabulary, Uttar Pradesh's state armed police force. On deputation, a PPS officer can be sent to one of the various constitutional bodies, agencies and state public sector enterprises, such as the Uttar Pradesh Power Corporation Limited, electricity distribution boards, Uttar Pradesh Human Rights Commission, Uttar Pradesh Disaster Response Force etc. in capacity of SP and Dy. SP. Some PPS officers have also go to work for central government agencies such as the Enforcement Directorate and the National Investigation Agency.

After completion of two decades of service, PPS officers directly recruited by Uttar Pradesh Public Service Commission (UPPSC) get promoted to the Indian Police Service, after confirmation by the Ministry of Home Affairs of Government of India and the Union Public Service Commission. One-third of the total IPS strength in Uttar Pradesh is reserved for PPS officers (SPS quota).

=== Salary structure ===
Most of the directly recruited PPS officers get promoted to the IPS after getting grade pay of level 13 or 13A. Those who don't get promotion to IPS get classified as 'superseded' and get the grade pay of level 14.

The salary structure of the Provincial Police Service
Insignia	Grade/level on pay matrix	Base salary (per month)	Sanctioned Strength	Some key positions	Years of service
	Senior administrative grade (Above Super time scale) (pay level 14)	₹144200–218200	10	Additional Superintendent of Police, Superintendent of Police (City, Rural Area, Crime, Traffic), Additional Deputy Commissioner of Police, Deputy Commandant PAC etc.	22nd year
	Super time scale (pay level 13A)	₹131100–216600	27	Additional Superintendent of Police, Superintendent of Police (City, Rural Area, Crime, Traffic), Additional Deputy Commissioner of Police, Deputy Commandant PAC etc.	21st year
	Selection grade (pay level 13)	₹118500–214100	67	Additional Superintendent of Police, Superintendent of Police (City, Rural Area, Crime, Traffic), Additional Deputy Commissioner of Police, Deputy Commandant PAC etc.	16th year
	Junior administrative grade (pay level 12)	₹78800–191500	182	Additional Superintendent of Police, Superintendent of Police (City, Rural Area, Crime, Traffic), Additional Deputy Commissioner of Police, Deputy Commandant PAC etc.	12th year
	Senior time scale (pay level 11)	₹67700–160000	250	Deputy Superintendent of Police, Circle Officer, Assistant Commissioner of Police, Assistant Commandant PAC etc	5th year
	Junior time scale (pay level 10)	₹56100–132000	756	Deputy Superintendent of Police, Circle Officer, Assistant Commissioner of Police, Assistant Commandant PAC etc	Initial year

== Major concerns and reforms ==
=== Promotion to IPS ===
According to the Indian Police Service (Appointment by Promotion) Regulations, 1955, PPS officers are eligible for promotion to IPS after completion of eight years of service. But in reality, officers are generally promoted to the IPS after two and half decades in service. Unlike their counterparts in PCS who get promoted to IAS almost ten years early.

=== Demand for SP level postings while in PPS ===
PPS Association has repeatedly demanded to post its officers in Pay Level 13A and 14 grade at Superintendent of Police and equivalent rank instead of Additional Superintendent of Police and equivalent rank. Such postings are given to state police service officers in states like Punjab, Jammu and Kashmir, Odisha etc.

=== Political influence ===
Directly recruited IPS officers often complain that promotee PPS officers are given preference in field postings due to their close proximity to politicians which they form in two decades of their service. Since the state government was often ruled by regional parties, many politicians allegedly fix 'their men' on important inspector general and deputy inspector general rank positions. Currently 32 out of 75 district SSPs and SPs are promotee IPS officers, including the SSP of Kanpur Nagar, which has the largest district police force in the state. In addition six deputy inspectors general heading range headquarters are promotee IPS officers.

== See also ==
- Provincial Finance and Accounts Service (Uttar Pradesh)
- Provincial Development Service (Uttar Pradesh)
- Provincial Secretariat Service (Uttar Pradesh)
- Provincial Transport Service (Uttar Pradesh)
