= R. K. Tiwari =

Indian civil servant

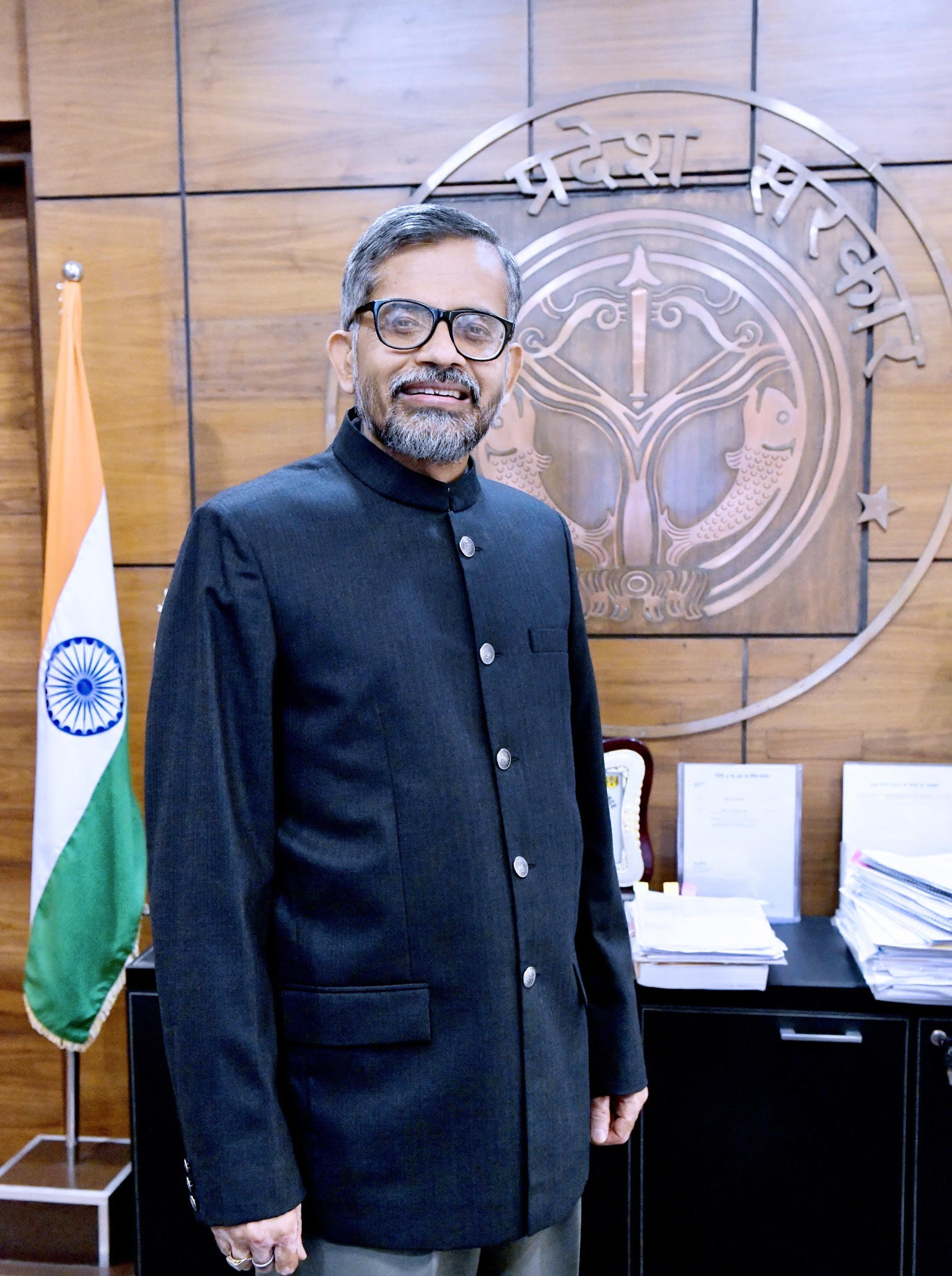
- Rajendra Kumar Tiwari

Chief Secretary Government of Uttar Pradesh
- In office 30 August 2019 – 30 December 2021
- Preceded by: Anup Chandra Pandey
- Succeeded by: Durga Shanker Mishra

Personal details
- Born: Rajendra Kumar Tiwari; 4 February 1963 (age 63) Mahoba, Uttar Pradesh, India
- Spouse: Dr. Archana Tiwari
- Relatives: D.K. Tiwari (brother)
- Education: Indian Institute of Technology Kanpur; University of Sussex
- Occupation: IAS officer, Civil servant

Rajendra Kumar Tiwari (born February 4, 1963), commonly known as R. K. Tiwari is a retired Indian civil servant and Indian Administrative Services officer of Uttar Pradesh cadre from the 1985 batch. He served as the Chief Secretary of the Government of Uttar Pradesh from 30 August 2019 to 30 December 2021, succeeding Anup Chandra Pandey.

== Education ==
He did his primary education from Government Intermediate College Lalitpur, then completed his graduation in B.Tech from the Indian Institute of Technology Kanpur. He also holds a master's degree in Arts from the UK.

== Career ==
Tiwari joined Indian Administrative Service as an officer in 1985. He has served in several bureaucratic positions for the Government of India and the Government of Uttar Pradesh, including Joint Secretary to the Government of India in the Ministry of Agriculture And Co-operation. He has served previously in various departments in the Uttar Pradesh government like higher and secondary education, industrial development, agriculture, infrastructure, commercial tax, labour, IT and electronics etc.

He was the additional chief secretary home in the Government of Uttar Pradesh and has also served as District Magistrate and Collector in Agra, Sultanpur and Mirzapur in the past.

In August 2019, he was appointed as 53rd Chief Secretary of the Uttar Pradesh government by CM Yogi Adityanath and served the office till 30 December 2021. Before his appointment as the CS, he was serving as the Commissioner (Agriculture Production) of UP government. He also held the additional charge of UP chief secretary after the retirement of Anup Chandra Pandey in September 2019. He retired from the services in February 2023.

The Print reports him to be one of the UP's powerful civil servants in CM Yogi Adityanath's government.
