= Department of Appointment and Personnel =

- Niyukti Evaṃ Kārmika Vibhāga

Department overview
- Preceding agencies: Department of Appointment; Department of Personnel
- Jurisdiction: State of Uttar Pradesh
- Headquarters: Department of Appointment and Personnel, Lal Bahadur Shastri Bhawan (Annexy Building), Sarojini Naidu Marg, Lucknow, Uttar Pradesh; 26.8404943°N 80.94444599999997°E
- Minister responsible: Yogi Adityanath, Chief Minister of Uttar Pradesh and Minister of Appointment and Personnel
- Department executive: Dr.Devesh Chaturvedi, IAS, Additional Chief Secretary (Appointment and Personnel)
- Website: Official website

The Department of Appointment and Personnel (DoAP) is a department of Government of Uttar Pradesh. The Department of Appointment is responsible for the matters related to transfer posting, training, foreign assignment, Foreign training and compliant monitoring and settlement for the Indian Administrative Service (IAS), the Provincial Civil Service (PCS) and the Provincial Civil Service-Judicial (only after consulting Allahabad High Court), whereas, the Department of Personnel provides opinion to the Department of Secretariat Administration and other departments in the matter of condition of service and regulation for recruitment to the subordinate services.

The Chief Minister of Uttar Pradesh serves as the departmental minister, and the Additional Chief Secretary (Appointment and Personnel), an IAS officer, is the administrative head of the department.

== Functions ==
The Department of Appointment and Personnel is responsible for forming and the regulating of the service rules-related rules and regulations for government officers. The department answers questions in the legislative assembly and the legislative council, addresses issues related to the policies and norms—as laid down by it—are followed by all departments in the recruitment, regulation of service conditions, transfer-posting and deputation of personnel and other related issues. It is also responsible for framing of policy and giving advise in the matter of appointment in civil service of ex-armed forces personnel and combined competitive examination of different services.

The personnel department is also looking after the departmental examination of officers, constitutions of subordinated service board and there related regulations. The department is also the cadre controlling authority of the Indian Administrative Service and the Provincial Civil Service.

The Allahabad High Court exercises effective control over Higher Judicial Service and Provincial Civil Service-Judicial officers. The power of postings transfers, leave, crossing of efficiency bar, rant of pension in respect of all the officers and promoting munsifs as civil judges is also vested in the high court by virtue of Article 235 of the Constitution of India.

=== Organisations ===
DoAP supervises and controls the following organisations, namely -

- Uttar Pradesh Public Service Commission
- Uttar Pradesh Subordinate Services Selection Commission
- Uttar Pradesh Academy of Administration and Management

== Important officials ==
The Chief Minister of Uttar Pradesh, Yogi Adityanath, is the minister responsible for Department of Appointment and Personnel.

The department's administration is headed by the Additional Chief Secretary, who is an IAS officer, who is assisted by two Special Secretaries, four Joint Secretaries, and nine Deputy/Under Secretaries. The current Additional Chief Secretary (DoAP) is Dr.Deepak Trivedi.

=== Secretariat level ===
Important officials
| Name | Designation |
|---|---|
| Dr. Devesh Chaturvedi, IAS IAS | Additional Chief Secretary |
| Sanjay Kumar Singh, IAS | Special Secretary |
| Arvind Mohan Chitranshi | Special Secretary |
| Dhananjay Shukla | Special Secretary |
| Sheetla Prasad | Special Secretary |

=== Head of department level ===
Heads of department
| Name | Position |
|---|---|
| Sanjay Srinet, IRS | Chairperson of the Uttar Pradesh Public Service Commission |
| Pravir Kumar, retired I.A. S. | Chairperson of the Uttar Pradesh Subordinate Services Selection Commission |
| Kumar Arvind Singh Deo | Director General of the Uttar Pradesh Academy of Administration and Management |
