= D.K. Tiwari =

Indian civil servant

Devendra Kumar Tiwari

State Election Commissioner of Jharkhand
- In office 10 February 2021 – 31 March 2025
- Preceded by: N N Pandey
- Succeeded by: Alka Tiwari

Chief Secretary Government of Jharkhand
- In office 1 April 2019 – 31 March 2020
- Preceded by: Sudhir Tripathi
- Succeeded by: Sukhdev Singh

Personal details
- Born: Devendra Kumar Tiwari; 26 March 1960 (age 66)
- Spouse: Alka Tiwari
- Relatives: R. K. Tiwari (brother)
- Education: King George's Medical University; Ranchi University; University of Manchester
- Occupation: IAS officer, Civil servant

Devendra Kumar Tiwari (born March 26, 1960) is a retired Indian civil servant and a 1986 batch officer of the Indian Administrative Service from the Jharkhand cadre. He served as the State Election Commissioner of Jharkhand from 10 February 2021 till 31 March 2025. Previously, he was the Chief Secretary of Jharkhand, holding the office from 1 April 2019 to 31 March 2020.

== Education ==
Tiwari holds an MBBS degree from King George's Medical University, a Bachelor of Laws degree from Chotanagpur Law College and a Master of Arts in Economics from the University of Manchester.

== Career ==
Tiwari has held several key positions in the Government of Bihar and the Government of Jharkhand. He was District Magistrate and Collector of Kishanganj and Chhapra districts in Bihar. In Jharkhand, he served as Secretary in departments such as Building Construction, Water Resources, and Health, as well as Principal Secretary to the Chief Minister. He has also worked as Principal Secretary (Human Resources and Planning) and Principal Resident Commissioner at Jharkhand Bhavan, New Delhi.

In June 2018, he was appointed as the Development Commissioner of Jharkhand, and in April 2019, as Chief Secretary of Jharkhand, where he served until March 31, 2020.
