= Anup Chandra Pandey =

Indian government official

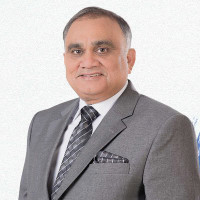

Election Commissioner of India
- In office 9 June 2021 – 14 February 2024
- Preceded by: Sushil Chandra
- Succeeded by: Gyanesh Kumar, Retired IAS Officer

Chief Secretary of Uttar Pradesh
- In office 30 June 2018 – 31 August 2019
- Preceded by: Rajive Kumar
- Succeeded by: Rajendra Kumar Tiwari

Infrastructure and Industrial Development Commissioner of Uttar Pradesh
- In office 9 September 2017 – 31 August 2019

Personal details
- Born: 15 February 1959 (age 67) Chandigarh, Punjab, India
- Occupation: Retired IAS officer

Anup Chandra Pandey (born 15 February 1959) is a retired 1984-batch Indian Administrative Service (IAS) officer belonging to the Uttar Pradesh cadre. He served as Election Commissioner of India. Pandey had also served as the Chief Secretary of the Government of Uttar Pradesh, in addition to serving as the Infrastructure and Industrial Development Commissioner of Uttar Pradesh, before retiring on 31 August 2019. He was Member, National Green Tribunal Oversight Committee, U.P before joining Election Commission.

== Education ==
Pandey holds a Bachelor of Engineering degree in mechanical engineering from Punjab Engineering College, is a Master of Business Administration in Business Management, and has a Doctor of Philosophy degree in Ancient History.

== Career ==
Pandey has served in various key positions for both the Government of Uttar Pradesh and the Government of India, including as the Chief Secretary of Uttar Pradesh, Additional Chief Secretary (Infrastructure and Industrial Development and NRI), chairperson of Udyog Bandhu and Infrastructure and Industrial Development Commissioner of Uttar Pradesh, divisional commissioner of Lucknow division, Additional Chief Secretary (Finance and Institutional Finance) and Finance Commissioner, chairperson of Pradeshiya Infrastructure and Investment Corporation of Uttar Pradesh, chairperson of Greater NOIDA, Principal Secretary (Medical Education), Principal Secretary (Planning) and director general of Uttar Pradesh State Planning Institute and as the district magistrate and collector of two districts of a unified Uttar Pradesh in the Uttar Pradesh government; and as an additional secretary in the Department of Ex-servicemen Welfare of the Ministry of Defence, additional director general in the Bureau of Indian Standards and as a joint secretary in the Ministry of Labour and Employment in the Indian government.

=== Infrastructure and Industrial Development Commissioner of Uttar Pradesh ===
Pandey was appointed the Additional Chief Secretary (Infrastructure and Industrial Development and NRI) and Infrastructure and Industrial Development Commissioner of Uttar Pradesh (IIDC), overseeing the Department of Infrastructure and Industrial Development and the Department of NRI, in September 2017; Pandey assumed the office of IIDC on 9 September 2017, and retired on 31 August 2019.

=== Chief Secretary of Uttar Pradesh ===
Pandey was appointed the Chief Secretary of Uttar Pradesh government in June 2018, succeeding Rajive Kumar; Pandey assumed the office of chief secretary on 30 June 2018 and retired on 31 August 2019.

=== Election Commissioner of India ===
Pandey was appointed as Election Commissioner of India on 8 June 2021. Pandey assumed the office on 9 June 2021 and served their till 14 February 2024.
