= Ranchi University =

Public university in Ranchi, Jharkhand, India

- University Logo
- Other name: RU
- Motto: May nostrum scientia fio splendens
- Motto in English: May our knowledge become brilliant
- Type: Public State University
- Established: July 12, 1960; 66 years ago
- Accreditation: NAAC
- Affiliations: UGC; ACU; AIU
- Budget: ₹899 crore (US$96 million)
- Chancellor: Governor of Jharkhand
- Vice-Chancellor: Dr. Saroj Sharma
- Academic staff: 280
- Administrative staff: 415
- Students: 10,000+
- Undergraduates: 8,460+
- Postgraduates: 2,880+
- Doctoral students: 2,000+
- Location: Ranchi, Jharkhand, India; 23°22′18″N 85°19′27″E
- Campus: Urban
Colours
- Website: ranchiuniversity.ac.in

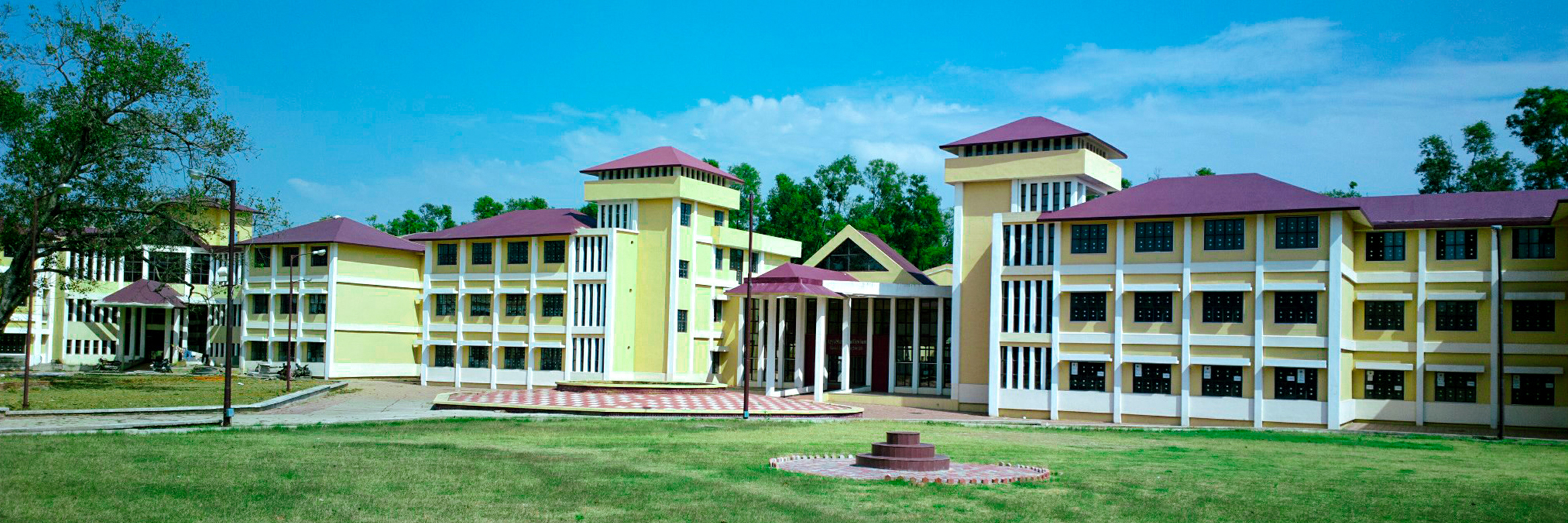
Campus of Ranchi University

Ranchi University is a public state university in Ranchi, Jharkhand, India. It was established in 1960 by an Act of the Bihar legislature. Ranchi University offers degrees in undergraduate, post-graduate, M.Phil. and doctorate programs. It has its jurisdiction over Chotanagpur Division.

== History ==
Before the establishment of Ranchi University, all degree colleges of the present-day Jharkhand (except Santhal Parganas) were affiliated to the Patna University. Ranchi University was established on 12 July 1960, as a teaching cum affiliating university. When the Ranchi University was first established, all degree colleges of present-day Jharkhand came under its jurisdiction. Bishnudeo Narayan Singh was appointed as the first vice-chancellor of this university.

In 1992, Vinoba Bhave University was created by bifurcating the Ranchi University, reducing its jurisdiction area by nearly half. In 2009, the university was further divided to create two more universities: – Nilamber Pitamber University, Medininagar in January 2009, and Kolhan University, Chaibasa in August 2009. At present, Ranchi University has jurisdiction only over the colleges of the five districts of Jharkhand, namely, Ranchi, Gumla, Khunti, Simdega, and Lohardaga.

== Organisation and Administration ==
=== Governance ===
Like most state universities in India, the Chancellor of the university is the governor of the state - the Governor of Bihar until the inception of Jharkhand on 15 November 2000 and the Governor of Jharkhand since then. The chief executive of the university is the Vice-Chancellor.

List of vice chancellors
#	Name	Incumbency	Took office	Left office
1	Bishnudeo Narayan Singh	Permanent	12 July 1960	15 August 1962
2	Sharang Dhar Singh	Permanent	16 August 1962	15 October 1965
-	Hare Krishna Lal	Temporary	16 October 1965	16 November 1965
3	A. F. Markham	Permanent	17 November 1965	26 September 1969
4	George Jacob	Permanent	26 September 1969	21 October 1970
-	Govind Minj	Temporary	22 October 1970	24 December 1970
5	B. N. Rohtagi	Permanent	24 December 1970	24 April 1972
-	Nandeshwar Prasad	Temporary	1 May 1972	14 May 1972
-	K. Abraham	Temporary	15 May 1972	2 September 1972
6	R. S. Mandal	Permanent	3 September 1972	6 November 1975
7	A. K. Dhan	Permanent	7 November 1975	10 January 1977
8	Shaligram Singh	Permanent	11 January 1977	28 August 1978
9	N. L. Nadda	Permanent	31 August 1978	21 April 1980
-	Kumar Suresh Singh	Temporary	22 April 1980	9 July 1980
-	K. C. Bose	Temporary	10 July 1980	16 November 1980
10	A. K. Dhan	Permanent	17 November 1980	14 February 1984
11	Bishwanath Singh	Permanent	15 February 1984	6 November 1985
12	Sachidanand	Permanent	6 November 1985	2 July 1986
-	R. D. Munda	Temporary	2 July 1986	26 January 1987
13	R. D. Munda	Permanent	27 January 1987	10 August 1988
-	S. Patankar	Temporary	11 August 1988	16 December 1988
14	Lal Saheb Singh	Permanent	17 December 1988	24 June 1990
15	A. K. Singh	Permanent	25 June 1990	26 August 1992
16	K. K. Nag	Permanent	26 August 1992	31 January 1996
17	D. P. Gupta	Permanent	1 February 1996	28 November 1997
-	C. R. Laha	Temporary	29 November 1997	2 April 1998
-	S. S. Hussain	Temporary	3 April 1998	3 March 1999
18	L. C. C. N. Shahdeo	Permanent	4 March 1999	4 June 2000
-	Phool Singh	Temporary	13 June 2000	29 November 2000
-	S. S. Hussain	Temporary	26 December 2000	8 April 2001
-	Amit Khare	Temporary	9 April 2001	10 June 2001
-	Amit Khare	Temporary	1 July 2001	10 July 2001
19	L. C. C. N. Shahdeo	Permanent	11 July 2001	3 March 2002
-	Anand Bhushan	Temporary	4 March 2002	31 December 2002
20	S. S. Kushwaha	Permanent	1 January 2003	31 December 2005
21	A. A. Khan	Permanent	1 January 2006	31 December 2011
-	V. P. Sharan	Temporary	1 January 2012	31 January 2012
22	L. N. Bhagat	Permanent	1 February 2012	31 January 2015
-	M. Raziuddin	Temporary	1 February 2015	2 March 2015
23	R. K. Pandey	Permanent	3 March 2015	2 March 2021
-	Dr. Kamini Kumar	Temporary	3 March 2021	20 June 2022
24	Dr. Ajit Kumar Sinha	Permanent	21 June 2022	20 June 2025
-	Dr. Dharmendra Kumar Singh	Temporary	21 June 2025	Incumbent

=== Faculties and departments ===
Different departments of the Ranchi University was organized into three faculties.

- Faculty of Science

This faculty consists of the departments of Mathematics, Physics, Chemistry, Geology, Botany, and Zoology.

- Faculty of Humanities

This faculty consists of the departments of Bengali, English, Hindi, Sanskrit, Tribal & Regional Language, Urdu, and Philosophy.

- Faculty of Social Sciences and Commerce

This faculty consists of the departments of History, Geography, Anthropology, Political Science, Economics, Home Science, Psychology, Sociology, and Commerce.

=== Affiliations ===
Ranchi University is an affiliating university and has jurisdiction over the higher educational institutes of the five districts of Jharkhand: Ranchi district, Gumla district, Khunti district, Simdega district and Lohardaga district. This university has 15 constituent colleges and 29 affiliate colleges under its jurisdiction. These colleges include Medical College, Nursing College, Engineering College, Law College, Institutes of Management, Institute of Psychiatry etc.

== Academics ==
=== Traditional and distance education ===
The university and its affiliated colleges and institutions offer undergraduate and postgraduate courses in different areas like medical, nursing, engineering, liberal arts, etc. Ranchi University generally offers postgraduate courses in liberal arts in own campus; while professional and liberal undergraduate degree courses are offered through the affiliated colleges and institutions. Professional postgraduate courses (like M.Tech., MD, Ms) are also offered through the affiliated institutions. Admission in the undergraduate liberal arts degree courses is mainly based on the result of the higher secondary (10+2) examination. However, for admission in the undergraduate courses of professional subjects like medicine and engineering, one has to take an entrance examination conducted by national agencies (NEET UG or JEE). Admission in the postgraduate courses is based on undergraduate degree results and also the performance of the entrance examination conducted either by the university or by the national agency. The aspirants for research-level programs have to take an entrance examination followed by an interview. Ranchi university also has a Directorate of Distance Education for conducting postgraduate studies in distance education.

=== Libraries ===
Ranchi University has a central library that has collections of more than 1,00,000 books.

=== Ranchi University Museum ===
The department of Anthropology at Ranchi University has a museum that showcases a variety of exhibits including ethnographic collections of central Indian states and Andaman and Nicobar Islands.

=== Ranking and accreditations ===
Ranchi University is recognized under Section 12B of the UGC Act. In 2017, the National Assessment and Accreditation Council (NAAC) awarded 'B+' grade to the Ranchi University.

== Corruption and White Collar Crimes ==
University since its inception has undergone many changes, some were acceptable and others inappropriate. University was unable to audit its financial affairs every year, which made it an easy target for officers and staffs for corrupt practices. It came in light of the Honourable High Court of Jharkhand that the officials were misusing their positions and exploiting the loopholes of the constitution. In 2011, there were instances where registrar and financial officer were engaged in embezzlement of funds provided by UGC for paying arrears to Teaching and Non-Teaching Staff. This was a loss for Ranchi University with accused still on loose. The accused son was arrested, with finance officer still absconding.

In June 2000, the Vigilance Bureau of the Bihar Government arrested its vice chancellor L.C.C.N. Shahdeo for being involved as a mastermind in a racket for appointing undeserving people to the teaching and non-teaching staff of 40 colleges affiliated to the Ranchi University. Student leaders viewed arrest as a politically motivated raid by Vigilance department under the direction of Bihar Government.

D.P. Gupta, the then vice chancellor of Ranchi University, took severe measures to make an audit of Ranchi University books from 1985 onwards. The audit revealed mass scale bungling of exam and registration fees running into crores with university officers colluding with college principals in submitting fake bank challans, payment of bogus T.A. bills worth lakhs of rupees, unlimited over time payments and non maintenance of even cash books over the years. Audit reports revealed financial irregularities and university staff taking help of anti-social elements to terrorise the auditors.

In a meeting of the Public Account Committee of the Jharkhand Assembly held in 2006, Account General (Audit) revealed that heads of various departments, lecturers and non teaching employees of Ranchi University have taken Rs. 6.43 crores as an advance and this amount has not been adjusted to their salaries. In June itself, the RU administration, in response to the matter raised in the State Assembly, instructed the heads of the postgraduate departments and the head of the 34 constituent colleges to submit the expenditure receipts of the advance given to them for conducting examinations. The unaccounted expenses date back to so long that the heads of the departments in whose names the money was issued, have either retired or do not hold those posts any longer.

In April 2007, university administration lodged an FIR against 24 office staff, involved in embezzlement of funds maintained in Pension and Gratuity Account including other heads of accounts by creating fake documents. It was believed that it involved white collared officials as well.

There was also a case, where an external person/non-employee was working in sensitive Examination department for more than nine months without being caught. On every second day there was question paper leak and tapering of answer sheet.

Furthermore, three teachers were appointed in the constituent college of the university who forged their degree certificate and marksheet. It came to the notice of university administration, but no actions were taken. The accused drew salary for 10 years due to lack of efficiency in incompetent authorities.

A scandal got caught where teachers drawing pension, retired prior to 2016, had their salary fixed under 7th Pay Commission by University Administration and State Government paid lakhs rupees to University for illegal payments.

Salary arrear scam came into light when Ranchi University procured Rs. 99.6 Crores for 1013 teachers, but in legal sense 860 teachers would have to be paid arrears. Department of Higher and Technical Education probed the matter through three members committee and found scam did happen. The department has recommended Governor of Jharkhand to take action against the former vice-chancellor Ramesh Kumar Pandey, finance advisor, finance officer and registrar. Scam files went missing from Ranchi University, when Governor of Jharkhand sought progress in action taken against erring officials. Governor has ordered to lodge FIR against erring officers.

Embezzlement of total Rs.4 crores is discovered by auditors of Government of Jharkhand, which pertains to 12 April 2010 amounting Rs.20078683, year 2003-2004 to May 2010 amounting Rs.13198183. Under Ranchi Women's College embezzlement is caught for the year 2006-2007; 2007-2008 amounting Rs.7382531. And under Science & Technology embezzlement is caught for the year 2000-2001; 2001-2002; 2002-2003, 2003-2004 amounting Rs.847823 & Rs.21855.

== Notable alumni ==
- Babulal Marandi, former Chief Minister of Jharkhand
- Kariya Munda, former Deputy Speaker of the Lok Sabha
- D.K. Tiwari, former Chief Secretary of Jharkhand
- Annpurna Devi, Union Minister of Women and Child Development
- Sudesh Mahto, former Deputy Chief Minister of Jharkhand
- Mahua Maji, Member of Parliament (Rajya Sabha)
- Sanjay Seth, Union Minister of State for Defence
- Manish Jaiswal, Member of Parliament (Lok Sabha)
- C. P. Singh (Indian politician), Former Cabinet Minister of Jharkhand
- Deepak Prakash (Politician), Member of Parliament (Rajya Sabha)
- Raghubar Das, Former Chief Minister of Jharkhand
- Aditya Sahu, Member of Parliament (Rajya Sabha)

== See also ==
- University Grants Commission (India)
- Education in India
- National Assessment and Accreditation Council
- University of Calcutta
- Dr. Shyama Prasad Mukherjee University
