= A. A. Khan (academic) =

Indian physicist

- Born: Nauhatta, Saharsa, Bihar, India
- Education: Patna University
- Occupation: Professor

Anwar Ahmad Khan (born 1947), better known as Dr. A. A. Khan, is an Indian physicist. He was the Vice Chancellor of Ranchi University from 2006 to 2011.

== Early life and education ==
Khan was born in 1947 in Nauhatta, Dist- Saharsa. He earned an MSc from Patna University in 1968 and a PhD in electronics in 1977.

== Academic career ==
Khan started his academic career in 1969 as an electronics lecturer in Magadh University. In 1978 he joined Ranchi University where he spent most of his academic career, reaching the positions of Head of the Department of Physics, and then Pro Vice Chancellor in 2004, and Vice Chancellor from 2006 to 2011. He also spent ten-year (from 1983 to 1988 and from 1990 to 1995) at the electrical engineering department at King Saud University.

Academic offices
Preceded by S. S. Kushwaha	Permanent 36th Vice-Chancellor of the Ranchi University; 2006–2011	Succeeded by L. N. Bhagat
