= Ramesh Kumar Pandey =

Ramesh Kumar Pandey is an Indian academic, and the former vice-chancellor of Ranchi University.

== Biography ==
Pandey was born and brought up in Jharkhand (then Bihar). He completed his bachelor's, master's and Ph.D. from Ranchi University. He was a post-doctoral fellow at University of Nottingham. In his 37-year teaching career, he wrote more than 25 research papers.

In 2015, he was appointed as vice-chancellor of Ranchi University. At the time of joining, he talked about his priority:

"My priority is to organize students' union elections. It is only through students' representatives that we come to know about the problems of students. I will talk to the members of all student unions and will finalize a date for the elections as soon as possible."

Academic offices
Preceded by M. Raziuddin	Permanent 40th Vice-Chancellor of the Ranchi University; 2015-2021	Succeeded by Kamini Kumar
