= Manoj Kumar Singh (civil servant) =

Indian civil servant (born 1967)

Special Secretary, Department of Housing and Urban Planning
- Incumbent
- Assumed office 23 October 2021
- Preceded by: Rakesh Kumar Mishra

Personal details
- Born: 23 May 1967 (age 59) Sharif Nagar, Moradabad, Uttar Pradesh, India
- Spouse: Aakaanksha Singh (m. 1997)
- Children: 2
- Education: K.G.K Inter College and Allahabad University
- Profession: Civil servant

Manoj Kumar Singh (born 23 May 1967) is a 2012 batch IAS officer of Uttar Pradesh cadre & is currently the Special Secretary, Department of Housing and Urban Planning in the Uttar Pradesh government.

== Career ==
In 1997, he was selected as PCS officer after attaining 8th rank all over Uttar Pradesh and was promoted as 2012 batch IAS officer in 2019. He first joined as Sub-Divisional Magistrate (SDM) in Udham Singh Nagar district.

He was posted as Registrar at Chaudhary Charan Singh University in 2014 by the state government. After few months of his joining, he was at loggerhead with the University's Vice Chancellor, Vikram Chandra Goel a former DG rank IPS officer. VC relieved him from his post without getting any order from the state government. Later the government objected to it and ordered him to take back relieving order as it was out of his jurisdiction to do so. He replied that being a state university's VC he has autonomy from government and they can refer the matter to Chancellor/Governor of state. This tussle made students protest in the campus.

Later the Registrar appealed his decision to High Court where High Court reject VC's judgement and ordered Registrar to continue his duties. VC then appealed to Supreme Court but couldn't get favourable judgement. Post retirement of Vikram Chandra Goel from CCSU, the state government transferred Registrar as Joint Commissioner at UP Housing Development Board in Meerut.

== Posts held ==
Sr. No.	From	To	Position
1	7 December 1997	28 February 1998	Probationer at UP ATI, Nainital
2	1 March 1998	7 November 1998	SDM, Bijnor
3	8 November 1998	25 August 2000	SDM, Udham Singh Nagar
4	26 August 2000	14 June 2005	SDM, Bijnor
5	15 June 2005	2 July 2007	SDM, Bulandshahr
6	3 July 2007	18 February 2009	SDM, Hathras
7	19 February 2009	12 December 2009	OSD, Aligarh Development Authority
8	13 December 2009	15 July 2011	City Magistrate, Bareilly
9	16 July 2011	19 April 2012	City Magistrate, Prayagraj
10	20 April 2012	14 May 2013	ADM-E, Muzaffarnagar
11	15 May 2013	27 February 2014	Secretary, Muzaffarnagar Development Authority
12	28 February 2014	28 July 2015	Registrar, CCS University
13	29 July 2015	20 September 2015	Joint Housing Commissioner, Meerut Zone
14	21 September 2015	27 May 2017	ADM-E, Muzaffarnagar
15	28 May 2017	27 June 2019	Municipal Commissioner, Meerut
16	27 June 2019	14 July 2020	Municipal Commissioner, Jhansi
17	29 July 2020	8 June 2021	Director, Agriculture Marketing & Foreign Trade
18	8 June 2021	23 October 2021	Special Secretary & Director Tourism
19	23 October 2021	2 September 2023	District Magistrate & Collector, Mahoba
20	2 September 2023	Incumbent	Special Secretary, Department of Housing and Urban Planning

== See also ==
- Kunwar Sarvesh Kumar Singh
- Kunwar Sushant Singh
- Kunwar Bhartendra Singh
