= Uttar Pradesh State Industrial Development Corporation =

Indian state-owned infrastructure company

Uttar Pradesh State Industrial Development Corporation Limited
- UPSIDA

Agency overview
- Formed: 29 March 1961
- Headquarters: Kanpur, Uttar Pradesh
- Minister responsible: Satish Mahana, Minister of Infrastructure and Industrial Development
- Deputy Minister responsible: Suresh Rana, Minister of State for Infrastructure and Industrial Development
- Agency executive: Mayur Maheshwari, IAS, Managing Director
- Parent department: Department of Infrastructure and Industrial Development, Government of Uttar Pradesh
- Website: onlineupsidc.com

Uttar Pradesh State Industrial Development Corporation (UPSIDC), also called a UP State Industrial Development Corporation, is a Public Sector Undertaking (PSU) of the Government of Uttar Pradesh, which promotes industries and develops industrial infrastructure in the State. Its industrial areas are equipped with infrastructure facilities likes roads, drains, internal power lines, street lights, etc.

Corporation has developed 159 Industrial areas (including Uttarakhand) and 23 residential areas encompassing 41948 acres of land with a wide range of infrastructure facilities.

The Corporation comes under the Department of Infrastructure and Industrial Development of the Government of Uttar Pradesh.

== History ==
UPSIDC was incorporated as a company limited by shares on 29 March 1961. Its authorized capital is ₹40 crores and paid-up share capital is ₹24,07,51,000 as of March 2015. It is one of the six infrastructure sector State Public sector enterprises, other five being, Uttar Pradesh State Bridge Corporation Limited (UPSBCL), Uttar Pradesh Project and Tubewell (UPPT), Uttar Pradesh State Road Transport Corporation (UPSRTC), Uttar Pradesh Rajkiya Nirman Nigam Ltd. (UPRRNL) and Avash Vikas Parishad (Housing Development Corporation).

== Functions ==
Uttar Pradesh State Industrial Development Corporation is a Public Sector Undertaking of the Government of Uttar Pradesh. It promotes the development of industrial infrastructure in the state of Uttar Pradesh, it has helped in development of industrial areas, and has delivered iconic industrial areas. The objective of UPSIDC is to provide contemporary infrastructure facilities and services to entrepreneurs setting up businesses and factories in the state of Uttar Pradesh.

Corporation has its head office in Kanpur, Uttar Pradesh and has 21 regional offices across major cities in the State including one in Lucknow.

The Managing Director is the head of UPSIDC. Shri Rajesh Kumar is the current Managing Director of the Corporation.

== Projects ==
- Trans Ganga Hi-tech city, Unnao
- Textile Parks
  - Apparel Park, Tronica City, Ghaziabad
  - Textile & Hosiery Park, Rooma, Kanpur
  - Textile Park, Varanasi
- Agro Parks
  - Agro Park, Barabanki
  - Agro Park, Varanasi
- Leather Technology Park, Banther, Kanpur
- Export Promotion Industrial Parks
  - EPIP, Greater Noida
  - EPIP, Agra
- Industrialization Zone
  - GIDA, Gorakhpur
  - FIDA, Faizabad
  - NIDA, Noida
- Special Economic Zone
  - SEZ, Moradabad
  - SEZ, Bhadohi
- Tronica city, Ghaziabad

== See also ==
- Government of Uttar Pradesh
- Special economic zone
- Free trade zones
