= Phytopathologia Mediterranea =

- Discipline: plant pathology, including etiology, epidemiology, disease control, biochemical and physiological aspects
- Language: English

Publication details
- History: 1967-present
- Publisher: Mediterranean Phytopathological Union (Italy)
- Impact factor: 1.367 (2011)

Standard abbreviations
- ISO 4: Phytopathol. Mediterr.

Indexing
- CODEN: PYMDA
- ISSN: 1593-2095
- OCLC no.: 645361177

Links
- Journal homepage

Phytopathologia Mediterranea is a scientific journal published by the Mediterranean Phytopathological Union, since 1967. It is included in the Journal Citation Reports in the subject category Plant Sciences. The journal publishes original research and reviews in all areas of plant pathology, with special attention to the phytopathological problems of the Mediterranean region.
