= Department of Infrastructure and Industrial Development =

Uttar Pradesh government department

Department overview
- Formed: 2007; 19 years ago (in its current form)
- Preceding agencies: Department of Industrial Development; Department of Infrastructure Development
- Jurisdiction: State of Uttar Pradesh
- Headquarters: Lal Bahadur Shastri Bhawan (Annexy Building), Sarojini Naidu Marg, Lucknow, Uttar Pradesh; 26.838992°N 80.943685°E
- Ministers responsible: Yogi Adityanath, Chief Minister of Uttar Pradesh; Nand Gopal Gupta, Minister of Industrial Development
- Deputy Minister responsible: Jaswant Saini, Minister of State for Industrial Development
- Department executives: Dr. Anup Chandra Pandey, IAS, Chief Secretary of Uttar Pradesh and Infrastructure, Industrial Development Commissioner of Uttar Pradesh and Chairperson of Udyog Bandhu; Rajesh Kumar Singh, IAS, Principal Secretary; Santosh Kumar Yadav, IAS, Secretary and Executive Director of Udyog Bandhu; M. P. Agarwal, Secretary
- Website: Official website

The Department of Infrastructure and Industrial Development, also known as Infrastructure and Industrial Development Department (IIDD) is a department of the Government of Uttar Pradesh. The department was established to create an enabling environment for industrial growth in Uttar Pradesh. It was reconstituted in 2007, after the Government of Uttar Pradesh merged the Department of Industrial Development with the newly created Department of Infrastructure. The department is the responsibility of a cabinet minister of the Uttar Pradesh government, but, its administration is headed by the Infrastructure and Industrial Development Commissioner of Uttar Pradesh, who is an IAS Officer.

== Functions ==
The Department serves as a facilitator of infrastructure development in the state of Uttar Pradesh. The department and its attached organisations develop buildings, expressways and other infrastructure to attract investors to the state of Uttar Pradesh.

=== Udyog Bandhu ===
Udyog Bandhu is a registered society set up by the Uttar Pradesh government to help entrepreneurs who want to invest in the state. It is headed by the state's chief minister. But the daily affairs of the organisation are handled by its chairperson and its executive director, both of whom are IAS officers. The current chairperson of Udyog Bandhu is Anup Chandra Pandey, who also serves as the chief secretary of Uttar Pradesh and the Infrastructure and Industrial Development Commissioner of Uttar Pradesh, whereas, its current executive director of Udyog Bandhu is Santosh Kumar Yadav.

On the divisional level, Udyog Bandhu meetings are chaired by the divisional commissioner of that division, whilst on the district level, Udyog Bandhu meetings are chaired by the district magistrate and collector of that district.

== Sections in the IIDD ==
There are six sections in IIDD, namely Section-1, Section-2, Section-3, Section-4, Section-5, and Section-6, each dealing with matters allotted to it.

== Important officials ==
=== Departmental level ===
Satish Mahana, serves as the departmental minister, and Suresh Rana serves as the Minister of State for Infrastructure and Industrial Development.

The administration of department is normally headed by the principal secretary responsible for it, who is an IAS officer. The principal secretary is assisted by two secretaries, four special secretaries and three joint, deputy or under secretaries. The current principal secretary is Rajesh Kumar Singh.

Presently, the chief secretary of Uttar Pradesh serves as the administrative head of the Department Infrastructure and Industrial Development as the Infrastructure and Industrial Development Commissioner. The current chief secretary is Anup Chandra Pandey.

Important officials
Name	Designation
Dr. Anup Chandra Pandey, IAS	Chief Secretary of Uttar Pradesh and Infrastructure and Industrial Development Commissioner of Uttar Pradesh
Rajesh Kumar Singh, IAS	Principal Secretary
Santosh Kumar Yadav, IAS	Secretary
M. P. Agarwal, IAS	Secretary
Ankit Agarwal, IAS	Special Secretary
Arun Kumar, IAS	Special Secretary
P. K. Pandey, IAS	Special Secretary
Arun Kumar, IAS	Special Secretary

== Autonomous, attached and subordinate bodies ==
The department has attached to it numerous undertakings of the Government of Uttar Pradesh, excluding NOIDA Authority, Greater NOIDA Authority, Yamuna Expressway Authority, the Uttar Pradesh Expressways Industrial Development Authority and the Uttar Pradesh State Industrial Development Corporation. The department has also attached to it a registered society in Udyog Bandhu.

Heads of Public Sector Undertakings and Autonomous bodies
Name	Designation
Dr. Anup Chandra Pandey, IAS	Chairperson of Udyog Bandhu
Dr. Anup Chandra Pandey, IAS	Chairperson of Greater Noida Industrial Development Authority (GNIDA)
Dr. Prabhat Kumar, IAS	Chairperson of Yamuna Expressway Industrial Development Authority (YEIDA)
Alok Tandon, IAS	Chairperson and CEO of NOIDA Authority
Avanish Kumar Awasthi, IAS	Chairman and CEO of the Uttar Pradesh Expressways Industrial Development Authority (UPEIDA)
Rajesh Kumar Singh, IAS	Managing director of the Uttar Pradesh State Industrial Development Corporation (UPSIDC)
