= Department of Housing and Urban Planning =

Government department of Uttar Pradesh state, India

- Āvāsa Evaṃ Śaharī Niyojana Vibhāga

Department overview
- Jurisdiction: State of Uttar Pradesh
- Headquarters: Department of Housing and Urban Planning, Lal Bahadur Shastri Bhawan (Annexy Building), Sarojini Naidu Marg, Lucknow, Uttar Pradesh; 26.8404943°N 80.94444599999997°E
- Minister responsible: Yogi Adityanath, Chief Minister of Uttar Pradesh and Minister of Housing and Urban Planning
- Deputy Minister responsible: Girish Chandra Yadav, Minister of State for Housing and Urban Planning
- Department executive: P. Guruprasad, IAS, Principal Secretary (Housing and Urban Planning)
- Child agencies: Real Estate Regulatory Authority; Uttar Pradesh Housing and Development Board(Avas Vikas Parishad); Awas Bandhu
- Website: Official Website

The Department of Housing and Urban Planning (IAST: Āvāsa Evaṃ Śaharī Niyojana Vibhāga), often abbreviated as DoHUP, is a department of Government of Uttar Pradesh responsible for coordinated and planned development with a comprehensive Master Plan along with the work of various other agencies involved in the creation and extension of urban infrastructure.

The Chief Minister serves as the departmental cabinet minister, and the Principal Secretary (Housing and Urban Planning), an IAS officer, is the administrative head of the department.

== Functions ==
Department of Housing and Urban Planning is responsible for making and implementing laws and policies related to Housing and Urban Planning. The department is also responsible for planned development of urban areas, through the 27 development authorities subordinate to it. The department, through Uttar Pradesh Housing and Development Board, is also responsible for providing affordable housing to those who need it.

== Statutory, Autonomous and Attached bodies ==
- Real Estate Regulatory Authority
- Uttar Pradesh and Housing Development Board
- Uttar Pradesh Metro Rail Corporation
- Chief Town and Country Planner
- Awas Bandhu
- 27 Development Authorities (Agra, Aligarh, Ayodhya, Azamgarh, Baghpat-Baraut-Khekra, Banda, Bareilly, Basti, Bulandshahr-Khurja, Firozabad-Shikohabad, Ghaziabad, Gorakhpur, Hapur, Jhansi, Kanpur, Lucknow, Mathura-Vrindavan, Meerut, Mirzapur, Moradabad, Muzaffarnagar, Orai, Prayagraj, Rae Bareli, Rampur, Saharanpur, Unnao-Shuklaganj, Varanasi)
- 4 Special Area Development Authorities (Shaktinagar, Chitakoot, Kapilvastu and Kushinagar)

== Important officials ==
The Chief Minister of Uttar Pradesh, Yogi Adityanath, is the minister responsible for Department of Housing and Urban Planning.

The department's administration is headed by the Principal Secretary, who is an IAS officer, who is assisted by three Special Secretaries, two Joint Secretaries, and eight Deputy/Under Secretaries. The current Principal Secretary (DoHUP) is Devesh Chaturvedi.

=== Secretariat level ===
Important officials
Name	Designation
Devesh Chaturvedi	Principal Secretary
Mala Srivastava	Special Secretary
Kant Mishra	Special Secretary
Apurva dubey	Special Secretary

=== Head of Department Level ===
Heads of Department
Name	Position
Rajive Kumar	Chairman, Real Estate Regulatory Authority
Sri Balkar Singh	Housing Commissioner, U.P.H.D.B(आवास विकास)
Mala Srivastava	Executive Director, Awas Bandhu
