= Chief Development Officer (India) =

Indian administrative post

The Chief Development Officer is an administrative post in the Indian states of Uttar Pradesh and Uttarakhand and Bihar tasked to oversee various developmental schemes of poverty alleviation and infrastructure creation of the state and central governments. The officer works under the overall supervision and control of the District Magistrate.

== See also ==
- National Rural Livelihood Mission
- Pradhan Mantri Gramin Awaas Yojana
- Mahatma Gandhi National Rural Employment Guarantee Act (MNREGA)
- Members of Parliament Local Area Development Scheme (MPLADS)
