= Uttar Pradesh Public Service Commission =

State government agency

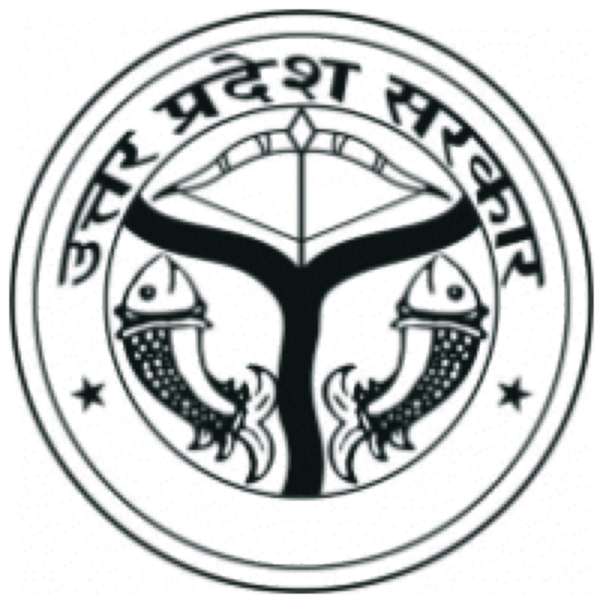
- Abbreviation: UPPSC
- Formation: 1 April 1937; 89 years ago
- Type: Constitutional body
- Purpose: Competitive Examinations
- Headquarters: Prayagraj (UP)
- Location: 10, Kasturba Gandhi Marg, Prayagraj - 211018
- Region served: Uttar Pradesh
- Owner: Government of Uttar Pradesh
- Chairman: Sri Sanjay Shrinet
- Member: Sri Kalp Raj Singh
- Secretary: Sri Ashok Kumar I.A.S.
- Website: uppsc.up.nic.in

The Uttar Pradesh Public Service Commission (Uttar Pradesh Lōk Sēvā Āyōg), abbreviated as UPPSC, is a government body of the state of Uttar Pradesh, India, responsible for the recruitment of candidates for various government jobs, including the Provincial Civil Service (PCS), under the Government of Uttar Pradesh through competitive examinations. It was established by the Constitution of India, as per the provisions of Articles 315 to 323 (Part XIV) of the constitution, titled Services Under the Union and the States, which provide for a Public Service Commission for the Union and for each state.

== History ==
The Uttar Pradesh Public Service Commission (UPPSC) came into existence on 1 April 1937, with the main aim of recruiting candidates to various services in the state. The commission is regulated by Uttar Pradesh Public Service Commission Regulation, 1976.

=== Origin ===
Indianisation of the superior Civil Services became one of the major demands of the political movement compelling the British Indian Government to consider the setting up of a Public Service Commission for recruitment to its services in the territory. Under the Government of India Act 1935, for the first time, provision was made for the formation of Public Service Commissions at the provincial level. Uttar Pradesh Public Service Commission was constituted on 1 April 1937 with its headquarters at Prayagraj. The working of Uttar Pradesh Public Service Commission is also regulated by Uttar Pradesh Public Service Commission Regulation, 1976.

== Functions of UPPSC ==
- Recruitment of the candidates.
1. On the basis of Interview only.
2. On the basis of screening test & Interview.
3. On the basis of Examination only.
4. On the basis of Examination & Interview only.
5. On the basis of Preliminary Examination, Main Examination & Interview.
- Promotions.
- Disciplinary Actions
- Service Rules.
- Advice to the U.P. Government

== Examination Conducted by the Commission ==
List of Examinations Conducted by the U.P. Public Service Commission from time to time. (Direct recruitment through interviews only as per the service):

1. Combined Competitive Examination (Provincial Civil Service)
2. Assistant Conservator of Forest (ACF)/ Forest range officer (FRO) Examinations (Natural Resource)
3. Review Officer (R.O.)/ Assistant Review Officer (A.R.O.) Examination — includes a typing test component for shortlisted candidates (Only for the commission)
4. A.P.S. Examination (Only for the commission and secretariat of U.P. and Revenue)
5. Assistant Registrar Examination
6. Combined State Engineering Examination (Engineering)
7. U.P. Judicial Services (Junior Division) Examination - (PCS-J) (Law)
8. Assistant Prosecuting Officers Examination (Law)
9. U.P. Palika (Centralized) Health Services : Food & Sanitary Inspector Examination (Medical)
10. Dental Surgeon Examination (Screening exam and Interview)
11. Uttar Pradesh state Agriculture Services Examination (Agriculture Science)

== Controversies ==
On 26 September 2013, Allahabad High Court ordered UPPSC to cancel the Mains Examination of UP Provincial Civil Services (Judicial) 2013, over alleged irregularities in the Answer Key issued by it. The word key allegedly had incorrect multiple–choice options marked as correct.

On 29 March 2015, the question paper of the UPPSC PCS Preliminary exam was leaked before the exam. It led to a protest and subsequently, the cancellation of the morning shift exam. The police said that they would find the person who had sold the question paper on WhatsApp for Rs.5 Lakh per copy.

== See also ==
- Uttar Pradesh Subordinate Services Selection Commission (UPSSSC)
- List of Public service commissions in India
