= Interior ministry =

An interior ministry or ministry of the interior (also called ministry of home affairs or ministry of internal affairs) is a government department that is responsible for domestic policy, public security and law enforcement.

In some states, the interior ministry is entrusted with the functions of ensuring national security, immigration issues and protecting places of detention.

Structurally, an interior ministry is part of the highest bodies of executive power and reports directly to the head of government. In states with a federal structure, the ministry often has branches at the level of states or federal subjects.

== Lists of current interior ministries ==
=== Named "ministry" ===
- Ministry of Internal Affairs (Adygea)
- Ministry of Interior Affairs (Afghanistan)
- Ministry of Internal Affairs (Albania)
- Ministry of Internal Affairs (Altai Republic)
- Ministry of the Interior (Argentina)
- Ministry of the Interior (Austria)
- Ministry of Internal Affairs (Azerbaijan)
- Ministry of Interior (Bahrain)
- Ministry of Home Affairs (Bangladesh)
- Ministry of Public Administration (Bangladesh)
- Ministry of Internal Affairs (Bashkortostan)
- Ministry of Internal Affairs (Belarus)
- Ministry of Home Affairs (Bermuda)
- Ministry of Home and Cultural Affairs (Bhutan)
- Federal Ministry of Interior (Bosnia and Herzegovina)
- Ministry of Interior of Republika Srpska (Bosnia and Herzegovina)
- Ministry of Justice and Public Security (Brazil)
- Ministry of Integration and Regional Development (Brazil)
- Ministry of Home Affairs (Brunei)
- Ministry of Interior (Bulgaria)
- Ministry of Public Security of Burundi
- Ministry of Internal Affairs (Buryatia)
- Ministry of Interior (Cambodia)
- Ministry of Internal Affairs (Chechnya)
- Ministry of the Interior and Public Security (Chile)
- Ministry of Civil Affairs (China)
- Ministry of Public Security (China)
- Ministry of Internal Affairs (Chuvashia)
- Ministry of the Interior (Colombia)
- Ministry of the Interior and Security (Democratic Republic of the Congo)
- Ministry of Internal Affairs (Crimea)
- Ministry of the Interior (Croatia)
- Ministry of Public Administration (Croatia)
- Ministry of the Interior (Cuba)
- Minister of Interior (Cyprus)
- Ministry of the Interior (Czech Republic)
- Ministry of Internal Affairs (Dagestan)
- Ministry of the Interior (Denmark)
- Ministry of the Interior (El Salvador)
- Ministry of the Interior (Estonia)
- Ministry of Interior (Egypt)
- Ministry of the Interior (Finland)
- Ministry of Interior (France)
- Ministry of Internal Affairs of Georgia
- Federal Ministry of the Interior (Germany)
- Ministry of Interior (Ghana)
- Ministry of the Interior (Greece)
- Ministry of Citizen Protection (Greece)
- Ministry of the Interior (Guatemala)
- Ministry of Interior and Territorial Communities (Haiti)
- Ministry of Interior (Hungary)
- Ministry of Home Affairs (India)
- Ministry of Home Affairs (Indonesia)
- Ministry of Internal Affairs (Ingushetia)
- Ministry of Interior (Iran)
- Ministry of Interior (Iraq)
- Ministry of Interior (Israel)
- Ministry of Public Security (Israel)
- Ministry of the Interior (Italy)
- Ministry of Internal Affairs and Communications (Japan)
- Ministry of Interior (Jordan)
- Ministry of Internal Affairs (Kabardino-Balkaria)
- Ministry of Internal Affairs (Kalmykia)
- Ministry of Internal Affairs (Karachay-Cherkessia)
- Ministry of Internal Affairs of Kazakhstan
- Ministry of Internal Affairs (Khakassia)
- Ministry of Internal Affairs (Komi Republic)
- Ministry of the Interior and Safety (South Korea)
- Ministry of Interior (Kuwait)
- Ministry of the Interior (Kyrgyzstan)
- Ministry of Public Security (Laos)
- Ministry of Interior and Municipalities (Lebanon)
- Ministry of Interior (Libya)
- Ministry of the Interior (Lithuania)
- Ministry of Home Affairs (Malaysia)
- Ministry of Home Affairs (Maldives)
- Ministry of Internal Affairs (Mari El)
- Ministry of the Interior and Decentralization (Mauritania)
- Ministry of Internal Affairs (Moldova)
- Ministry of Internal Affairs (Montenegro)
- Ministry of Internal Affairs (Mordovia)
- Ministry of Home Affairs (Myanmar)
- Ministry of Home Affairs (Nepal)
- Ministry of the Interior and Kingdom Relations (Netherlands)
- Ministry of Justice and Security (Netherlands)
- Ministry of Interior, Public Safety and Decentralization (Niger)
- Federal Ministry of Interior (Nigeria)
- Ministry of Internal Affairs (North Macedonia)
- Ministry of Internal Affairs (North Ossetia–Alania)
- Ministry of Interior (Oman)
- Ministry of Interior (Pakistan)
- Ministry of the Interior (Peru)
- Ministry of Interior and Administration (Poland)
- Ministry of Internal Administration (Portugal)
- Ministry of Interior, Federal Affairs and Democratization (Puntland)
- Ministry of Public Security (Quebec)
- Ministry of Internal Affairs (Republic of Karelia)
- Ministry of Home Affairs (Solomon Islands)
- Ministry of Internal Affairs (Romania)
- Ministry of Internal Affairs (Russia)
- Ministry of Interior (Rwanda)
- Ministry of Internal Affairs (Sakha Republic)
- Ministry of Interior (Saudi Arabia)
- Ministry of Internal Affairs (Serbia)
- Ministry of Public Administration and Local Self-Government (Serbia)
- Ministry of Home Affairs (Singapore)
- Ministry of the Interior (Slovakia)
- Ministry of the Interior (Slovenia)
- Ministry of Interior and Federal Affairs (Somalia)
- Ministry of Internal Affairs (South Sudan)
- Ministry of the Interior (Spain)
- Ministry of Home Affairs (Sri Lanka)
- Ministry of Internal Affairs, Wayamba Development and Cultural Affairs (Sri Lanka)
- Ministry of Interior (Syria)
- Ministry of the Interior (Taiwan)
- Ministry of Internal Affairs (Tajikistan)
- Ministry of Home Affairs (Tanzania)
- Ministry of Internal Affairs (Tatarstan)
- Ministry of Interior (Thailand)
- Ministry of Internal Affairs of Transnistria
- Ministry of the Interior (Tunisia)
- Ministry of the Interior (Turkey)
- Ministry of Internal Affairs (Turkmenistan)
- Ministry of Internal Affairs (Tuva)
- Ministry of Internal Affairs (Udmurtia)
- Ministry of Internal Affairs (Uganda)
- Ministry of Internal Affairs (Ukraine)
- Ministry of Internal Affairs (Uzbekistan)
- Ministry of Interior, Justice and Peace (Venezuela)
- Ministry of Home Affairs (Vietnam)
- Ministry of Public Security (Vietnam)
- Ministry of Home Affairs (Zambia)
- Ministry of Home Affairs (Zimbabwe)

=== Named "department" ===
- Department of Home Affairs (Australia)
- Department of Justice, Home Affairs and Migration (Ireland)
- Department of Home Affairs (Isle of Man)
- Department of Home (Kerala), India
- Department of Home, Prohibition and Excise (Tamil Nadu), India
- Department of Home, Jail & Disaster Management (Jharkhand), India
- Department of Home (Bihar), India
- Department of Home and Confidential, India
- Department of Internal Affairs (New Zealand)
- Department of the Interior and Local Government (Philippines)
- Department of Home Affairs (South Africa)
- Department of Police (South Africa)
- Department of National Security (Spain)
- Federal Department of Home Affairs (Switzerland)
- Department of Homeland Security (United States)
- Department of Justice (United States)

=== Other names ===
- Federal Public Service Interior (Belgium)
- Public Safety Canada
- Directorate-General for Migration and Home Affairs (European Union)
- Security Bureau (Hong Kong)
- Home and Youth Affairs Bureau (Hong Kong)
- Secretariat of the Interior (Mexico)
- Secretariat of State for Security (Spain)
- Home Office (United Kingdom)

== Historical ==
=== Named "ministry" ===
- Ministry of the Interior and Justice (Colombia)
- Ministry of the Interior (Czechoslovakia)
- Ministry of Interior and Health (Denmark)
- Ministry of Internally Displaced Persons from the Occupied Territories, Accommodation and Refugees of Georgia
- Ministry of the Interior (Hawaii)
- Ministry of Home Affairs (Japan)
- Ministry of Home Affairs (South Korea)
- Ministry of Internal Security (Malaysia)
- Ministry of the Interior (Ottoman Empire)
- Ministry of Interior (Poland)
- Ministry of Public Security (Poland)
- Ministry of Police of the Russian Empire
- Ministry of Interior and Defence (Singapore)
- Ministry of Public Safety and Security (South Korea)
- Ministry of Security and Public Administration (South Korea)
- Ministry of Internal Affairs (Soviet Union)
- Ministry of the Interior (Yugoslavia)

=== Named "department" ===
- Department of Home Affairs (1901–1916) (Australia)
- Department of Home Affairs (1928–1932) (Australia)
- Department of Home Affairs (1977–1980) (Australia)
- Department of Home Affairs and Environment (Australia)
- Department of Home and Territories (Australia)
- Department of Home Security (Australia)
- Department of the Interior (1932–1939) (Australia)
- Department of the Interior (1939–1972) (Australia)

== See also ==
- Home Affairs (disambiguation)
- Interior minister
