= Jharkhand recruitment exam scam =

Jharkhand recruitment exam scam is the scam surrounding paper leak happened in early 2024 and then again in July 2026 for the high profile government recruitment exams in the state of Jharkhand. In August 2026, Chief Minister Hemant Soren cancelled the exams, following the massive protests around Jharkhand, upon which the protestors announcing for CM residence gherao on 20 August.

== Background and timeline ==
- Late 2023 – Early 2024: Initial Leaks & Cancellations, January 28, 2024:- The Jharkhand Staff Selection Commission (JSSC) conducts the Combined Graduate Level (CGL) examination. Within hours, third-paper question sets and answer keys circulate widely across social media and messaging platforms.
- January 31, 2024:- Amid rising outrage, the JSSC officially cancels the entire CGL examination.
- February 2024:- The state government orders a Special Investigation Team (SIT) under the CID to probe the breach. Initial arrests include middle-level operators and suspects linked to Bihar-based examination syndicates.
- Mid to Late 2024: Retests & Legal Battles, September 21–22, 2024:- JSSC re-conducts the CGL exam for over 3 lakh candidates. Shortly after, candidates allege fresh irregularities, citing circulated answer scripts and suspicious candidate groups transported to locations like Bokaro and Nepal prior to the test.
- Mid-2025:- The CID files preliminary reports indicating that question papers were accessed for financial gains prior to the exam. However, the state government reconstitutes the SIT.
- December 2025:- The Jharkhand High Court dismisses a Public Interest Litigation (PIL) seeking a CBI probe, noting a lack of conclusive evidence presented by the newly formed SIT, and directs the JSSC to release the CGL exam results.
- 2026:- CID Breakthroughs, High-Profile Arrests & Scrapping, August 2026:- CID makes major arrests, including Abhay Tiwari (former marketing manager at private vendor agency TDPL and a candidate who secured rank 48 in the same exam). During interrogation, he reveals how papers were leaked from printing partner Webel and candidates were charged up to ₹12 lakh each.
- August 6–10, 2026:- CID arrests multiple high-profile individuals, including former Jharkhand Public Service Commission (JPSC) Chairperson L. Khiangte, for utilizing blacklisted evaluation agencies. Massive student protests and hunger strikes erupt in Ranchi demanding a CBI inquiry.

== Reactions ==
Following the irregularities in the conducting of exam, student organisations such as All India Students' Association (AISA) and others started their protest in Ranchi.

On August 10, 2026, student leader Devendra Nath Mahato called for "Vidhan Sabha Gherao" march to the Jharkhand Legislative Assembly in Ranchi, where Jharkhand Police stopped the protestors enroute and was lathi-charged along with detention. Following which, Mahato was admitted to Sadar Hospital, Ranchi due to police-protestors clash.

Chief Minister Hemant Soren said that he committed to resolving paper leak issue amid students' protests.

The state's primary opposition party, Bharatiya Janata Party (BJP) took the protest to an aggressive level, demanding resignation of Soren, as Chief Minister (who also holds portfolio of Education), along with BJP Jharkhand former President Deepak Prakash and former Chief Minister of Jharkhand and leader of opposition in the assembly, Babulal Marandi demanding CBI probe.

The alliance partner of ruling JMM-led government, Indian National Congress top leadership from New Delhi threatened to withdraw support from the government if no action taken and demands met of the students.

Leader of Opposition and Congress leader Rahul Gandhi also backed the students movement of Jharkhand along with writing letter to CM Soren.

== See also ==
- 2022 West Bengal School Service Commission recruitment scam
- 2026 Punjab recruitment exam scandal
