= 2026 Jharkhand student protests =

2026 student protest movement in Jharkhand

- Part of student protests in India
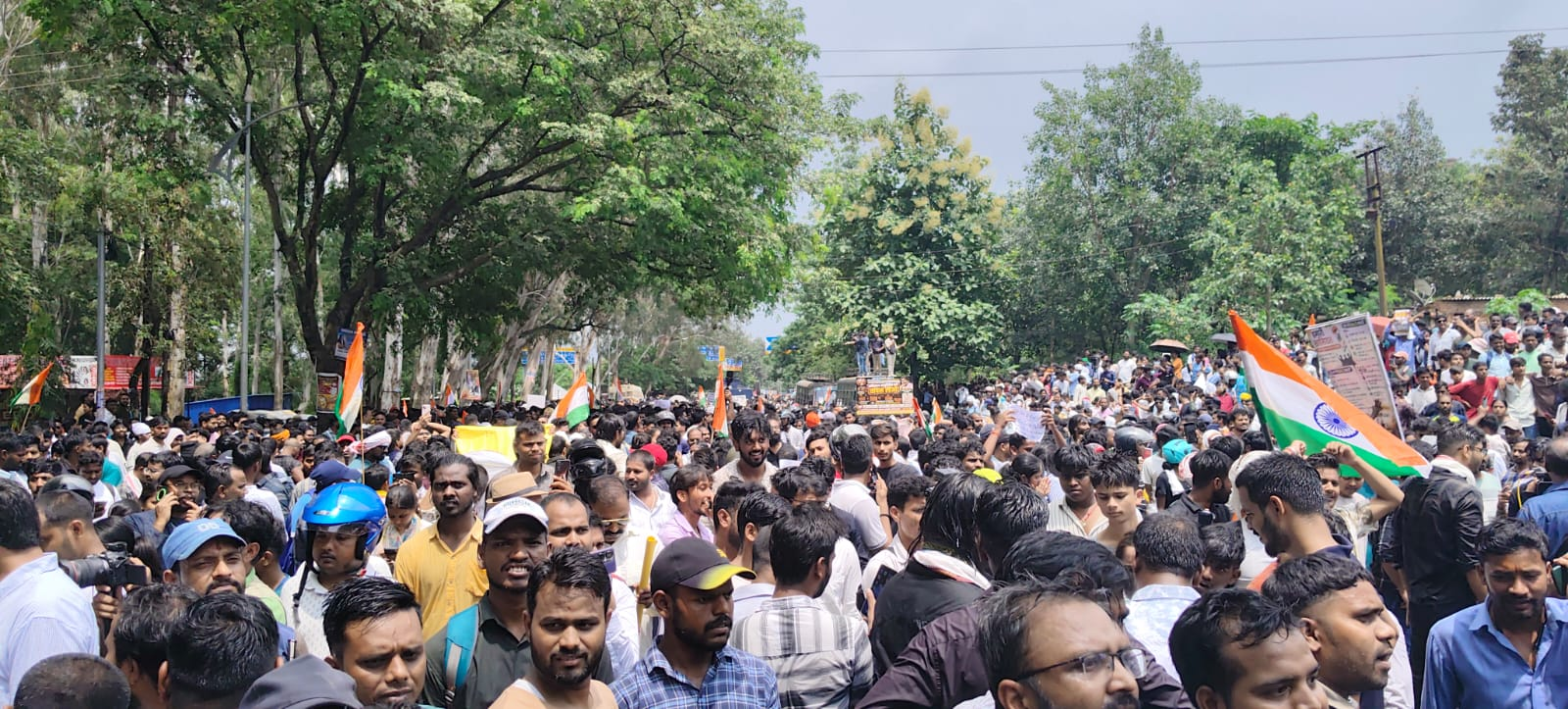
- A large gathering of student protesters and job aspirants demonstrating on the streets of Jharkhand
- Date: 29 July 2026 — 11 September 2026
- Location: Ranchi and other parts of Jharkhand, India
- Caused by: Alleged irregularities in JPSC and JSSC recruitment examinations
- Goals: Cancellation of the 14th JPSC Preliminary Examination; CBI or judicial inquiry into the alleged irregularities; transparent recruitment process
- Methods: Demonstrations, sit-ins, hunger strike, marches and rallies
- Result: State government agreed to cancel three examinations, ED probe into financial irregularities of 14th JPSC exam and resignation of the three JPSC members on 9 August; Cancellation of JSSC-CGL and 21 other examinations, six placed on hold, and 17 put under police investigation on 18 August; Setting up of a committee for suggesting reforms in state examinations; Overturning of cancellations of several examinations by the Jharkhand High Court

Parties
Student protesters: JPSC-JSSC Reforms Manch; JPSC-JSSC Aspirants' Nyay Manch; Support: BJP Jharkhand	Government of Jharkhand: Jharkhand Police; Ranchi Police

Lead figures
Devendra Nath Mahto; Ravindra Paswan; Piyush Kumar Singh	Hemant Soren

Casualties and losses
Multiple students injured	14 police personnel injured (per Jharkhand Police)

The 2026 Jharkhand student protests were state-wide student protests held in Jharkhand, which started over alleged irregularities in the recruitment examinations of Jharkhand Public Service Commission (JPSC) and Jharkhand Staff Selection Commission (JSSC), transparency in the examination management and recruitment process. The candidates in the movement demanded a fair investigation of the controversial examinations, action against the culprits and ensuring a transparent recruitment process. The protests were held mainly in various parts of the state including Ranchi, which included events like dharna, demonstration, padyatra and indefinite hunger strike. The movement also received support from various student organizations, social organizations and many political leaders. One of the major areas of dispute during the protests was the conducting of examinations by TSR Data Processing Private Limited (TDPL), an IT firm which was blacklisted in 2024.

== Chronology ==
- 29 July 2026: Candidates began a sit-in at Ranchi's Jaipal Singh Munda Stadium to protest alleged irregularities in the JPSC exam.
- 2 August 2026: Student leader and Jharkhand Loktantrik Krantikari Morcha (JLKM) leader Devendra Nath Mahto began an indefinite hunger strike to support the protesters.
- 5 August 2026: On the 12th day of the agitation, students announced a Tiranga March and a gherao of the Jharkhand Assembly on August 10.
- 6 August 2026: The monsoon session of the Jharkhand Assembly began amid opposition protests and student agitation over the JPSC-JSSC recruitment exam controversy. Police detained 19 people during the demonstration.
- 7 August 2026: The agitation entered its 14th day. The students' hunger strike continued, an 11-member delegation prepared for talks with the government, and the movement also received political support.
- 10 August 2026: Protesters began the "Vidhan Sabha Gherao" march to the Jharkhand Legislative Assembly, with Devendra Nath Mahto joining them in an ambulance. The Jharkhand Police used lathi charge, tear gas and water cannons to disperse the protesters. Mahto was admitted to Sadar Hospital, Ranchi, after the march due to deteriorating health. The Jharkhand CID meanwhile arrested former JPSC chairperson L. Khinagte over alleged irregularities in the recruitment examinations.
- 11 August 2026: Bharatiya Janata Party – Jharkhand enforced a statewide bandh in protest against alleged "police atrocities" during the student march on 10 August. More than 200 members of the Akhil Bharatiya Vidyarthi Parishad (ABVP) were detained by the police during their attempted march towards the Jharkhand Legislative Assembly to protest the lathi charge against students. A clash was triggered between the group and the police after some ABVP workers tried to stop a van carrying the detained members.
- 15 August 2026: The protesters took out a Tiranga Yatra on the occasion of Independence Day in Ranchi. Mahto stated that the Jharkhand Police forcefully prevented him from joining the procession. The JPSC-JSSC Reforms Manch later demanded the resignation of Hemant Soren, called on INC leader Rahul Gandhi to withdraw from the coalition with Soren, and threatened to besiege the Chief Minister's residence of August 20 if their demands regarding the examinations weren't met.
- 16 August 2026: Protesters burnt effigies of Hemant Soren, Rahul Gandhi and Tejashwi Yadav, the leaders of the parties in the coalition government, in Ranchi and other parts of Jharkhand.
- 17 August 2026: The Jharkhand government agreed to cancel the JSSC-CGL examination and all other examinations conducted by the blacklisted firm TSR Data Processing Private Limited (TDPL) since 2014. Ravindra Paswan, the leader of JPSC-JSSC Reforms Manch, however stated that the protests would continue as their demand of a CBI investigation was not met. Mahto later ended his fast in presence of state ministers Dipika Pandey Singh and Irfan Ansari.
- 18 August 2026: Candidates who had cleared the JSSC-CGL examination held a counter-protest outside the Jharkhand Secretariat building, asking the government to not cancel the examination.
- 19 August 2026: The protest was suspended for two months, with the JPSC-JSSC Reforms Manch giving time to the Jharkhand government to act on their assurances.
- 20 August 2026: After the cancellation of some of the examinations was overturned by the Jharkhand High Court, leaders of the JPSC-JSSC Reforms Manch accused the stage government of deceiving them and threatened to resume the protests. They also announced that they would burn effigies of Soren across Jharkhand on 21 August.
- 21 August 2026: Protesters burnt effigies of Soren and Gandhi. In Ranchi, the protesters clashed with Jharkhand Mukti Morcha (JMM) workers and the Jharkhand Police. JMM also clashed with the protesters in Hazaribagh and Giridih. Mahto stated that the protesters would launch the "Bharti Vyavastha Sudhar Yatra" ("Recruitment System Reform Yatra") on 24 August.
- 24 August 2026: Mahto launched the Bharti Vyavastha Sudhar Yatra under the banner of the JPSC-JSSC Aspirants' Nyay Manch at Nemra village in Ramgarh district, the ancestral home of former chief minister Shibu Soren. The yatra intended to cover all districts of Jharkhand.
- 2 September 2026: A delegation of BJP Jharkhand members gave a 48-hour ultimatum to the state government, demanding withdrawal of all FIRs against all protesters, a CBI investigation into the irregularities in the examinations, action against all members of JPSC and JSSC, as well as FIRs against all JMM workers who attacked the protesters on 21 August, warning that it would otherwise join the protests alongside the students.
- 4 September 2026: The BJP Jharkhand stated that it would hold a four day statewide protest from 8 to 11 September after the government failed to meet its deadline.
- 5 September 2026: The JPSC-JSSC Reforms Manch demanded that the state government withdraw all FIRs against the protesters as well as legal action against police personnel and JMM workers who assaulted the protesters.
- 8 September 2026: BJP Jharkhand launched protests across the state in support of the students protesting against the state government. Party workers led by state president Aditya Sahu, Leader of the Opposition Babulal Marandi, and former chief minister Raghubar Das, also gheraoed offices of deputy commissioners and superintendents of police in five districts.
- 11 September 2026: BJP Jharkhand concluded its four-day agitation, with former Jharkhand chief minister Madhu Koda also taking part in the protests. Mahto also concluded his Bharti Vyavastha Sudhar Yatra in Ranchi during the day, warning of resumption of protests in case of irregularities in the CID investigation.

== Demands ==
The protesting students and candidates placed several demands before the Jharkhand government. These included canceling the 14th JPSC preliminary examination, conducting a CBI or judicial inquiry into alleged irregularities and question paper leaks in the recruitment examinations, ensuring transparency and accountability in the JPSC and JSSC recruitment processes, and adopting a fair and timely process for future recruitment examinations. The protesters also demanded that action be taken against those allegedly involved in the recruitment process and that the interests of eligible candidates be protected.

== Government response ==
In response to the student movement, the Jharkhand government initiated talks with representatives of the protesting students. An 11-member delegation was formed to negotiate between the government and the protesters. During this meeting, the state government pledged to consider complaints related to recruitment examinations and seek solutions through dialogue. Meanwhile, protection was tightened in Ranchi during the protest, and additional police forces were deployed in anticipation of the protests during the monsoon session of the Jharkhand Legislative Assembly.

The activities of TSR Data Processing Private Limited (TDPL), an IT firm which was blacklisted in 2024, are a major focus of the police investigation as it was allowed to conduct the examinations in 2025 and 2026. The Jharkhand Crime Investigation Department (CID) has detained at least 20 individuals in the JPSC investigation against the alleged irregularities, including former JPSC chairperson L. Khiangte and TDPL director Ramvir Singh. Separately, 19 people were arrested in the JSSC-CGL exam investigation by September 2026.

The Jharkhand Police used lathi charge, tear gas and water cannons against protesters on 10 August during their march to the Jharkhand Legislative Assembly. The state police alleged that some of the protesters had turned violent, attempting to break through the barricades and engaging in stone pelting. Three FIRs were filed against 14 named persons and 200 unidentified persons for clashes between the police and the protesters in Ranchi on 21 August. In addition, three FIRs were registered against 39 named persons and 900 unidentified persons for clashes with the police in Giridih and Hazaribagh.

The Jharkhand Government on 17 August agreed to cancel the JSSC-CGL examination as well as all examinations conducted by TDPL since 2014, while announcing that a committee headed by senior IAS officer Amitabh Kaushal would be set up for suggesting reforms in conduction of the examinations in the state. As a result, 22 past examinations were cancelled, six were put on hold and 17 were placed under investigation by the Jharkhand CID.

On 20 August, the cancellations of the 11th to 13th JPSC examinations and the Food Safety Officer examination were stayed by the Jharkhand High Court. On the following day, the court also stayed the cancellations of the JSSC-CGL and the Child Development Project Officer (CDPO) examinations.

== Reactions ==
Various political parties and leaders expressed their reactions to the protests. Opposition parties demanded an impartial investigation into alleged irregularities in the recruitment exams and consideration of the candidates' demands. Several leaders met with the protesting students and expressed their support. Meanwhile, the state government advocated for a solution through dialogue and appealed to the students for talks.

The movement received support from various student organizations, social activists, and political leaders. Congress President Mallikarjun Kharge and Rahul Gandhi expressed concern over alleged irregularities in the recruitment exams and stressed the need to address students' demands and reform the education and recruitment systems. Meanwhile, the state government vowed to continue dialogue with students.

== Impact ==
As a result of the movement, the issue of transparency and fairness of recruitment examinations in Jharkhand became a major topic of statewide political and public discourse. This controversy also led to the issue of alleged irregularities in recruitment examinations being raised prominently in the monsoon session of the Jharkhand Legislative Assembly. During the movement, a dialogue process began between the state government and protesting students, and the students formed an 11-member delegation to negotiate with the government. The movement also sparked widespread discussion about the state's recruitment system, examination management, and the need for reforms.

== Other student protests ==
Inspired by the JPSC/JSSC protest, on 13 August 2026, students of the Government High School in Kandi, Garhwa, protested against JMM to stop the transfer of their acting headmaster Malay Kumar Singh. The students blocked the road and approached district administration demanding that Singh be allowed to remain at the school for his contribution to improving discipline and academics at the school. The district administration then revoked Singh's transfer and allowed him to work at the school.

== See also ==
- Jharkhand Public Service Commission
