= Olkhovsky (inhabited locality) =

Olkhovsky (Russian: Ольховский; masculine), Olkhovskaya (Ольховская; feminine), or Olkhovskoye (Ольховское; neuter) is the name of several rural localities in Russia.

== Modern localities ==
- Olkhovsky, Krymsky District, Krasnodar Krai, a khutor in Kiyevsky Rural Okrug of Krymsky District of Krasnodar Krai
- Olkhovsky, Timashyovsky District, Krasnodar Krai, a khutor in Dneprovsky Rural Okrug of Timashyovsky District of Krasnodar Krai
- Olkhovsky, Kuybyshevsky District, Rostov Oblast, a khutor in Kuybyshevskoye Rural Settlement of Kuybyshevsky District of Rostov Oblast
- Olkhovsky, Ust-Donetsky District, Rostov Oblast, a khutor in Krymskoye Rural Settlement of Ust-Donetsky District of Rostov Oblast
- Olkhovsky, Bolshebabinsky Selsoviet, Alexeyevsky District, Volgograd Oblast, a khutor in Bolshebabinsky Selsoviet of Alexeyevsky District of Volgograd Oblast
- Olkhovsky, Solontsovsky Selsoviet, Alexeyevsky District, Volgograd Oblast, a khutor in Solontsovsky Selsoviet of Alexeyevsky District of Volgograd Oblast
- Olkhovsky, Kumylzhensky District, Volgograd Oblast, a khutor in Popovsky Selsoviet of Kumylzhensky District of Volgograd Oblast
- Olkhovsky, Nekhayevsky District, Volgograd Oblast, a khutor in Sokolovsky Selsoviet of Nekhayevsky District of Volgograd Oblast
- Olkhovsky, Dubovsky Selsoviet, Uryupinsky District, Volgograd Oblast, a khutor in Dubovsky Selsoviet of Uryupinsky District of Volgograd Oblast
- Olkhovsky, Zaburdyayevsky Selsoviet, Uryupinsky District, Volgograd Oblast, a khutor in Zaburdyayevsky Selsoviet of Uryupinsky District of Volgograd Oblast

== Renamed localities ==
- Olkhovsky, former name of Artyomovsk, a town in Kuraginsky District of Krasnoyarsk Krai
