= Olkhovsky =

Olkhovsky (masculine), Olkhovskaya (feminine), or Olkhovskoye (neuter) may refer to:

Places

- Olkhovsky District, a district of Volgograd Oblast, Russia
- Olkhovsky (inhabited locality) (Olkhovskaya, Olkhovskoye), several inhabited localities in Russia

People

- Andrei Olhovskiy (Olkhovsky) (b. 1966), Soviet/Russian tennis player
- Ilya Olkhovsky, elected officer of the Ministry of Internal Affairs of the Republic of Khakassia, Russia
- Yuri Olkhovsky (1930–2009), US supporter of the Soviet dissident movement and retired professor of The George Washington University

== See also ==
- Olkhovka, several rural localities in Russia
