= CID Jharkhand =

Investigation wing of Jharkhand Police

Criminal Investigation Department अपराध अनुसंधान विभाग
- Abbreviation: CID

Jurisdictional structure
- Operations jurisdiction: India
- Governing body: Government of Jharkhand

Operational structure
- Headquarters: Ranchi, Jharkhand
- Parent agency: Jharkhand Police

The Criminal Investigation Department (CID) is a specialised investigation wing of the Jharkhand Police responsible for the investigation of serious and specialised criminal cases in the state of Jharkhand, India. It functions under the Department of Home, Jail and Disaster Management of the Government of Jharkhand.

CID is headed by a senior police officer rank, Additional Director General of Police (ADGP) and operates separately from the regular district police structure for specialised investigations. The department is one of the specialised branches of the Jharkhand Police, alongside units such as the Special Branch and Jharkhand Jaguar.

== Notable cases ==
=== Recruitment examination irregularities case (2026) ===
The CID began investigating alleged irregularities in the Jharkhand Public Service Commission's (JPSC) 14th Combined Civil Services Preliminary Examination following complaints by candidates and a student protest in Ranchi. The investigation subsequently expanded to other JPSC examinations and examinations conducted by TSR Data Processing Private Limited (TDPL), including the Jharkhand Staff Selection Commission (JSSC) Combined Graduate Level examination. The CID conducted raids at the JPSC headquarters, TDPL offices and other locations and arrested several persons, including TDPL marketing manager Abhay Kumar Tiwari, who emerged as a key accused in the investigation. According to reports based on the CID investigation, candidates were allegedly charged about ₹5 lakh at the preliminary stage, with amounts allegedly rising to ₹60–70 lakh for final selection in some cases, separate alleged rates of ₹20–25 lakh for Forest Range Officer, ₹30–35 lakh for Assistant Conservator of Forests and ₹10 lakh for Child Development Project Officer selections have also been reported.

The investigation later reached former JPSC chairman L. Khiangte, who was arrested by the CID on 10 August after being questioned in connection with the alleged irregularities. Several JPSC members were also questioned, while three members resigned during the investigation. Tiwari's disclosures reportedly led investigators to examine alleged financial transactions involving former JPSC officials and intermediaries.

The CID subsequently widened the investigation to the JSSC-CGL examination, alleging that ₹12 lakh had been collected from each of 15 candidates and that 65 questions had been provided to them before the examination. On 18 August, the CID arrested Tiwari's wife and brother, who had reportedly cleared the JSSC-CGL examination, while the JSSC office was also searched and its secretary questioned. The investigation continued amid student protests demanding a CBI inquiry. The state government finally decided to cancel the JSSC-CGL examination and other examinations conducted by TDPL since 2014, that includes 14th JPSC Civil Services Preliminary Examination.

== See also ==
- Jharkhand Police
- Criminal Investigation Department
- Home Department, Jharkhand
