= Mazinsky =

Mazinsky Мазинский
- Khutor
- Location within Volgograd Oblast Location within Russia
- Coordinates: 50°21′N 41°53′E
- Country: Russia
- Region: Volgograd Oblast
- District: Nekhayevsky District
- Time zone: UTC+4:00

Mazinsky (Russian: Мазинский) is a rural locality (a khutor) in Tishanskoye Rural Settlement, Nekhayevsky District, Volgograd Oblast, Russia. The population was 171 as of 2010. There are 12 streets.

== Geography ==
Mazinsky is located 13 km (8.1 mi) southeast of Nekhayevskaya (the district's administrative centre) by road. Artanovsky is the nearest rural locality.
