= Nizhnedolgovsky =

Nizhnedolgovsky Нижнедолговский
- Khutor
- Location within Volgograd Oblast Location within Russia
- Coordinates: 50°31′N 41°40′E
- Country: Russia
- Region: Volgograd Oblast
- District: Nekhayevsky District
- Time zone: UTC+4:00

Nizhnedolgovsky (Russian: Нижнедолговский) is a rural locality (a khutor) and the administrative center of Nizhnedolgovskoye Rural Settlement, Nekhayevsky District, Volgograd Oblast, Russia. The population was 530 as of 2010. There are 13 streets.

== Geography ==
Nizhnedolgovsky is located on the bank of the Tishanka River, on Kalach Upland, 22 km northwest of Nekhayevskaya (the district's administrative centre) by road. Fedosovsky is the nearest rural locality.
