= Melovsky =

Melovsky Меловский
- Khutor
- Location within Volgograd Oblast Location within Russia
- Coordinates: 50°29′N 41°47′E
- Country: Russia
- Region: Volgograd Oblast
- District: Nekhayevsky District
- Time zone: UTC+4:00

Melovsky (Russian: Меловский) is a rural locality (a khutor) in Zakhopyorskoye Rural Settlement, Nekhayevsky District, Volgograd Oblast, Russia. The population was 8 as of 2010.

== Geography ==
Melovsky is located on Kalach Upland, 15 km northeast of Nekhayevskaya (the district's administrative centre) by road. Tushkanovsky is the nearest rural locality.
