= Makhiny =

Makhiny Махины
- Khutor
- Location within Volgograd Oblast Location within Russia
- Coordinates: 50°09′N 41°37′E
- Country: Russia
- Region: Volgograd Oblast
- District: Nekhayevsky District
- Time zone: UTC+4:00

Makhiny (Russian: Махины) is a rural locality (a khutor) in Kruglovskoye Rural Settlement, Nekhayevsky District, Volgograd Oblast, Russia. The population was 25 as of 2010.

== Geography ==
Makhiny is located on the Peskovatka River, 32 km southwest of Nekhayevskaya (the district's administrative centre) by road. Kruglovka is the nearest rural locality.
