= Nekhayevsky =

Nekhayevsky (masculine), Nekhayevskaya (feminine), or Nekhayevksoye (neuter) may refer to:

- Nekhayevsky District, a district of Volgograd Oblast, Russia
- Nekhayevskaya, a rural locality (a stanitsa) in Nekhayevsky District of Volgograd Oblast, Russia
