= Sukhovsky 1-y =

Sukhovsky 1-y Суховский 1-й
- Khutor
- Location within Volgograd Oblast Location within Russia
- Coordinates: 50°25′N 41°49′E
- Country: Russia
- Region: Volgograd Oblast
- District: Nekhayevsky District
- Time zone: UTC+4:00

Sukhovsky 1-y (Russian: Суховский 1-й) is a rural locality (a khutor) in Tishanskoye Rural Settlement, Nekhayevsky District, Volgograd Oblast, Russia. The population was 30 as of 2010. There are 2 streets.

== Geography ==
Sukhovsky 1-y is located on the Kalach Upland, 10 km southwest of Nekhayevskaya (the district's administrative centre) by road. Sokolovsky is the nearest rural locality.
