= Potaynoy =

Potaynoy Потайной
- Settlement
- Location within Volgograd Oblast Location within Russia
- Coordinates: 50°11′N 41°45′E
- Country: Russia
- Region: Volgograd Oblast
- District: Nekhayevsky District
- Time zone: UTC+4:00

Potaynoy (Russian: Потайной) is a rural locality (a settlement) in Rodnichkovskoye Rural Settlement, Nekhayevsky District, Volgograd Oblast, Russia. The population was 3 as of 2010.

== Geography ==
Potaynoy is located 53 km south of Nekhayevskaya (the district's administrative centre) by road. Upornikovskaya is the nearest rural locality.
