= Dinamo, Volgograd Oblast =

Dinamo Динамо
- Settlement
- Location within Volgograd Oblast Location within Russia
- Coordinates: 50°14′N 41°39′E
- Country: Russia
- Region: Volgograd Oblast
- District: Nekhayevsky District
- Time zone: UTC+4:00

Dinamo (Russian: Динамо) is a rural locality (a settlement) and the administrative center of Dinamovskoye Rural Settlement, Nekhayevsky District, Volgograd Oblast, Russia. The population was 965 as of 2010. There are 20 streets.

== Geography ==
Dinamo is located 23 km southwest of Nekhayevskaya (the district's administrative centre) by road. Kamensky is the nearest rural locality.
