= Buratsky =

Buratsky Бурацкий
- Khutor
- Location within Volgograd Oblast Location within Russia
- Coordinates: 50°24′N 41°55′E
- Country: Russia
- Region: Volgograd Oblast
- District: Nekhayevsky District
- Time zone: UTC+4:00

Buratsky (Russian: Бурацкий) is a rural locality (a khutor) in Tishanskoye Rural Settlement, Nekhayevsky District, Volgograd Oblast, Russia. The population was 4 as of 2010. There is 1 street.

== Geography ==
Buratsky is located on the Khopyor River, 18 km (11 mi) east of Nekhayevskaya (the district's administrative centre) by road. Luchnovsky is the nearest rural locality.
