= Verkhnerechensky =

Verkhnerechensky Верхнереченский
- Khutor
- Location within Volgograd Oblast Location within Russia
- Coordinates: 50°28′N 41°36′E
- Country: Russia
- Region: Volgograd Oblast
- District: Nekhayevsky District
- Time zone: UTC+4:00

Verkhnerechensky (Russian: Верхнереченский) is a rural locality (a khutor) and the administrative center of Verkhnerechenskoye Rural Settlement, Nekhayevsky District, Volgograd Oblast, Russia. The population was 655 as of 2010. There are 15 streets.

== Geography ==
Verkhnerechensky is located on the bank of the Tishanka River, 15 km northwest of Nekhayevskaya (the district's administrative centre) by road. Nizhnerechensky is the nearest rural locality.
