= Lobachevsky, Volgograd Oblast =

Lobachevsky Лобачевский
- Khutor
- Location within Volgograd Oblast Location within Russia
- Coordinates: 50°24′N 41°38′E
- Country: Russia
- Region: Volgograd Oblast
- District: Nekhayevsky District
- Time zone: UTC+4:00

Lobachevsky (Russian: Лобачевский) is a rural locality (a khutor) in Verkhnerechenskoye Rural Settlement, Nekhayevsky District, Volgograd Oblast, Russia. The population was 123 as of 2010.

== Geography ==
Lobachevsky is located on the bank of the Tishanka River, 8 km west of Nekhayevskaya (the district's administrative centre) by road. Avraamovsky is the nearest rural locality.
