= Karaichevsky =

Karaichevsky Караичевский
- Khutor
- Location within Volgograd Oblast Location within Russia
- Coordinates: 50°35′N 41°37′E
- Country: Russia
- Region: Volgograd Oblast
- District: Nekhayevsky District
- Time zone: UTC+4:00

Karaichevsky (Russian: Караичевский) is a rural locality (a khutor) in Nizhnedolgovskoye Rural Settlement, Nekhayevsky District, Volgograd Oblast, Russia. The population was 35 as of 2010. There are 2 streets.

== Geography ==
Karaichevsky is located on Kalach Upland, 33 km north of Nekhayevskaya (the district's administrative centre) by road. Bereznyagovsky is the nearest rural locality.
