= Ostryakovsky =

Ostryakovsky Остряковский
- Khutor
- Location within Volgograd Oblast Location within Russia
- Coordinates: 50°34′N 41°48′E
- Country: Russia
- Region: Volgograd Oblast
- District: Nekhayevsky District
- Time zone: UTC+4:00

Ostryakovsky (Russian: Остряковский) is a rural locality (a khutor) in Lukovskoye Rural Settlement, Nekhayevsky District, Volgograd Oblast, Russia. The population was 40 as of 2010.

== Geography ==
Ostryakovsky is located 26 km north of Nekhayevskaya (the district's administrative centre) by road. Lukovskaya is the nearest rural locality.
