= Krasnopolye, Volgograd Oblast =

Krasnopolye Краснополье
- Selo
- Location within Volgograd Oblast Location within Russia
- Coordinates: 50°29′N 41°27′E
- Country: Russia
- Region: Volgograd Oblast
- District: Nekhayevsky District
- Time zone: UTC+4:00

Krasnopolye (Russian: Краснополье) is a rural locality (a selo) and the administrative center of Krasnopolskoye Rural Settlement, Nekhayevsky District, Volgograd Oblast, Russia. The population was 453 as of 2010. There are 9 streets.

== Geography ==
Krasnopolye is located on 26 km northwest of Nekhayevskaya (the district's administrative centre) by road. Manino is the nearest rural locality.
