= Avraamovsky =

Avraamovsky Авраамовский
- Khutor
- Location within Volgograd Oblast Location within Russia
- Coordinates: 50°23′N 41°36′E
- Country: Russia
- Region: Volgograd Oblast
- District: Nekhayevsky District
- Time zone: UTC+4:00

Avraamovsky (Russian: Авраамовский) is a rural locality (a khutor) in Verkhnerechenskoye Rural Settlement, Nekhayevsky District, Volgograd Oblast, Russia. The population was 148 as of 2010.

== Geography ==
Avraamovsky is located on the bank of the Tishanka River, 11 km (6.8 mi) west of Nekhayevskaya (the district's administrative centre) by road. Markovsky is the nearest rural locality.
