= Dyakonovsky =

Dyakonovsky Дьяконовский
- Khutor
- Location within Volgograd Oblast Location within Russia
- Coordinates: 50°26′N 41°53′E
- Country: Russia
- Region: Volgograd Oblast
- District: Nekhayevsky District
- Time zone: UTC+4:00

Dyakonovsky (Russian: Дьяконовский) is a rural locality (a khutor) in Tishanskoye Rural Settlement, Nekhayevsky District, Volgograd Oblast, Russia. The population was four as of 2010.

== Geography ==
Dyakonovsky is located 13 km (8.1 mi) northeast of Nekhayevskaya (the district's administrative centre) by road. Klyuchansky is the nearest rural locality.
