= Denisovsky =

Denisovsky Денисовский
- Khutor
- Location within Volgograd Oblast Location within Russia
- Coordinates: 50°11′N 41°56′E
- Country: Russia
- Region: Volgograd Oblast
- District: Nekhayevsky District
- Time zone: UTC+4:00

Denisovsky (Russian: Денисовский) is a rural locality (a khutor) in Upornikovskoye Rural Settlement, Nekhayevsky District, Volgograd Oblast, Russia. The population was 143 as of 2010. There are 5 streets.

== Geography ==
Denisovsky is located 35 km southeast of Nekhayevskaya (the district's administrative centre) by road. Rechensky is the nearest rural locality.
