= Nizhnerechensky =

Nizhnerechensky Нижнереченский
- Khutor
- Location within Volgograd Oblast Location within Russia
- Coordinates: 50°27′N 41°35′E
- Country: Russia
- Region: Volgograd Oblast
- District: Nekhayevsky District
- Time zone: UTC+4:00

Nizhnerechensky (Russian: Нижнереченский) is a rural locality (a khutor) in Verkhnerechenskoye Rural Settlement, Nekhayevsky District, Volgograd Oblast, Russia. The population was 80 as of 2010.

== Geography ==
Nizhnerechensky is located on the bank of the Tishanka River, 17 km northwest of Nekhayevskaya (the district's administrative centre) by road. Verkhnerechensky is the nearest rural locality.
