= Artanovsky =

Artanovsky Артановский
- Khutor
- Location within Volgograd Oblast Location within Russia
- Coordinates: 50°20′N 41°55′E
- Country: Russia
- Region: Volgograd Oblast
- District: Nekhayevsky District
- Time zone: UTC+4:00

Artanovsky (Russian: Артановский) is a rural locality (a khutor) in Tishanskoye Rural Settlement, Nekhayevsky District, Volgograd Oblast, Russia. The population was 225 as of 2010. There are 10 streets.

== Geography ==
Artanovsky is located on the Tishanka River, 16 km (9.9 mi) southeast of Nekhayevskaya (the district's administrative centre) by road. Krasnovsky is the nearest rural locality.
