= Zakhopyorsky =

Zakhopyorsky Захопёрский
- Khutor
- Location within Volgograd Oblast Location within Russia
- Coordinates: 50°29′N 41°55′E
- Country: Russia
- Region: Volgograd Oblast
- District: Nekhayevsky District
- Time zone: UTC+4:00

Zakhopyorsky (Russian: Захопёрский) is a rural locality (a khutor) and the administrative center of Zakhopyorskoye Rural Settlement, Nekhayevsky District, Volgograd Oblast, Russia. The population was 492 as of 2010. There are 6 streets.

== Geography ==
Zakhopyorsky is located on the right bank of the Khopyor River, 18 km southwest of Nekhayevskaya (the district's administrative centre) by road. Atamanovsky is the nearest rural locality.
