= Rodnichki =

Rodnichki Роднички
- Settlement
- Location within Volgograd Oblast Location within Russia
- Coordinates: 50°07′N 41°40′E
- Country: Russia
- Region: Volgograd Oblast
- District: Nekhayevsky District
- Time zone: UTC+4:00

Rodnichki (Russian: Роднички) is a rural locality (a settlement) and the administrative center of Rodnichkovskoye Rural Settlement, Nekhayevsky District, Volgograd Oblast, Russia. The population was 921 as of 2010. There are 13 streets.

== Geography ==
Rodnichki is located on Kalach Upland, 39 km south of Nekhayevskaya (the district's administrative centre) by road. Kruglovka is the nearest rural locality.
