= Kamensky, Nekhayevsky District, Volgograd Oblast =

Kamensky Каменский
- Khutor
- Location within Volgograd Oblast Location within Russia
- Coordinates: 50°12′N 41°36′E
- Country: Russia
- Region: Volgograd Oblast
- District: Nekhayevsky District
- Time zone: UTC+4:00

Kamensky (Russian: Каменский) is a rural locality (a khutor) in Kruglovskoye Rural Settlement, Nekhayevsky District, Volgograd Oblast, Russia. The population was 155 as of 2010. There are 5 streets.

== Geography ==
Kamensky is located 30 km southwest of Nekhayevskaya (the district's administrative centre) by road. Dinamo is the nearest rural locality.
