= Lukovskaya =

Lukovskaya Луковская
- Stanitsa
- Location within Volgograd Oblast Location within Russia
- Coordinates: 50°34′N 41°51′E
- Country: Russia
- Region: Volgograd Oblast
- District: Nekhayevsky District
- Time zone: UTC+4:00

Lukovskaya (Russian: Луковская) is a rural locality (a stanitsa) and the administrative center of Lukovskoye Rural Settlement, Nekhayevsky District, Volgograd Oblast, Russia. The population was 533 as of 2010. There are 15 streets.

== Geography ==
Lukovskaya is located on the right bank of the Khopyor River, 29 km northeast of Nekhayevskaya (the district's administrative centre) by road. Ostryakovsky is the nearest rural locality.
