= Khoroshensky =

Khoroshensky Хорошенский
- Khutor
- Location within Volgograd Oblast Location within Russia
- Coordinates: 50°17′N 41°44′E
- Country: Russia
- Region: Volgograd Oblast
- District: Nekhayevsky District
- Time zone: UTC+4:00

Khoroshensky (Russian: Хорошенский) is a rural locality (a khutor) in Upornikovskoye Rural Settlement, Nekhayevsky District, Volgograd Oblast, Russia. The population was 110 as of 2010. There are 3 streets.

== Geography ==
Khoroshensky is located on the Kalach Upland, on the Akishevka River, 17 km south of Nekhayevskaya (the district's administrative centre) by road. Pankinsky is the nearest rural locality.
