= Krasnovsky =

Krasnovsky Красновский
- Khutor
- Location within Volgograd Oblast Location within Russia
- Coordinates: 50°19′N 41°57′E
- Country: Russia
- Region: Volgograd Oblast
- District: Nekhayevsky District
- Time zone: UTC+4:00

Krasnovsky (Russian: Красновский) is a rural locality (a khutor) in Tishanskoye Rural Settlement, Nekhayevsky District, Volgograd Oblast, Russia. The population was 72 as of 2010. There are 5 streets.

== Geography ==
Krasnovsky is located on the right bank of the Khopyor River, 19 km southeast of Nekhayevskaya (the district's administrative centre) by road. Artanovsky is the nearest rural locality.
