= Pankinsky =

Pankinsky Панькинский
- Khutor
- Location within Volgograd Oblast Location within Russia
- Coordinates: 50°15′N 41°48′E
- Country: Russia
- Region: Volgograd Oblast
- District: Nekhayevsky District
- Time zone: UTC+4:00

Pankinsky (Russian: Панькинский) is a rural locality (a khutor) in Upornikovskoye Rural Settlement, Nekhayevsky District, Volgograd Oblast, Russia. The population was 155 as of 2010. There are 2 streets.

== Geography ==
Pankinsky is located between Akishevka River and 18K-6 Track, 23 km southeast of Nekhayevskaya (the district's administrative centre) by road. Upornikovskaya is the nearest rural locality.
