= Kulichki =

Kulichki Кулички
- Khutor
- Location within Volgograd Oblast Location within Russia
- Coordinates: 50°07′N 41°45′E
- Country: Russia
- Region: Volgograd Oblast
- District: Nekhayevsky District
- Time zone: UTC+4:00

Kulichki (Russian: Кулички) is a rural locality (a khutor) in Rodnichkovskoye Rural Settlement, Nekhayevsky District, Volgograd Oblast, Russia. The population was 88 as of 2010. There are 4 streets.

== Geography ==
Kulichki is located on Kalach Upland, 47 km south of Nekhayevskaya (the district's administrative centre) by road. Rodnichki is the nearest rural locality.
