= Tushkanovsky =

Tushkanovsky Тушкановский
- Khutor
- Location within Volgograd Oblast Location within Russia
- Coordinates: 50°31′N 41°49′E
- Country: Russia
- Region: Volgograd Oblast
- District: Nekhayevsky District
- Time zone: UTC+4:00

Tushkanovsky (Russian: Тушкановский) is a rural locality (a khutor) in Zakhopyorskoye Rural Settlement, Nekhayevsky District, Volgograd Oblast, Russia. The population was 215 as of 2010.

== Geography ==
Tushkanovsky is located on Kalach Upland, 23 km north of Nekhayevskaya (the district's administrative centre) by road. Rodnikovsky is the nearest rural locality.
