= Dryaglovsky =

Dryaglovsky Дрягловский
- Khutor
- Location within Volgograd Oblast Location within Russia
- Coordinates: 50°39′N 41°30′E
- Country: Russia
- Region: Volgograd Oblast
- District: Nekhayevsky District
- Time zone: UTC+4:00

Dryaglovsky (Russian: Дрягловский) is a rural locality (a khutor) in Uspenskoye Rural Settlement, Nekhayevsky District, Volgograd Oblast, Russia. The population was 12 as of 2010.

== Geography ==
Dryaglovsky is located on the Kalach Upland, 45 km northwest of Nekhayevskaya (the district's administrative centre) by road. Uspenka is the nearest rural locality.
