= Sychyovsky (rural locality) =

Sychyovsky/Sychevsky (Russian: Сычёвский; masculine), Sychyovskaya/Sychevskaya (Сычёвская; feminine), or Sychyovskoye/Sychevskoye (Сычёвское; neuter) is the name of several rural localities in Russia:

- Sychevsky, Stavropol Krai, a khutor in Prikalaussky Selsoviet of Petrovsky District of Stavropol Krai
- Sychevsky, Nekhayevsky District, Volgograd Oblast, a khutor in Upornikovsky Selsoviet of Nekhayevsky District of Volgograd Oblast
- Sychevsky, Uryupinsky District, Volgograd Oblast, a khutor in Vishnyakovsky Selsoviet of Uryupinsky District of Volgograd Oblast
