= Olkhovsky, Nekhayevsky District, Volgograd Oblast =

Olkhovsky Ольховский
- Khutor
- Location within Volgograd Oblast Location within Russia
- Coordinates: 50°27′N 41°53′E
- Country: Russia
- Region: Volgograd Oblast
- District: Nekhayevsky District
- Time zone: UTC+4:00

Olkhovsky (Russian: Ольховский) is a rural locality (a khutor) in Tishanskoye Rural Settlement, Nekhayevsky District, Volgograd Oblast, Russia. The population was 21 as of 2010.

== Geography ==
Olkhovsky is located 12 km northeast of Nekhayevskaya (the district's administrative centre) by road. Atamanovsky is the nearest rural locality.
