= Kazan Police =

Local police force of Kazan, Russia

Main Department of Internal Affairs of Kazan
- Common name: Kazan Police
- Abbreviation: UVD Kazan
- Motto: служа закону, Служим народу serve the law, Serve the people

Agency overview
- Preceding agency: Municipal Police

Jurisdictional structure
- Operations jurisdiction: Kazan, Kazan, Russia
- Legal jurisdiction: As per operations jurisdiction
- Governing body: MVD
- General nature: Local civilian police

Operational structure
- Headquarters: K. Marx Street 21, Kazan
- Police Chief responsible: Valery Krasilnikov
- Parent agency: MVD
- Units: List: Aviation; Crime Scene; Criminal Investigations Department; State Traffic Police

Website
- Official Site

The Main Department of Internal Affairs of Kazan (Russian: Управление МВД РФ по г.Казани) or just Kazan Police (Russian: полиции Казани), is the largest municipal police force in Tatarstan with primary responsibilities in law enforcement and investigation within the Kazan City. The Police is the third largest police department established in Russia (after Moscow Police and Saint Petersburg Police). It has its headquarters in Karl Marx 21 Street, in central Kazan.

The Main Department of Internal Affairs is the Kazan's executive agency, part of the system of Internal Affairs of Russian Ministry of Internal Affairs, the police public safety is also subordinate to the Kazan Municipality. The main responsibilities are the internal security, human rights and freedoms, suppression and detection of crime, and protection of public order.

The Police department headed by the chief, who appoints and removes from office on Ministerial decree by the Ministry of Internal Affairs on the recommendation of the Mayor of Kazan. Before he suggest a nomination, the Internal Minister turns the view of Kazan Mayor. The Control over the activities of the police are carried out by the Ministry of Internal Affairs of the Russian Federation, the Mayor, the Municipality of Kazan and the Kazan City Duma.

The Municipal police force was established in 1977. Before that date the duties of law enforcement in Kazan was under the direct responsibility of The Ministry of Internal Affairs. Currently police chief is Valery Krasilnikov (Since 2010).

== History ==
The Kazan municipal police was established in 1977, as part of the executive council of Kazan city, while the MVD remains as a supportive body. The police have been re-organised multiple times.

On 1991 several departments were formed, the Economic Crimes Department and the Department against Organised Crime. In recent years the police have been criticized for brutality levels. Following the death of a detained man, the police chief was replaced; Valery Krasilnikov was appointed in place of Alexey Selivanovskiy as the Head of Kazan's Police.

In July 2013 the police took part along with FSB in the security arrangements for the 2013 Summer Universiade, the biggest sports event in Russia since the 1980 Summer Olympics.

== Chief of Kazan Police ==
- Zagfar Khaliullin (1977–1981)
- Marcel Ainutdinov (1981–1985)
- Dilus Minnullin (1985–1988)
- Iskander Galimov (1988–1993)
- Nurgayan Akbarov (1993–1998)
- Evgeny Davletshin (1998–2003)
- Fayaz Shabayev (2003–2006)
- Alexey Selivanovskiy (2006–2010)
- Valery Krasilnikov (2010–2016)
- Alexey Sokolov (2016–2019)
- Alexander Mishikhin (since 2019)

== Structure ==
=== Territorial Divisions ===
- Kazan Metro Police Department
- K-9 Center
- Police Patrol Regiment
- Traffic Police Regiment
- Team special of the Patrol Police (for mass events) of the Kazan Police Department
- Special police unit GROM
- Aviastroitel District
  - Aviastroitelniy Police Station 1th
- Vakhtovskiy District
  - Yapeeva police Station 16th
- Kirov District
  - Near-River Police Station 3rd
  - Yudino Police Station 4th
- Moscow District
  - Moscow Police Station 5th
  - Voskhod Police Station 11th
- New Savin District
  - Savinovo Police Station 6th
  - Ggarin Police Station 7th
  - Yamashev Police Station 17th
- Near-Volga District
  - Gorky Police Station 8th
  - Safiullina Police Station 9th
    - Tankodrom Police Station 15th
  - Industrial Police Station 10th
- Soviet District
- Guard Police Station 12th
- Azino-2 Police Station 13th
- Derbyshky Police Station 14th

== See also ==
- Police of Russia
- Saint Petersburg Police
- Moscow Police
