= Sychevsky, Nekhayevsky District, Volgograd Oblast =

Sychevsky Сычёвский
- Khutor
- Location within Volgograd Oblast Location within Russia
- Coordinates: 50°20′N 41°45′E
- Country: Russia
- Region: Volgograd Oblast
- District: Nekhayevsky District
- Time zone: UTC+4:00

Sychevsky (Russian: Сычёвский) is a rural locality (a khutor) in Upornikovskoye Rural Settlement, Nekhayevsky District, Volgograd Oblast, Russia. The population was 9 as of 2010.

== Geography ==
Sychevsky is located 8 km south of Nekhayevskaya (the district's administrative centre) by road. Nekhayevskaya is the nearest rural locality.
