= Sychyovsky =

Sychyovsky/Sychevsky (masculine), Sychyovskaya/Sychevskaya (feminine), or Sychyovskoye/Sychevskoye (neuter) may refer to:

- Sychyovsky District, a district of Smolensk Oblast, Russia
- Sychyovskoye Urban Settlement, an administrative division and a municipal formation which the town of Sychyovka in Sychyovsky District of Smolensk Oblast, Russia is incorporated as
- Sychyovsky (rural locality) (Sychyovskaya, Sychyovskoye), several rural localities in Russia
