= Ranchi Police =

Ranchi Police रांची पुलिस

Jurisdictional structure
- Operations jurisdiction: Ranchi, Jharkhand, India
- Area: 197 square kilometres (76 sq mi)
- Population: 1,126,720 (2011)
- Legal jurisdiction: Ranchi
- Governing body: Government of Jharkhand
- General nature: Local civilian police

Operational structure
- Overseen by: Home Department, Government of Jharkhand
- Headquarters: Kutchery Chowk, Ahirtoli, Ranchi, Jharkhand - 834001
- Agency executive: Rakesh Ranjan, IPS, Senior Superintendent of Police
- Parent agency: Jharkhand Police

Website
- www.jhpolice.gov.in/ranchi

Ranchi Police (रांची पुलिस) is the police force responsible for law enforcement and maintenance of public order in Ranchi, the capital of Jharkhand, India. It operates under the part of the Jharkhand Police and is headed by the Senior Superintendent of Police (SSP), Ranchi.

The SSP, Ranchi also heads the wider Ranchi district police administration, which includes separate arrangements for city, rural and traffic policing.

== Organisation ==
Ranchi district police is organised into police stations, outposts and specialised units. The district administration lists 45 police stations in the district.

=== Ranchi metropolitan area ===
The Ranchi urban agglomeration covers 197 square kilometres (76 sq mi) and had a population of 1,126,720 in 2011.

Police stations serving the urban area include:

- Argora
- Bariatu
- Chutia
- Daily Market
- Gonda
- Hindpiri
- Jagannathpur
- Kotwali
- Lalpur
- Lower Bazar
- Mahila
- Sadar
- Sukhdeo Nagar
- Namkum
- Pundag

Outposts include BIT Mesra, Pandra and Tupudana.

=== Rural area ===
The rural police organisation is headed by the SP (Rural) under the overall supervision of the SSP, Ranchi. It comprises police stations serving the rural areas of Ranchi district.

=== Traffic and specialised units ===
Traffic policing is headed by the SP (Traffic). The district also has specialised units including the Mahila Police Station and SC/ST Police Station.

== See also ==
- Jharkhand Police
- Ranchi district
- Ranchi
- Ranchi Municipal Corporation
