= Ministry of Internal Affairs (Adygea) =

МВД по Республике Адыгея Adygea's Interior Ministry
- MVD logo
- Common name: Adygea Police
- Motto: служа закону, Служим народу by serving the law, we serve the people

Jurisdictional structure
- Legal jurisdiction: Adygea
- General nature: Local civilian police

Operational structure
- Headquarters: Maykop
- Agency executive: Alexander Rechisky, Interior Minister
- Parent agency: MVD
- Units: List: Criminal Investigative Department; Maritime Police; Dagestani Federal Migatory Service; Traffic Police; OMON Special Force; Air Division

Website
- Official Site

Ministry of Internal Affairs of Adygea (Министерство внутренних дел по Республике Адыгея) is the interior ministry of Adygea in southwest Russia. The Ministry is headquartered in 25 Zhukovsky Street in Maykop. The currently minister is Alexandre Rechisky.

== History ==
The Militsiya in Adygea was formed on January 20, 1918 with the establishment of the Maykop City Police.

On April 14, 1918 The People's Commissariat for Internal Affairs (Народный комиссариат внутренних дел) was created as the Main Policing body.

On Jule 27, 1922 the Police of Adygea was established as the Adygea Oblast Militsiya.

In May 1992 the Directorate for Internal Affairs of Adygea (Управление внутренних дел Адыгейского облисполкома) was reorganized as Ministry for Internal Affairs of Adygea (Министерство внутренних дел Республики Адыгея). Vladimir Mikhnenko was the first minister.

In 2012 the Adygea's police celebrated his 90th anniversary.

== Structure ==
- Regional Interior Ministry
  - Inspection
  - Administration
  - Internal Security Operations
  - Control
  - Law Division
  - Information and Foreign Relations
  - Records and treatment Dept.
  - Stuff Dept.
  - Professional Training Center
  - Mobilization
- Deputy Minister - Chief of Police
  - Deputy Chief of Police for Operations
  - Deputy Chief of Police for Public Security
  - Deputy Chief of Police

=== Regional Divisions ===
    - Maykop City Police Department
    - Maykop Region Police Dept.
    - Takhtaouksk Region Police Dept.
    - Gyaginsk Region Police Dept.
    - Krasnogvardeiysk Region Police Dept.
    - Adygea Inter-Municipal Police Department
    - Koshekhabell Inter-Municipal Police Department
