= Ministry of Internal Affairs (Altai Republic) =

МВД по Республике Алтай Altai Republic's Interior Ministry
- Abbreviation: МВД по РА
- Motto: служа закону, Служим народу by serving the law, we serve the people

Jurisdictional structure
- Operations jurisdiction: Russia
- General nature: Local civilian police

Operational structure
- Headquarters: Gorno-Altaysk
- Agency executive: Alexander Udovenko, Interior Minister
- Parent agency: MVD
- Units: List: Criminal Investigative Department; Maritime Police; Federal Migatory Service; Traffic Police; OMON Special Force; Air Division

Website
- Official Site

The Ministry of Internal Affairs of Altai Republic (Russian: Министерство внутренних дел по Республике Алтай) is the internal security ministry of the Altai Republic in southern Russia. The Ministry is headquartered in 25 Zhukovsky Street in Gorno-Altaysk city.

The current minister is Alexander Udovenko.

== Structure ==
- Information Center (Информационный центр)
- Licenses and Permits (Группа лицензионно-разрешительной работы)
- Investigations Directorate (Следственное управление)
- Criminal Police (Криминальная полиция)
- Administration (Штаб)
- Public Security Police (полиция общественной безопасности)
- Forensic Center (Экспертно-криминалистический центр)
- Economic Security (Служба экономической безопасности)
- Traffic Police (ГИБДД)
