= Olkhovsky, Bolshebabinsky Selsoviet, Alexeyevsky District, Volgograd Oblast =

Olkhovsky Ольховский
- Khutor
- Location within Volgograd Oblast Location within Russia
- Coordinates: 50°25′N 42°15′E
- Country: Russia
- Region: Volgograd Oblast
- District: Alexeyevsky District
- Time zone: UTC+4:00

Olkhovsky (Russian: Ольховский) is a rural locality (a khutor) in Bolshebabinskoye Rural Settlement, Alexeyevsky District, Volgograd Oblast, Russia. The population was 59 as of 2010.

== Geography ==
The village is located 6 km north from Bolshoy Babinsky.
