= Ministry of Internal Affairs (Kabardino-Balkaria) =

Министерство внутренних дел по Кабардино-Балкарской Республике Kabardino-Balkaria's Interior Ministry
- Ministry emblem
- Common name: MVD Kabardino-Balkaria
- Abbreviation: МВД по Кабардино-Балкарской Республике
- Motto: служа закону, Служим народу by serving the law, we serve the people

Agency overview
- Formed: 1920
- Employees: 9,000~

Jurisdictional structure
- Operations jurisdiction: RUS
- Governing body: MVD
- General nature: Local civilian police

Operational structure
- Elected officer responsible: Sergey Vasiliev, Interior Minister
- Parent agency: MVD
- Child agency: Politsiya

Website
- Official Site

Ministry for Internal Affairs of Kabardino-Balkaria (Министерство внутренних дел по Кабардино-Балкарской Республике) is the main law enforcement body of the Republic of Kabardino-Balkaria. It is subordinated directly to the Russian Interior Ministry and the President of Kabardino-Balkaria. Current local minister is Sergey Vasiliev (Since November 15, 2010).

The Main Headquarters is in Nalchik City.

== Territorial Structure ==
- Nalchik City Police Department (Управление МВД России по г. Нальчик)
  - Prokhladnsk Region Police Department (Отдел МВД России по Прохладненскому району)
  - Prokhladniy City Police Department (Отдел МВД России по г. Прохладный)
  - Elbrus Region Police Department (Отдел МВД России по Эльбрусскому району)
- Baksanskiy Municipal Police Department (Межмуниципальный отдел МВД России "Баксанский")
  - Zolsk Region Police Department (Отдел МВД России по Зольскому району)
  - May Region Police Department (Отдел МВД России по Майскому району)
  - Tersk Region Police Department (Отдел МВД России по Терскому району)
  - Urvan Region Police Department (Отдел МВД России по Урванскому району)
  - Chegem Region Police Department (Отдел МВД России по Чегемскому району)
  - Lesken Region Police Department (Отдел МВД России по Лескенскому району)
  - Chereksk Region Police Department (Отдел МВД России по Черекскому району)
- Traffic Police (УГИБДД МВД по Кабардино-Балкарской Республике)
