= Ministry of Internal Affairs (Tuva) =

The Ministry of Internal Affairs of Tuva (Russian: Министерство внутренних дел по Республике Тыва) is the main policing and law enforcement body in the Republic of Tuva, a region of Eastern Russia. The current Interior Minister is Police Colonel Yury Polyakov, who assumed office in September 2019. It celebrates its professional holiday on 17 March.

== Structure ==
The MVD of Tuva has the following structure:

- Investigative Department
- Personnel Management
- Criminal Investigation Office
- Office of Economic Security and Anti-Corruption
- Drug Enforcement Administration
- Office of the State Road Safety
- Inspectorate
- Office of Migration
- Forensic Center
- Center for Countering Extremism
- Center for the Temporary Detention of Juvenile Offenders
- Dog Training Center
- Information Center
- Center for Financial Support
- Center for Information Technologies, Communications and Information Protection
- Division for Precinct Police and Juvenile Divisions
- Department of Interaction with Executive Authorities
- Department of Inquiry
- Office and Secrecy Department
- Legal Department
- Department of Information and Public Relations
- Operational-Search Unit
- State Protection Investigative Unit
- Call center
- Separate Company for Guarding Suspects
- Headquarters
- Rear
- Audit Group
- Center for Economic and Service Support
- Health unit
- Council of Veterans

== Main Tasks ==
The main tasks of the Ministry of Internal Affairs are:

1. Improvement of legal regulation established in the field;
2. The provision within its mandate the protection of the rights and freedoms of man and citizen;
3. The organization within its powers the prevention, detection, prevention, detection and investigation of crimes, as well as preventing and combating administrative violations;
4. Ensuring the protection of public order;
5. Road safety;
6. The organization and implementation of state control over arms trafficking;
7. Organization under the laws of the Russian Federation State protection of property and institutions;
8. Management of internal affairs bodies of the republic, the organization of their activities.

Since February 2009, it has been a regional agency of the Ministry of Internal Affairs of the Russian Federation. The MVD of the Republic of Tuva is guided by the Constitution of the Russian Federation, federal constitutional laws, federal laws, Decrees of the President of the Russian Federation and the Government of the Russian Federation.
