= Jharkhand Fire Services =

Fire department in Jharkhand, India

- झारखण्ड अग्निशमन सेवा

Agency overview
- Established: 15 November 2000
- Fire chief: Bibhuti Bhushan Pradhan, IPS, Director General
- EMS level: BLS
- Motto: We Serve to Save

Facilities and equipment
- Divisions: 5
- Stations: 37

Website
- Official website

The Jharkhand Fire Service (JFS) is the state owned agency that attends fire/rescue calls in the state of Jharkhand, India. The department operates several fire stations across the state, providing fire prevention, disaster response and emergency services. It also issues No Objection Certificates (NOCs) for buildings complying with fire safety norms and enforces penalties for violations.

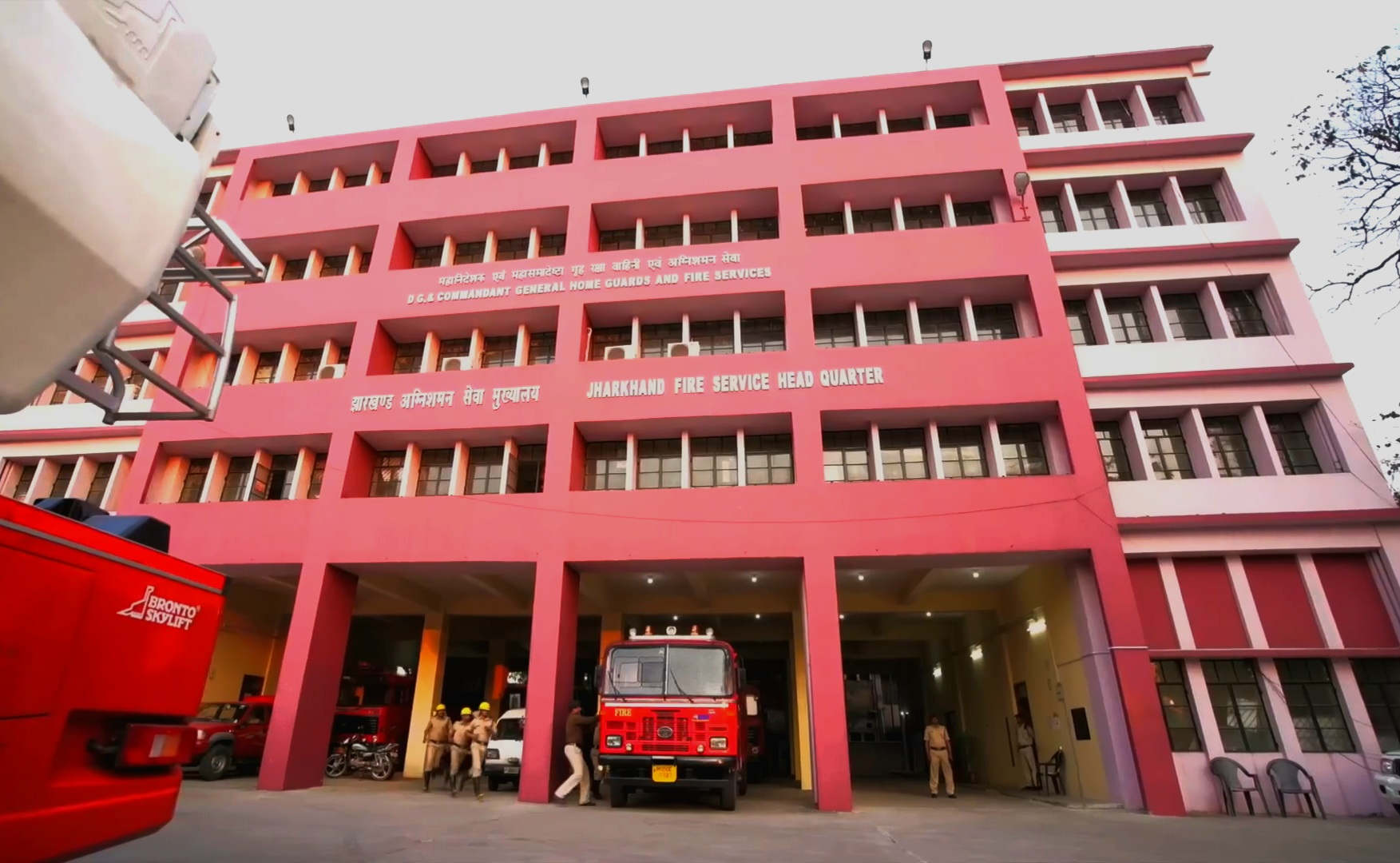
Jharkhand Fire Services Headquarter at Doranda, Ranchi, Jharkhand
