= Ministry of Internal Affairs (Buryatia) =

The Ministry for Internal Affairs of Buryatia (Министерства внутренних дел по Республике Бурятия) is the main law enforcement body in Buryatia, Russian Federation. Current Buryatian Interior Ministry is Aleksander Zaichenko.

== Structure ==
- Minister
  - Deputy Minister - Chief of Police
- Deputy Minister
- Deputy Minister - Chief of Investigations
  - Directorate for Personnel
  - Logistics
- Deputy Minister - Chief of Operations
- Deputy Minister - Chief of Public Security
- Deputy Chief of Police
- Chief of Criminal Investigations
- Chief of Economic Security and combating the corruption
- Chief of Public Security Protection and relations with the Government
- Traffic Police (Управления государственной инспекции безопасности дорожного движения)
- Ulan Ude City Police Department (Управления МВД России по г. Улан-Удэ)
