= Olkhovsky, Dubovsky Selsoviet, Uryupinsky District, Volgograd Oblast =

Olkhovsky Ольховский
- Khutor
- Location within Volgograd Oblast Location within Russia
- Coordinates: 50°35′N 41°59′E
- Country: Russia
- Region: Volgograd Oblast
- District: Uryupinsky District
- Time zone: UTC+4:00

Olkhovsky (Russian: Ольховский) is a rural locality (a khutor) in Dubovskoye Rural Settlement, Uryupinsky District, Volgograd Oblast, Russia. The population was 106 as of 2010.

== Geography ==
The village is located in steppe, 24 km from Uryupinsk and 360 km from Volgograd.
