= Ministry of Internal Affairs (Kalmykia) =

Министерство внутренних дел по Республике Калмыкия Kalmykia's Ministry of Internal Affairs
- Abbreviation: МВД России по Республике Калмыкия
- Motto: служа закону, Служим народу by serving the law, we serve the people

Agency overview
- Employees: 7,000

Jurisdictional structure
- Operations jurisdiction: Russia
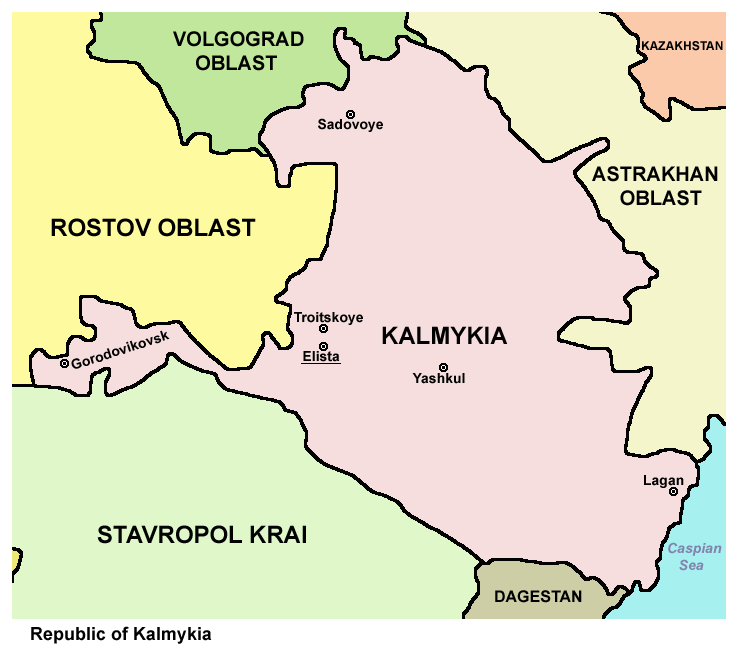
- Map of Министерство внутренних дел по Республике Калмыкия's jurisdiction
- General nature: Local civilian police

Operational structure
- Headquarters: Elista
- Elected officer responsible: Baatr Gindeyev, Internal Minister
- Parent agency: MVD
- Child agency: Politsiya
- Units: List: Criminal Investigative Department; Federal Migatory Service; Traffic Police; OMON Special Force; Air Division

Website
- Official Website

The Ministry for Internal Affairs of Kalmykia (Министерство внутренних дел по Республике Калмыкия) is the main law enforcement body of Kalmykia. It is subordinate directly to the Russian Interior Ministry and the President of Kalmykia.

The current minister is Baatr Alexandrovich Gindeyev (since July 26, 2011). The headquarters is in Elista City.

== Structure ==
- Investigations (Следственный отдел, СО)
- Traffic police (Отдел Государственной инспекции безопасности дорожного движения, ОГИБДД)
- Anti-terrorism center (Центр по противодействию экстремизму, ЦПЭ)
- Operations (Оперативно – разыскная часть собственной безопасности, ОРЧ СБ)
- Detective directorate (Управление уголовного розыска, УУР)
- Anticorruption and economic security directorate (Управление экономической безопасности и противодействия коррупции (УЭБ и ПК)
- Witness protection department (Оперативно-разыскная часть по обеспечению безопасности лиц, подлежащих государственной защите, ОРЧ ОГЗ)
- OMON (Отряд мобильный особого назначения, ОМОН)
- SOBR (Специальный отряд быстрого реагирования, СОБР)
- Information (Информационный центр, ИЦ)
