= Ministry of Internal Affairs (Karachay-Cherkessia) =

Министерство внутренних дел по Карачаево-Черкесской Республике Karachay–Cherkess Republic's Internal Ministry
- Abbreviation: МВД по КЧР
- Motto: служа закону, Служим народу by serving the law, we serve the people

Agency overview
- Employees: 6,000

Jurisdictional structure
- Operations jurisdiction: RUS
- General nature: Local civilian police

Operational structure
- Headquarters: Cherkessk
- Elected officer responsible: Igor Trifonov, Internal Minister
- Parent agency: MVD
- Child agency: Politsiya
- Units: List: Criminal Investigative Department; Federal Migatory Service; Traffic Police; OMON Special Force; Air Division

Website
- Official Website

Ministry for Internal Affairs of Karachay-Cherkessia (Министерство внутренних дел по Карачаево-Черкесской Республике) is the main law enforcement body in Karachay-Cherkessia. It is subordinated to the Russian Interior Ministry.

Current Minister is Jaudat Yusupovich Akhmetkhanov (Since June 30, 2010).

== Structure ==
- Police (Полиция)
  - Detective Dept. (Управление уголовного розыска)
  - Anti-Terrorism (Центр по борьбе с экстремизмом)
  - Anti-Corruption (Управление экономической безопасности и противодействия коррупции)
  - Tax Crimes (Отдел по налоговым преступлениям)
  - Traffic Police (УГИБДД)
- Investigations (Следственное управление)
- Operations (Оперативно-розыскная часть собственной безопасности)
- Inspection (Инспекция)
- Spetsnaz (Центр профессиональной подготовки)
- Information (Информационный центр)
