= Sychevsky, Uryupinsky District, Volgograd Oblast =

Sychevsky Сычёвский
- Khutor
- Location within Volgograd Oblast Location within Russia
- Coordinates: 51°00′N 42°07′E
- Country: Russia
- Region: Volgograd Oblast
- District: Uryupinsky District
- Time zone: UTC+4:00

Sychevsky (Russian: Сычёвский) is a rural locality (a khutor) in Vishnyakovskoye Rural Settlement, Uryupinsky District, Volgograd Oblast, Russia. The population was 63 as of 2010.

== Geography ==
Sychevsky is located in forest steppe, 29 km northeast of Uryupinsk (the district's administrative centre) by road. Verkhnetseplyayevsky is the nearest rural locality.
