= Ministry of Internal Affairs (Mari El) =

Министерство внутренних дел по Республике Марий Эл Mari El Republic's Ministry of Internal Affairs
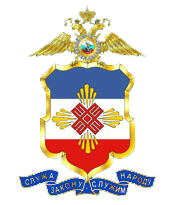
- Abbreviation: МВД по РМЭ
- Motto: служа закону, Служим народу by serving the law, we serve the people

Jurisdictional structure
- Operations jurisdiction: RUS
- Governing body: MVD
- General nature: Local civilian police

Operational structure
- Headquarters: Yoshkar-Ola
- Elected officer responsible: Vyacheslav Bunchev, Internal Minister
- Parent agency: MVD
- Child agency: Politsiya
- Units: List: Criminal Investigative Department; Federal Migatory Service; Traffic Police; OMON Special Force; Air Division

Website
- Official Website

Ministry for Internal Affairs of Mari El (Mari: Марий Эл Республикысе Элкӧргӧ паша министерстве;In Russian: Министерство внутренних дел по Республике Марий Эл) is the main law enforcement organ in Mari El in Russia. Subordinated directly to the Russian Interior Ministry and the President of Mari El.
