= 2026 Punjab recruitment exam scandal =

2026 Punjab recruitment exam scandal refers to the paper leaks happened in Punjab, India, in a recruitment exam of Government of Punjab in July 2026. The exam was held in Baba Farid University of Health Sciences, Faridkot, Punjab, India.

== Background ==
On 19 July 2026, the public government-based examination for recruitment of 454 Pharmacy officers was conducted by Baba Farid University of Health Sciences, Faridkot was held across 25 examination centres, in which as per the official data, 7000 candidates attempted for the examination. But around 11:10 AM (IST) (10 minutes into the test), a candidate inside a Ferozepur exam hall used a hidden pen camera to photograph the question paper and sent images to accomplices via WhatsApp. From where, the images were forwarded to a temporary "control room" set up in Faridkot, where solved answers were dictated. Operatives dictated answers directly back to candidates sitting in exam halls using micro Bluetooth earpieces and hidden battery-operated devices. The gang charged candidates between ₹3.5 lakh and ₹13 lakh for guaranteed passing marks, taking post-dated cheques as security.

== Aftermath and Reactions ==
Following the paper leak and busting operation in around examination centres across the state, in places such as Kotkapura and Ferozepur, Punjab Police immediately registered the formal criminal case. During the ongoing investigation, police arrested 25 candidates along with 10 main accused, 25 candidates and 8 handlers, making the total arrested people to 43. Among the handlers arrested, five are from Punjab and three are from Haryana and Rajasthan.

The petition filed by Keshav Kamboj and others, seeking the cancellation of the written examination to fill pharmacy officers posts under the department of health and family welfare in Punjab on July 19 in Punjab and Haryana High Court, on which High Court stopped the recruitment process until September 17 for further investigation process.

Following the leak, many students who were protesting demanded resignation of Education Minister of Punjab and Aam Aadmi Party leader Harjot Singh Bains.

The major opposition parties in the state such as Indian National Congress, Bharatiya Janata Party and Shiromani Akali Dal protested against the AAP government and demanded resignation from Education Minister and accountability along with action from the Chief Minister Bhagwant Mann.

Meanwhile Chief Minister Mann denied all allegations of paper leak happened under AAP Government in Punjab, terming all as a BJP and Congress conspiracy to overturn the government or take the advantage for upcoming 2027 Punjab election.

== See also ==
- 2022 West Bengal School Service Commission recruitment scam
