= Ministry of Internal Affairs (Ingushetia) =

Министерство внутренних дел по Республике Ингуше́тия Ingushetian Republic's Interior Ministry
- Common name: MVD Ingushetia
- Abbreviation: МВД по Республике Ингушетия
- Motto: служа закону, Служим народу by serving the law, we serve the people

Agency overview
- Formed: 1920
- Employees: 9,000~

Jurisdictional structure
- Operations jurisdiction: Ingushetia, RUS
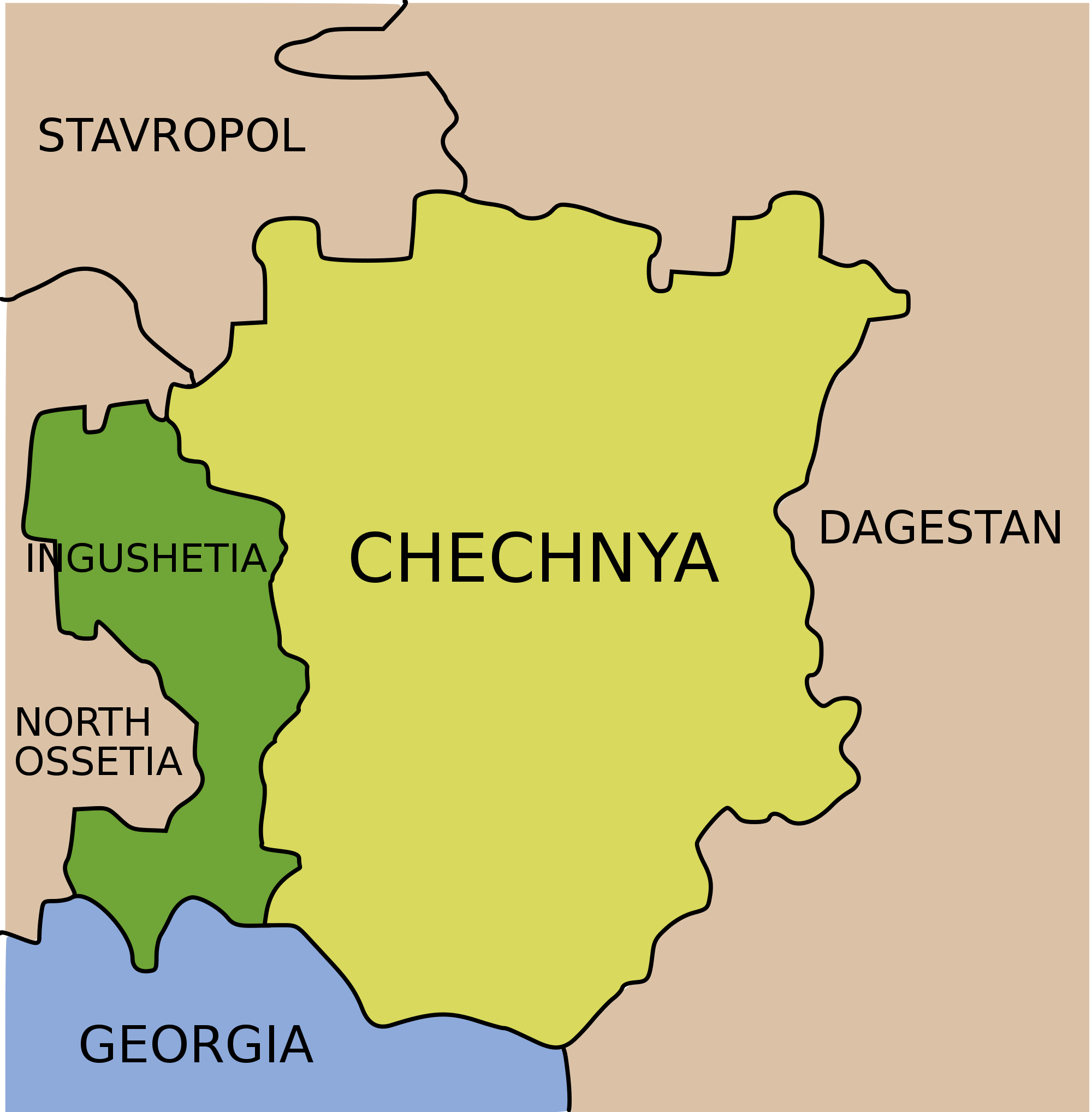
- Map of Министерство внутренних дел по Республике Ингуше́тия's jurisdiction
- Governing body: Government of Ingushetia
- General nature: Local civilian police

Operational structure
- Elected officer responsible: Alexander Trofimov, Interior Minister
- Parent agency: MVD
- Child agency: Politsiya

Website
- Official Site

Ministry for Internal Affairs of Ingushetia (Russian: Министерство внутренних дел по Ингуше́тия Республике) is the local law enforcement agency of Ingushetia.

It is subordinated directly to the Russian Interior Ministry and the President of Ingushetia. Current local minister is Alexander Trofimov (Since June 2011).

The Main Headquarters is in Magas.

== Structure ==
- Investigations (Следственное управление)
- Information (Информационный центр)
- Economic Security and Anti-Corruption Directorate (Управление экономической безопасности и противодействия коррупции)

== See also ==
- Civil war in Ingushetia
