= Ministry of Internal Affairs (Mordovia) =

Министерство внутренних дел по Республике Мордовия Ministry for Internal Affairs of Mordovia
- Abbreviation: МВД по Республике Мордовия
- Motto: служа закону, Служим народу by serving the law, we serve the people

Jurisdictional structure
- Operations jurisdiction: RUS
- Governing body: MVD
- General nature: Local civilian police

Operational structure
- Headquarters: Saransk
- Elected officer responsible: Sregey Kozlov, Internal Minister
- Parent agency: MVD
- Child agency: Politsiya
- Units: List: Criminal Investigative Department; Federal Migatory Service; Traffic Police; OMON Special Force; Air Division

Website
- Official Website

Ministry for Internal Affairs of Mordovia (МВД по Республике Мордовия) or the Police of Mordovia (Полиция Мордовии) is the main law enforcement organization of Mordovia, Russia.

The current Minister is Sergey Kozlov, he attained this position in 2005.

== History ==
The Police in Mordovia were originally formed in 1811 as the Saransk Municipal Police (Саранская городская полиция). There primary functions were Population Security, Trade inspection, epidemic Service, fighting against alcoholic products, Fire Fighting, construction inspection, and crimes investigations.

In 1917 the Czarist police was dissolved and replaced by the Militsiya. In 1918 under the militsiya, the central investigations department (уголовного розыск) was introduced. In 1934 the police were called MKVD of Mordovia, and in 1946 they were renamed to Ministry for Internal Affairs (MVD).

In 1987 various special units were formed, as OMON (отряд милиции особого назначени), with special functions as public order and aid to the municipal authorities in case of Emergencies. In 1989 The Sixth Department for combating Organized Crime was established.

In 2011 the Militsiya was renamed to Politsiya.
