= Ministry of Internal Affairs (Komi Republic) =

Министерство внутренних дел по Республике Коми Komi Republic's Ministry of Internal Affairs
- Abbreviation: Полиция Коми / МВД по Республике Коми
- Motto: служа закону, Служим народу by serving the law, we serve the people

Agency overview
- Formed: 1922
- Preceding agency: Directorate for Internal Affairs

Jurisdictional structure
- Operations jurisdiction: RUS
- Governing body: MVD
- General nature: Local civilian police

Operational structure
- Headquarters: Syktyvkar
- Elected officer responsible: Anatoly Zhukovsky, Internal Minister
- Parent agency: MVD
- Child agency: Politsiya
- Units: List: Criminal Investigative Department; Federal Migatory Service; Traffic Police; OMON Special Force; Air Division

Website
- Official Website

The Ministry for Internal Affairs of Komi Republic (Министерство внутренних дел по Республике Коми) is the main law enforcement organization in the Komi Republic in Russia. It is subordinate to the Russian Interior Ministry and the President of Komi Republic.

== History ==
- November 1917 - The Militsiya of Yaren and Ust-Sysol Was Established.
- 1921 - The Militsiya of Komi Republic was born, as Oblast Commissariat for Internal Affairs
- 1935 - The Traffic Police (Госавтоинспекция) was formed.
- 1948 - The Investigation Department was established.
- 1989 - Department against Organized Crime was established.
- 1991 - The Militsiya of Komi Republic was split into the Militsiya for Public Security (милиция общественной безопасности) and the Criminal Militsiya
- 1991 - The local OMON was formed.
- 1996 - The Service for Internal Security was born as part of the Internal Ministry (служба собственной безопасности МВД РК)

== Ministers ==
- Vladimir Yeryomchenko (2007 - 2011)
- Vladimir Silaev (2005 - 2007)
- Alexander Zadkov (2003 - 2005)
- Vladimir Romanovich (1999 - 2003)
- Evgeny Trofimov (1987 - 1999)
- Vasily Grinin (1982 - 1987)
- Vladimir Yusakov (1973 - 1982)
- Vladimir Dubrovin (1966 - 1973)
- Konstantin Bayutov (1965 - 1965)
- Nikolay Knyazev (1961 - 1965)
- Nikolay Khailov (1953 - 1954)
- Nikolai Noginov (1952 - март 1953)
- Stepan Degtev (1946 - 1952)
- Vasiliy Zezegov (1946)
- Leonid Buyanov (1944 - 1946)
- Savvatiy I. Kabakov (1941 - 1944)
- Vasily Simakov (1941)
- Savvatiy Kabakov (1940 - 1941)
- Mikhail Zhuravlev (1939 - 1940)
- Demyan Kovalev (1937 - 1939)
- Fyodor A. Andreyev (1936 - 1937)
- Phillipp S. Trubitsyn (1936 - 1937), Head of local NKVD
- Ivan Vlasov (1935 - 1936)
- Fyodor Andreyev (1934 - 1935)
- Phillipp Trubitsyn (1933 - 1934)
- Nikolay Pavlov (1932 - 1933)
- Grigoriy Nikolaev (1930 - 1932)
- Alexander Byzov (1927 - 1929)
- Vasiliy I. Chuistov (1926 - 1927)
- Pavel V. Zaboyev (1925 - 1926)
- Yakov Krivoshchekov (1924 - 1925)
- Pavel V. Zaboyev (1924)
- Leonid Lipovsky (1923 - 1924)
- Vasiliy Chuistov (1922 - 1923)
- Alexander Mikhailov (1921 - 1922)
