= Ministry of Internal Affairs (Sakha Republic) =

Law enforcement in the Sakha Republic

Министерство внутренних дел по Республике Саха (Якутия) Ministry for Internal Affairs of Sakha Republic
- Abbreviation: МВД по РС(Я)
- Motto: служа закону, Служим народу by serving the law, we serve the people

Jurisdictional structure
- Operations jurisdiction: RUS
- Governing body: MVD
- General nature: Local civilian police

Operational structure
- Headquarters: Yakutsk
- Elected officer responsible: Victor Koshelev, Internal Minister
- Parent agency: MVD
- Child agency: Politsiya

Website
- Official Website

Ministry for Internal Affairs of Sakha Republic (Russian: Министерство внутренних дел по Республике Саха (Якутия)) is the main law enforcement organ in Sakha Republic, near Siberia in Russia.
