= Ministry of Internal Affairs (Chuvashia) =

Министерство внутренних дел по Чувашской Республике Chuvash Republic's Interior Ministry
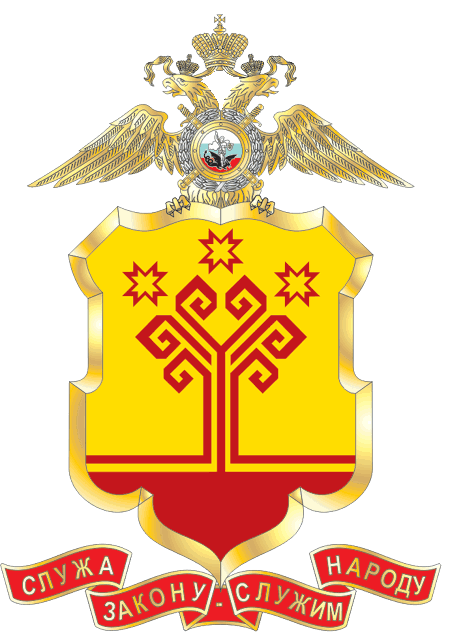
- Common name: MVD Chuvashia
- Abbreviation: МВД России по Чувашской Республике
- Motto: служа закону, Служим народу by serving the law, we serve the people

Agency overview
- Formed: 1920
- Employees: 9,000~

Jurisdictional structure
- Operations jurisdiction: Chuvashia, RUS
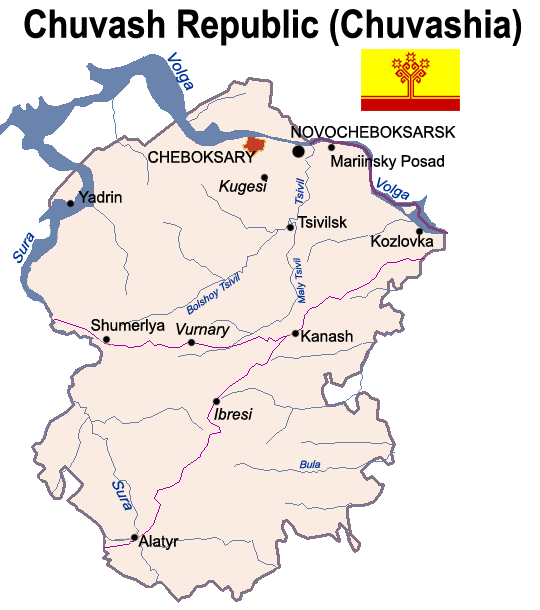
- Map of Министерство внутренних дел по Чувашской Республике's jurisdiction
- Area: 18,300 km2 (7,065.7 sq mi) [2002 census]
- Population: 1,251,619 (2010 census)
- Governing body: Government of Chuvashia
- General nature: Local civilian police

Operational structure
- Headquarters: Cheboksary
- Elected officer responsible: Sergei Semyonov, Interior Minister
- Parent agency: MVD
- Child agency: Politsiya

Website
- Official Site

Ministry for Internal Affairs of Chuvashia (Министерство внутренних дел по Чувашской Республике) is the main law enforcement body of Chuvashia. It is a subordinate department to the Russian Interior Ministry and the president of Chuvashia. The local minister since 2011 is Sergei Semyonov. Its headquarters are located in Cheboksary.

== Structure ==
- Directorate for Criminal Affairs (Управление уголовного розыска)
- Directorate for Economic Security and Combating Against Corruption (Управление экономической безопасности и противодействия коррупции)
- Center for Fighting Against Extremism and Terrorism (Центр по противодействию экстремизму)
- Operations (Оперативно-разыскная часть; собственной безопасности)
- Traffic Police (Управление государственной инспекции безопасности дорожного движения)
- Spetsnaz (Отряд специального назначения)
- OMON (Отряд мобильный особого назначения)
- Expert-Criminal Center (Экспертно-криминалистический центр)
- Investigations (Следственное управление)
- Center for Information Technology, Communications and Information Security (Центр информационных технологий, связи и защиты информации)
- Department for Computer Crimes (Отдел К; отдел по борьбе с правонарушениями в сфере информационных технологий)
- Cheboksary City Police (Управление Министерства внутренних дел Российской Федерации по городу Чебоксары
  - Alatyr Municipal Police (Межмуниципальный отдел МВД РФ «Алатырский»)
  - Batyrev Municipal Police (Межмуниципальный отдел МВД РФ «Батыревский»)
  - Vurnar Municipal Police (Межмуниципальный отдел МВД РФ «Вурнарский»)
  - Komsomol Municipal Police (Межмуниципальный отдел МВД РФ «Комсомольский»)
  - Marinsko-Posadsky Municipal Police (Межмуниципальный отдел МВД РФ «Мариинско-Посадский»)
  - Urmar Municipal Police (Межмуниципальный отдел МВД РФ «Урмарский»)
  - Tsivil Municipal Police(Межмуниципальный отдел МВД РФ «Цивильский»)
  - Shumerlin Municipal Police (Межмуниципальный отдел МВД РФ «Шумерлинский»)
- Ibersinsky Region Police Department (Отдел МВД РФ по Ибресинскому району)
- Kanash City Police Department (Отдел МВД РФ по г.Канаш)
- Kanash Region Police Department (Отдел МВД РФ по Канашскому району)
- Morgaushsk Region Police Department (Отдел МВД РФ по Моргаушскому району)
- Novo-Cheboksary City Police Department (Отдел МВД РФ по г.Новочебоксарск)
- Cheboksary Region Police Department (Отдел МВД РФ по Чебоксарскому району)
- Yadrin Region Police Department (Отдел МВД РФ по Ядринскому району)
- Dynamo Chuvash Sports Company (Чувашская республиканская организация физкультурно-спортивного общества "Динамо")

== Heads of Chuvashian Police ==
=== Heads of Chuvashian Oblast Militsiya ===
- Timofey Volkov (1920-1921)
- Ivan Morozov (1921-1926)

=== People's Commissar for Internal Affairs of the Chuvash Soviet Socialist Autonomous Republic ===
- Alexander Lbov (1926-1927)
- Anisim Andreyev (1927-1929)
- Georgy Marcelsky (1929-1933)
- Pavel Suvorovsky (1933-1937)
- Alexey Rozanov (1937-1938)
- Pavel Konyakin (1938-1939)
- Nikolay Katkov (1939-1940)
- Stepan Belolipetskiy (1940-1948)
- Nikolai Zakharov (1948-1951)

=== Minister for Internal Affairs of the Chuvash Soviet Socialist Autonomous Republic ===
- Nikolay Vakarev (1951-1954)
- Georgiy Buchnev (1954-1957)

=== Ministers for Security of Public Order ===
- Vsevolod Arkhipov (1957-1965)
- Nikolay Kozin (1965-1972)

=== Minister for Internal Affairs ===
- Viktor Yefimov (1972-1979)
- Vasiliy Ignatov (1979-1984)
- Evgeny Salmin (1984-1987)
- Yuri Nazarov (1987-1990)
- Mikhail Kiselyov (1990-1995)

=== Minister for Internal Affairs of the Chuvash Republic ===
- Pyotr Dolgachev (1995-1997)
- Vadim Antonov (1997-2011)
- Sergey Semeyonov (since 2011)
