= Ministry of Internal Affairs (Udmurtia) =

Министерство внутренних дел по Удмуртской Республике Ministry for Internal Affairs of Udmurt Republic
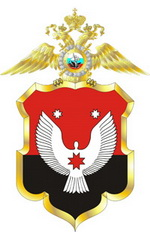
- Common name: Полиция Удмуртии
- Abbreviation: МВД по УР
- Motto: служа закону, Служим народу by serving the law, we serve the people

Jurisdictional structure
- Operations jurisdiction: RUS
- Governing body: MVD
- General nature: Local civilian police

Operational structure
- Headquarters: 17 Soviet Street, Izhevsk
- Elected officer responsible: Alexander Peruvkhin, Internal Minister
- Parent agency: MVD
- Child agency: Politsiya

Website
- Official Website

Ministry for Internal Affairs of Udmurtia (Министерство внутренних дел по Удмуртской Республике) or the Police of Udmurtia (Полиция Удмуртии) is the main law enforcement agency in Government of Udmurt Republic in Russia. It subordinate to the Federal MVD and the President of Udmurtia.

Current minister and chief of police in udmurt republic is Aleksander Pervukhin (since 2011).

== Structure ==
=== "Sobol" Special Unit ===
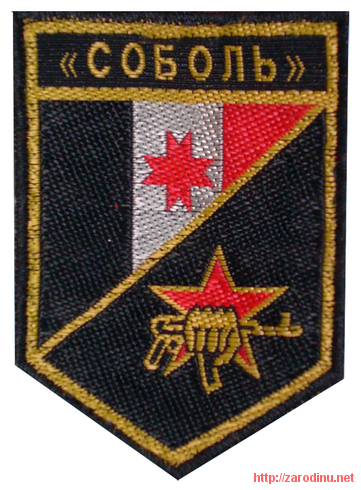
"Sobol" Unit

The "Sobol" Special police unit (подразделения «Соболь» МВД по Удмуртской Республике) born in 1993 as high response unit for combating hostages crisis and conducting anti-terrorist operations. The unit is subordinated to the Directorate for Organized Crime (Управление организованной преступностью, УОП) alongside the local SOBR.

In 2002 SOBR was renamed as OMSN "Sobol" of the Criminal Militsiya. In 2005 Marat Samigulovich was appointed as Chief of "Sobol" Unit.

Between 1994 and 1996 the unit participated in anti-terrorist operations in Chechnya.
