= Jharkhand Jaguar =

Specialised police force of Jharkhand, India

Jharkhand Jaguar (JJ), is a specialised combat insurgency unit of the Jharkhand Police established to conduct operations against Naxalism and left-wing extremism in the Indian state of Jharkhand. Its formation was approved by the state government in 2007 and the formal notification establishing the force was issued in February 2008. It was organised on the lines of the Greyhounds of Andhra Pradesh.

== History ==
The Government of Jharkhand established the Special Task Force (STF) in February 2008 to combat Naxalism in the state. Home Department Notification No. 8C-203/07-748/Ranchi, dated 19 February 2008, sanctioned 20 assault groups for the force, which was subsequently named Jharkhand Jaguar (JJ). A further 20 assault groups were sanctioned through Notification No. 8/C-202/09-1194/Ranchi, dated 22 October 2009, bringing the sanctioned strength to 40 groups, of which 22 were initially raised.

The force initially operated from a temporary facility at Dhurwa, Ranchi. In June 2016, its permanent headquarters and training complex was established at Tendergram in the Kanke area of Ranchi district. The facility includes administrative buildings, accommodation and training infrastructure.

== Organisation and role ==
Jharkhand Jaguar functions as a specialised counter insurgency unit of the state police. Its personnel are selected from different branches of the Jharkhand Police, including the Jharkhand Armed Police, Indian Reserve Battalion and district police. Selected personnel receive specialised training at institutions across the country.

The unit conducts operations against Maoist groups in different parts of Jharkhand. Its deployment has included areas such as Saranda, Budha Pahar and the Parasnath Hills.

== See also ==
- Jharkhand Police
- Greyhounds (police)
- CoBRA (unit)
- Central Reserve Police Force
