= Yuri Olkhovsky =

Russian-American professor and anti-Soviet activist

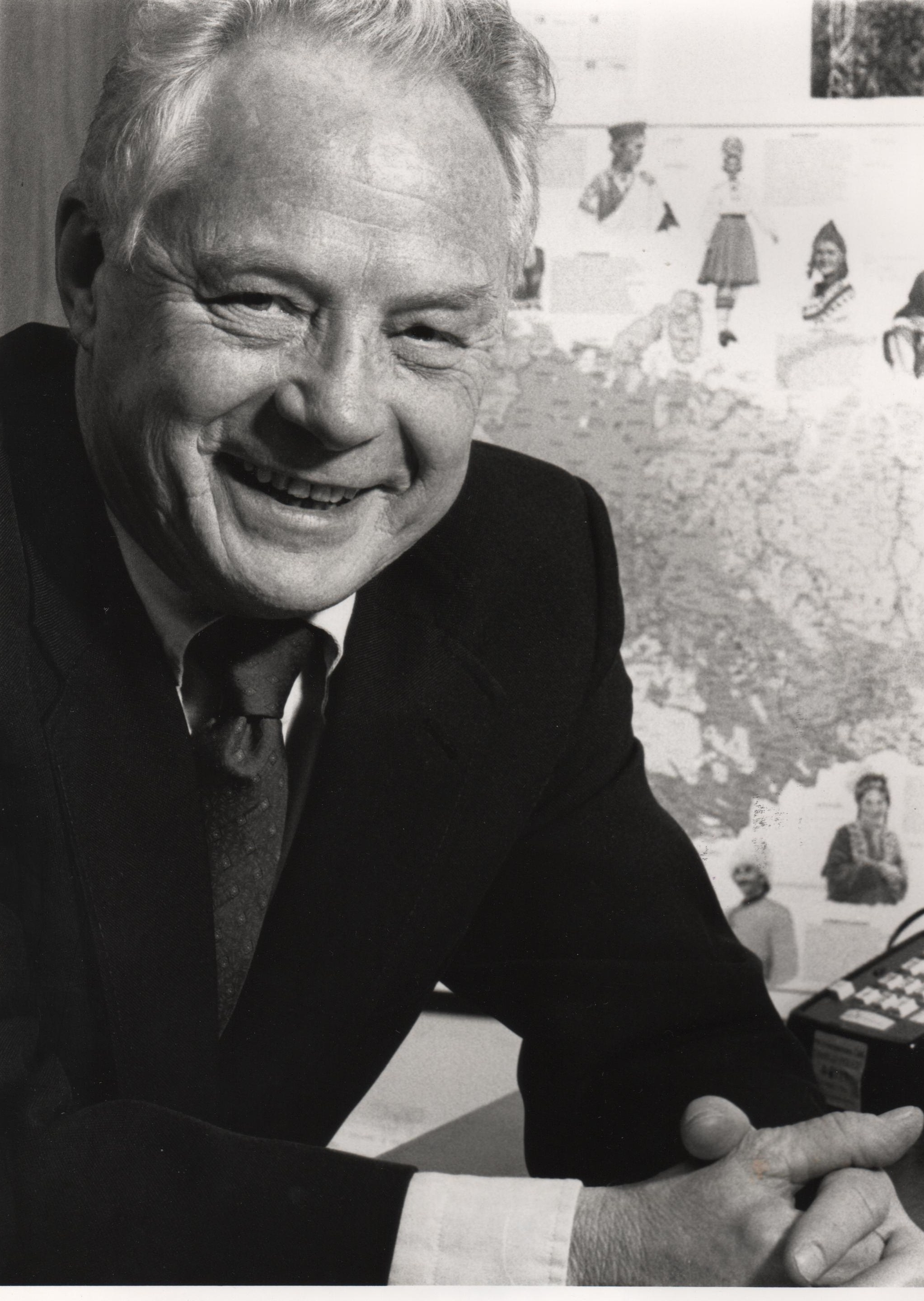
- Yuri Olkhovsky circa 1990s
- Born: June 22, 1930; Soviet Ukraine
- Died: June 7, 2009 (aged 78)

Yuri Andreyevich Olkhovsky (June 22, 1930 – June 7, 2009) was a prominent US supporter of the Soviet dissident movement in the 1970s and 1980s, a retired professor of George Washington University and a broadcaster for the Voice of America.

== Early life ==
Olkhovsky was born June 22, 1930, in Ukraine. A survivor of Stalin’s Soviet Union and Hitler’s Germany, he immigrated with his parents to the United States in 1949, becoming an American citizen in 1953. The family settled in Utica, New York. Olkhovsky's father went to work making T-shirts in a clothing factory and his mother found work in a laundry. Olkhovsky, known as George by his friends and colleagues, became a farmworker picking strawberries.

He served in the US Army’s 101st Airborne Division during the Korean War at Camp Breckinridge and Ft. Knox, Kentucky, becoming the division’s senior linguist. By 1959, Olkhovsky earned a BA and an MA in history from the University of Minnesota. In 1968 he completed his PhD in Russian history at Georgetown University.

== Career ==
Olkhovsky came to the Washington, D.C., area in 1957 and worked as a Russian language instructor at the National Security Agency. From the mid-1960s until after the breakup of the Soviet Union, he continued to develop and teach Russian language and culture courses part-time to NSA staff.

In 1962, Olkhovsky became a full-time faculty member at GWU where he worked until retiring in 1998. His positions included several terms as Chairman of GWU’s Department of Slavic Languages and Literature.

During the 1970s and 80s, Olkhovsky worked avidly in support of prominent Soviet dissidents working with various administrations and members of Congress on both sides of the aisle. He worked with well-known Soviet dissidents who came to the West including Vladimir Bukovsky, Andrei Amalrik, General Petro Grigorenko and Vladimir Maximov. Olkhovsky's efforts included assisting in the editing, publication and distribution of the dissident journal Kontinent published in the West. In the late 1970s he served as Kontinent's US correspondent and representative. He worked on human rights causes that included maintaining a friendship and collaboration with famed cellist and conductor Mstislav Rostropovich for over two decades.

From 1964 until 1983, Olkhovsky also worked part time as a broadcaster and writer for the Voice of America Russian Service. In 1983, he took a two-year leave from GWU to be Deputy Director of Radio Liberty in Munich, a US government-funded radio station established during the Cold War to broadcast to audiences in the Soviet Union. According to his Washington Post obituary, "When Nobel Prize-winning Russian writer Alexander I. Solzhenitsyn was exiled to the West in 1974, he told reporters that he had been amazed at the amount of straight news on Voice of America. The broadcaster he often heard was Dr. Olkhovsky."

=== Writing ===
Olkhovsky's book "Vladimir Stasov and Russian National Culture" (1983) examines a Russian author and cultural critic who wrote extensively on the development of Russian music in the 19th century.

In 1941, the invading German army destroyed an about-to-be-published book that Olkhovsky's father, Andrey Vasilyevich Olkhovsky, had written. In 2003, Olkhovsky fulfilled a promise to his father by editing and updating the manuscript and publishing the book, a comprehensive survey of Ukrainian music. Andrey Vasilyevich Olkhovsky was known in academic musicology circles for his 1955 book Music Under the Soviets: The Agony of an Art. This was one of the first studies of Soviet music written in the West.
