= Olkhovsky, Kumylzhensky District, Volgograd Oblast =

Olkhovsky Ольховский
- Khutor
- Location within Volgograd Oblast Location within Russia
- Coordinates: 49°58′N 42°05′E
- Country: Russia
- Region: Volgograd Oblast
- District: Kumylzhensky District
- Time zone: UTC+4:00

Olkhovsky (Russian: Ольховский) is a rural locality (a khutor) in Popovskoye Rural Settlement, Kumylzhensky District, Volgograd Oblast, Russia. The population was 171 as of 2010.

== Geography ==
Olkhovsky is located in forest steppe, on Khopyorsko-Buzulukskaya Plain, on the bank of the Yedovlya River, 55 km northwest of Kumylzhenskaya (the district's administrative centre) by road. Popov is the nearest rural locality.
