= Ministry of Internal Affairs (North Ossetia–Alania) =

Министерство внутренних дел по Республике Северная Осетия – Алания Ministry for Internal Affairs of North Ossetia–Alania
- Abbreviation: МВД по Республике РСО-Алания
- Motto: служа закону, Служим народу by serving the law, we serve the people

Jurisdictional structure
- Operations jurisdiction: RUS
- Governing body: MVD
- General nature: Local civilian police

Operational structure
- Headquarters: Vladikavkaz
- Parent agency: MVD
- Child agency: Politsiya
- Units: List: Criminal Investigative Department; Federal Migatory Service; Traffic Police; OMON Special Force; Air Division

Website
- Official Website

The Ministry for Internal Affairs (Министерство внутренних дел по Республике Северная Осетия – Алания) is the main law enforcement organ in North Ossetia–Alania in south Russia.

Current minister is Artur Akhmetkhanov (since December 2008). One of the known ministers in North Ossetia–Alania, was Kazbek Dzantiev (1996-2004).
