= Sadar Hospital, Ranchi =

Geography
- Location: Ranchi, Jharkhand, India
- Coordinates: 23.3688935°N 85.3258143°E

Organisation
- Type: Teaching
- Affiliated university: Ranchi University

Services
- Beds: 500

History
- Opened: 15 August 2011

Links
- Lists: Hospitals in India

Ranchi University
- Type: Public
- Established: 2011
- President: Minister for Health and Family Welfare
- Location: Ranchi, Jharkhand, India
- Campus: Urban
- Language: English

Sadar Hospital, Ranchi (Hindi: सदर हस्पताल, रांची) is a medical institute in Ranchi, the capital of Jharkhand State, India. The hospital was established on 15 August 2011 under an act of the Jharkhand Assembly.

The institute provides free medical service along with medicines.

== History ==
Post separation from Bihar, the capital city of Jharkhand need the institution to cater the needs of medical and health care to the public, for this reason the Sadar Hospital was established at the heart of Ranchi city The unit will be in hands of 14 doctors and 41 nurses for sometime until required numbers of doctors and para-medical healthcare professionals were appointed in the year 2017. The hospital is spread over 210 acres of lush green campus. They have a total bed capacity of 643.

During the COVID-19 pandemic in India, Sadar Hospital provided testing, treatment, and vaccines for the people of Ranchi. In August 2021, a new 27-bed pediatric intensive care unit (PICU) was opened to treat children with severe COVID-19 symptoms but it is also intended for long-term use after the pandemic.

In January 2021, the hospital performed its first successful hip replacement surgery.

== Facilities ==
The hospital has medical equipment all at a cost more than Rs. 143.47 crores.

- Operation theatre,
- Blood storage unit,
- Pre/post operative rooms,
- Medicine OPD,
- Physiotherapy unit,
- Child care (OPD, IPD and ICU),
- General medicine room,
- Dog bite room,
- Pharmacy,
- X-Ray machine,
- Colour ultrasound machine,
- Computerized ECG machine and
- Foetal Doppler machines with computerized registration.

== Sadar Medical College and Hospital, Ranchi ==
Sadar Medical College and Hospital, Ranchi is in its stage of inception it would be a co-educational Medical College located in Ranchi, Jharkhand, India. It would be the second medical college in Ranchi, the other being Rajendra Institute of Medical Sciences. Sadar Hospital, Ranchi civil surgeon Dr Shiv Shankar Harijan assisted in preparation of detailed project report for setting up an intensive care unit. The maternity unit in the hospital has been functioning without an ICU from its inception.

== Academics ==
The intake proposed every year is to be 150 students for the undergraduate course. As per the new regulations of the Medical Council of India (MCI). The college will provide postgraduate education in almost every department. The neurosurgery department would offer a M.Ch. (Master chirurgiae or Master of Surgery) degree. About 15% of the total seat will be filled through AIPMT, a part of it through the central government and rest through the state entrance exam. The faculty of Anatomy, surgery and internal medicine department have received training at AIIMS New Delhi. HOD of surgery has trained in Australia and among the top surgeons in India.

== Accreditation ==
The Medical College is affiliated to Ranchi University, Ranchi, Jharkhand. Approved by MCI for intake of 100 MBBS students every year.

== Hospital ==
It is associated with 500 bed super-specialty Sadar Hospital, Ranchi which serves as the teaching hospital.

=== Departments ===
Department	In-patient/Out-patient
General Medicine & Surgery	Out-patient
Obstetric & Gynaecology	Both
Skin & VD	Out-patient
Ophthalmology	Both
Ear, Nose & Throat	Out-patient
Orthopaedic	Both
Pediatric	Both
Physitristy	Out-patient
Surgical & Medical	In-patient
Day care-Thalassemia	In-patient
Physiotherapy	Out-patient
Emergency	In-patient
SNCU	In-patient
ICU	In-patient
Geriatric	In-patient
COVID	In-patient
