= Department of Home, Jail & Disaster Management (Jharkhand) =

State government department of Jharkhand

- गृह, कारा एवं आपदा प्रबंधन विभाग

Department overview
- Formed: 15 November 2000
- Jurisdiction: State of Jharkhand
- Headquarters: Project Building, Dhurwa, Ranchi, Jharkhand; 23.29417°N 85.29299°E
- Minister responsible: Hemant Soren, Chief Minister of Jharkhand and Minister of Home, Jail & Disaster Management
- Department executives: Vandana Dadel, IAS, Additional Chief Secretary (Home, Jail); Smt. Vipra Bhal, IAS, Secretary (Disaster Management)
- Parent department: Government of Jharkhand
- Website: Official website

The Department of Home, Jail & Disaster Management (Hindi: गृह कारा एवं आपदा प्रबंधन विभाग) is a key administrative department of the Government of Jharkhand. It is responsible for the maintenance of law and order, prevention and investigation of crime, prosecution of offenders, management of prisons, fire services, home guards and disaster preparedness and response across the state. The department functions as the nodal authority for the State Secretariat Service and oversees the operations of the Jharkhand Police, Home Guards, and Fire Services.

It also acts as the cadre controlling authority for officers of the Indian Police Service (Jharkhand Cadre) and the Jharkhand Police Service (JPS).

The Chief Minister of Jharkhand usually holds the departmental portfolio, while the administrative responsibilities are carried out by the Additional Chief Secretary (Home), an IAS officer, who coordinates among the department’s various agencies and ensures effective implementation of policies and programs.

== Ministerial team ==
The Department of Home, Jail & Disaster Management in Jharkhand is headed by the Cabinet Minister for Home. Since December 2024, Hemant Soren, the Chief Minister of Jharkhand, holds the portfolio of the Home Ministry.

The administrative head of the department is the Additional Chief Secretary (Home), who is supported by Special Secretaries and other senior officials. Since March 2023, Vandana Dadel, a 1996-batch IAS officer, was appointed as the new Home Secretary of Jharkhand.

== See also ==
- Government of Jharkhand
- Jharkhand Police
- Ministry of Home Affairs (India)
- National Disaster Response Force
