= Jharkhand Staff Selection Commission =

State government recruitment commission in Jharkhand, India

- झारखंड कर्मचारी चयन आयोग

Agency overview
- Formed: 2008
- Jurisdiction: Jharkhand
- Headquarters: Ranchi, Jharkhand, India
- Parent department: Department of Personnel, Administrative Reforms and Rajbhasha
- Website: jssc.jharkhand.gov.in

The Jharkhand Staff Selection Commission (JSSC) is a state government recruitment body responsible for conducting examinations and selecting candidates for various posts under the Government of Jharkhand. It recruits for Group B (non-gazetted), Group C and Group D posts and services for which direct recruitment is provided and which are outside the purview of the Jharkhand Public Service Commission..

== Functions ==
JSSC conducts examinations and recruitment for various posts under the Government of Jharkhand.

== History ==
The Jharkhand Staff Selection Commission was established under the Jharkhand Staff Selection Commission Act, 2008.

== Organisation ==
The commission is headquartered in Ranchi, Jharkhand.
