= Jharkhand Police =

Jharkhand Police झारखंड पुलिस
- Insignia of Jharkhand Police

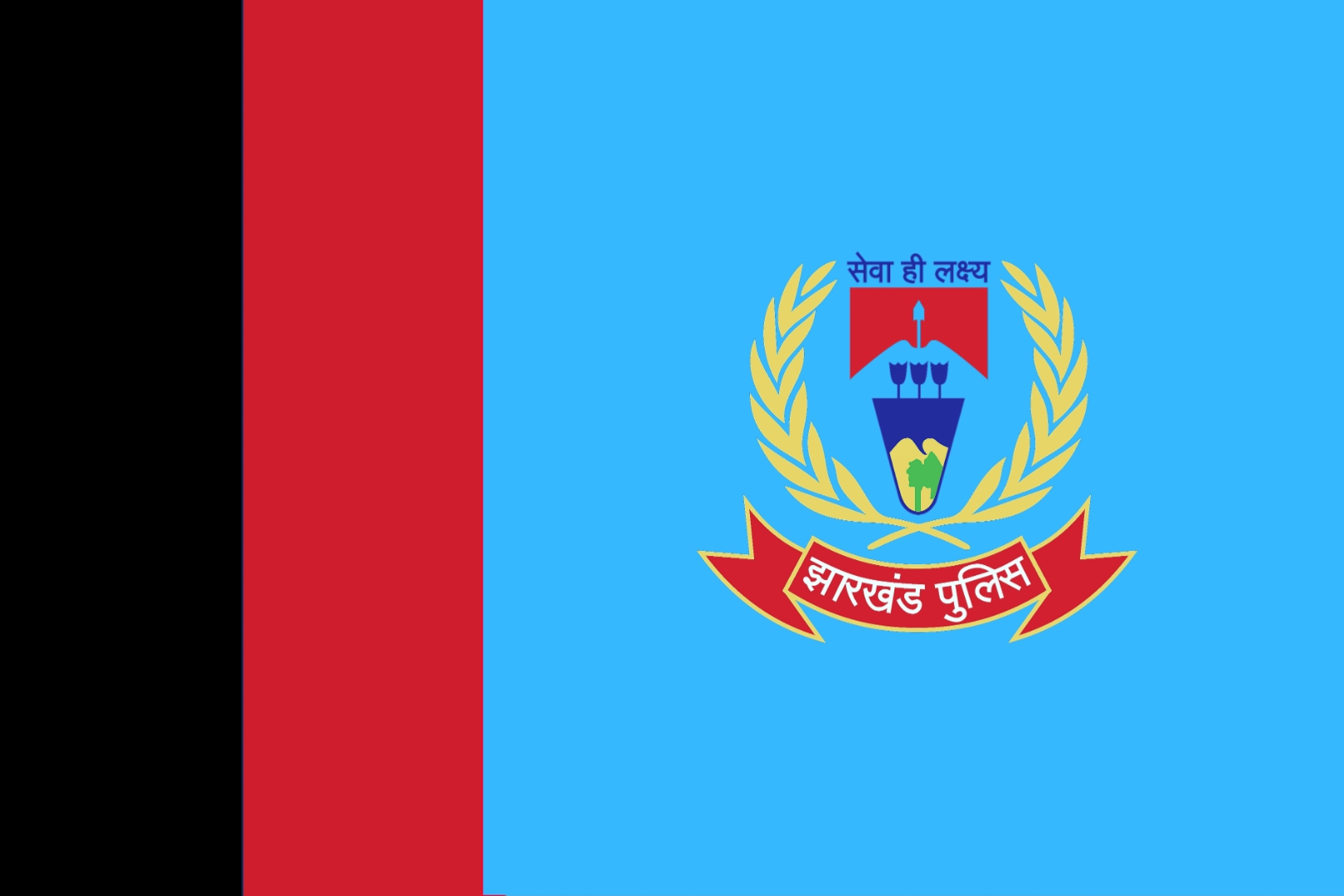
- Flag of Jharkhand Police
- Common name: Police
- Abbreviation: JPS (झ.पो.)
- Motto: Public Service is our Goal सेवा ही लक्ष्य

Agency overview
- Formed: 2000; 26 years ago
- Employees: Unknown

Jurisdictional structure
- Operations jurisdiction: Jharkhand, IN
- Jurisdiction of the Jharkhand Police
- Area: 79,714 km^{2} (30,778 sq mi)
- Population: 32,988,134 (2011)
- Legal jurisdiction: Jharkhand
- Governing body: Government of Jharkhand
- General nature: Local civilian police

Operational structure
- Headquarters: Jharkhand Police Headquarters, Dhurwa, Ranchi, Jharkhand (834004)
- Gazetted Officers: 149 IPS officers
- Minister responsible: Hemant Soren, Chief Minister and Minister of Home, Jail & Disaster Management
- Agency executive: Tadasha Mishra IPS, DGP
- Child agencies: • CID Jharkhand; • Jharkhand Jaguar (JJ); • Jharkhand STF; • Jharkhand Armed Police (JAP); • Jharkhand ATS

Website
- https://jhpolice.gov.in/

Jharkhand Police (Hindi: झारखंड पुलिस) is the law enforcement agency responsible for maintaining law and order in the Indian state of Jharkhand. Established in 2000 following the creation of the state, It is headed by Director General of Police, Tadasha Mishra (IPS), and headquartered in Ranchi, Jharkhand. The police department operates under the control of the Department of Home, Government of Jharkhand.

Following the creation of the state from Bihar Reorganisation Act in 2000, Jharkhand Police has developed a structured four-tier recruitment system. The top-tier positions are occupied by Indian Police Service (IPS) officers, selected through the Union Public Service Commission. The next level features Deputy Superintendent of Police (D.S.P.) rank officers, recruited by the Jharkhand Public Service Commission. Non-gazetted officers join at the sub-inspector level via the Jharkhand Subordinate Service Commission. Additional posts are filled through competitive recruitment rallies or direct examination processes. The force is sanctioned a strength of approximately 149 IPS officers, though only 100 were allotted as of 2015 by the Ministry of Home Affairs (MHA). Jharkhand stands out as one of the leading Indian states for total police recruitment.

== Organisational structure ==
Its organisational structure is divided into Field Posting and Non-Field Postings. The Field Postings are divided into 24 district police units in the state. The Head of the Jharkhand Police is the Director General of Police and under him are the Different Departments of:-

- Special Branch
- Crime Investigation Department(CID)
- Headquarters
- Modernisation
- Jharkhand Armed Police(JAP)
- Law and Order
- These Departments are headed by IPS Officers of the Additional Director General of Police Rank. They are assisted by Officers of the ranks of Inspector Generals of Police, Deputy Inspector General of Police, Superintendent of Police and other subordinate Ranks.

=== Hierarchy ===
Officers

- Director General of Police (DGP)
- Additional Director General of Police (ADG)
- Inspector General of Police (IG)
- Deputy Inspector General of Police (DIG)
- Senior Superintendent of Police (SSP)
- Superintendent of Police (SP)
- Additional Superintendent of Police
- Assistant SP (IPS) or Deputy SP (Jharkhand Police Service)

Sub-ordinates

- Inspector of Police
- Sub-Inspector of Police
- Assistant Sub-Inspector of Police
- Head Constable
- Senior Constable
- Constable

== Notable IPS officers (started out before the creation of Jharkhand Police) ==
- Gopal Achari an IPS officer of the 1966 Batch.
- Vishnu Dayal Ram an IPS Officer of the 1973 Batch.
- Rajiv Jain an IPS Officer of the 1980 Batch.
- Asha Sinha an IPS Officer of the 1982 Batch.
- Ajoy Kumar an IPS Officer of the 1986 Batch.
- Rameshwar Oraon an IPS Officer of the 1972 Batch.

== See also ==
- Government of Jharkhand
- Department of Home, Jail & Disaster Management (Jharkhand)
- CID Jharkhand
- Jharkhand Jaguar
- Law enforcement in India
- State Armed Police Forces
