= Ministry of Internal Affairs (Khakassia) =

Khakassia law enforcement agency

Министерство внутренних дел по Республике Хакасия Khakassia Republic's Ministry of Internal Affairs
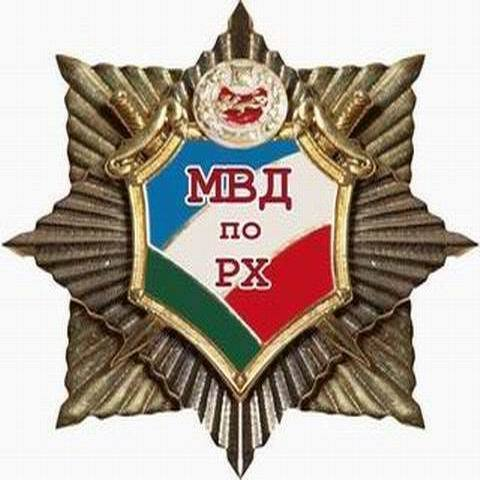
- Abbreviation: МВД Хакасии
- Motto: служа закону, Служим народу by serving the law, we serve the people

Agency overview
- Formed: 1992
- Preceding agency: Directorate for Internal Affairs

Jurisdictional structure
- Operations jurisdiction: RUS
- Governing body: MVD
- General nature: Local civilian police

Operational structure
- Headquarters: Abakan
- Elected officer responsible: Ilya Olkhovsky, Internal Minister
- Parent agency: MVD
- Child agency: Politsiya
- Units: List: Criminal Investigative Department; Federal Migatory Service; Traffic Police; OMON Special Force; Air Division

Website
- Official Website

Ministry for Internal Affairs of Khakassia (Министерство внутренних дел по Республике Хакасия) is the main law enforcement organ in the Republic of Khakassia in Russia. Subordinated directly to the Russian Interior Ministry and the President of Khakassia.

== History ==
After the formation of Autonomous Soviet Socialist Republic of Khakassia (Khakassia ASSR), the Khakassia's Internal Ministry was established, in 1991 (In 1992 the Khakassia ASSR become the Republic of Khakassia).

On July 13, 1993 the Abakan City Police Department was created, and on May 18 in the same year, the local OMON was born.

== Structure ==
=== Apparatus ===
- Information (Информационный центр)
- Criminal Investigation Department (Управление уголовного розыска)
- Public Order and contact with Government of Khakassia (Управление организации охраны общественного порядка и взаимодействия с органами государственной власти Республики Хакасия)
- Investigations (Следственное управление)
- Licensing (Центр лицензионно-разрешительной работы)
- Expert-Criminal Center (Экспертно-криминалистический центр)
- Police Stations (Отдел организации деятельности участковых уполномоченных полиции и подразделений по делам несовершеннолетних)
- Property Security (Отдел вневедомственной охраны)
- Staff (Отдел по работе с личным составом)
- Public Order (Отдел организации общественного порядка на улицах и при проведении массовых мероприятий)
- Operations (Оперативно-разыскная часть собственной безопасности)
- Medical and Santization (Медико-санитарная часть)

=== Territorial Organs ===
- Abakan City Police Department (УМВД России по г.Абакану)
- Chernogor City Police (ОМВД России по г.Черногорску)
- Askiz Region Police (ОМВД России по Аскизскому району)
- Altai Region Police (ОМВД России по Алтайскому району)
- Sayanogor Police (МО МВД России «Саяногорский»)
- Sayanogor Beisk Region Police (Отдел полиции по Бейскому району МО МВД России «Саяногорский»)
- Shirinsky Beisk Region Police (Отдел полиции по Боградскому району МО МВД России «Ширинский»)
- Tashtypsky City Police (МО МВД России «Таштыпский»)
- Abaza City Police (Отдел полиции по г.Абаза МО МВД России «Таштыпский»)
- Ust-Abakan Police Department (МО МВД России «Усть-Абаканский»)
- Sorsk City Police Department (Отделение полиции по г.Сорску МО МВД России «Усть-Абаканский»)
- Shirinsky Police (МО МВД России "Ширинский")
- Ordzhonikidze Region Police (Отделение полиции по Орджоникидзевскому району МО МВД России «Ширинский»)

== Ministers ==
Khakassia's Interior ministers
| Minister | Start year | End year |
|---|---|---|
| Anatoly Vasiliev | 1992 | 1997 |
| Vyacheslav Trubnikov | 1997 | 1999 |
| Vitaly Zhuravell | 1999 | 2006 |
| Vladimir Ponomarev | 2006 | 2008 |
| Ilya Olkhovsky | 2008 | |
