= Ministry of Internal Affairs (Tatarstan) =

Министерство внутренних дел по Республике Татарстан Татарстан Республикасы буенча Эчке эшләр министрлыгы Tatarstan's Interior Ministry
- Motto: служа закону, Служим народу By serving the law, we serve the people

Jurisdictional structure
- Operations jurisdiction: Russia
- Governing body: MVD
- General nature: Local civilian police

Operational structure
- Headquarters: Kazan
- Elected officer responsible: Artyom Khokhorin, Interior Minister

Website
- http://www.16.mvd.ru/

Ministry of Interior in the Republic of Tatarstan (Tatar: Татарстан Республикасы буенча Эчке эшләр министрлыгы, romanized: Tatarstan Respublikası buyınça Eçke eşlär ministrlığı; Russian: МВД по Республике Татарстан, romanized: MBD po Respublike Tatarstan) is the main law enforcement agency of Tatarstan, a republic in central Russia. Since March 2012, the current minister is Artyom Khokhorin.

The Ministry of Interior of the Republic of Tatarstan works in accordance with the clause about Ministry of Interior of the Republic of Tatarstan confirmed by the Order of Ministry of Interior of Russia dated 05.12.2006 № 981 "Confirmation of the Clause about Ministry of Interior of the Republic of Tatarstan".

Its headquarters is in 420111, Kazan, 19 Dzerzhinsky Street.

== Main functions ==
- Ensuring of protection of the human rights and freedom
- Organization of prevention, reveal, suppression and investigation of crime, prevention and suppression of administrative delinquency
- Ensuring of public order protection in Tatarstan
- Ensuring of road safety in Tatarstan
- Organization and control for turnover of civil and staff weapon, explosives in Tatarstan
- Organization and control for non-governmental (private) security and detective work in Tatarstan
- Organization of property protection of physical and juridical parties by the agreements
- Management of subordinate interior bodies, subdivisions and organizations
