= Jharkhand Public Service Commission =

State government agency

- JPSC

Constitutional body overview
- Formed: 1 November 2000; 25 years ago
- Jurisdiction: Jharkhand
- Status: Active
- Headquarters: Circular Rd, Deputy Para, Ahirtoli, Ranchi, Jharkhand
- Constitutional body executive: L. Khiangte (IAS)
- Parent department: Government of Jharkhand
- Website: jpsc.gov.in

The Jharkhand Public Service Commission (JPSC) is a government agency of the state of Jharkhand, India, established as per Article 315 of the Constitution of India, for conducting recruitment of candidates for various state government jobs through competitive examinations. It is headquartered in Ranchi, Jharkhand.

== History ==
The history of JPSC started with the merging of 18 districts of Bihar to form Jharkhand state, accompanied by its state commission under Article 315 of the Constitution of India. It came into existence in 15 November 2000.

The core purpose of JPSC has been to handle recruitment for government positions within the state. This involves conducting written exams and interviews to select qualified candidates for the government jobs and other positions under the JPSC's jurisdiction.

== Functions and responsibilities ==
The commission is permitted to function in accordance with the constitution of India and Union Public Service Commission which provides it the state public service commission amendments.

- Making recruitments to state organizations and departmental posts.
- Conducting competitive examinations in the state.
- Conducting interviews, screening tests, and written test.
- Advising to state government on the suitability of officers for their appointment on promotion.
- Transferring the personnel from one service to another.
- Heading disciplinary cases under its jurisdiction.

== Commission profile ==
The Commission is supervised under the state governor and headed by commission's Chairman and members for their specific roles.

Designation	Current office holder
Chairman	L. Khiangte
Secretary	Himanshu Mohan
Deputy Secretary	Niraj Kumari
Deputy Secretary	Manisha Joseph Tigga
Controller of Examination	Moinuddin Khan
Deputy Controller of Examination	Gyan Prakash Minz
Member	Smt. Ajita Bhattacharya
Member	Dr. Anima Hansda
Member	Dr. Jamal Ahmad

== See also ==
- List of Public service commissions in India
