= Nekhayevskaya =

Rural locality in Volgograd Oblast, Russia

Coordinates: 50°24′30″N 41°45′00″E

Nekhayevskaya (Russian: Нехаевская) is a rural locality (a stanitsa) and the administrative center of Nekhayevsky District of Volgograd Oblast, Russia. Population: 4,679 (2010 census); 4,704 (2002 census); 4,390 (1989 Soviet census).
