= Nekhayevsky District =

Nekhayevsky District Нехаевский район
- District
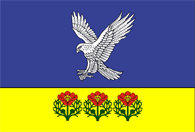
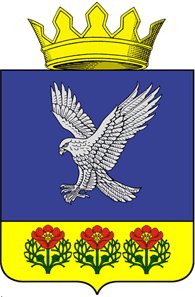
- Flag Coat of arms
- Location of Nekhayevsky District in Volgograd Oblast
- Coordinates: 50°24′N 41°45′E
- Country: Russia
- Federal subject: Volgograd Oblast
- Established: 1928
- Administrative center: Nekhayevskaya

Area
  - Total: 2,220 km^{2} (860 sq mi)

Population (2010 Census)
  - Total: 15,588
  - Density: 7.02/km^{2} (18.2/sq mi)
  - Urban: 0%
  - Rural: 100%

Administrative structure
  - Administrative divisions: 14 selsoviet
  - Inhabited localities: 50 rural localities

Municipal structure
  - Municipally incorporated as: Nekhayevsky Municipal District
  - Municipal divisions: 0 urban settlements, 13 rural settlements
- Time zone: UTC+3 (MSK)
- OKTMO ID: 18634000

Nekhayevsky District (Russian: Неха́евский райо́н) is an administrative district (raion), one of the thirty-three in Volgograd Oblast, Russia. Municipally, it is incorporated as Nekhayevsky Municipal District. It is located in the northwest of the oblast. The area of the district is 2,220 square kilometers (860 sq mi). Its administrative center is the rural locality (a stanitsa) of Nekhayevskaya. Population: 15,588 (2010 Census); 17,660 (2002 Census); 19,080 (1989 Soviet census). The population of Nekhayevskaya accounts for 30.0% of the district's total population.
