= Gen Z protests =

Ongoing worldwide youth protests

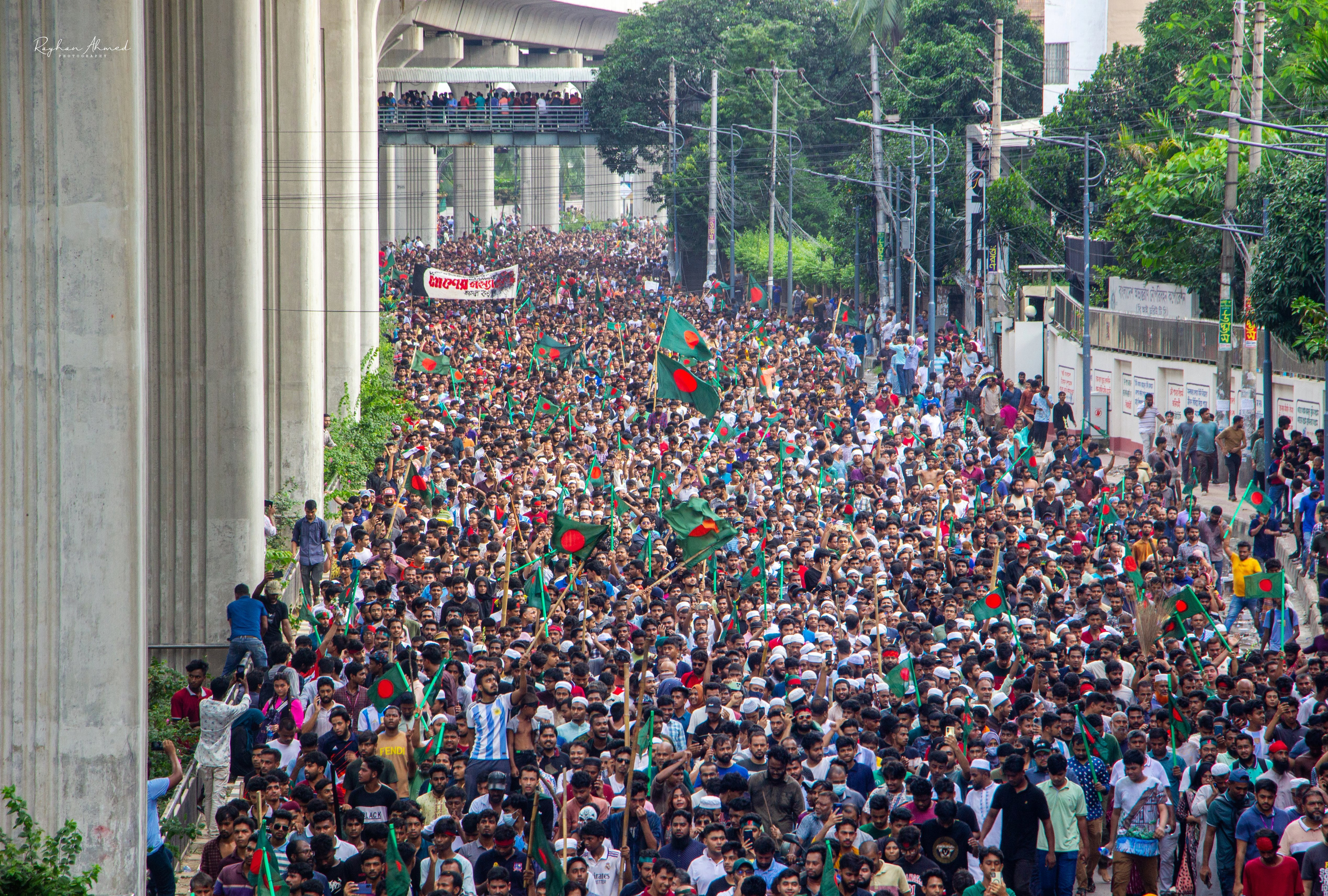
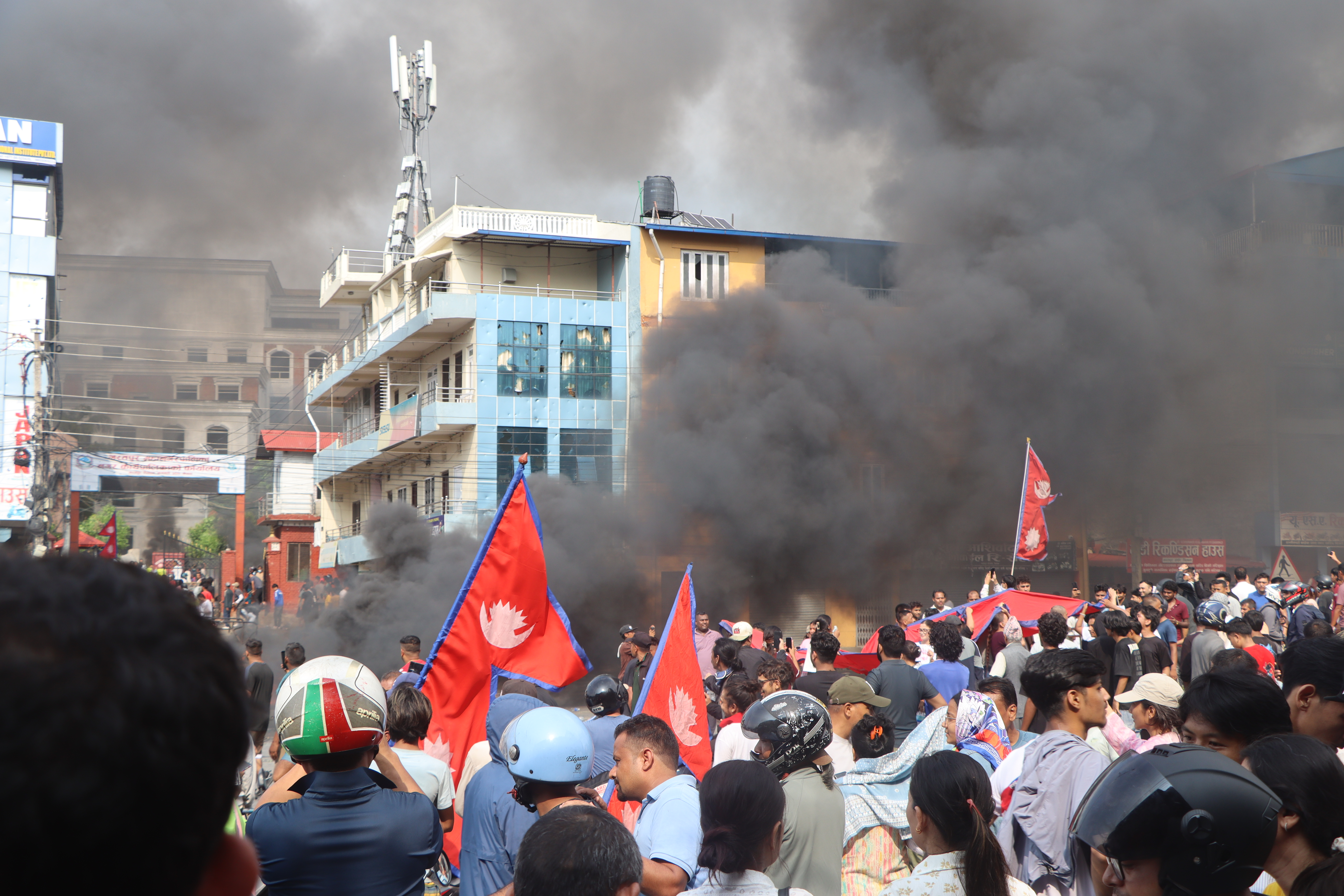
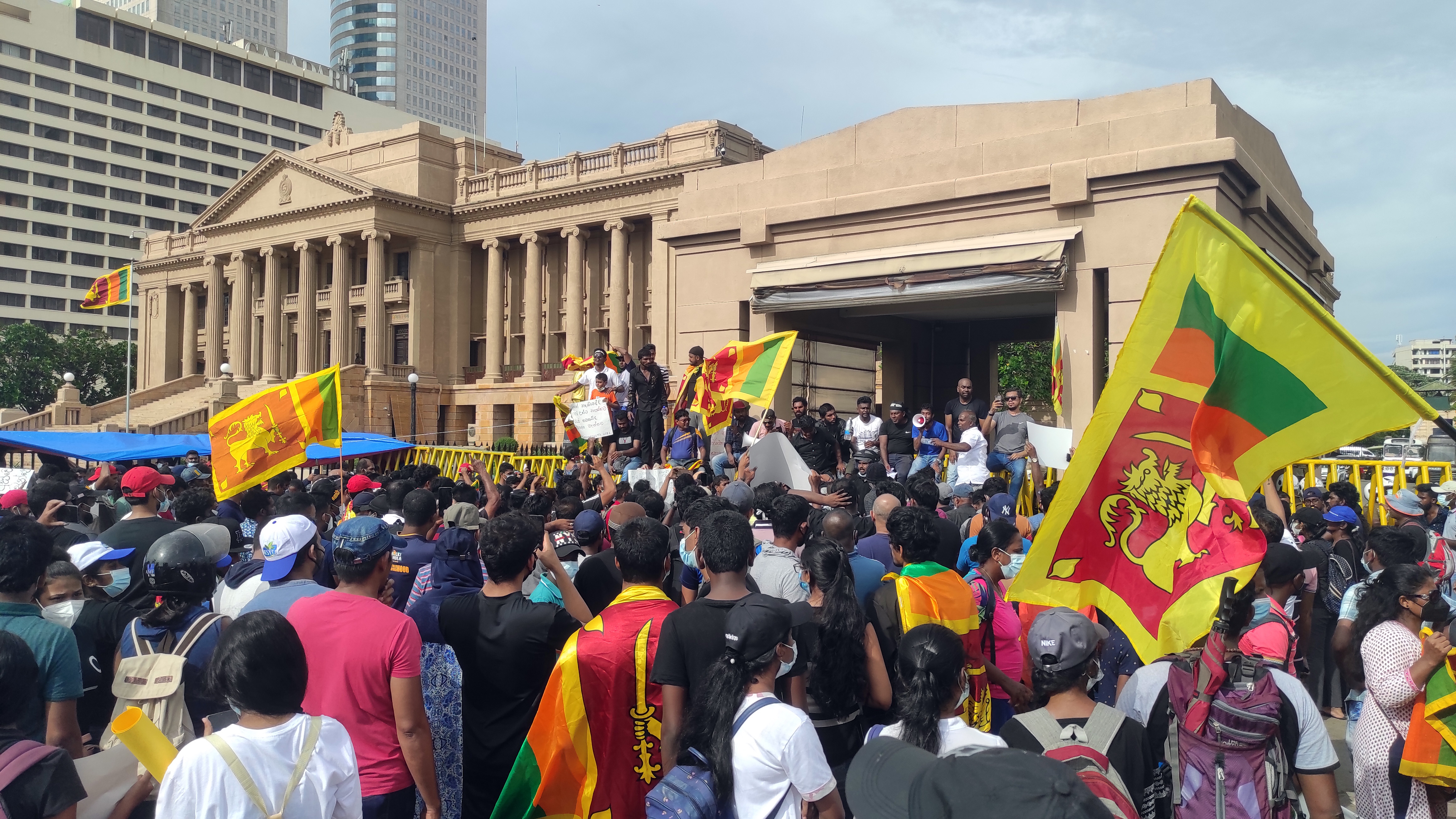
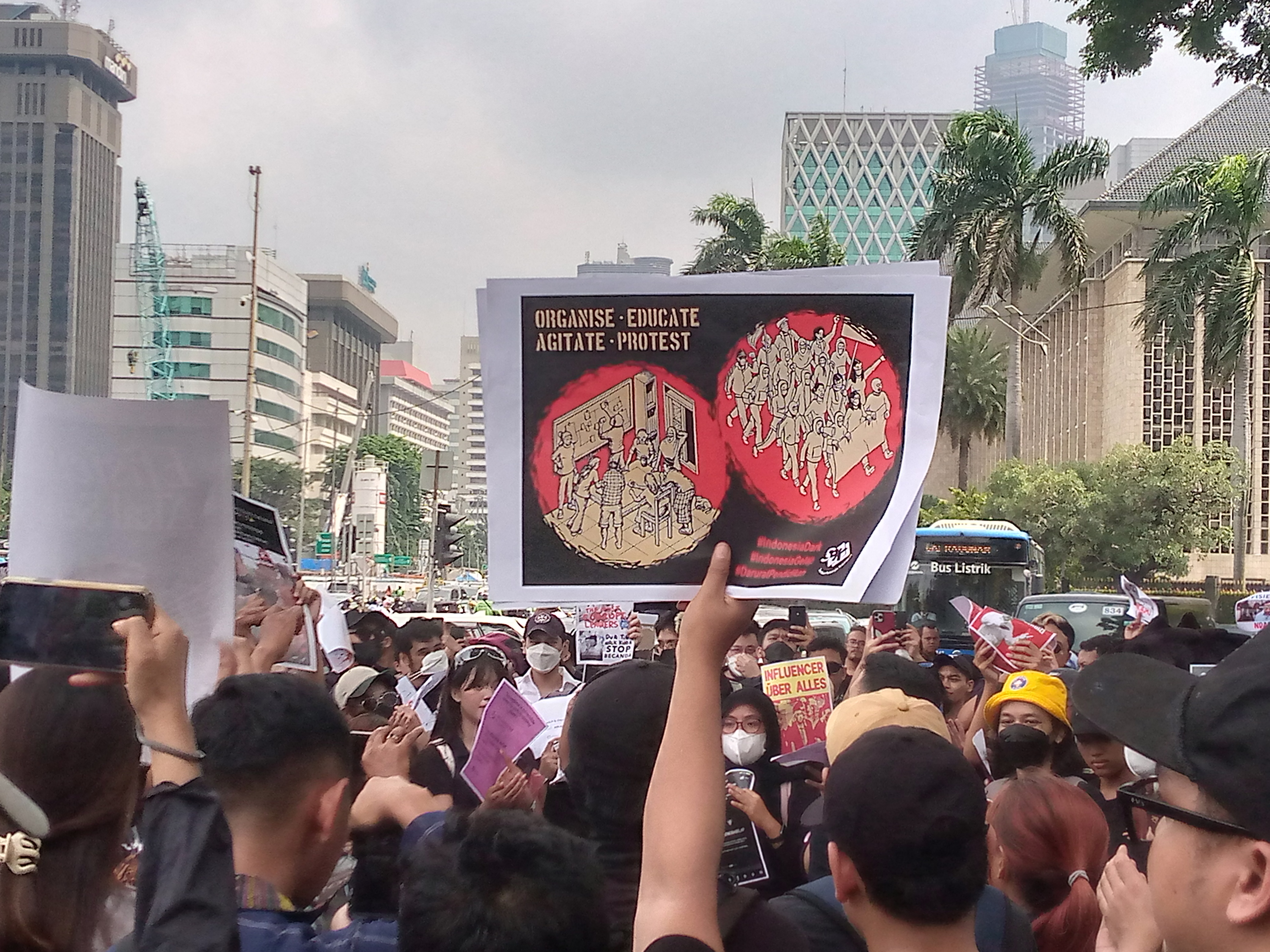
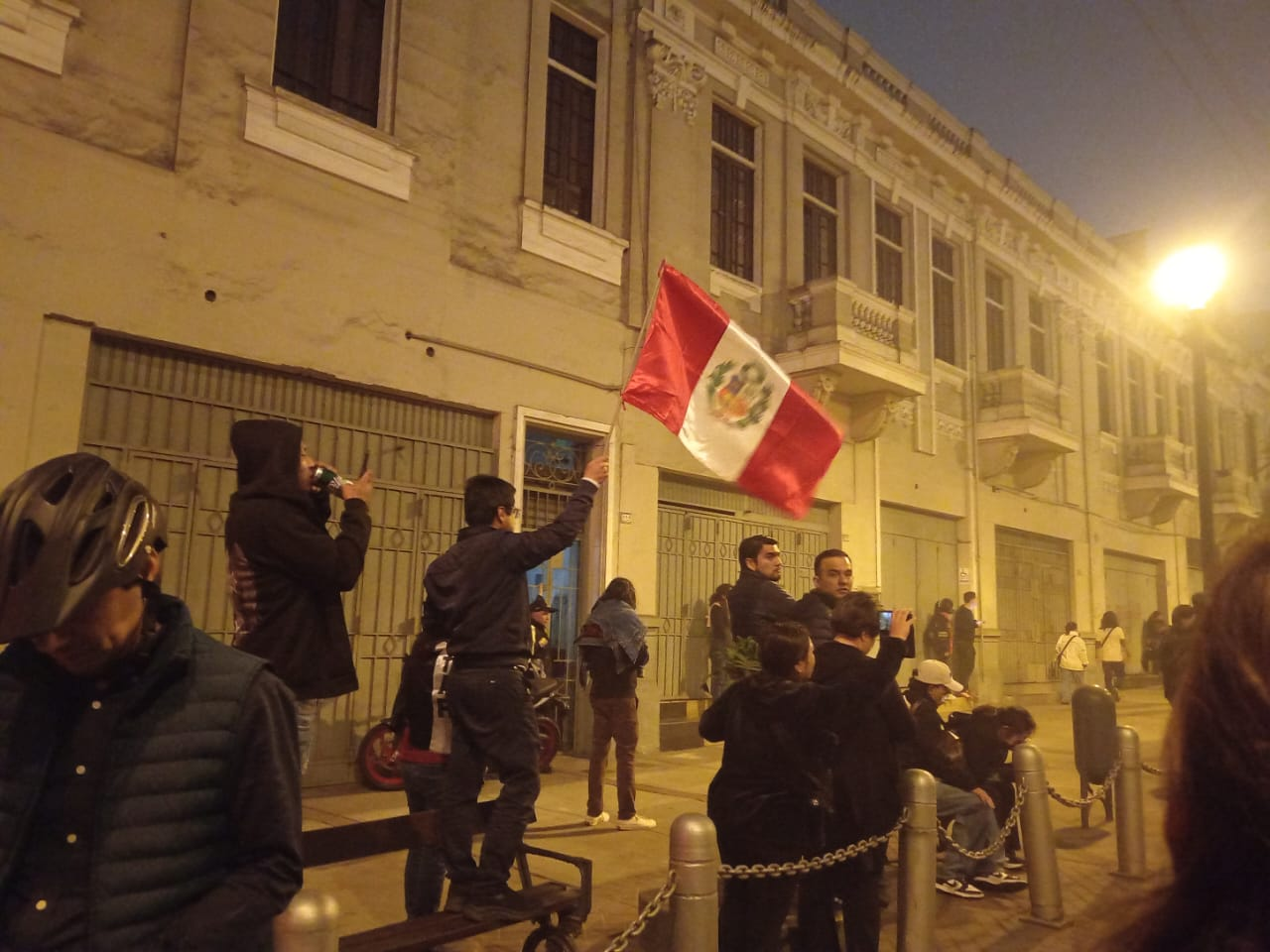
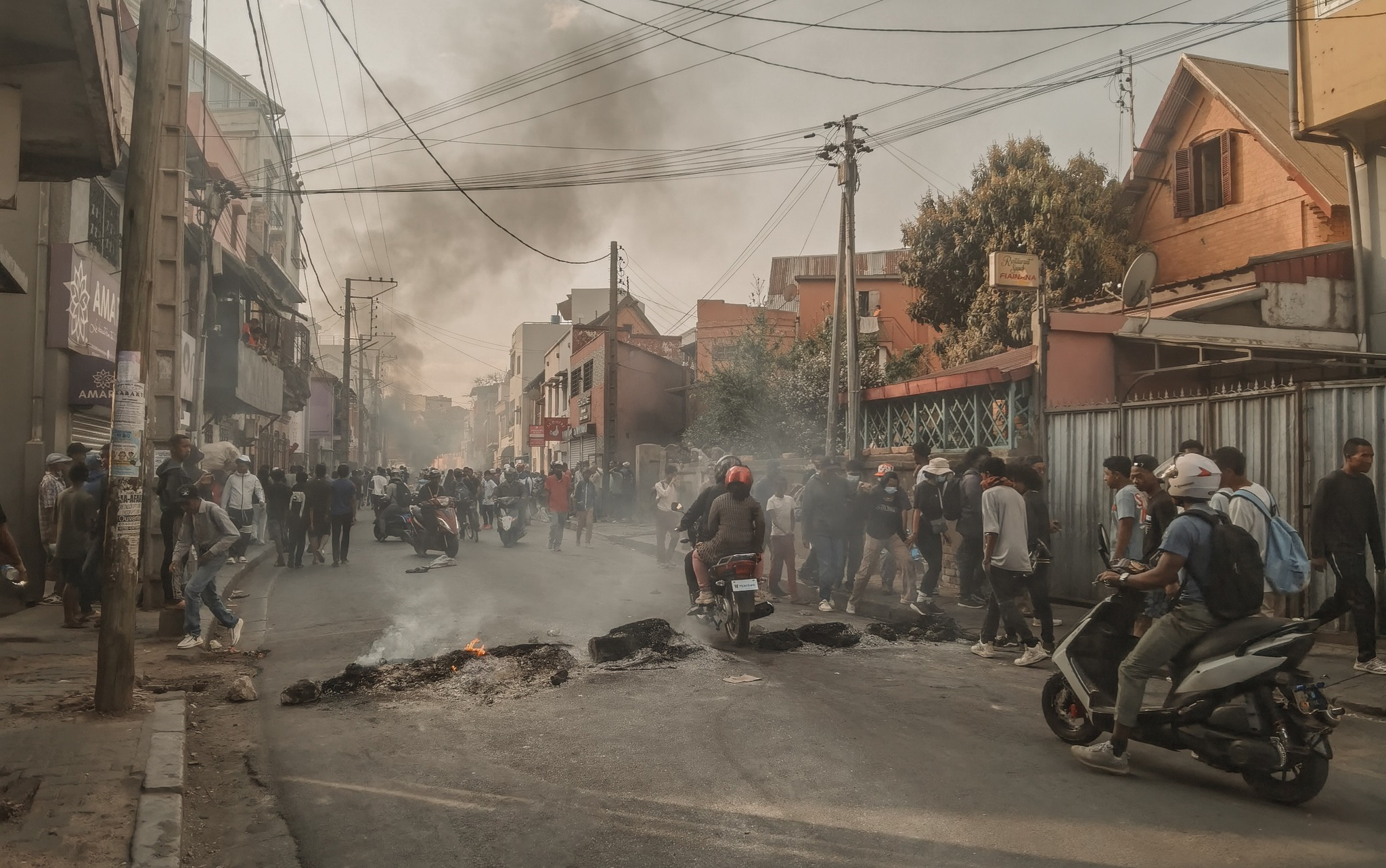
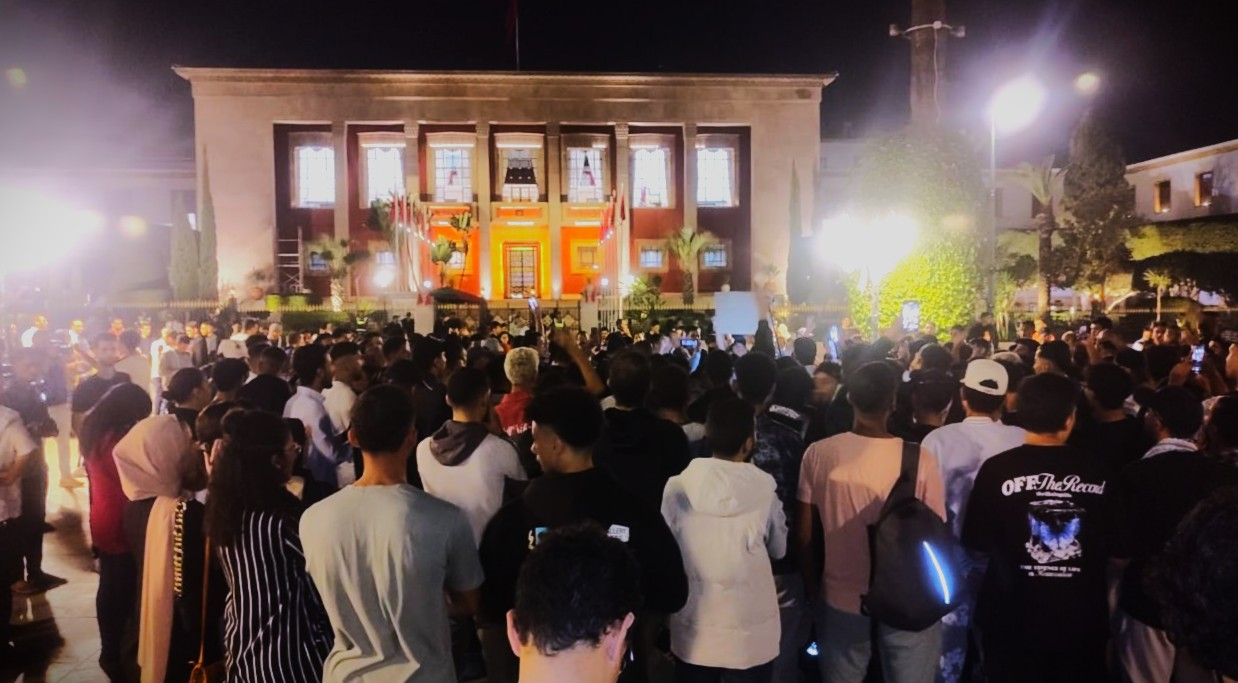
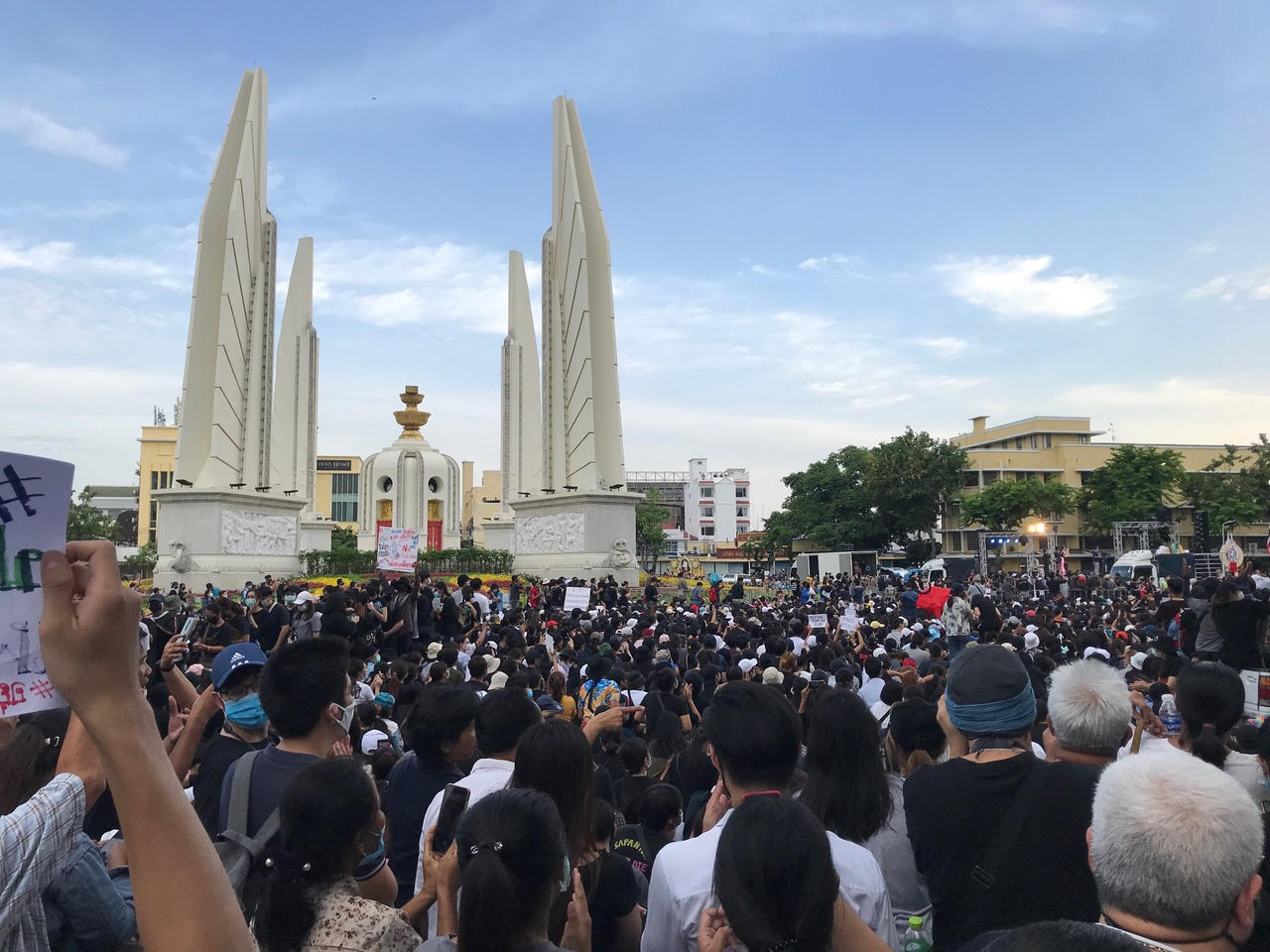
- Bangladesh Nepal Sri Lanka Indonesia Peru France Madagascar Morocco Thailand
- Date: c. February 2020 – present (approx. 6 years, 9 months)
- Location: Asia, Africa, Europe, Latin America
- Caused by: Third wave of autocratization; Democratic backsliding; COVID-19 pandemic; Economic and social inequality; Declining living standards; Kleptocracy; Political corruption; Cost-of-living crisis; Gaza genocide; Police brutality; Nepotism; Austerity; Oligarchy; Youth unemployment; Corruption
- Methods: Political demonstration; General strike; Student activism; Internet activism
- Result: § Demonstrations described as Gen Z protests

The Gen Z protests are a series of ongoing political demonstrations, uprisings, and revolutions predominantly led by Generation Z, those born from the mid-to-late 1990s to the early 2010s. While Gen Z has been politically active since the early 2010s, the current wave of protests emerged in the early 2020s.

The 2024 July Uprising in Bangladesh is widely cited as the first successful "Gen Z" revolution. However, the Kenyan youth online mobilisation against controversial tax regimens in May 2024 is the earliest direct use of the term "Gen Z protests", which spilled over to street protests in June 2024. Britannica describes Sri Lanka's 2022 uprising as "perhaps... the first time that Gen Z toppled a national government". Gen Z protests in other Asian countries have since followed, including a successful revolution in Nepal. By 2025 and 2026, the protests had spread worldwide to Asia, Africa, Europe and Latin America.

Although the specific causes of the protests depend on the region, they have generally been in response to perceived social inequality, rising costs of living, corruption and authoritarianism. Protests have also addressed international issues, such as the war in Gaza.

As the first true digitally native generation, Gen Z has used social media as a common tool for activism and coordination. Bangladesh and Nepal have also seen the emergence of the world's first Gen Z political parties, the National Citizen Party and Rastriya Swatantra Party, whose candidates became the world's first Gen Z leaders elected as members of parliament.

== Background ==
The first unrest Generation Z experienced was related to the Great Recession and, later into adulthood of some, issues surrounding the COVID-19 pandemic. According to the Carnegie Endowment for International Peace, as of March 2026, there have been at least 120 "significant anti-government protests" in no less than 73 countries over the last 12 months, the largest figures since 2017.

=== Causes ===
The demonstrations have had several causes, varying from country to country. However, they generally relate to dissatisfaction with ruling governments, economic turmoil, claims of corruption, and a large, disaffected, often unemployed youth population that experienced declining standards of living due to difficulty accessing basic utilities and resources. Rising social inequality has also been described as forming the common thread of the protests and riots caused by Gen Z around the world,

The Bloomberg Economics study examined possible impetuses for Gen Z protests on a country-by-country basis, finding income inequality to be a leading cause of youth mobilization in Peru and Mexico. Political corruption was a key driver of unrest in the Philippines, while extreme poverty and inadequate access to basic sanitation and clean water drove actions in Madagascar. Carnegie's Global Protest Tracker likewise identified state corruption as a primary catalyst for protests, with anti-democratic excesses and economic difficulties as secondary ones.

=== Early Gen Z activism (2018–2023) ===
Gen Z political mobilization started to be recorded as early as in 2010. The earliest known example is during the 2010 United Kingdom student protests, where it was reported that a significant percentage of other people at the protests were part of Gen Z. In October 2015, as part of the Peruvian protests against Las Bambas mining project, a Gen Z group organized and pursued a protest that culminated in a March to Congress.

During the 2013 Gezi Park protests in Turkey, the 15-year-old Berkin Elvan was killed after a police officer struck him in the head by a tear-gas canister. Following his death, children participated in various protests. It is worth noting however, that the average age during the Gezi Park protests was 28.

The first recorded Gen-Z led protests emerged in response to gun violence in the United States, specifically to the Parkland high school shooting on 14 February 2018. March for Our Lives, a student-led organisation formed by survivors of the shooting, led a national school walkout in March 2018. Students staged a walkout again on 20 April 2018, the 19th anniversary of the Columbine High School massacre.

Fridays for Future, launched by Greta Thunberg on 20 August 2018, was the first instance in which a series of protests was ever defined as "Gen Z protests", specifically in a December 2019 article by Ipsos. The term was again used to describe the 2020–2021 Thai pro-democracy protests. While the term was not used to describe the Black Lives Matter protests beginning in 2020, 41% of protesters were between the ages of 18–29. Similarly, the "Social outburst" in Chile from 2019 to 2020 was triggered by mass fare evasions by high school students born between 2001 and 2005, but is not generally labeled a Gen Z protest.

In 2022, the Aragalaya led to the overthrowal of the Sri Lankan government, with youths playing a major part by carrying out protests at Galle Face Green.

=== Revolutions (2024–present) ===
The protests in Bangladesh in 2024 are widely cited as the first successful Gen Z revolution in the world, inspiring similar Gen Z protests in other Asian countries including Nepal, Indonesia, Philippines, Timor-Leste, and the Maldives. The term was later used to describe the 2024 Kenya Finance Bill protests, a largely Gen Z lead mass rioting movement against a controversial tax hike.

The term garnered wider global popularity following the ousting of the Nepali government in 2025 and a string of concurrent protests that occurred around and after it. The global wave of demonstrations then reached further with similar youth-led protests springing up in Madagascar and Morocco. In September, an unpopular pension reform and corruption scandal further sparked a self-styled "Gen Z march" in Lima, Peru. The Gen Z protests had thus by that month reached the continents of Asia, Africa, Europe, and Latin America. At the end of September, Italian media noted the large involvement of Gen Z protesters in the country's general strikes and protests for Gaza. By the beginning of October, the year 2025 was even described as a potential "year of the protest", a title that was previously applied to the year 2019.

In 2026, French students and teachers started a series of protests against poor school conditions. Protests have since grown, as labor unions and other political movements joined to protest against the rising fuel prices and cost-of-living among the population, with 500,000–800,000 people reportedly taking part across the country.

== Methods ==
=== Social media ===
Members of Generation Z, who grew up in the age of the Internet, have commonly used social media as a platform to organize and coordinate protests and riots. The use of social media as foundational to movement-building emerged during the Arab Spring and Occupy movement, primarily led by millennials.

Protestors in Morocco and Nepal frequently exchanged plans via the messaging platform Discord, and other apps like Instagram, TikTok and Telegram have also been noted as platforms for communication and spreading their agenda. In Morocco, the "GenZ 212" Discord server surged from 3,000 members to over 150,000 by 2 October.

While previous protests in Nepal were initially peaceful or limited to online activity, a government ban on social media in September 2025 spurred direct action, with Gen Z protestors criticizing the ban as censorship. At the time of the ban, the protestors were vocalizing their dissent to alleged corruption and nepotism through the dissemination of short videos on Facebook and TikTok. Following the overthrow of the Nepalese government, online coordination, in particular Discord, was used to elect an interim prime minister.

A 2025 study by Bloomberg Economics assessed dynamics surrounding Gen Z protests, finding a correlation between social media penetration, common age connection, and increased social discontent over issues such as socio-economic inequality, unemployment, and corruption.

=== Symbols ===
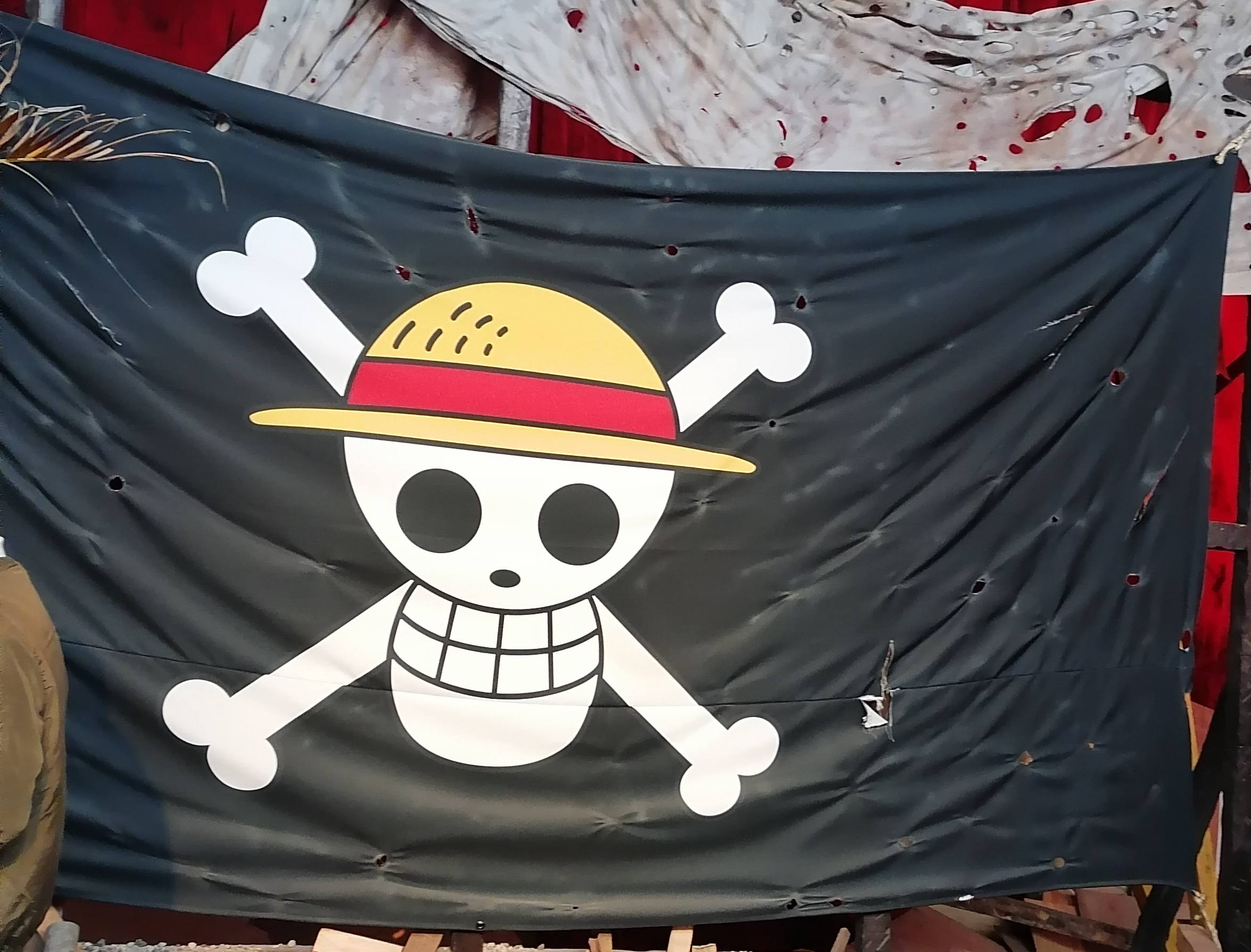
The Straw Hat Pirates' Jolly Roger from One Piece

In various Gen Z protests, the Straw Hats' Jolly Roger from the manga One Piece has been used as an international symbol of the protests. The flag was used in the protests in Indonesia, Madagascar, Nepal and Bulgaria.

The first and the earliest use of the Straw Hat Pirate flag in protest activity in real-life world, was in Yogyakarta, Indonesia, in October 2023 when thousands of Indonesians protested the Gaza war and Gaza crisis. Almost two years later, student protesters in Indonesia had begun flying the flag again in February 2025. The flag came into prominence during the 2025 Indonesian anti-government protests which started in the weeks leading up to Indonesia's Independence Day on 17 August.

In Nepal, when the government of K. P. Sharma Oli was toppled in Nepal, protesters hung the flag at the gates of the Singha Durbar palace as it burned. It has also been used in the Philippines, Peru, and Madagascar. The response to the use of the Straw Hat flag has been harsh, with an Indonesian lawmaker saying it was an attempt to divide national unity and another suggesting it could amount to treason, drawing criticism from Amnesty International.

In the United States, many protesters utilised the design of Manny Heffley from the Diary of a Wimpy Kid book series during the George Floyd protests to oppose police brutality and support the Black Lives Matter movement. On June 8, 2020, a satirical TikTok post of someone drawing the symbol during a protest went viral. It then began to trend alongside the phrase "the Manny will not be televised." Users created a flag parodying that of the US, featuring black and yellow stripes and the drawing of Manny in the canton. Graffiti featuring Manny alongside anti-police slogans including All cops are bastards and Fuck 12.

In Southeast Asian countries, other pop culture symbols have been used to signal defiance as well, among them references to Harry Potter and the three-finger salute from The Hunger Games. Raqib Naik, director of the Center for the Study of Organised Hate, said "I think we are entering a new era of organising that draws heavily from digital, pop and gaming culture, creating a common vocabulary".

== Demonstrations described as Gen Z protests ==
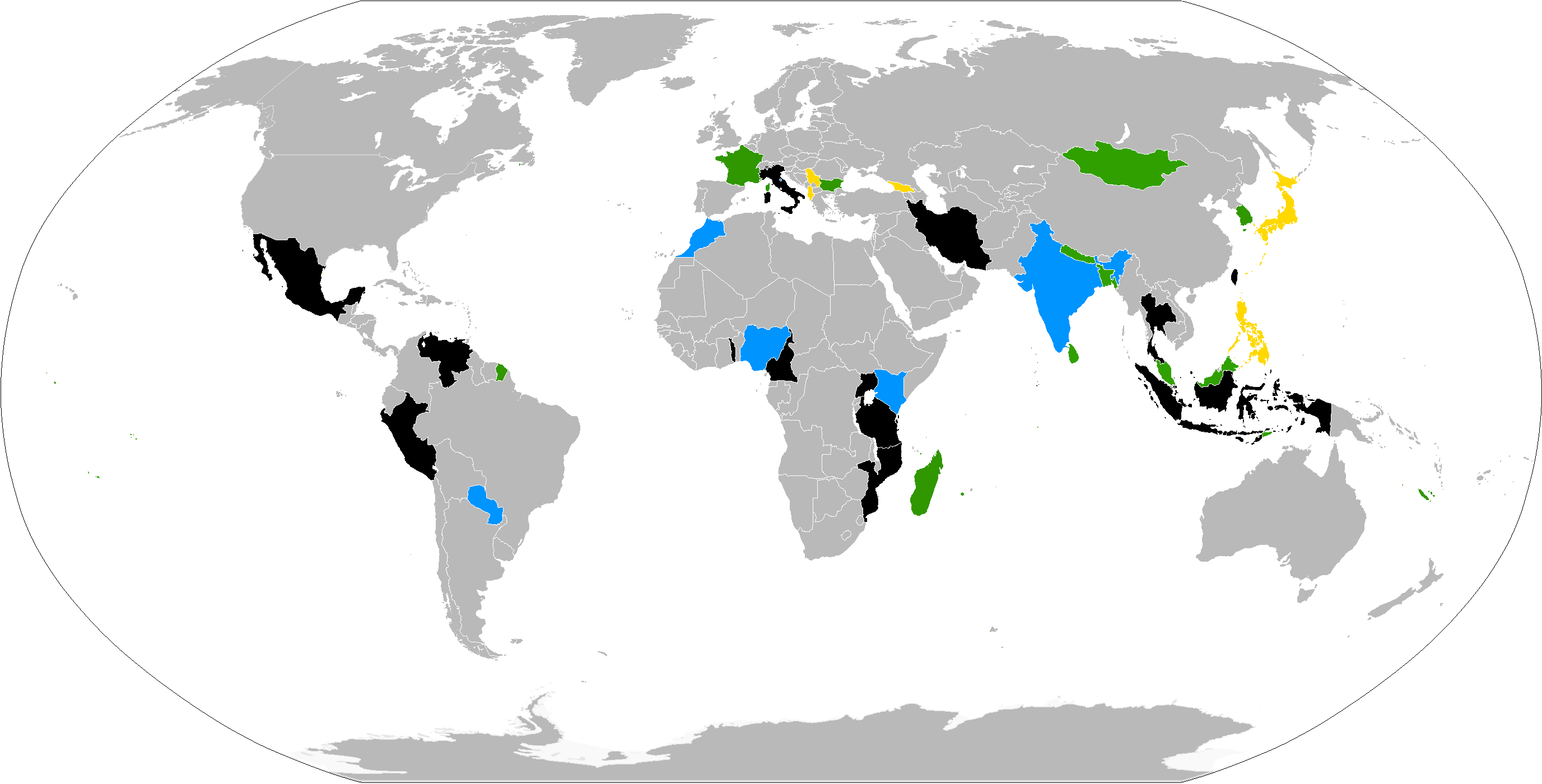
Ongoing protests (as of November 2026) Successful protests; government overthrown or changed Successful protests; government applied the desired reform Protests have occurred previously, with no success

=== Ended ===
Countries	Duration	Cause(s)	Results	Outcome	Ref.
2020
Thailand	2020–2021 Thai protests 23 February 2020 – December 2021	Human rights abuses and legal inequality; Political corruption scandals; Distrust in the 2019 general election and political system; Dissolution of the Future Forward Party; Democratic and economic regression since the 2014 Thai coup d'état; Government response to the Covid-19 pandemic; Expansion of royal prerogative and lèse majesté; Forced disappearances and deaths of political activists; Dissatisfaction with the education system	Failed: "Severe" state of emergency declared in Bangkok from 15 to 22 October 2020; Protesters' demands, including calls for constitutional amendment, failed; Constitutional Court rules that proposing reform of the monarchy is unconstitutional and amounts to acting to overthrow it; Suppression and surveillance of key protesters; 2023 Thai general election; Attempted assassination of Paetongtarn Shinawatra; 2025 Thai political crisis	Major protests	
Nigeria	End SARS; 3 October 2020 – 20 October 2021	Killings, assaults, and harassment by SARS officials in Nigeria; Lack of freedom of expression; 2020 Lekki shooting	Successful: SARS unit dissolved on 11 October 2020; Government response to protests on 20 October 2020 leads to several deaths	Protests and governmental changes	
2022
Sri Lanka	Aragalaya; 15 March – 14 November 2022	Corruption and Nepotism; Economic crisis and mismanagement; Fuel and power shortages; High inflation and cost-of-living; Authoritarianism and unpopularity of the Rajapaksa family	Successful: Over 50 MPs aligned with the SLPP government became independent in the Parliament; Resignation of the Second Gotabaya Rajapaksa cabinet and Finance Minister Basil Rajapaksa; Nandalal Weerasinghe replaces Ajith Cabraal as Central Bank Governor; Resignation of prime minister Mahinda Rajapaksa and appointment of Ranil Wickremesinghe; Gotabaya Rajapaksa resigns as president and goes into exile; Wickremesinghe is elected as president by Parliament on July 20; Dinesh Gunawardena is appointed prime minister; Anura Kumara Dissanayake wins the 2024 Sri Lankan presidential election	Government overthrown	
Iran	Mahsa Amini protests 16 September 2022 – 2023	Judicial system of the Islamic Republic of Iran; Death of Mahsa Amini	Failed: Hundreds of people killed and tens of thousands beaten and/or detained in government crackdown	Major protests	
2024
Kenya	Kenya Finance Bill protests 18 June – 8 August 2024	Kenya Finance Bill 2024; Government corruption and authoritarianism	Successful: Finance bill is unsigned and revoked	Protests and governmental changes	
Bangladesh	July Uprising; 6 June – 5 August 2024	Authoritarianism and human rights abuses under the Sheikh Hasina regime; Economic depression; Retainment of the controversial job quota system; July massacre	Successful: Prime minister Sheikh Hasina resigned and left the country; 2024 Bangladesh constitutional crisis; Creation of interim government of Muhammad Yunus; BNP wins a landslide victory at the 2026 Bangladeshi general election	Government overthrown	
Venezuela	2024 Venezuelan protests 28 July 2024 – 10 January 2025	Election fraud in the 2024 Venezuelan presidential election; Social and political crisis; Corruption and authoritarianism	Failed: Protests quelled by the government; Beginning of Operation Southern Spear	Major protests	
Mozambique	2024–2025 Mozambican protests 11 October 2024 – 24 March 2025	Electoral fraud in the 2024 Mozambican general election	Failed: Daniel Chapo inaugurated 15 January; Chapo and Mondlane reach amnesty agreement for protesters 23 March	Major protests	
Serbia	2024–2026 Serbian protests 1 November 2024 – 25 October 2026	Democratic backsliding in Serbia; Corruption; Novi Sad railway station canopy collapse; Censorship in Serbia; Authoritarianism; Police brutality; Stagnation of EU accession talks	Successful: Resignation of Aleksandar Vučić and several other politicians; Dissolution of parliament and calling of snap elections; Several documents related to the reconstruction of the Novi Sad railway station published; Increase in the budget for higher education by 20 percent; Victory of the Student List and defeat of Vučić's coalition in the parliamentary election of 2026	Government overthrown	
Taiwan	Taiwanese lightstick protests 18 December 2024 – 23 August 2025	Proposal of the Three Big Bills in Taiwan by the Kuomintang and Taiwan People's Party	Failed: Three Big Bills are delayed, but passed anyway after third hearing; 2025 Taiwanese mass electoral recall campaigns	Major protests	
South Korea	South Korean lightstick protests 3 December 2024 – 4 April 2026	Declaration of martial law by President Yoon Suk Yeol	Successful: Self-Coup attempt by Yoon Suk Yeol failed; Impeachment of Yoon Suk Yeol; Snap presidential election held on 3 June 2025; Lee Jae Myung elected as president; Constitutional Court overturns the Impeachment of Han Duck-soo	Government overthrown	
2025
North Macedonia	Kočani nightclub fire protests 16 March – 5 July 2025	Government corruption and negligence; Lack of accountability for the nightclub fire	Partially successful: Criminal charges opened against multiple people and organizations related to the accident; 3 police officers given suspended sentences by the Basic Criminal Court of Skopje for abusing their positions	Protests and governmental changes	
Hungary	Hungarian Pride parade ban protests 18 March – 4 October 2025	Nationwide ban on pride parades; Censorship; Illiberalism	Partially successful: Holding of Budapest Pride on 28 June; Ban scrapped by newly elected government in 2026; Charges against organizers dropped	Protests and governmental changes	
Mongolia	2025 Mongolian protests 14 May – 3 June 2025	Corruption; Unpopularity of prime minister Luvsannamsrain Oyun-Erdene; Economic crisis and inflation	Successful: Resignation of prime minister Oyun-Erdene; New coalition government established by the ruling MPP; 2025 Mongolian political crisis	Government overthrown	
Togo	2025 Togolese protests 5 June – 8 December 2025	Arrest of the rapper Aamron; Unpopular constitutional reforms; Youth unemployment; Lack of democratic participation; Bad living conditions and high electricity costs; Authoritarianism	Failed: Every goal aside from the lowering of the electricity costs is not achieved; Loss of momentum for the 6.6 Movement in Togo	Major protests	
Ukraine	Cardboard Protests 22 July – 31 July 2025	Adoption of Bill No. 12414 removing the independence of anti-corruption agencies; Democratic backsliding	Successful: Passing of bill restoring agencies' independence	Protests and governmental changes	
Malaysia	Oust Anwar protests 26 July 2025	Public dissatisfaction with the government under the leadership of prime minister Anwar Ibrahim; Increasing prices of goods; High cost of living; Implementation of the Urban Renewal Act (URA); Increasing prices of Liquefied Petroleum Gas (LPG); Abolition of subsidies; Failure to carry out reforms; Implementation of Sales and Services and Tax (SST); Political intimidation	Successful: Reduction of petrol price; Distribution of US$3.55 billion cash handout; Freezing of the plan to raise toll price; Reinstatement of Prime Minister Anwar Ibrahim and cabinet reshuffle	Protests and governmental changes	
France	Bloquons tout September–October 2025	Austerity proposals; Opposition to Bayrou government	Successful: Bayrou government dissolved and replaced by the Lecornu government; 2023 pension reform law put on hold indefinitely; Continuation of the French political crisis	Government overthrown	
Nepal	2025 Nepalese protests 8–13 September 2025	Corruption and Nepotism; Social media ban; Police brutality and violence; Mismanagement of Public funds	Successful: Multiple government buildings and political offices set on fire; Resignation of prime minister K. P. Sharma Oli; Social media ban lifted; House of Representatives dissolved; Balen Shah wins the 2026 election	Government overthrown	
Peru	2025 Peruvian protests 13 September – 16 October 2025	Peruvian political crisis; Rise in crime and security crisis; Corruption and high unpopularity of both President Dina Boluarte's administration and the Congress; 2022-2023 Peruvian protests; Pension reform	Inconclusive: Impeachment of Dina Boluarte and censure of José Jerí; Congress rejects motion of dissolution; 30-day state of emergency declared on 10 October; Keiko Fujimori wins the 2026 Peruvian general election	Protests and governmental changes	
Timor-Leste	2025 Timor-Leste protests 15–17 September 2025	Proposed US$4 million budget to buy 65 new cars for members of Parliament	Successful: Purchase of cars cancelled; Pensions ended for former MPs	Protests and governmental changes	
Italy	2025 Italian protests 19 September – 29 November 2025	Gaza war (genocide, famine, Israeli blockade)	Failed: Up to 2 million protested in San Marino, Italy and Ticino; Israel compiled and published a detailed dossier on the protests and their participants; Recognition of Palestine by San Marino	Major protests	
San Marino	2025 Italian protests 19 September – 29 November 2025	Gaza war (genocide, famine, Israeli blockade)	Failed: Up to 2 million protested in San Marino, Italy and Ticino; Israel compiled and published a detailed dossier on the protests and their participants; Recognition of Palestine by San Marino	Major protests	
Switzerland (Ticino)	2025 Italian protests 19 September – 29 November 2025	Gaza war (genocide, famine, Israeli blockade)	Failed: Up to 2 million protested in San Marino, Italy and Ticino; Israel compiled and published a detailed dossier on the protests and their participants; Recognition of Palestine by San Marino	Major protests	
Maldives	2025 Maldivian protests 20 September – 18 November 2025	Media control law; Corruption	Failed: Media law ratified; Protesters granted amnesty	Major protests	
Madagascar	2025 Malagasy protests 25 September – 14 October 2025	Standards of living; Corruption	Successful: Dissolution of Ntsay government; 2025 Malagasy coup d'état; President Andry Rajoelina exiled and impeached; Formation of the CPRF led by Michael Randrianirina	Government overthrown	
Morocco	2025 Moroccan protests 27 September – 18 October 2025	Demands for increased government spending on healthcare and education; Corruption	Successful: Government raises healthcare and education spending to $15 billion in the 2026 budget, up 16% from the prior year; Financial incentives for young political candidates are provided; Construction and renovation of hospitals are provided; Government crackdowns resulted in at least three protester deaths and over 2,400 detentions including minors	Protests and governmental changes	
Paraguay	2025 Paraguayan protests 28 September – 3 October 2025	Corruption and Nepotism; Unpopularity of president Santiago Peña; Relocation of government agency for indigenous peoples in Paraguay	Successful: The government agency is moved back; The agency's head is replaced; Other demands not met, however protests have ended	Protests and governmental changes	
Pakistan	2025 Azad Kashmir protests 29 September – 7 November 2025	Economic instability; Political corruption and authoritarianism; Reservation of 12 seats in the Legislative Assembly for Kashmiri immigrants from India	Partially successful: Agreement reached between the Government of Pakistan and JKJAAC	Protests and governmental changes	
Cameroon	2025 Cameroonian protests 12 October – 1 December 2025	Allegations of electoral fraud in the 2025 Cameroonian presidential election; Authoritarianism and unpopularity of president Paul Biya; Corruption	Failed: Paul Biya remains in power; Opposition leader Issa Tchiroma fled country; Opposition leader Anicet Ekane dies in police custody	Major protests	
Tanzania	2025 Tanzanian protests 29 October – 7 November 2025	Allegations of electoral irregularities and lack of transparency in the 2025 general election; Authoritarianism of president Samia Suluhu Hassan; Internet blackout	Failed: Samia Suluhu Hassan remains in power; Curfew imposed in Dar es Salaam from 29 October – 4 November; Legal crackdown with 2,000 protest deaths and 240 arrests with treason charges on 7 November	Major protests	
Kenya (Namanga)	2025 Tanzanian protests 29 October – 7 November 2025	Allegations of electoral irregularities and lack of transparency in the 2025 general election; Authoritarianism of president Samia Suluhu Hassan; Internet blackout	Failed: Samia Suluhu Hassan remains in power; Curfew imposed in Dar es Salaam from 29 October – 4 November; Legal crackdown with 2,000 protest deaths and 240 arrests with treason charges on 7 November	Major protests	
Slovakia	Chalk Revolution 7 November – 3 December 2025	Police questioning of 19-year-old student after writing anti-government slogans with chalk; Eurosceptic, anti-Ukrainian and pro-Russian foreign policy of Fico government; Slovak opposition to sanctions on Russia	Failed: Movement fizzled out in December due to deteriorating weather; Continuation as part of the broader 2024–2026 Slovak protests	Major protests	
Mexico	2025 Mexican protests 15 November – 14 December 2025	Assassination of Uruapan Mayor Carlos Manzo; Failure of federal government to address cartel violence; Government corruption	Failed: Attendance declined in December 2025	Major protests	
Bulgaria	2025–2026 Bulgarian protests 26 November 2025 – 14 January 2026	Corruption; 2026 budget	Successful: Government withdraws budget proposal; Resignation of the Zhelyazkov Government; Progressive Bulgaria wins a landslide victory at the 2026 Bulgarian parliamentary election	Government overthrown	
2026
Uganda	2026 Ugandan protests 16 – 20 January 2026	Discontent with the 40-year dictatorship of Yoweri Museveni; Allegations of electoral fraud in the 2026 Ugandan general election; Authoritarianism; Corruption; Internet blackout	Failed: Yoweri Museveni remains in power; Opposition leader Bobi Wine leaves Uganda	Major protests	
Bolivia	2026 Bolivian protests 1 May – 23 June 2026	Economic and fuel crisis; Opposition to president Rodrigo Paz	Partially successful: Deal struck between the Bolivian Workers' Center and the government, all blockades cleared	Protests and governmental changes	
Ukraine	2026 Ukrainian protests 15 July – 19 August 2026	Dismissal of Mykhailo Fedorov as Minister of Defence	Partially successful: Resignation of Deputy Commander of the Ukrainian Air Force Pavlo Yelizarov; Yevhenii Khmara appointed Minister of Defence by President Volodymyr Zelenskyy; Mykhailo Drapatyi replaces Oleksandr Syrskyi as Commander-in-Chief of the Armed Forces	Protests and governmental changes	
Brazil	2026 Brazilian protests 5 – 26 October 2026	2026 Brazilian general election; Opposition to candidate Flávio Bolsonaro	Partially successful: Luiz Inácio Lula da Silva wins the presidential election; Flávio Bolsonaro flees to the United States	Protests and governmental changes	

=== Ongoing ===
Countries	Duration	Cause(s)	Results	Ref.
2024
Georgia	2024–2026 Georgian protests 28 October 2024 – present	Electoral fraud; Disputed election results; Reluctance of government to join the European Union; Democratic backsliding in Georgia	Ongoing: Increase in authoritarianism marked by surveillance expansion and restrictive laws on NGOs and media; Use of excessive force and instances of torture to disperse protests, causing riots and hundreds of injuries with no accountability; Approximately 50+ political prisoners, activists, and protest participants detained on politically motivated charges, according to civil society; Opposition figures and leaders arrested and jailed in a wave of mass detentions; Failed attempt to overthrow the government in October 2025; organizers and numerous participants arrested	
2025
Indonesia	2025–2026 Indonesian protests 14 February 2025 – present	House of Representatives allowance hike; Economic frustration; Police brutality; General opposition to the current government; Controversial policies of Prabowo Subianto and Gibran Rakabuming Raka	Ongoing: Cabinet of President Prabowo Subianto reshuffled and several laws and policies revised	
Turkey	2025–2026 Turkish protests 19 March 2025 – present	Detention and arrest of Ekrem İmamoğlu; Authoritarianism of Recep Tayyip Erdoğan; Censorship in Turkey	Ongoing: Arrests of protestors and expulsions of journalists; Social media censorship	
Northern Cyprus	2025–2026 Turkish protests 19 March 2025 – present	Detention and arrest of Ekrem İmamoğlu; Authoritarianism of Recep Tayyip Erdoğan; Censorship in Turkey	Ongoing: Arrests of protestors and expulsions of journalists; Social media censorship	
United States	No Kings protests 14 June 2025 – present	Tariffs in the second Trump administration; High inflation, income inequality and fuel crisis; Corruption and democratic backsliding; One Big Beautiful Bill; Shootings by U.S. immigration agents; Police brutality; Federal government shutdowns; Iran and Gaza wars; Mismanagement of the Epstein files; Discontent with the Healthcare sector	Ongoing: Republican Party suffers a landslide defeat in the midterm elections	
Tunisia	2025-2026 Tunisian protests August 2025 – present	Government corruption and authoritarianism; Economic stagnation and power blackouts; Environmental and climate concerns	Ongoing: Protests outside Gabès largely subsized; Chaima Issa and several other activists arrested by authorities	
Philippines	2025–2026 Philippine protests 4 September 2025 – present	Arrest of Rodrigo Duterte; Corruption; Flood control projects controversy; Political rivalry between Dutertismo and Marcosism	Ongoing: Investigations into "ghost" projects underway	
Germany	2025–2026 German student strikes 5 December 2025 – present	Reintroduction of mandatory registration and possible reintroduction of compulsory conscription; Unpopularity of chancellor Friedrich Merz	Ongoing: Suspension of travel-notification requirement by defense ministry	
Iran	2025–2026 Iranian protests 28 December 2025 – present	Discontent with the ruling Islamic republic; Economic impact of the Iran-Israel war; Record low of the Iranian rial exchange rate; Hyperinflation; Water crisis; Corruption and Censorship; International sanctions; State terrorism; Lack of women's rights; Internet blackout	Ongoing: Resignation of Political Adviser to the President Mehdi Sanaei; Abdolnaser Hemmati replaces Mohammad Reza Farzin as head of the Central Bank; U.S. President Donald Trump threatens to intervene on behalf of the protesters; Coup attempt by former President Hassan Rouhani and foreign minister Mohammed Javad Zarif failed; Rouhani and Javad Zarif put under house arrest; Supreme Security minister Ali Larijani made the de facto ruler and 2nd most powerful person in Iran until his assassination; Protests suppressed by force with the help of Iraqi, Lebanese, Afghan, and Pakistani Shia militias; Protests mostly quelled by 16 January 2026, but reignited since 17 February; Assassination of Ali Khamenei and start of the 2026 Iran war	
2026
Albania	Flamingo Revolution; 2 February 2026 – present	Government corruption; Media censorship; State capture; Autocratization; Police brutality; Land ownership disputes and environmental concerns in protected coastal zones; Opposition to a proposed luxury tourism development project in the Portonovo area and Sazan Island	Ongoing: Licences of 2 private security companies revoked; SPAK investigation opened	
Japan	Japanese lightstick protests 27 February 2026 – present	Efforts to revise Article 9 of the Constitution of Japan by Sanae Takaichi; 2025–2026 China–Japan diplomatic crisis; Escalation of the Raging Reiwa Movement led by Gen Z protesters; Anti-monarchism	Ongoing	
Portugal	Portuguese housing protests March 2026 – present	Affordable housing and cost-of-living crisis; Property speculation; Landlord harassment and forced evictions; Police brutality	Ongoing	
Chile	2026 Chilean protests 3 June 2026 – present	Opposition to president José Antonio Kast; Cuts to education and austerity measures; Police brutality and unpopular security measures	Ongoing	
India	Cockroach Revolution: 2026 Delhi Jantar Mantar protests 6 June – 25 July 2026; 2026 anti-CEC protests 25 September 2026 – present	2026 NEET controversy; 2026 CBSE On-Screen Marking controversy; Police brutality; 2026 Indian electoral controversy; Alleged manipulation of electoral rolls during SIR procedure; Possible corruption in the ECI	Ongoing: Resignation of Minister for Education Dharmendra Pradhan; Founding of Cockroach Janta Party	
Austria	2026 European unrest: Spanish housing protests; Irish fuel protests; Polish protests; French unrest; Italian unrest; 15 July 2026 – present	Fuel, debt and energy crisis; Austerity and degradation of education and public services; Property speculation, landlord harassment and housing crisis; High inflation and unemployment; Political corruption and censorship; Opposition to military rearmament and interventionism; Illiberalism and political crisis; Environmental and climate concerns; Declining standard of living and cost-of-living crisis; Economic stagnation and social inequality; Solidarity with Palestine; Police brutality	Ongoing: Mass riots and arrests (17 October riots); Response from the European Commission	
Belgium	2026 European unrest: Spanish housing protests; Irish fuel protests; Polish protests; French unrest; Italian unrest; 15 July 2026 – present	Fuel, debt and energy crisis; Austerity and degradation of education and public services; Property speculation, landlord harassment and housing crisis; High inflation and unemployment; Political corruption and censorship; Opposition to military rearmament and interventionism; Illiberalism and political crisis; Environmental and climate concerns; Declining standard of living and cost-of-living crisis; Economic stagnation and social inequality; Solidarity with Palestine; Police brutality	Ongoing: Mass riots and arrests (17 October riots); Response from the European Commission	
Bosnia	2026 European unrest: Spanish housing protests; Irish fuel protests; Polish protests; French unrest; Italian unrest; 15 July 2026 – present	Fuel, debt and energy crisis; Austerity and degradation of education and public services; Property speculation, landlord harassment and housing crisis; High inflation and unemployment; Political corruption and censorship; Opposition to military rearmament and interventionism; Illiberalism and political crisis; Environmental and climate concerns; Declining standard of living and cost-of-living crisis; Economic stagnation and social inequality; Solidarity with Palestine; Police brutality	Ongoing: Mass riots and arrests (17 October riots); Response from the European Commission	
Canada (Quebec)	2026 European unrest: Spanish housing protests; Irish fuel protests; Polish protests; French unrest; Italian unrest; 15 July 2026 – present	Fuel, debt and energy crisis; Austerity and degradation of education and public services; Property speculation, landlord harassment and housing crisis; High inflation and unemployment; Political corruption and censorship; Opposition to military rearmament and interventionism; Illiberalism and political crisis; Environmental and climate concerns; Declining standard of living and cost-of-living crisis; Economic stagnation and social inequality; Solidarity with Palestine; Police brutality	Ongoing: Mass riots and arrests (17 October riots); Response from the European Commission	
Croatia	2026 European unrest: Spanish housing protests; Irish fuel protests; Polish protests; French unrest; Italian unrest; 15 July 2026 – present	Fuel, debt and energy crisis; Austerity and degradation of education and public services; Property speculation, landlord harassment and housing crisis; High inflation and unemployment; Political corruption and censorship; Opposition to military rearmament and interventionism; Illiberalism and political crisis; Environmental and climate concerns; Declining standard of living and cost-of-living crisis; Economic stagnation and social inequality; Solidarity with Palestine; Police brutality	Ongoing: Mass riots and arrests (17 October riots); Response from the European Commission	
Czechia	2026 European unrest: Spanish housing protests; Irish fuel protests; Polish protests; French unrest; Italian unrest; 15 July 2026 – present	Fuel, debt and energy crisis; Austerity and degradation of education and public services; Property speculation, landlord harassment and housing crisis; High inflation and unemployment; Political corruption and censorship; Opposition to military rearmament and interventionism; Illiberalism and political crisis; Environmental and climate concerns; Declining standard of living and cost-of-living crisis; Economic stagnation and social inequality; Solidarity with Palestine; Police brutality	Ongoing: Mass riots and arrests (17 October riots); Response from the European Commission	
Denmark	2026 European unrest: Spanish housing protests; Irish fuel protests; Polish protests; French unrest; Italian unrest; 15 July 2026 – present	Fuel, debt and energy crisis; Austerity and degradation of education and public services; Property speculation, landlord harassment and housing crisis; High inflation and unemployment; Political corruption and censorship; Opposition to military rearmament and interventionism; Illiberalism and political crisis; Environmental and climate concerns; Declining standard of living and cost-of-living crisis; Economic stagnation and social inequality; Solidarity with Palestine; Police brutality	Ongoing: Mass riots and arrests (17 October riots); Response from the European Commission	
France	2026 European unrest: Spanish housing protests; Irish fuel protests; Polish protests; French unrest; Italian unrest; 15 July 2026 – present	Fuel, debt and energy crisis; Austerity and degradation of education and public services; Property speculation, landlord harassment and housing crisis; High inflation and unemployment; Political corruption and censorship; Opposition to military rearmament and interventionism; Illiberalism and political crisis; Environmental and climate concerns; Declining standard of living and cost-of-living crisis; Economic stagnation and social inequality; Solidarity with Palestine; Police brutality	Ongoing: Mass riots and arrests (17 October riots); Response from the European Commission	
Greece	2026 European unrest: Spanish housing protests; Irish fuel protests; Polish protests; French unrest; Italian unrest; 15 July 2026 – present	Fuel, debt and energy crisis; Austerity and degradation of education and public services; Property speculation, landlord harassment and housing crisis; High inflation and unemployment; Political corruption and censorship; Opposition to military rearmament and interventionism; Illiberalism and political crisis; Environmental and climate concerns; Declining standard of living and cost-of-living crisis; Economic stagnation and social inequality; Solidarity with Palestine; Police brutality	Ongoing: Mass riots and arrests (17 October riots); Response from the European Commission	
Ireland	2026 European unrest: Spanish housing protests; Irish fuel protests; Polish protests; French unrest; Italian unrest; 15 July 2026 – present	Fuel, debt and energy crisis; Austerity and degradation of education and public services; Property speculation, landlord harassment and housing crisis; High inflation and unemployment; Political corruption and censorship; Opposition to military rearmament and interventionism; Illiberalism and political crisis; Environmental and climate concerns; Declining standard of living and cost-of-living crisis; Economic stagnation and social inequality; Solidarity with Palestine; Police brutality	Ongoing: Mass riots and arrests (17 October riots); Response from the European Commission	
Italy	2026 European unrest: Spanish housing protests; Irish fuel protests; Polish protests; French unrest; Italian unrest; 15 July 2026 – present	Fuel, debt and energy crisis; Austerity and degradation of education and public services; Property speculation, landlord harassment and housing crisis; High inflation and unemployment; Political corruption and censorship; Opposition to military rearmament and interventionism; Illiberalism and political crisis; Environmental and climate concerns; Declining standard of living and cost-of-living crisis; Economic stagnation and social inequality; Solidarity with Palestine; Police brutality	Ongoing: Mass riots and arrests (17 October riots); Response from the European Commission	
Lithuania	2026 European unrest: Spanish housing protests; Irish fuel protests; Polish protests; French unrest; Italian unrest; 15 July 2026 – present	Fuel, debt and energy crisis; Austerity and degradation of education and public services; Property speculation, landlord harassment and housing crisis; High inflation and unemployment; Political corruption and censorship; Opposition to military rearmament and interventionism; Illiberalism and political crisis; Environmental and climate concerns; Declining standard of living and cost-of-living crisis; Economic stagnation and social inequality; Solidarity with Palestine; Police brutality	Ongoing: Mass riots and arrests (17 October riots); Response from the European Commission	
Luxembourg	2026 European unrest: Spanish housing protests; Irish fuel protests; Polish protests; French unrest; Italian unrest; 15 July 2026 – present	Fuel, debt and energy crisis; Austerity and degradation of education and public services; Property speculation, landlord harassment and housing crisis; High inflation and unemployment; Political corruption and censorship; Opposition to military rearmament and interventionism; Illiberalism and political crisis; Environmental and climate concerns; Declining standard of living and cost-of-living crisis; Economic stagnation and social inequality; Solidarity with Palestine; Police brutality	Ongoing: Mass riots and arrests (17 October riots); Response from the European Commission	
Netherlands	2026 European unrest: Spanish housing protests; Irish fuel protests; Polish protests; French unrest; Italian unrest; 15 July 2026 – present	Fuel, debt and energy crisis; Austerity and degradation of education and public services; Property speculation, landlord harassment and housing crisis; High inflation and unemployment; Political corruption and censorship; Opposition to military rearmament and interventionism; Illiberalism and political crisis; Environmental and climate concerns; Declining standard of living and cost-of-living crisis; Economic stagnation and social inequality; Solidarity with Palestine; Police brutality	Ongoing: Mass riots and arrests (17 October riots); Response from the European Commission	
Poland	2026 European unrest: Spanish housing protests; Irish fuel protests; Polish protests; French unrest; Italian unrest; 15 July 2026 – present	Fuel, debt and energy crisis; Austerity and degradation of education and public services; Property speculation, landlord harassment and housing crisis; High inflation and unemployment; Political corruption and censorship; Opposition to military rearmament and interventionism; Illiberalism and political crisis; Environmental and climate concerns; Declining standard of living and cost-of-living crisis; Economic stagnation and social inequality; Solidarity with Palestine; Police brutality	Ongoing: Mass riots and arrests (17 October riots); Response from the European Commission	
Spain	2026 European unrest: Spanish housing protests; Irish fuel protests; Polish protests; French unrest; Italian unrest; 15 July 2026 – present	Fuel, debt and energy crisis; Austerity and degradation of education and public services; Property speculation, landlord harassment and housing crisis; High inflation and unemployment; Political corruption and censorship; Opposition to military rearmament and interventionism; Illiberalism and political crisis; Environmental and climate concerns; Declining standard of living and cost-of-living crisis; Economic stagnation and social inequality; Solidarity with Palestine; Police brutality	Ongoing: Mass riots and arrests (17 October riots); Response from the European Commission	
Romania	2026 European unrest: Spanish housing protests; Irish fuel protests; Polish protests; French unrest; Italian unrest; 15 July 2026 – present	Fuel, debt and energy crisis; Austerity and degradation of education and public services; Property speculation, landlord harassment and housing crisis; High inflation and unemployment; Political corruption and censorship; Opposition to military rearmament and interventionism; Illiberalism and political crisis; Environmental and climate concerns; Declining standard of living and cost-of-living crisis; Economic stagnation and social inequality; Solidarity with Palestine; Police brutality	Ongoing: Mass riots and arrests (17 October riots); Response from the European Commission	
Sweden	2026 European unrest: Spanish housing protests; Irish fuel protests; Polish protests; French unrest; Italian unrest; 15 July 2026 – present	Fuel, debt and energy crisis; Austerity and degradation of education and public services; Property speculation, landlord harassment and housing crisis; High inflation and unemployment; Political corruption and censorship; Opposition to military rearmament and interventionism; Illiberalism and political crisis; Environmental and climate concerns; Declining standard of living and cost-of-living crisis; Economic stagnation and social inequality; Solidarity with Palestine; Police brutality	Ongoing: Mass riots and arrests (17 October riots); Response from the European Commission	
Switzerland	2026 European unrest: Spanish housing protests; Irish fuel protests; Polish protests; French unrest; Italian unrest; 15 July 2026 – present	Fuel, debt and energy crisis; Austerity and degradation of education and public services; Property speculation, landlord harassment and housing crisis; High inflation and unemployment; Political corruption and censorship; Opposition to military rearmament and interventionism; Illiberalism and political crisis; Environmental and climate concerns; Declining standard of living and cost-of-living crisis; Economic stagnation and social inequality; Solidarity with Palestine; Police brutality	Ongoing: Mass riots and arrests (17 October riots); Response from the European Commission	
United Kingdom	2026 European unrest: Spanish housing protests; Irish fuel protests; Polish protests; French unrest; Italian unrest; 15 July 2026 – present	Fuel, debt and energy crisis; Austerity and degradation of education and public services; Property speculation, landlord harassment and housing crisis; High inflation and unemployment; Political corruption and censorship; Opposition to military rearmament and interventionism; Illiberalism and political crisis; Environmental and climate concerns; Declining standard of living and cost-of-living crisis; Economic stagnation and social inequality; Solidarity with Palestine; Police brutality	Ongoing: Mass riots and arrests (17 October riots); Response from the European Commission	
Argentina	2026 Argentinian protests 15 October 2026 – present	Refusal of Milei government to release funding for universities; Cuts to education and austerity measures; Police brutality and unpopular security measures	Ongoing	

== See also ==
- List of protests in the 21st century
- Gerontocracy
- Revolutions of 1917–1923
- Revolutions of 1989
- Third wave of autocratization
