= 2025 Paraguayan protests =

2025 Gen Z protests

- Part of the Gen Z protests and Paraguay security crisis
- Date: September 28, 2025 – October 3, 2025
- Location: Paraguay
- Goals: Removal of President Santiago Peña; End to corruption; Reversal of the relocation of the Instituto Paraguayo del Indígena (INDI); Removal of Juan Ramón Benegas from his position as head of the INDI
- Status: Protester victory: President retains position; INDI relocation reversed; Juan Ramón Benegas removed as INDI head

Parties
Generación Z Paraguay; Indigenous peoples in Paraguay; PLRA	Government of Paraguay; National Police of Paraguay; ANR-PC

Lead figures
No centralised leadership	(Paraguay) Santiago Peña; Horacio Cartes (Paraguay) Enrique Riera; Carlos Benítez

Casualties
- Arrested: 31+
- Damage: public streets damaged

On 28 September 2025, protests began in Paraguay against the administration of President Santiago Peña, first staged by a group known as Generación Z Paraguay. Commonly described by the media as part of the Gen Z protests, they are the first mass-scale protests in the country since 2021, with the protests being inspired by the 2025 Peruvian protests. The indigenous peoples in Paraguay joined the protest after the office of the Instituto Paraguayo del Indígena (INDI) was moved to a military base, also demanding the removal of the head of the INDI, Juan Ramón Benegas. The protests ended on October 3, 2025, after the government accepted the demands of the protesters.
