= 2026 Ugandan protests =

Public demonstrations following election fraud

- Part of the Gen Z protests
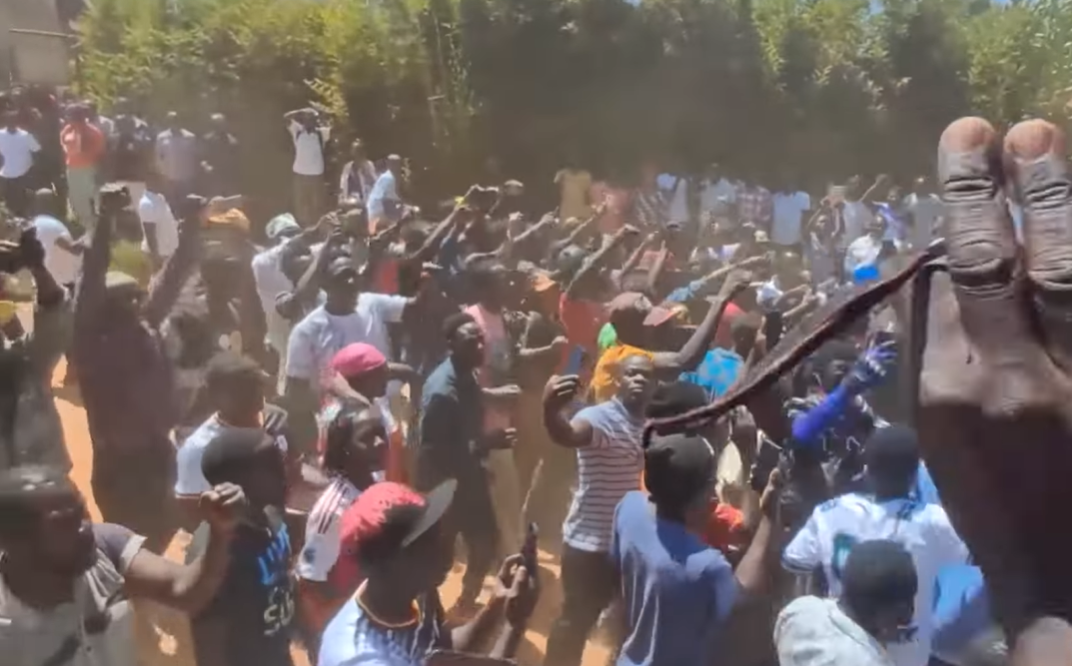
- An image of the protests that took place on 16 January 2026 in Uganda uploaded by Capital FM Kenya
- Date: 16 January 2026 – 20 January 2026
- Location: Butambala, Kampala
- Caused by: Authoritarianism; Political corruption; Alleged electoral fraud in the 2026 Ugandan general election; Attempted arrest of Bobi Wine
- Goals: Resignation of Yoweri Museveni; Democratisation; Regime change
- Result: Protests suppressed: Opposition leader Bobi Wine flees country; Yoweri Museveni remains in power

Parties
(Uganda) Ugandan opposition: National Unity Platform	Government of Uganda; President of Uganda; Uganda Police Force; Uganda People's Defence Force; Ugandan Special Forces Command; National Resistance Movement

Lead figures
Bobi Wine	Yoweri Museveni; Muhoozi Kainerugaba

Casualties and losses
30 protesters killed 2000+ protesters arrested	None

On 16 January 2026, protests and clashes began in Uganda in response to the 2026 Ugandan general election. Seven protesters were killed in the initial clashes.

== Background ==
Uganda's president Yoweri Museveni and his National Resistance Movement (NRM) first came to power in the aftermath of the Ugandan Bush War in 1986. Museveni planned to groom his son, army chief Muhoozi Kainerugaba, to succeed him but ultimately chose to stand in the 2026 election himself due to opposition within the NRM over making the office of president hereditary. Museveni faced a concerted opposition movement led by Bobi Wine and his National Unity Platform (NUP).

During the election, Wine had tapped into the youth's discontent, himself being 43 while Museveni is 81. Uganda has the second-youngest population in the world, with over 70% of Uganda's 46 million people under the age of 30 while under-30s also face a 43% unemployment rate. This was the first election in Uganda where most members of Generation Z could vote.

Museveni and the NRM took authoritarian steps to stifle the NUP, harassing its candidates and even sending the Ugandan army to a rally held by Wine, killing at least one and arresting hundreds of his supporters. Israeli firm Cellebrite provided Museveni's government with phone hacking tools to listen in on the opposition, while the government also formed ad-hoc militias to shadow NUP politicians with these militias frequently roaming working-class neighborhoods to attack or otherwise threaten NUP supporters. The election had become so militarized that Wine resorted to campaigning in a bulletproof vest and helmet.

Wine's campaign included several major pro-youth platforms while Museveni derided the youth, stating in a televised address: "You Gen Z, what have you done so far? When I was 26, we started the FRONASA movement to liberate this country. But for you Gen Z, all I hear is 'vibe, vibe.' What is your vibe doing for the country?" International election observers were barred from entering the country while Wine warned that if Museveni attempted to rig the election that there would be mass protests.

The government issued an internet blackout across the country on election day while Wine posted on online social media that Museveni and the NRM were engaging in a massive ballot stuffing campaign as Uganda's central election authority, whose members are hand-picked by Museveni, announced that Museveni had won the election with 74% of the vote late in the evening.

== Protests ==
=== 16 January ===
At about 3:00 am, violence broke out in Butambala District about 35 miles (60 km) outside Kampala where police spokeswoman Lydia Tumushabe called protesters "machete-wielding opposition goons". Tumushabe stated that the protesters attempted to storm the police station where votes were being 'verified', resulting in the police using live ammunition to disperse the crowd, killing several in "self defense". Local NUP MP Muwanga Kivumbi, however, offered a conflicting report, stating that the police had raided his personal home near the police station, where he and local NUP members were holding an election watch party, killing 10 and arresting 25 in a "massacre".

Shortly after security forces broke into Wine's house, assaulted his private security, and abducted him in a Ugandan army helicopter with the NUP issuing a statement that the government was holding him under house arrest. Later in the morning protesters took to the streets of Kampala as police fired tear gas at the crowds.

Military checkpoints were erected around Kampala with thousands of heavily armed police and army personnel being sent to the capital who have been targeting journalists as the government attempts to more stringently enforce its internet blackout with social media, WhatsApp, and email being blocked. The government also issued a statement that "police have deployed outside [Wine's] home and restricted his movements" for his own "protection" from the rioters. In Kololo, opposition lawmakers were beaten at polling places, with at least 300 NUP members being arrested.

=== 17 January ===
A massive crowd, complete with tents to stay overnight, sprung up around Wine's residence in the Magere district of Kampala. Wine released a statement that the police had raided his home, but that he was able to escape in the confusion, as the police had cut power to his building, allowing him to climb over the perimeter fence in the dark of night and that he is currently safe in an undisclosed location. However, his wife and children are under house arrest at his residence while the police said Wine was lying and he was currently under house arrest, something they were not able to provide any evidence for.

Wine also called on the Ugandan people to "reject whatever is being declared by Byabakama" that the "results are fake" and "do not in any way reflect what is on the declaration forms" and that "We want to call upon the people of Uganda to reject these fake results." He called for a restoration of the internet in the country, and for the vote tally sheets to be released so the results could be verified by the public. The Ugandan police meanwhile urged citizens to stay at home and that it is "only lawbreakers who need to think twice or worry." In response to the protests, social media was blocked in Uganda at 23:00 local time by authorities.

=== 18 January ===
Airtel Uganda restored the internet for businesses that use the internet, but the Uganda Communications Commission had ordered social media to remain blocked. Museveni meanwhile gave his victory speech, in which he called the opposition "terrorists" and that "they are working with some foreigners and some homosexual groups." Meanwhile the security presence around the capital was lessened while the African Union reported that "reports of intimidation, arrest and abductions" had "instilled fear and eroded public trust in the electoral process." Wine, meanwhile, called on his supporters to protest the "fake" results.

=== 19 January ===
The NUP led members of the Ugandan diaspora in South Africa in protest outside of the Ugandan High Commission in Pretoria against Museveni and for rejecting the election results. That same day 118 members of the party were arrested across Uganda for "unlawful assembly" and "unlawful possession of election materials." The NUP's secretary general David Rubongoya stated that most of those arrested were NUP poll workers and election watchers, and that many of them were beaten unnecessarily during their arrests.

=== 20 January ===
Wine gave an interview to the BBC stating that while he has absolutely no faith in the nation's judiciary, being rife with Museveni appointments, that he will still follow protocol and legally challenge the election results in court. In the interview he also stated that he initially allowed himself to be arrested and placed under house arrest, but escaped on Friday night when he learned that the officers were planning on attacking him as he slept and has been in hiding.

Wine also gave an interview to Al Jazeera where he stated he has video evidence of election officials checking off Museveni's name on blank surplus ballots and stuffing them into the ballot boxes, that 7 NUP election workers were kidnapped in broad daylight during the election, some of whom are still missing, and that the internet blackout was put in place so those videos couldn't circulate. After the interview aired the Ugandan police finally admitted that they did not have Wine in custody.

In response to Wine's BBC interview, Muhoozi Kainerugaba, Museveni's son and likely successor, boasted on social media that since the election the military has "killed 22 NUP terrorists" and that "I'm praying the 23rd is Kabobi (a nickname of Wine)." The posts, and ones made earlier in the election where Muhoozi threatened to behead Wine, were well-received by some NRM voters, with one supporter stating when shown the posts "He is my next president. He is a good man. I love him so much," while being interviewed at a pro-Museveni rally in Kampala.

=== 23 January ===
Kainerugaba issued a statement that the death toll for "NUP terrorists" had increased to 30 and that more than 2000 supporters of the opposition had been arrested. Among the arrested includes Muwanga Kivumbi, a member of Uganda's parliament, as most of the NUP's leadership had been reported as missing.

=== 26 January ===
Exiled Ugandan Supreme Court Justice Esther Kisaakye issued a statement condemning the mass killing, abductions, and raids targeting the NUP as well as the government labeling the democratic opposition as "terrorists" arguing that Museveni was undermining the constitution. This came shortly after the military gave Wine a 24 hour deadline to turn himself in or face being shot on sight which he did not do.

== Aftermath ==
By February the protest had been sufficiently crushed, with remaining opposition figures targeted in raids and accused of high treason. The manhunt for Wine was ultimately unsuccessful. By 15 March he gave another interview with the BBC stating that he was sheltered by supporters, going house to house surviving off their charity and evading numerous attempts to kill him before ultimately fleeing the country. Wine stated that he left the NUP in the hands of his deputy, Lina Zedriga, who remained in the country.

== See also ==
- 2024–2025 Mozambican protests
- 2025 Cameroonian protests
- 2025 Malagasy protests
- 2025 Moroccan Gen Z protests
- 2025 Tanzanian election protests
- 2025 Togolese Gen Z protests
- Kenya Finance Bill protests
