= Simon Sirro =

Tanzanian diplomat and civil servant

10th Inspector General of Police (IGP)
- In office May 29, 2017 – July 19, 2022
- President: Samia Suluhu (2021–2022); John Magufuli (2017–2021)
- Preceded by: Ernest Mangu
- Succeeded by: Camillus Wambura

United Republic of Tanzania Ambassador to Zimbabwe
- Incumbent
- Assumed office 19 July 2022
- President: Samia Suluhu
- Preceded by: Prof. Emmanuel D. Mbennah

Personal details
- Born: Simon Nyakoro Sirro; 1963 (age 62–63) Butiama, Mara Region
- Education: Iliboru Secondary School; Tosamaganga Secondary School
- Occupation: Police officer Diplomat
- Police career
- Allegiance: Tanzania
- Branch: Tanzania National Police
- Service years: 2017 – 2022
- Status: Retired
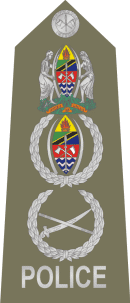
- Rank: Inspector General of Police

Simon Nyakoro Sirro (born in 1963) is a Tanzanian diplomat and former Inspector-general of police force in Tanzania. In 2022, he was appointed to be an ambassador of Tanzania to Zimbabwe by President Samia Suluhu Hassan.
