= Lightstick protests =

Peaceful protest phenomenon in East Asia

- Part of 2024 South Korean martial law crisis, Winter Bluebird Movement (Taiwan), Protests against the 2026 Iran war, and Gen Z protests in Asia
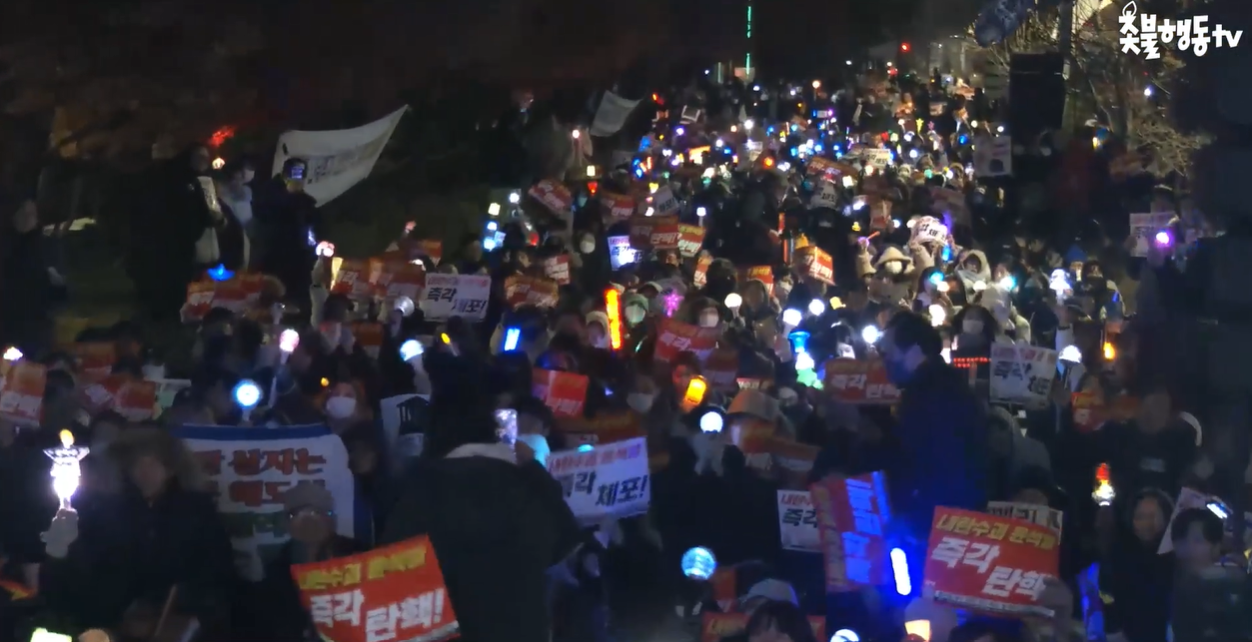
- An example of lightstick protests in South Korea
- Date: South Korea; 3 December 2024 – 4 April 2026; Taiwan c. 18 December 2024 – 23 August 2025; Japan; 27 February 2026 – Ongoing (8 months and 26 days)
- Location: East Asia: South Korea; Taiwan; Japan
- Caused by: Declaration of martial law by President Yoon Suk Yeol; Declaration of the Three Big Bills in Taiwan; Opposition to Sanae Takaichi; Efforts to revise Article 9 of the Constitution of Japan; 2026 Iran war; 2026 amendment of the Imperial Household Law
- Result: Success in South Korea; Coup d'état attempt by Yoon Suk Yeol failed; Impeachment of Yoon Suk Yeol; Failed in Taiwan; Three Big Bills are delayed, but passed regardlessly after third hearing; 2025 Taiwanese mass electoral recall campaigns; Ongoing (in Japan)

Parties
Grassroots movements in South Korea Grassroots movements in Taiwan; Democratic Progressive Party: Grassroots movements in Japan; WE WANT OUR FUTURE; Kinki Penlight Group; Political parties in Japan; Japanese Communist Party	Yoon administration: Ministry of National Defense (MND); Republic of Korea Army; Capital Defense Command; Defense Counterintelligence Command; Defense Intelligence Agency; Ministry of the Interior and Safety; National Police Agency; Seoul Metropolitan Police Agency; Government of Taiwan; Kuomintang; Taiwan People's Party; Government of Japan; Liberal Democratic Party

The lightstick protests, alternatively known as penlight demonstrations (Note: Korean: 응원봉 시위; RR: eungwonbong siwi; Japanese: ペンライトデモ, romanized: Penraitodemo; Chinese: 應援棒示威; pinyin: yìngyuánbàng shìwēi) is a form of nonviolent protest in East Asia characterised by the synchronised use of electronic concert lightsticks. The movement originated in South Korea in December 2024 during mass demonstrations against emergency martial law, where youth substituted traditional wax candles with colourful K-pop lightsticks. The tactic subsequently spread to Japan and Taiwan, where it has been adopted by Generation Z activists to oppose government policies, advocate for peace, and protest constitutional reforms. By integrating idol fandom culture into political dissent, the movement aims to lower the barrier to civic engagement and destigmatise public protests. The protests were defined as a direct evolution of candlelight rallies, sometimes called Candlelight Protest 2.0, and as Gen Z protests.

== History ==
=== Background ===
==== South Korea ====
The use of luminous objects in East Asian civic activism draws heavily upon a long-standing tradition of candlelight vigils and mass nocturnal assemblies. The primary structural precursor is South Korea's "candlelight rally" (chotbul jibhoe) culture. Starting on 26 September 1992 when online users gathered to oppose the charging of the online service Kotel, which had stopped being free of charge when "Korea PC Telecom" acquired the company, South Korea's candlelight rallies culture intensified following 2002, when internet cafes organised a significant protest in Gwanghwamun Square to condemn the killing of two Korean girls by US armoured vehicles on military training manoeuvres.

Since then, mass candle-lit assemblies became a signature of South Korean civil resistance, culminating in the historic 2016–2017 "Candlelight Revolution". The revolution, which millions took a part in, led to the impeachment of President Park Geun-hye. During these protests, lightsticks started to first appear as a sign of protest in response to Kim Jin-tae's statement that "candlelights will eventually go out when the wind blows", alongside apps which showcased images of candlelights.

Following the 2016–2017 events, candlelight vigils remained the primary baseline for South Korean public assemblies, with their usage being prominent in rallies such as one held in 2019, where participants advocated for a reform of the prosecution system in defence of then-Minister of Justice, Cho Kuk, and his family.

==== Taiwan ====
The basis of lightstick protests in Taiwan stem from the Bluebird Movement. In the initial May 2024 rallies outside the Legislative Yuan in Taipei, lightsticks were not yet widely used in protests. However, after K-pop and Mandopop fandoms established the exact organisational framework that would later go on to define these lightstick protests, their usage grew as many more individuals across the nation used them in protests. Taiwanese fans have used internet spaces to translate political news, design custom protest fan art, and, in a move borrowed directly from K-pop agency protest culture, crowdfunded an LED truck within a few hours to park near the parliament, broadcasting pro-democracy messages and synchronised videos.

=== Original protest ===
A structural and cultural shift occurred during the 2024 South Korean martial law crisis. On 3 December 2024, President Yoon Suk-yeol suddenly declared emergency martial law, triggering immediate mass mobilisation outside the National Assembly in Seoul. Using rapid social media coordination, some of these daily demonstrations saw a widespread substitution of traditional wax candles with official K-pop electronic lightsticks (eungwonbong) from groups such as SHINee, NCT, Highlight, NewJeans, WOODZ, BTS, GFriend, Blackpink, Stray Kids and Seventeen. The protests were described as being similar to a concert, with songs such as "March for the Beloved", "In the Wilderness", "Into the New World," Aespa's "Whiplash," Rosé's "APT," Seventeen's BooSeokSoon's "Go Ahead," and G-Dragon's "Crooked" playing in the background. When asked about why they had brought lightsticks to the protests instead of candles, some protesters cited Kim Jin-tae's statement from back in 2016, stating that "lightsticks shine for 24 hours". Social media and the wider internet were used as a way to show solidarity to the protests; some online sellers of lightsticks lent their items temporarily free of charge, whilst other users prepaid coffees and gimbaps for the demonstrators to claim.

Despite being the main symbol, lightsticks were not the only items brought to these protests. Flags featuring slogans and sarcastic remarks such as "National Quokka Conservation Association," "Star Wars Resistance Seoul Branch," "Single-Person Household Planetary Alliance," and "Dog Foot Odor Research Society" also made an appearance. Another popular item was the glowstick, a cheaper alternative to the fandom-tied lightsticks.

On 9 December 2024, as a callback to the original lightstick protest, and in respect towards those who participated in it, Jung Chung-rae recited the lyrics of "Into the New World" in the parliamentary judiciary committee.

=== Subsequent protests ===
==== South Korea ====
On 2 January 2026, mass nightly rallies organised in Gwanghwamun Plaza and central Seoul heavily deployed fandom "eungwonbong" alongside traditional placards. Such protests continued into the rest of January 2026, accompanying the impeachment procedure of Yoon Suk-Yeol.

==== Taiwan ====
The tactical transition to a true "lightstick protest" (yìngyuánbàng shìwēi) in Taiwan materialised between 18 and 20 December 2024. Rallies occurred concurrently with the massive post-martial law demonstrations in Seoul, South Korea. Viral video documentation of South Korean youth deploying battery-operated eungwonbong directly inspired Taiwanese K-pop fans to systematically replicate the tactic. Over 15,000 demonstrators flooded rallies in Taipei, carrying the official concert lightsticks of diverse idol groups, including Super Junior, SEVENTEEN, TVXQ, Infinite, NCT, and Miss A. The movement popularised the slogan "My Bias is Taiwan" (我的本命是台灣, Wǒ de běnmìng shì Táiwān), substituting a traditional political party identity with the subcultural concept of a "bias" or běnmìng (one's absolute favourite or ultimate idol).

The visible presence of concert merchandise drew sharp condemnation from opposition lawmakers. Politicians from the Kuomintang party publicly dismissed the youth protesters as "crazy star-chasers" and accused them of being paid operatives of the ruling Democratic Progressive Party (DPP) to buy expensive merchandise. Following these claims, protesters updated the digital display on their crowdfunded LED truck to read explicitly: "I bought my own lightsticks" and "Democracy must be upheld so that star-chasing can be an everyday practice." Protesters argued that democratic structures were guaranteed the fundamental civil liberty to consume global pop culture freely without state censorship.

The Economic Democracy Union (經民連) and the Taiwan Citizen Front (台灣公民陣線) institutionalised the momentum of the late 2024 protests by launching a long-term, decentralised circuit of regional assemblies known as the Accountability Rallies for Abusive Legislators (L濫權立委究責會). On 2 January 2025, a mass assembly in Banqiao drew over 700 participants. The fan-crowdfunded "Star-Chasing Truck" returned to the venue, projecting synchronised digital slogans via its LED displays while attendees rhythmically waved electronic lightsticks. On 8 January 2025, the rolling lightstick rallies expanded to Taichung, on 15 January in Miaoli, on 19 January in Hualien and continued dynamically into the spring.

The massive reliance on foreign K-pop "eungwonbong" prompted a coalition of Taiwanese youth designers and fan organisers to launch an independent crowdfunding initiative in early 2025 known as the Taiwan Lightstick Project, also known as Democratic Lightstick. However, the rapid influx of capital and the sheer scale of manufacturing led to significant internal friction. By February 2025, production delays, product labeling anomalies, and invoice distribution issues caused a wave of consumer frustration, prompting some purchasers to organise a formal "Consumer Self-Help Association" to demand financial audits.

==== Japan ====
External videos
- Kyodo News report on the 8 April protest

The first lightstick protest in Japan occurred on 27 February 2026, when 3,600 individuals showed up in front of the nation's National Diet Building. This was followed by another such protest, which took place on 10 March, this time with an attendance of 8,600 people, and another on 25 March, where 24,000 individuals participated.

The protests started to intensify and enlarge starting on 8 April, on Hanamatsuri, as well as 19 April 2026. Both protests took place in front of the National Diet Building to protest the plan of revisiting Article 9 of the Japanese constitution, playing Aespa's song "Whiplash", with a significant presence of lightsticks. Approximately 30,000 people attended the former protest, where participants also engaged in oshikatsu, which was adapted as a form of political protest against the National Diet.

On Constitution Memorial Day, at the Rinkai Disaster Prevention Park in Tokyo, 50,000 people took part in a protest against Sanae Takaichi and her government. Participants of the protest chanted slogans calling for Takaichi's resignation and the protection of the constitution, playing a song from the K-pop girl group Kara, titled "Mister". The protest saw the utilisation of lightsticks as symbols, inspired by the protests that took place in South Korea.

After the massive central gathering in Tokyo on 3 May, the movement decentralised. Activists used localised online platforms such as the Demo Calendar to organise regional, neighbourhood-level events. Instead of traveling to the National Diet Building, citizens brought their concert lightsticks to local train stations. One such instance of a lightstick rally in a train station was a 250-person rally at Kamata Station, which was held on 1 June. Widespread "Lightsticks & Reading Nights" also occurred in prefectures such as Miyazaki and Fukuoka. These decentralised actions frequently adopted the slogan "Lightsticks Over Swords" (剣よりペンライト). On 27 June 2026, a lightstick protest occurred in Kiryu, with most of the participants being elderly individuals. On 29 May, the "Light of Protest" rally outside the National Diet Building managed to draw thousands of participants who used the approachable "lightstick culture" to lower the entry barrier for first-time protesters. The rally also saw the usage of “white bouquets”, intended to symbolise peace.

On 10 July, a nationwide demonstration that took place in 153 different locations named "We protest against outrageous politics" took place, drawing 35,175 people across Tokyo, Kyoto, Nagoya, Osaka, Sapporo and other cities; During the event, a lightstick protest also took place, which drew around 60 people in the Kintetsu Yamato-Saidaiji Station, Yamatokōriyama, the hometown of Takaichi. Around 27,000 of the individuals involved in the protests attended it in Tokyo at the National Diet building, however an additional 110,000 other individuals from across the country participated online. On 25 July, another lightstick protest was held, this time against the revised Imperial Household Law. The protest was called "Act in front of the Diet: Protest against chaotic politics", and was attended by an estimated 1,000 individuals. On the same day, LaSalle Ishii, Secretary-General of the Japanese Social Democratic Party, called the lightstick protests in Japan a "good sign".

On 19 August 2026, a penlight protest as part of the monthly “19th day of action protests” took place near the National Diet with anti-war and anti-establishment slogans such as “no to war” and “Takaichi must resign”.

On 20 September 2026, go2senkyo reported that daily lightstick protests were taking place in Hamamatsu Station, Hamamatsu as a part of a wider anti-war demonstrations. On 27 August 2026, it was reported that daily demonstrations have reached the 4,000th day.

On the evening of 19 October 2026, penlight protests were held in Tokyo's national diet building as the “19th day of action protests“, with nearly 12,000 protesters attending the demonstrations. Slogans used during the protests include “Stop blindly following the United States” and “Takaichi must step down immediately.”, as a response to the Japan-US joint military exercises and plans for military buildup. In Okinawa prefecture, similar demonstrations were happening against Article 15 of the constitution. Across Japan, 321 places reported solidarity demonstrations.

On the evening of 21 October 2026, anti-war penlight demonstrations were held outside of the National Diet building in Tokyo, Japan.

On 28 October 2026, penlight demonstrations were held in Tokyo following opposition to a bill that reduces Houses of Representatives seats.

Demonstrations were held on Friday, 30 October 2026, organised by the protester group ‘WE WANT OUR FUTURE’, in front of the National Diet building, with 9,000 people according to the organisers attended the protests and 22,000 watching the broadcasts of the demonstrations online. Many participants chanted with music and took turn giving speeches. Participants ranged from people in their 20s to people in their 40s.

On 19 November, penlight and anti-constitution protests took place in the National Diet building, as part of a reoccurring "19th Day of action" protests.

== Demographics ==
In South Korea, demographics analysis of the initial lightsticks protests identified people who were mostly in their 20s, part of what was defined as the MZ generation (Millennials and Generation Z). Older generations also participated during the protests but were unfamiliar with K-pop fandoms and the meaning of individual lightsticks; This led to the exchanges between the two demographic groups, where younger people taught older generations about their fandom and the symbolism of the lightsticks, whilst the older generation taught the younger ones specific "traditional" Korean protests chant which were used in the past. Over time, the protests in South Korea became Gen Z–led as their participation gradually increased from the December 2024 protests onwards. Despite being 12% of the South Korean population at the time, women aged 20 to 40 composed one third of the overall anti-Yoon rallies (which into itself included the lightstick protests).

Fount Media, a local newspaper, reported the presence of young people in the protests that took place in Taiwan, adding that it was the same "generation" as the one that had recently rose up in the same way in South Korea.

The lightstick protests in Japan featured members of the MZ generation, but were defined as Gen Z–led and as Gen Z protests. The average participant was in their 20s. These protests were also participated by individuals who identified themselves as "otakus".

== In popular culture ==
Following the protests, lightsticks have become an established symbol of democracy.

In December 2024, K-pop artists including NewJeans and IU expressed solidarity with lightstick protests and, by extension, with anti-Yoon protests as well. Filmmaker Park Chan-wook also showed support.

In March 2026, manga artist Naoki Yamamoto participated in the protests. On 1 June 2026, Sakaomi Yuzaki, the creator of the manga "She Loves to Cook, and She Loves to Eat", posted an artistic depiction of her characters participating in a lightstick protest, alongside the hashtags #NoWar and #PrideMonth. Japanese musician Shuta Hasunuma composed the song called "Streetlight", directly inspired by the Japanese lightstick protests.

Japanese singer and songwriter Babakaoruko addressed crowds during protests on 19 October, raising a lightstick in one of her hands in support of the protests.

== Aftermath ==
The lightstick protests in South Korea, like the rest of the anti-Yoon protests, reached their goal on 4 April 2025, when the Constitutional Court officially upheld the impeachment, stripping Yoon Suk Yeol of his presidency permanently. A snap presidential election was triggered immediately after. The progressive opposition won, shifting South Korea's domestic and foreign policy direction away from Yoon's conservative platform, but keeping some of its characteristics.

In Taiwan, it instead contributed to a structural deadlock between the presidency and parliament on the terms of the "three major bills".
