= 2025 Maldivian protests =

- Part of the Political unrest in the Maldives and Gen-Z protests in Asia
- Date: 20 September 2025 – 18 November 2025 (1 month and 29 days)
- Location: Malé
- Caused by: Maldives Media and Broadcasting Regulation Bill of 2025, restriction of local governmental authority, corruption
- Goals: Repeal of the "Maldives Media and Broadcasting Regulation Bill"; Restore authority of local government councils; Resignation of President Mohamed Muizzu
- Methods: Protests
- Result: Failed: Maldives Media and Broadcasting Regulation Bill ratified into law; Arrested protesters granted amnesty

Parties
(Maldives) Opposition: Maldivian Democratic Party; Bar Council of the Maldives; Committee to Protect Journalists	Government of the Maldives; Presidency of the Maldives; People's Majlis; People's National Congress; Maldives Police Service

Lead figures
Ibrahim Mohamed Solih	Mohamed Muizzu; Abdulla Khaleel

Casualties
- Arrested: 8

The 2025 Maldivian protests were protests in the Maldives from September until November against perceived government corruption and democratic backsliding as part of the wider Gen Z protests.

== Background ==
The People's National Congress, which came to power in the 2023 and 2024 elections holds basically unchecked power in the Maldives with 79 of the country's 93 seats in its People's Majlis as well as the presidency, and are thus allowed to pass any bill they please, with no opposition.

New laws had been passed issuing restrictions on the powers and authority of the local governments of the Maldives, the island councils, as well as the "Maldives Media and Broadcasting Regulation Bill" which enabled fines, suspension, or cancellation of media licenses at the discretion of the state. Additionally, the media bill would have created a single, overarching state-run media regulator, that also had jurisdiction over what journalists posted online. This regulator would have the authority to do everything except shut a media firm down, such as levying fines and suspending outlets that posted stories contrary to "religious norms, national security or public order." Minister of Foreign Affairs Abdulla Khaleel stated that the goal of the bill was to establish "clear standards and a code of conduct" and to "address the challenges of misinformation, disinformation and coordinated manipulation of content."

The Media law saw significant backlash from local media with journalists calling it a "muzzle" that seeks to end the freedom of speech in the country.

== Events ==
Protests against the media bill began the day it passed, 21 September 2025, with both the main union of journalists, and opposition party, the Maldivian Democratic Party (MDP) coordinating protests. Former President Ibrahim Mohamed Solih called the media bill the "end of press freedom" and urged his supporters to take to the streets to protest. They would be joined by the Bar Council of the Maldives, which administers the country's bar exams and the governing body for lawyers. By early October the MDP revived and broadened protests, this time centered around alleged widespread graft, rising prices, as well as the media law, with the chant "Lootuvaifi" ("Stop the Loot!") becoming their rallying cry. These protests saw clashes with the police in the capital with police using pepper spray and Long-Range Acoustic Devices to disperse the protesters.

On 3 October 2025 the Maldivian police arrested eight protesters for protesting in unauthorized spaces and deviating from the agreed route of the protests, as well as for throwing bricks and stones at the police. The police response was disproportionate. The MDP also called for the government of President Mohamed Muizzu to resign. MDP National Assembly vice-president Mohamed Raslan suffered a heart attack at the protest.

On October 4 the government issued a statement reaffirming their "commitment to upholding democratic rights, including the right to freedom of peaceful assembly" but that the protesters the night before had "defied the[ir] designated route and forced their way into Majeedhee Magu, - the busiest street in the Capital Male" forcing the police reaction. The Maldives Independent interviewed protesters on October 5, many of whom cited the general economic downturn, cost of living, as well as perceived corruption as to why they were protesting. The media bill would be passed in late October and signed into law.

The events of October 3 would be the only concerted mass protests in opposition to the bill. The MDP held another rally on November 1 but this time centering around rent prices. Shortly after the MDP announced they were planning another, "larger" “Lootuvaifi, Lootuvaifi” rally scheduled for November 17, however, ultimately cancelled due to failing to secure a venue. The following day the Prosecutor General’s Office announced a decision to not prosecute any of those arrested during the protests, essentially offering a general amnesty which the MDP voiced support for.

== Reactions ==
- United States: The day the bill passed the United States Embassy in Malé issued a statement condemning the bill, and calling on the government to “uphold the freedoms of expression, including dissenting and opposition voices.”
- United Kingdom: During the protests the British Government issued a travel warning to potential tourists to the Maldives, stating "Terrorist attacks in Maldives cannot be ruled out" and for British nationals to "Avoid any protests or rallies to ensure your safety and security."
