= Ernest Mangu =

Tanzanian diplomat and inspector general (born 1959)

9th Inspector General of the Tanzanian Police Force
- In office 31 December 2013 – 28 May 2017
- Deputy: Abdulrahman Kaniki
- Preceded by: Said Mwema
- Succeeded by: Simon Sirro

United Republic of Tanzania Ambassador to Rwanda
- In office 2018–2021
- President: Samia Suluhu
- Preceded by: Ali Iddi Siwa
- Succeeded by: Mej. Gen. Richard Mutayoba Makanzo

Personal details
- Born: Ernest Jumbe Mangu; 1959 (age 66–67) Singida Region, Tanganyika
- Spouse: Martha Mangu
- Children: Erick Mangu, Justice Mangu, Balima Mangu and Jullieth Mangu.
- Police career
- Allegiance: Tanzania
- Branch: Tanzania National Police
- Service years: 2013 – 2017
- Status: Retired
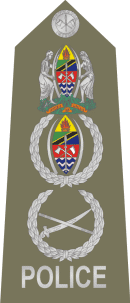
- Rank: Inspector General of Police

Ernest Jumbe Mangu is a Tanzanian diplomat and former Inspector General of Police of Tanzania. Before his appointment Mangu served as the Director of Criminal Intelligence in the Police Force. He also served as High Commissioner of the United Republic of Tanzania in Kigali, Rwanda.

== Early life and education ==
Mangu was born in 1959 and raised at Ikhanuda village in Singida Region of central Tanzania to a Nyatutu family.

He joined the Tanzania Police Academy in Moshi on 17 August 1982 for basic police training and completed in June 1983. In 1987, he joined the University of Dar es Salaam pursuing law at a certificate level. Later, he was admitted for a bachelor's degree programme and graduated in November 1992 and conferred with LLB. In June 2010, Mangu was awarded master's degree in Security Affairs by National Defense University after completing his studies.
