= 2025 Tanzanian election protests =

2025 Tanzanian post-election protests
- Part of the 2025 Tanzanian general election and the Gen Z protests
- Date: 29 October 2025 – 7 November 2025 (1 week and 2 days)
- Location: Tanzania; spillover into Kenya (Namanga border)
- Caused by: Allegations of electoral irregularities and lack of transparency in the 2025 general election; Authoritarianism of president Samia Suluhu Hassan
- Goals: Resignation of the government
- Methods: Protests, demonstrations, road blockades
- Result: Protests suppressed: Samia Suluhu Hassan remains in power

Parties
| Protesters | Government of Tanzania: Chama Cha Mapinduzi; Tanzania Police Force; Tanzania People's Defence Force |

Lead figures
| No centralised leadership | Samia Suluhu Hassan; Kassim Majaliwa; Philip Mpango; Emmanuel Nchimbi; Hamad Masauni; Jacob John Mkunda |

Casualties
- Deaths: 3,000–10,000 (per Chadema opposition politicians); 10 (per UN); 500+ (per BBC); 3,000+ (per African rights groups)
- Arrested: Hundreds arrested across multiple regions

A series of demonstrations and civil unrest began in Tanzania on 29 October 2025 amid the country's 2025 general election. The protests erupted in Dar es Salaam and later spread to other cities, following allegations of electoral irregularities, suppression of opposition parties, and police intimidation. Security forces responded with gunfire, tear gas, and curfews, as well as targeted killings, prompting international concern and travel warnings from several foreign governments. The opposition party Chadema has claimed that between 1,000 and 2,000 people were killed in these protests, which if confirmed would be a far higher death toll than in any previous Tanzanian election.

== Background ==
Tanzania held general elections on 29 October 2025. Incumbent president Samia Suluhu Hassan sought a full term, while several opposition candidates were either barred or detained ahead of the vote. Human rights organisations and foreign observers had raised concerns about shrinking civic space, media restrictions, and alleged interference with the Independent National Electoral Commission. Mange Kimambi called for citizens to participate in opposition rallies.

== Timeline ==
=== 29 October ===
General elections were held in Tanzania. Protests erupted in Dar es Salaam as voters and opposition-supporters reacted to the barring of several opposition figures. Security forces were deployed and an internet blackout was reported.

A curfew was imposed in Dar es Salaam after clashes around polling stations, including burning tyres and reported attacks on a bus and a petrol station.

=== 30 October ===
Demonstrations continued in Dar es Salaam, Arusha and Mwanza. Security forces used tear gas and reportedly fired live ammunition to disperse crowds.

Roadblocks operated by the Tanzanian Army were deployed throughout the country turning away anyone if they could not prove they were an essential worker.

Unrest spilled into Kenya's Namanga border town as clashes near the frontier disrupted cross-border trade, with tear gas fired and shops closing.

=== 31 October ===
Opposition sources claimed around 700 people had been killed nationwide, while the Office of the United Nations High Commissioner for Human Rights reported at least 10 confirmed deaths and expressed concern over the use of live ammunition. John Kitoka, a spokesperson for the Chadema opposition party, told AFP that Chadema's numbers had been gathered by a network of party members going to hospitals and health clinics and "counting dead bodies". He demanded that the government "stop killing our protesters" and called for a transitional government to pave the way for free and fair elections.

=== 1 November ===
President Samia Suluhu Hassan was declared as the winner of the election by the Independent National Electoral Commission having won 98% of votes.

Emirates suspended its flights to and from Dar es Salaam due to the ongoing post-election unrest, stating that operations would remain halted while the situation was being monitored. In a security alert, the U.S. Embassy stated that a nationwide curfew from 6 pm to 6 am was in effect, that international flights were "intermittent," and that internet access continued to be blocked.

=== 2 November ===
The main opposition party, Chadema, formally rejected the election results, calling them "completely fabricated" and stating the protests were evidence that citizens did not accept the outcome; the government rejected the claims and asserted that it would use all security avenues to maintain order. The UK Foreign, Commonwealth and Development Office advised against "all but essential travel to Tanzania", stating that "there are shortages of food, fuel and cash, compounded by the lack of internet services".

=== 3 November ===
Samia Suluhu Hassan was sworn in to her new term as president, with the ceremony being held in a military parade ground in Dodoma, instead of a stadium as in previous years. While internet connectivity was widely restored throughout Tanzania on 3 November, Netblocks reported continued widespread restrictions to multiple social media and messaging platforms, thus preventing Tanzanians from transmitting and watching video. Camillus Wambura, Inspector-General of the Tanzania Police Force, blamed illegal immigrants for inciting the protests, and demanded that citizens report suspicious foreigners.

=== 4 November ===
The curfew in Dar es Salaam was officially lifted by police, several days after it had been imposed.

=== 5 November ===
The opposition party Chadema claimed that the number of protest deaths that they had documented had risen from 700, as reported on 31 October, to 2,000. They also claimed that the true death toll was even higher, accusing police of disposing of hundreds of unknown bodies at an undisclosed location. “Most bodies are still at the hospitals (and) the police are stopping people from taking dead bodies away,” said Chadema's communications director, Brenda Rupia, adding that “the police have thrown away over 400 bodies. We don't even know where they've taken them.” The death toll of 2,000, if confirmed, would be higher than even the death toll in the 2007–2008 Kenyan crisis following the 2007 Kenyan general election.

=== 7 November ===
Tanzanian prosecutors charged at least 240 people with treason and criminal conspiracy in relation to post-election protests, accusing them of attempting to obstruct the electoral process.

== Outbreak of protests ==
Protests started in Dar es Salaam during election day, with demonstrators burning tyres, blocking roads, and denouncing what they described as a "sham election". Clashes were reported near polling stations and government buildings, and several videos circulated online showing security forces firing live rounds into the air. By evening, authorities imposed a city-wide curfew, ordered businesses closed, and deployed additional police and military units.

== Cross-border impact ==
The post-election unrest in Tanzania also affected neighbouring Kenya. In the border town of Namanga, some protesters reportedly crossed into Kenya as Tanzanian security forces fired tear gas near the border, disrupting trade and forcing shops to close. The ongoing internet shutdown in Tanzania was also felt on the Kenyan side, affecting communication in the area.

The unrest also affected neighboring countries economies; at the border crossings of Songwe and Kasumulu between Malawi and Tanzania, transporters reported trucks stranded, customs offices vandalized and fuel supplies disrupted. Malawi's dependence on Tanzanian ports and trade routes magnified the impact of the unrest.

== Reactions ==
On 31 October the UN's OHCHR expressed alarm at "the deaths and injuries that have occurred" in the protests, and called for Tanzania to "promptly reinstate access to the internet and facilitate citizens’ full enjoyment of their rights to freedom of expression, association and peaceful assembly." On 1 November the ACHPR said that, if reports that hundreds were killed and injured were accurate, it "would constitute very grave violations of the African Charter on Human and Peoples' Rights" which Tanzania ratified in 1984. The ACHPR reiterated its call for Tanzania to sign and ratify the African Charter on Democracy, Elections and Governance.

On 10 November the Catholic Church in Tanzania condemned the killing of protestors, with Archbishop Jude Thaddaeus Ruwa'ichi saying at a funeral service that "The punishment for protests is not to shoot and kill." The Economist described the crackdown as "terror on an unprecedented scale" for Tanzania and called it the CCM's "Tiananmen Square moment."

Chadema, Tanzania's main opposition party called this “the worst human rights crisis in Tanzania's history”, calling out to the United Nations, the International Criminal Court (ICC), and the Southern African Development Community (SADC) and other international organizations to investigate the deadly events.

== Massacre allegation ==
Several reports emerging two weeks after the protests called the situation a massacre. These allegations came as there are sufficient reports of police shooting live ammunitions at the protestors and bystanders, video footage of injured and dead bodies, claims that police forces, have hidden bodies, committed extrajudicial killings, mass graves were dug throughout the country and claims that thousands of civilians were killed during the time of the protests. These actions were done according to reports under an internet shutdown in Tanzania.

In November 2025, a CNN investigation revealed that police and armed forces shot at protesters, many of them unarmed or were only carrying stones and sticks. Many protesters were killed or hurt. Videos, sound analysis, witness stories, and satellite images, all indicate that the government used extreme violence to crush the protests, while imposing a curfew, internet blackout, and censorship of protest documentation. There are indications that victims may have been buried in mass graves, and morgues were filled with bodies, mostly young men. The UN estimate that hundreds were killed and they are calling for an independent investigation.

Widespread use of lethal force was also documented by Amnesty International.

== Government report ==
Following the protests, an appointed government commission investigated the events. In April 2026, it published a report stating that 518 people were killed during the protests. Even though the report claims the violence and protests were planned and organized, it does not state who stood behind them. The report was highly criticized by the opposition, saying the government is "whitewashing" the violence, covering up the real extent of abuse and avoiding responsibility, as security forces are the main cause for the violence. They also state the amount of victims are much higher.

== See also ==
- 2025 Cameroonian protests
- List of protests in the 21st century
