= Camillus Wambura =

Tanzanian civil servant

11th Inspector General of Police (IGP)
- Incumbent
- Assumed office July 19, 2022
- President: Samia Suluhu
- Preceded by: Simon Sirro

Personal details
- Born: Camillus Mongosso Wambura
- Occupation: Police officer
- Police career
- Allegiance: Tanzania
- Branch: Tanzania National Police
- Service years: 2022 –
- Status: Active
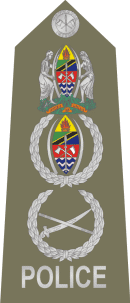
- Rank: I.G.P

Camillus Mongoso Wambura is a Tanzanian civil servant and current Inspector-general of police force in Tanzania. He was appointed by Tanzanian President Samia Suluhu Hassan on July 19, 2022.
