= 2025 Oust Anwar rally =

2025 political protest in Kuala Lumpur, Malaysia

Oust Anwar rally هيمڤونن تورون انور Himpunan Turun Anwar
- Part of Gen Z protests in Asia
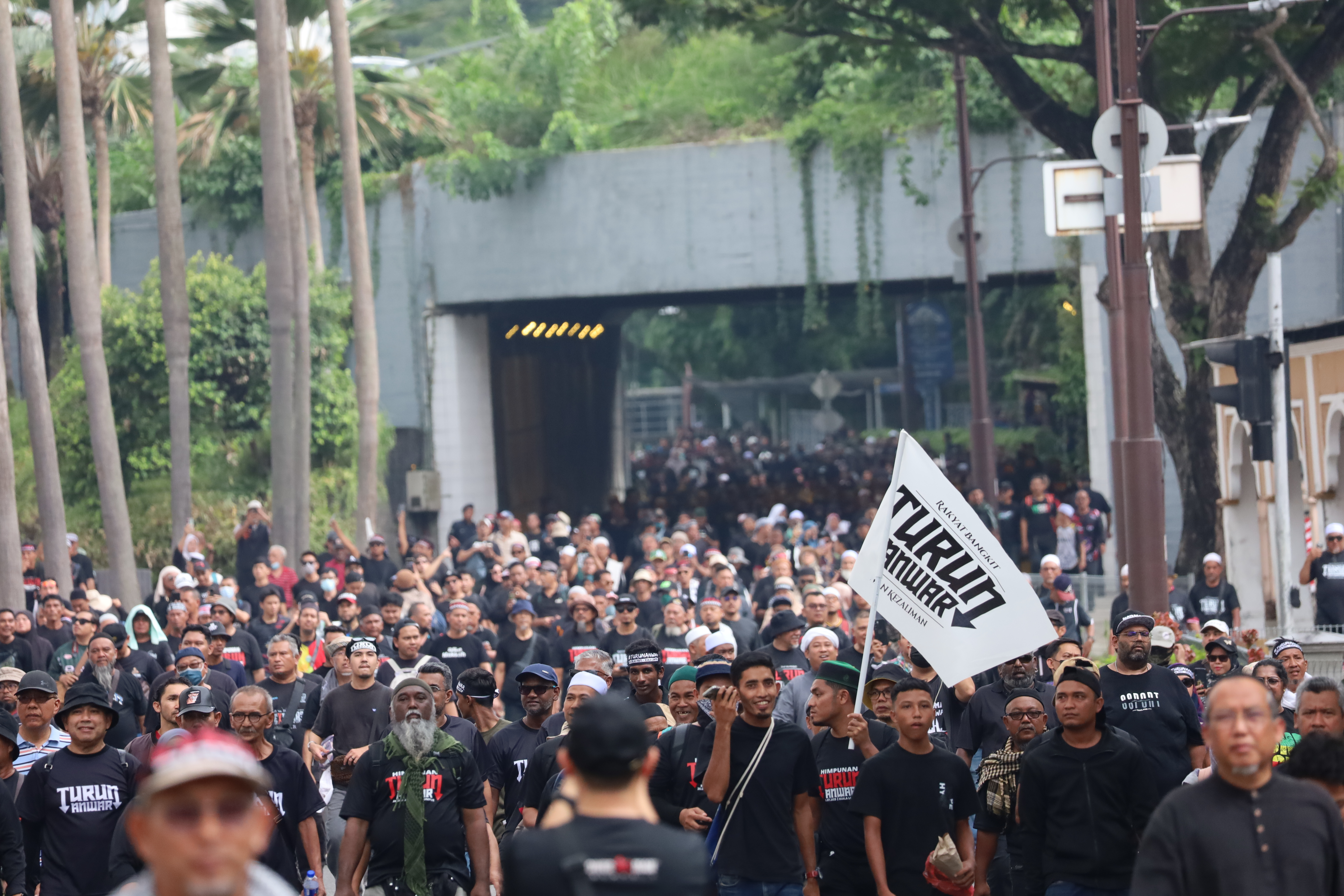
- Participants are seen marching to Dataran Merdeka, Kuala Lumpur for the final event of the Oust Anwar rally. A participant is seen holding a white flag that says "TURUN ANWAR" ("OUST ANWAR").
- Date: 26 July 2025 (Saturday); 9:00 am – 6:00 pm (MST) (Around 9 hours)
- Location: Dataran Merdeka, Kuala Lumpur, Malaysia (Marching from Dataran Sogo, Jamek Mosque, National Mosque and Central Market)
- Caused by: Public dissatisfaction with the government under the leadership of Prime Minister Anwar Ibrahim; Increasing prices of goods; High cost of living; Implementation of the Urban Renewal Act (URA); Increasing prices of Liquefied Petroleum Gas (LPG); Abolition of subsidies; Failure to carry out reforms; Implementation of Sales and Services Tax (SST); Political intimidation
- Goals: Resignation of Anwar Ibrahim
- Methods: Peaceful assembly; Political demonstration; Speeches and sermons; Internet activism
- Concessions: Reduction of petrol price; Distribution of 15 billion ringgit (US$3.55 billion) of cash handout; Freezing of the plan to raise toll price; Reinstatement and cabinet reshuffle

Parties
#OustAnwar Rally Secretariat (Note: Initially, the rally was organised by the Malaysian PAS Youth Council (DPPM), but the organiser was changed and rebranded to the #OustAnwar Rally Secretariat (led by DPPM).); PN; BERSATU; PAS; GERAKAN; MIPP; GTA; PUTRA; BERJASA; PEJUANG; PPP; URIMAI; MAP; PERKASA	Government of Malaysia; Ministry of Home Affairs; Royal Malaysian Police; Federal Reserve Unit; Prime Minister's Department; Ministry of Federal Territories; Kuala Lumpur City Hall; Malaysian Civil Defence Force; Ministry of Housing and Local Government; Fire and Rescue Department of Malaysia; PH; PKR; DAP; AMANAH

Lead figures
Muhyiddin Yassin; Hamzah Zainudin; Mahathir Mohamad; Muhammad Sanusi Md Nor; Afnan Hamimi Taib Azamudden; Muhammad Hilman Idham	Anwar Ibrahim; Saifuddin Nasution Ismail; Mohd Khalid Ismail; Zaliha Mustafa; Maimunah Mohd Sharif; Aminurrahim Mohamed; Nga Kor Ming; Nor Hisham Mohammad

Number
~18,000 participants (Note: The RMP estimates about 18,000 participants who joined the rally.); ~25,000 participants (Note: Malaysiakini estimated that around 25,000 participants joined the rally today according to reports from journalists on the ground.); ~300,000 participants (Note: Harakahdaily estimated that around 300,000 participants joined the rally today according to reports from journalists on the ground.)	~3,000 police officers (Note: The RMP has increased the force to 3,000 police personnel to ensure the situation at the gathering remains under control.)

The 2025 Oust Anwar rally (Jawi: هيمڤونن تورون انور; Malay: Himpunan Turun Anwar) was a protest rally held in Kuala Lumpur on 26 July 2025. The protest was organized by the Secretariat of the #OustAnwar Rally and supported by the Malaysian Opposition, which consists of political parties within the Perikatan Nasional (PN) coalition and other smaller parties. The main location chosen for the protest was Dataran Merdeka in Kuala Lumpur.

== Overview ==
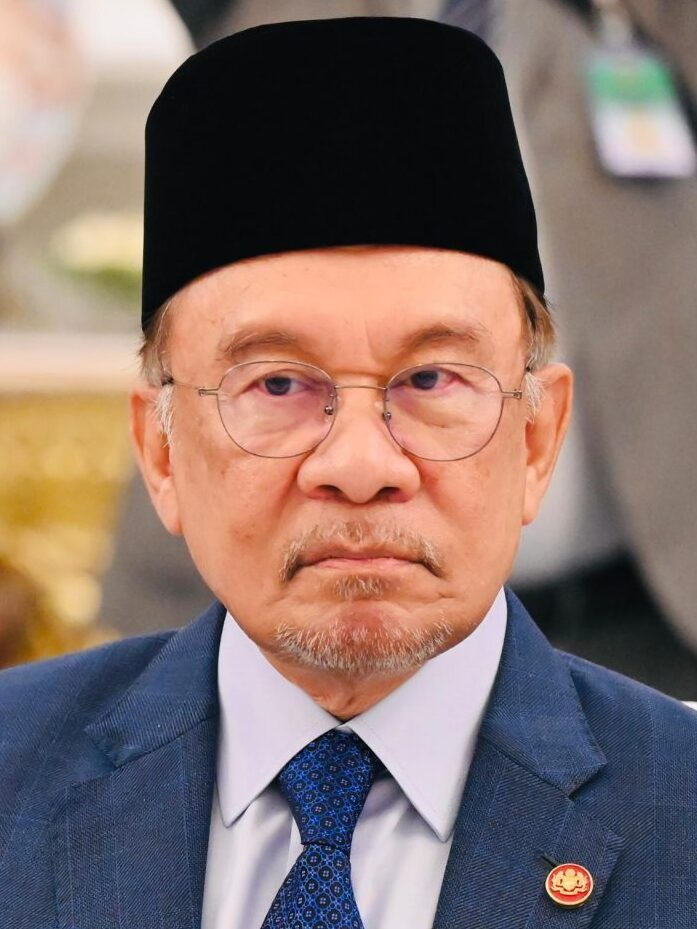
Prime Minister of Malaysia, Anwar Ibrahim

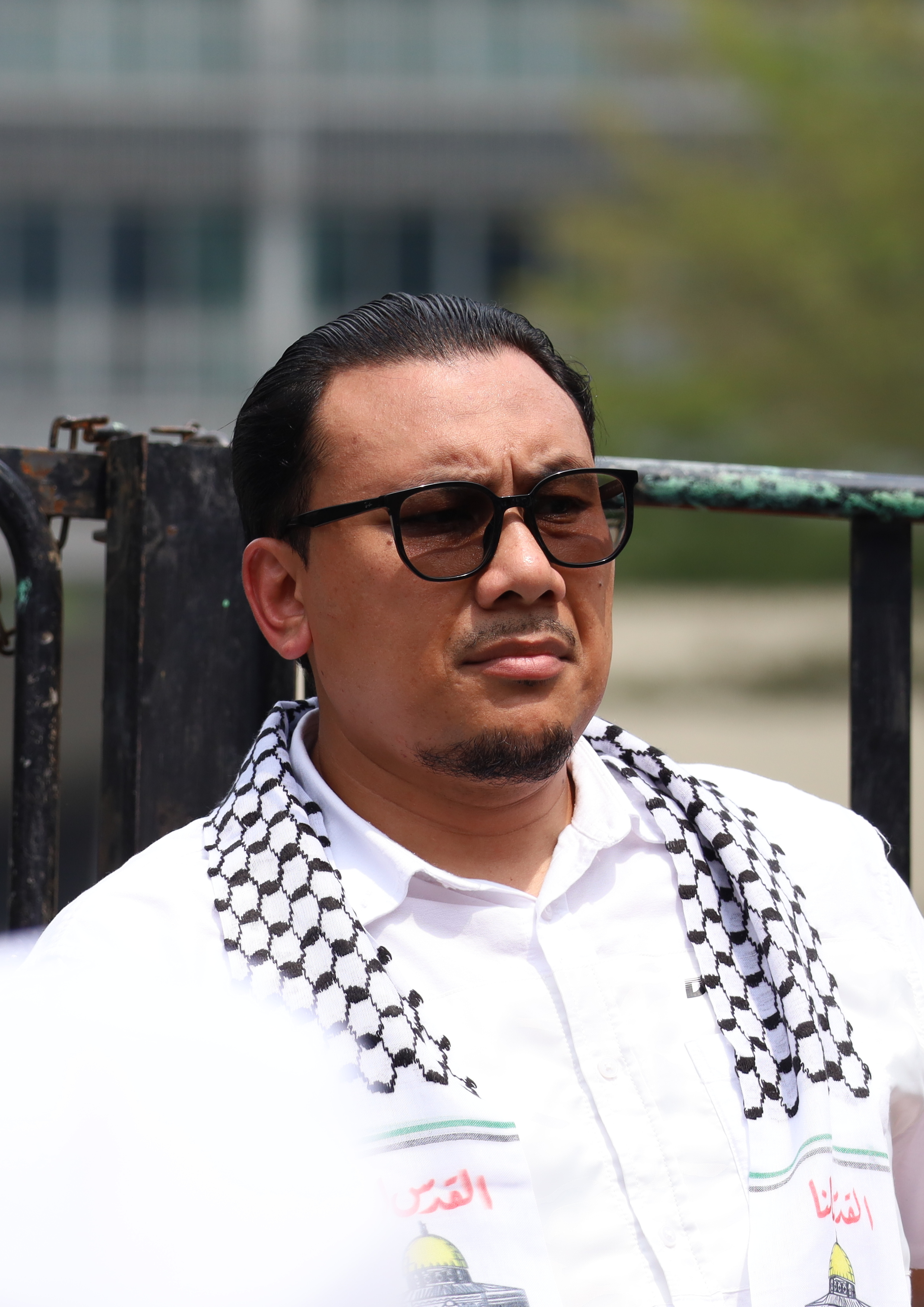
Malaysia PAS Youth Chief, Afnan Hamimi Taib Azamudden

The main goal of the rally is to bring down the current Prime Minister, Anwar Ibrahim (left) and the Malaysian Unity Government he leads. PAS Youth chief Afnan Hamimi Taib Azamudden (right) explained that initially, a rally was to be held to protest the Urban Regeneration Act (URA), but it was changed to "Oust Anwar Rally".

The protest was held, among other things, to express the people's dissatisfaction with the government led by Prime Minister, Anwar Ibrahim. The protest was also held to protest the implementation of the Urban Renewal Act (URA), the increase in the price of Liquefied Petroleum Gas (LPG), the elimination of subsidies, the failure to carry out reforms in Malaysian politics, the implementation of the Sales and Services Tax (SST) and the political intimidation of the opposition by the Malaysian Unity Government. PAS Youth chief Afnan Hamimi Taib Azamudden also added that the rally was intended to express solidarity with Muhammed Yusoff Rawther, a former research assistant to Anwar who was accused of trafficking cannabis and possessing two imitation pistols last year.

Initially, the rally was called the "Himpunan Bantah URA" ("Protest Against URA Rally") which was organised by the Malaysian PAS Youth Council (DPPM), but PAS Youth Chief Afnan Hamimi said the initial plan to hold a rally to protest the government's proposal to introduce the Urban Renewal Act (URA) was changed to "Oust Anwar Rally". There were allegations that the rally was changed or rebranded because it didn't receive a warm response from the public. Tuaran PKR branch chief Razeef Rakimin said the issue did not receive a response because the people understood the purpose of urban renewal. He also added that "PAS's action to change the rally's name was because the issue they were campaigning for did not receive a response".

According to an open letter inviting people to attend the rally, there are 15 reasons why the public should join this gathering, including:

- Failure to reduce the cost of living of the people,
- Promises of 15th General Election broken,
- Prices of goods rising, salaries not rising,
- Cronyism and nepotism getting worse,
- Malaysia Madani policy is only "played on paper",
- Education and public health are increasingly neglected,
- The people are divided by racial and religious sentiments,
- The original spirit of Reformasi has been betrayed,
- GLCs are still wasteful, leakages are rampant,
- The country has no clear economic direction,
- Agriculture and food have failed to develop,
- Abolition of pensions and permanent employment positions in the public sector,
- Young people have lost hope of getting houses and jobs,
- The Palestinian issue is just a slogan, not action,
- Bribers continue to be protected,
- Anwar is a symbol of failure and elite manipulation.

== Preparations ==
Perikatan Nasional (PN) have targeted at least 300,000 participants who will attended the rally, while the RMP have expected approximately 10,000 to 15,000 participants who will present. It is expected that 2,000 police officers will be deployed to control the rally. Opposition Leader and Larut MP, Hamzah Zainudin expected around 500,000 up to 1,000,000 participants will present, whereas Arau MP, Shahidan Kassim expected at least 300,000 to 500,000 people.

Due to the wild and inflated claims of the PN leaders, the rally was considered an anti-climax and a flop when less than 20,000 attended.

The RMP has received nearly 60 police reports across Malaysia, with 10 in Kuala Lumpur in connection with the rally. Acting Kuala Lumpur Police Chief Datuk Mohamed Usuf Jan Mohamad said participants are expected to gather at five main locations, namely the National Mosque, Central Market, Masjid Jamek Sultan Abdul Samad, Masjid Jamek Kampung Baru and Dataran Sogo before moving to Dataran Merdeka. He added that "To ensure the safety of public service users at the maximum level, public service operators and the police will be reinforced at several stations involved". Among the stations involved are the KL Sentral, Masjid Jamek, Pasar Seni, Dang Wangi, Plaza Rakyat and Bandaraya LRT stations; as well as MRT and Monorail stations such as Muzium Negara, Merdeka, Bukit Bintang, Imbi, Raja Chulan, Bukit Nanas, Medan Tuanku and Chow Kit.

On the same day, Prime Minister, Anwar made an announcement and was broadcast live on television stations and social media platforms to provide a one-off RM100 donation to every Malaysian citizens and adults aged 18 years and above through their respective MyKads under the Basic Rahmah Contribution (SARA) program. The donation will be made on Merdeka Day on 31 August and the donation will benefit 22 million Malaysians with an allocation of RM2.0 billion. He also announced an additional public holiday on Monday, 15 September 2025 in conjunction with Malaysia Day, the allocation for the MADANI Rahmah Sales was doubled to RM600 million and it was expanded to all 600 DUN constituencies so that the price of basic goods was affordable, there was no increase in tolls for 10 highways after the government allocated more than RM500 million to absorb the cost and the price of RON95 petrol was reduced to RM1.99 per litre in September 2025.

Acting President of the Malaysian United Democratic Alliance (MUDA), Amira Aisya Abdul Aziz said the party was not one of the organisers of the rally. However, any member was not prevented from joining the rally because the MUDA party leadership respected the people's right to participate in peaceful assemblies. PAS Deputy President, Tuan Ibrahim Tuan Man said that PAS is ready to provide legal services to civil servants who will be subject to disciplinary action if they join the rally. He added that "The people's right to assemble is guaranteed in the Malaysian Constitution. So when the Constitution guarantees it, there should be no other regulations that contradict the Constitution. Even civil servants, they have the right to assemble and before, many groups of civil servants have assembled, for example doctors. So if anyone will be subject to action, every party is ready to provide assistance. God willing, we are confident that many parties will help".

== Controversies ==
=== Ban on civil servants joining the rally by KSN ===
The Chief Secretary to the Government of Malaysia, Shamsul Azri Abu Bakar, has warned all civil servants working under the Malaysian public sector not to participate in the Oust Anwar rally. He also added that the action of participating in the rally is not in line with the principle of "Loyalty to the King and Country" contained in the Rukun Negara.

=== Support from AGC regarding KSN's ban ===
The Attorney General's Chambers of Malaysia (AGC) has stressed that the constitutionally guaranteed right to freedom of expression and peaceful assembly is not absolute. The AGC added that every civil servant is subject to a letter of undertaking as provided for in subregulation 20(3) of the Civil Servants (Appointment, Promotion and Termination of Service) Regulations 2012. The AGC added that "This Department also stresses that, although Articles 10(1)(a) and 10(1)(b) provide for the right of every citizen to speak and express his opinion, as well as the right to assemble peacefully and unarmed, these rights are not absolute. Accordingly, any public assembly is also subject to the requirement to comply with existing laws including specific instructions issued by the authorities including instructions by the Chief Secretary to the Government of Malaysia (KSN) to civil servants".

=== Garbage left by participants ===
Avatar of Nga Kor Ming

Nga Kor Ming
(@NgaKorMing)
tweeted:

As the Minister in charge of the public cleaning agency @swcorp_my, I feel very sorry for the dirty behavior of PN & throwing garbage everywhere.

The Madani government celebrates democracy & there is no obstacle to peaceful assembly but please maintain cleanliness.

Don't embarrass the country.

Understand?

Jul 26, 2025

On 26 July 2025, the Minister of Housing and Local Government, Nga Kor Ming, criticized the actions of the participants of the Oust Anwar rally who threw garbage everywhere, causing inconvenience to the sanitation workers. Through a post on the X platform, the Teluk Intan Member of Parliament stressed that due to the irresponsible actions of the opposition supporters, the Solid Waste Management and Public Cleaning Corporation (SWCorp) had to work hard to clean up the dirt left behind. It is understood that 15 metric tons or 15,000 kilograms (kg) of garbage were left behind by the participants of the rally.

=== Arrest of participants on sedition charges ===
One of the participants in the rally, Badrul Hisham Shaharin, also known as Chegubard, the Bersatu Port Dickson chief, was arrested by the RMP and charged with four offences, namely Section 14 of the Minor Offences Act 1955, Section 504 of the Penal Code, Section 233 of the Communications and Multimedia Act 1998, and Section 4(1) of the Sedition Act 1948. His lawyer, Muhammad Rafique Rashid Ali, said that his party was informed at 2.30 pm today that he was arrested at his residence. Muhammad Rafique condemned the authorities' action, claiming that it was unnecessary because Badrul Hisham had already set an appointment to meet the police investigator in charge of his case at Bukit Aman the next day.

== See also ==
- Occupy Dataran
- 2013 Malaysian general election protest
- May Day anti-GST rally 2014
- People's Uprising rally
- Tangkap Najib rally
- 2018 anti-ICERD rally
- 2025 Indonesian protests
- 2025 Nepalese Gen Z protests
- 2025 Philippine anti-corruption protests
- 2025 Timor-Leste protests
- Gaza war protests at universities
