= Corruption in Paraguay =

Observers maintain that corruption in Paraguay remains a major impediment to the emergence of stronger democratic institutions and sustainable economic development in Paraguay.

== Duarte presidency ==
President Nicanor Duarte's measures to combat corruption during his 2003-2008 administration included increased penalties for tax evasion and other measures to increase tax revenue, greater oversight of government spending, and a crackdown on the trade of contraband and counterfeit goods.

He also removed members of the Supreme Court after corruption allegations surfaced against them.

== Cartes presidency ==
On 22 July 2022, Antony J. Blinken, Secretary of State of the United States, announced that —

The United States is designating former Paraguayan President Horacio Manuel Cartes Jara for his involvement in significant corruption. Former President Cartes obstructed a major international investigation into transnational crime in order to protect himself and his criminal associate from potential prosecution and political damage. These actions undermined the stability of Paraguay’s democratic institutions by contributing to public perception of corruption and impunity within the office of the Paraguayan President. Additionally, these actions enabled and perpetuated Cartes’s recently documented involvement with foreign terrorist organizations and other U.S.-designated entities which undermines the security of the United States against transnational crime and terrorism and threatens regional stability.

This public designation is made under Section 7031(c) of the Department of State, Foreign Operations, and Related Programs Appropriations Act, 2022. The Department is also designating Cartes’s adult children Juan Pablo Cartes Montaña, Sofía Cartes Montaña, and María Sol Cartes Montaña.

These designations reaffirm the commitment of the United States to combat corruption, which harms the public interest, hampers countries’ economic prosperity, and curtails the ability of governments to respond effectively to the needs of their people. The United States continues to stand with all Paraguayans in support of democracy and the rule of law and will continue to promote accountability for those who abuse public power for personal gain.

On 26 January 2023, the United States announced further sanctions against Cartes, prohibiting him to do business with U.S. companies or have access to U.S. banks under the Magnitsky Act sanctions program. Four Cartes companies operating in the United States are also blocked from accessing the country's financial system under the Specially Designated Nationals and Blocked Persons List (SDN List) managed by the Office of Foreign Assets Control (OFAC): Tabacos USA, Bebidas USA, Dominicana Acquisition and Frigorífico Chajha. On 31 March, it was announced that Tabacalera del Este S.A. (Tabesa), another Cartes company (of which Tabacos USA was its U.S. branch) was also added to the SDN List.

On 24 March 2023. Cartes announced that, as a result of the sanctions, he was leaving the Grupo Cartes conglomerate, citing that many jobs were in risk and hoped that his separation to the group wouldn't "risk" the well-being of the Grupo Cartes's workers's families. Grupo Cartes later announced that Cartes's sister Sarah was also leaving the conglomerate and that the brand itself would be discontinued.

In October 2025, the US State Department announced the lifting of sanctions on Cartes, saying that the sanctions were no longer in the interests of the United States. Cartes thanked President Trump, while current President Santiago Peña, an ally of Cartes, also extended his gratitude to the US government. It is still unclear if the travel ban was included in the decision.

== Present situation ==
On Transparency International's 2025 Corruption Perceptions Index, Paraguay scored 24 on a scale from 0 ("highly corrupt") to 100 ("very clean"). When ranked by score, Paraguay ranked 150th among the 182 countries in the Index, where the country ranked first is perceived to have the most honest public sector. For comparison with regional scores, the best score among the countries of the Americas (Note: Argentina, Bahamas, Barbados, Belize, Bolivia, Brazil, Canada, Chile, Colombia, Costa Rica, Cuba, Dominica, Dominican Republic, Ecuador, El Salvador, Grenada, Guatemala, Guyana, Haiti, Honduras, Jamaica, Mexico, Nicaragua, Panama, Paraguay, Peru, Saint Lucia, Saint Vincent and the Grenadines, Suriname, Trinidad and Tobago, United States of America, Uruguay, Venezuela) was 75, the average score was 42 and the worst score was 10. For comparison with worldwide scores, the best score was 89 (ranked 1), the average score was 42, and the worst score was 9 (ranked 181, in a two-way tie).

This ranking was an improvement from the 2004 Index when the country was classified among the six most corrupt countries in the world and the second most corrupt in the Western Hemisphere. The opposition, however, has claimed that anti-corruption efforts have not been far-reaching enough because they have not addressed the clientelism that is pervasive in Paraguayan politics or the dominance of the Colorado Party in governmental institutions.

== See also ==
- Crime in Paraguay
