= Sub-Saharan African music traditions =

Traditional sound-based art forms developed by sub-Saharan African peoples

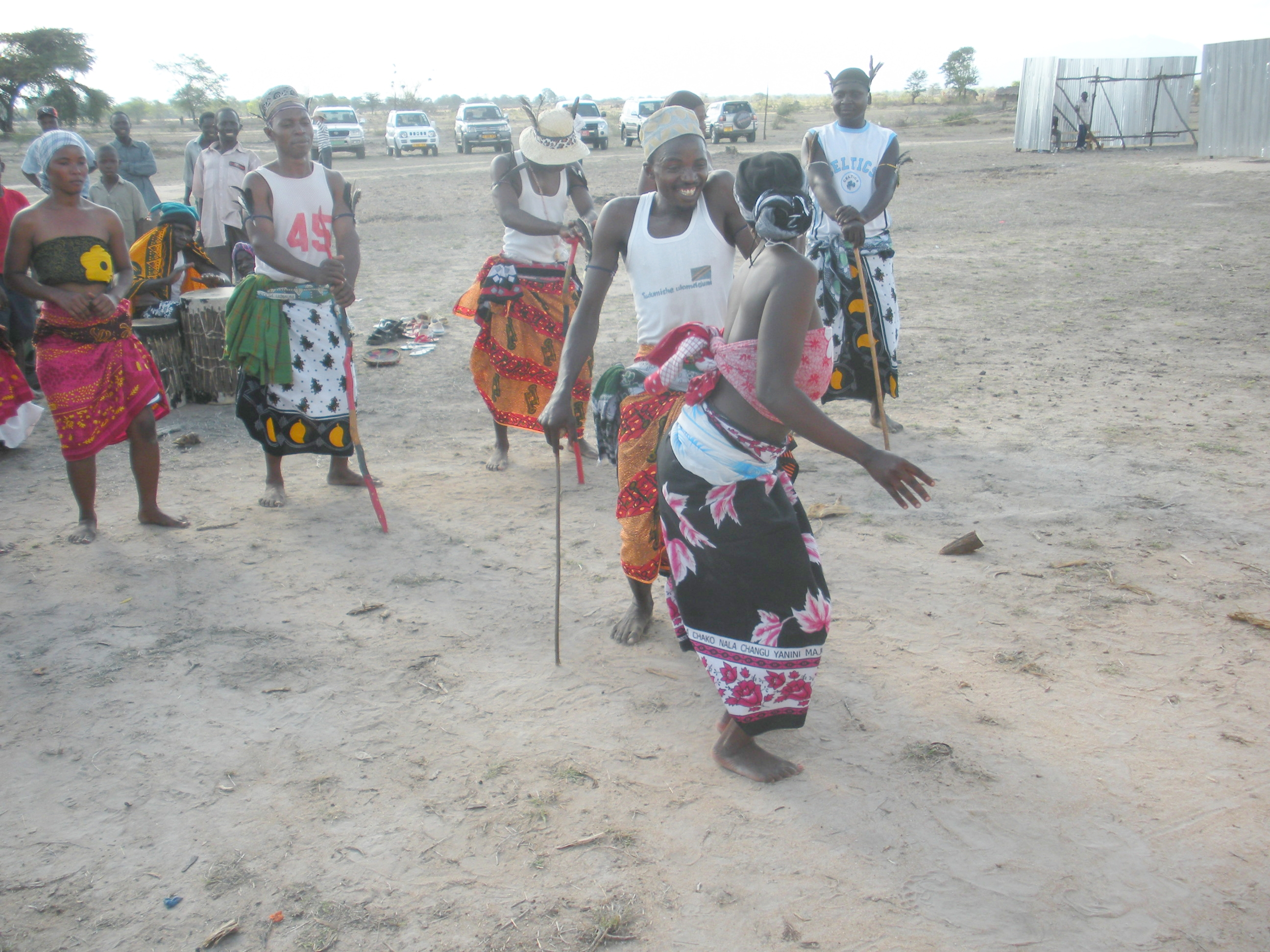
Drumming and dancing at Dakawa, Morogoro, Tanzania

In many parts of sub-Saharan Africa, the use of music is not limited to entertainment: it serves a purpose to the local community and helps in the conduct of daily routines. Traditional African music supplies appropriate music and dance for work and for religious ceremonies of birth, naming, rites of passage, marriage and funerals. The beats and sounds of the drum are used in communication as well as in cultural expression.

African dances are largely participatory: there are traditionally no barriers between dancers and onlookers except with regard to spiritual, religious and initiation dances. Even ritual dances often have a time when spectators participate. Dances help people work, mature, praise or criticize members of the community, celebrate festivals and funerals, compete, recite history, proverbs and poetry and encounter gods. They inculcate social patterns and values. Many dances are performed by only males or females. Dances are often segregated by gender, reinforcing gender roles in children. Community structures such as kinship, age, and status are also often reinforced. To share rhythm is to form a group consciousness, to entrain with one another, to be part of the collective rhythm of life to which all are invited to contribute.

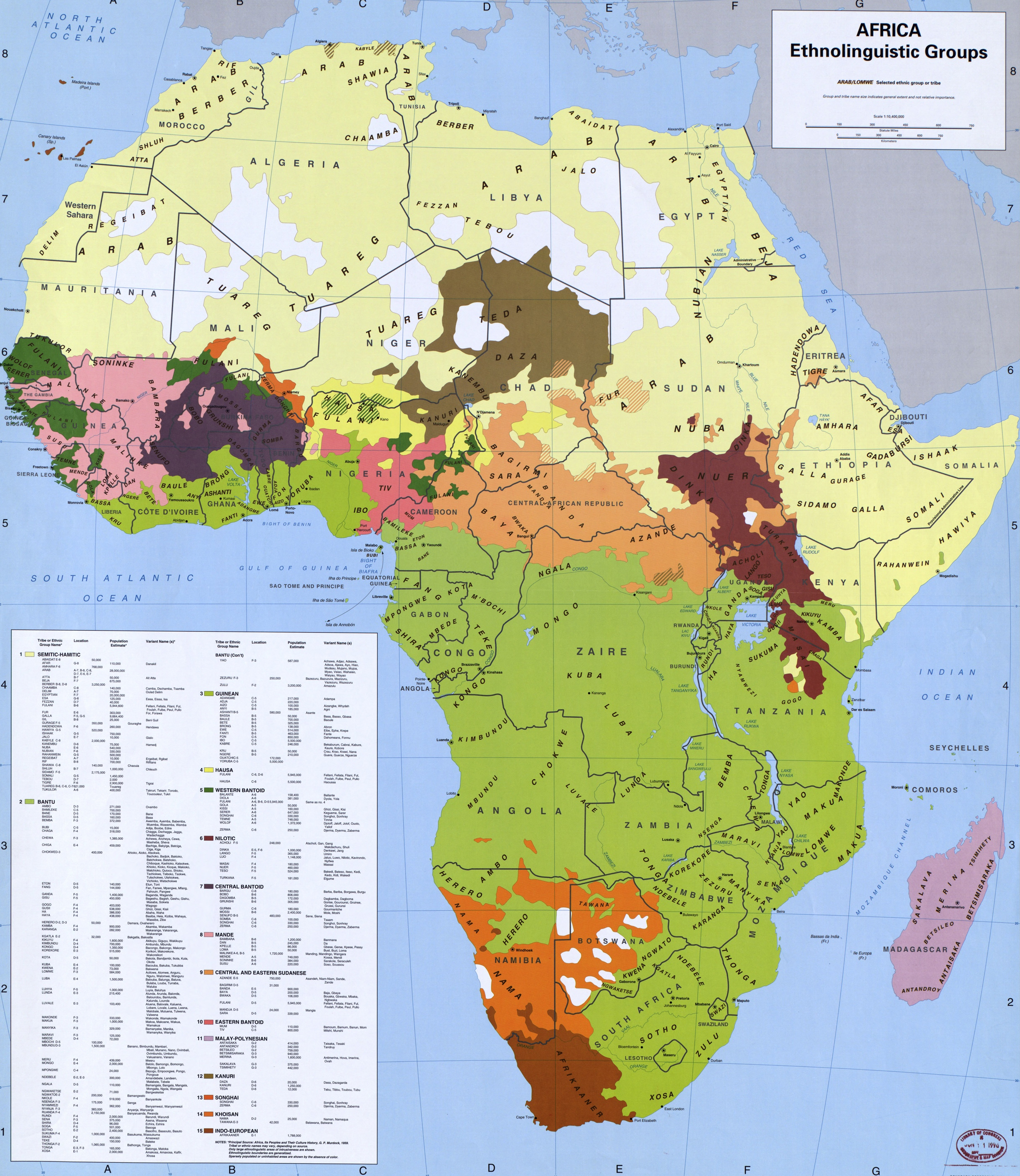
African ethnic groups

Yoruba dancers and drummers, for instance, express communal desires, values, and collective creativity. The drumming represents an underlying linguistic text that guides the dancing performance, allowing linguistic meaning to be expressed non-verbally. The spontaneity of these performances should not be confused with an improvisation that emphasizes the individual ego. The drummer's primary duty is to preserve the community. Master dancers and drummers are particular about the learning of the dance exactly as taught. Children must learn the dance exactly as taught without variation. Improvisation or a new variation comes only after mastering the dance, performing, and receiving the appreciation of spectators and the sanction of village elders.

The music of the Luo, for another example, is functional, used for ceremonial, religious, political or incidental purposes, during funerals (Tero buru) to praise the departed, to console the bereaved, to keep people awake at night, to express pain and agony and during cleansing and chasing away of spirits, during beer parties (Dudu, ohangla dance), welcoming back the warriors from a war, during a wrestling match (Ramogi), during courtship, in rain making and during divination and healing. Work songs are performed both during communal work like building, weeding, etc. and individual work like pounding of cereals, winnowing.

== Regions ==
Geo-political map of Africa divided for ethnomusicological purposes, after Merriam, 1959

Alan P. Merriam divided Africa into seven regions for ethnomusicological purposes, observing current political frontiers (see map), and this article follows this division as far as possible in surveying the music of ethnic groups in Africa.

- Music of the northern region of Africa (red on the map), including that of the Horn of Africa (dark green on the map), is mostly treated separately under Middle Eastern and North African music traditions.
- West African music (yellow on the map) includes the music of Senegal and the Gambia, of Guinea and Guinea-Bissau, Sierra Leone and Liberia, of the inland plains of Mali, Niger and Burkina Faso and also the coastal nations of Côte d'Ivoire, Ghana, Togo, Benin, Nigeria, Cameroon, Gabon and the Republic of the Congo as well as the islands of Cape Verde, São Tomé and Príncipe.
- Central African Music (dark blue on the map) includes the music of Chad, the Central African Republic, the Democratic Republic of the Congo and Zambia.
- The Eastern region (light green on the map) includes the music of Uganda, Kenya, Rwanda, Burundi, Tanzania, Malawi, Mozambique and Zimbabwe as well as the islands of Madagascar, the Seychelles, Réunion, Mauritius and Comoros. The eastern region has received south Asian and even Austronesian influences via the Indian Ocean.
- The Southern region (brown on the map) includes the music of South Africa, Lesotho, Eswatini, Botswana, Namibia and Angola.

=== Sahel and Sudan ===
- The music of Sudan (turquoise on the map) indicates the difficulty of dividing music traditions according to state frontiers. The musicology of Sudan involves some 133 language communities. that speak over 400 dialects, Afro-Asian, Nilotic and Niger–Congo.

In contrast to traditional Arabic music, most Sudanese music styles are pentatonic, and the simultaneous beats of percussion or singing in polyrhythms are further prominent characteristics of Sudanese music.

Sudan takes its name from that of the sub-Saharan savanna which makes, with the Nile, a great cross-roads of the region. South of the Sahara the Sahel forms a bio-geographic zone of transition between the desert and the Sudanian savannas, stretching between the Atlantic Ocean and the Red Sea. The Nilotic peoples prominent in southern Sudan, Uganda, Kenya, and northern Tanzania, include the Luo, Dinka, Nuer and Maasai. Many of these have been included in the Eastern region.

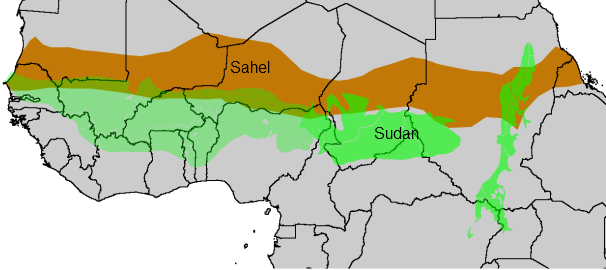
The sahel (brown) and the Sudan (green)

- The Dinka are a mainly agro-pastoral people inhabiting the Bahr el Ghazal region of the Nile basin, Jonglei and parts of southern Kordufan and Upper Nile regions. They number around 1.5 million, about 10% of the population. of Sudan.
- The Arabian rebab has found a home among the Nuba peoples.

The Senegambian Fula have migrated as far as Sudan at various times, often speaking Arabic as well as their own language. The Hausa people, who speak a language related to Ancient Egyptian and Biblical Hebrew, have moved in the opposite direction. Further west the Berber music of the Tuareg has penetrated to Sub-Saharan countries. These are included in the Western region, but the music of Sub-Saharan herders and nomads is heard from west to east.

Blues historian and historian of African American music such as Paul Oliver and Samuel Charters an American music historian, have suggested that the essential elements of the blues originated in the Sahel region of West Africa, brought over by Africans via the slave trade. Whereas the African slaves brought to South America and the Caribbean were largely from percussion-based cultures in southern coastal west Africa (like southern Nigeria), central Africa and Bantu-speaking parts of Africa lacking in many elements that created the blues, many of the slaves brought to North America were from the Sahel region and much more familiar with stringed instruments, basing the banjo on string instruments from the Sahel like the akonting. Charters found that many Sahelian slaves were from Muslim cultures and favored stringed instruments, melodic, and solo melismatic singing, which differed from the drum-based music of other African regions who generally favoured drumming and group chants. These traditions, which were sometimes permitted by plantation owners who feared drums as tool of rebellion and thus evolved into the blues.

The historian Sylviane Diouf and ethnomusicologist Gerhard Kubik identify Islamic music as an influence on blues music. Diouf notes a striking resemblance between the Islamic call to prayer (originating from Bilal ibn Rabah, a famous Abyssinian African Muslim in the early 7th century) and 19th-century field holler music, noting that both have similar lyrics praising God, melody, note changes, "words that seem to quiver and shake" in the vocal chords, dramatic changes in musical scales, and nasal intonation. She attributes the origins of field holler music to African Muslim slaves who accounted for an estimated 30% of African slaves in America. According to Kubik, "the vocal style of many blues singers using melisma, wavy intonation, and so forth is a heritage of that large region of the western Sahel that had been in contact with the Islamic world via the Maghreb since the seventh and eighth centuries, and the eastern Sahel, modern day Sudan, since the 9th century." The blues with its origin in the American south has likely evolved as a fusion of an African just intonation scale with European 12-tone musical instruments and harmony. The result has been a uniquely American music which is still widely practised in its original form and is at the foundation of another genre, American jazz.

Blue notes, a hallmark of blues music, and rhythm and blues, characterised by flattened thirds, fifths, or sevenths—have deep roots in the musical traditions of the Sahel region of West Africa, making African American popular music like the blues having a Sahelian based origin in contrast to the more percussion based Afro-Brazilian music and Afro-Cuban music which have more of a southern coastal west African, Central African and Bantu influence where the blue note is absent and non-Muslim slaves who generally favoured drums and group chants. The Griot tradition of the Sahel also may have influenced Talking blues and by extension Hip hop, The Griot tradition is also absent in Bantu speaking central , Eastern and Southern African cultures, Again pointing to a Sahel core origin of African American music

=== Western, central, eastern and southern territories ===
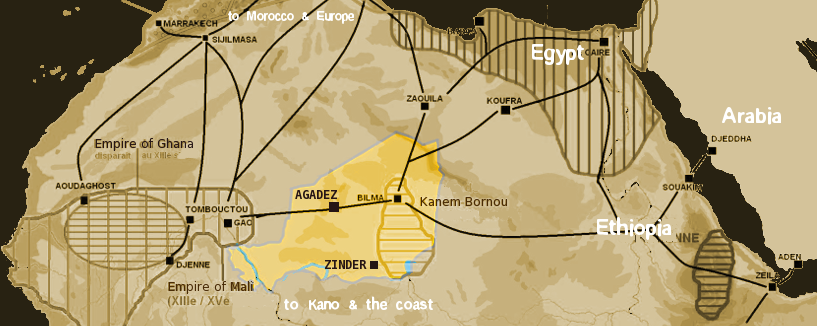
Saharan trade routes circa 1400

These remaining four regions are most associated with Sub-Saharan African music: familiar African musical elements such as the use of cross-beat and vocal harmony may be found all over all four regions, as may be some instruments such as the iron bell. This is largely due to the expansion of the Niger–Congo-speaking people that began around 1500 BC: the last phases of expansion were 0–1000 AD. Only a few scattered languages in this great area cannot readily be associated with the Niger–Congo language family. However two significant non-Bantu musical traditions, the Pygmy music of the Congo jungle and that of the bushmen of the Kalahari, do much to define the music of the central region and of the southern region respectively.

As a result of the migrations of Niger-Congo peoples (e.g., Bantu expansion), polyrhythmic culture (e.g., dance, music), which is generally associated with being a common trait among modern cultures of Africa Including Nilo-Saharan speakers in Sudan, spread throughout Southern Africa. Due to the Trans-Atlantic slave trade, music of the African diaspora, many of whom descend from Niger-Congo peoples, has had considerable influence upon modern Western forms of popular culture (e.g., dance, music).

== West Africa ==
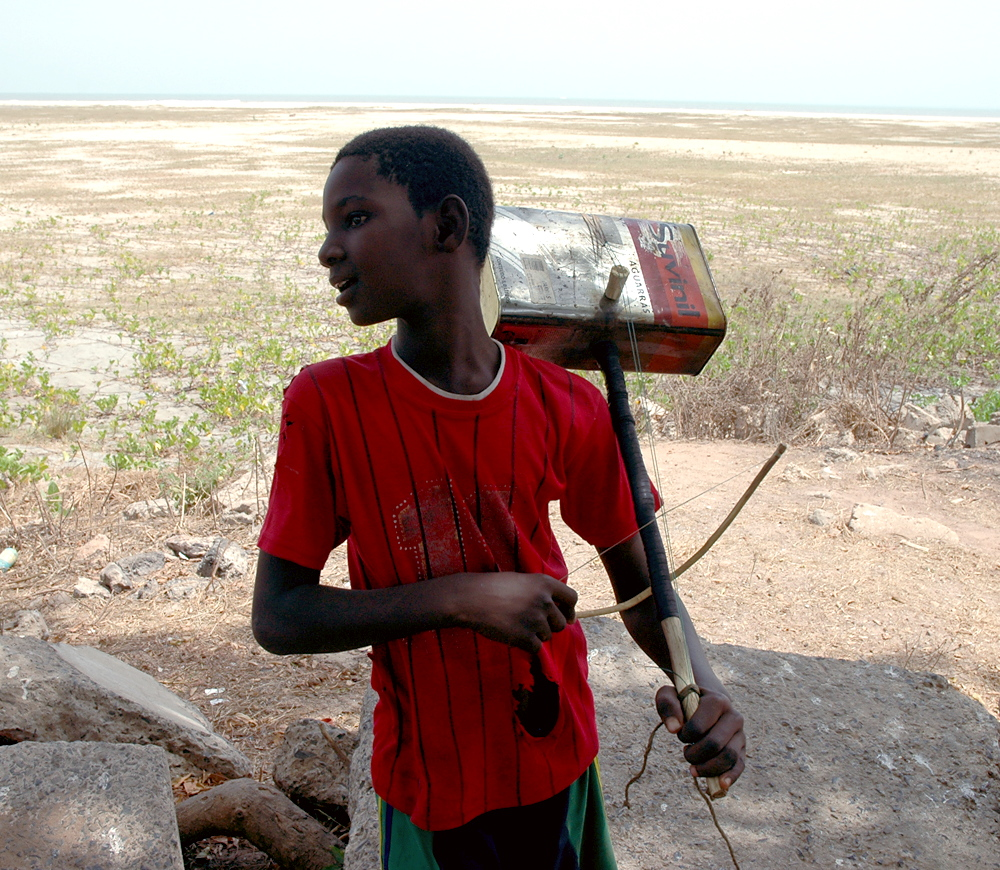
Gambian boy with bowed tin-can lute

The music of West Africa must be considered under two main headings: in its northernmost and westernmost parts, many of the above-mentioned transnational sub-Saharan ethnic influences are found among the Hausa, the Fulani, the Wolof people, the Mande speakers of Mali, Senegal and Mauritania, the Gur-speaking peoples of Mali, Burkina Faso and the northern halves of Ghana, Togo and Côte d'Ivoire, the Fula found throughout West Africa, and the Senufo speakers of Côte d'Ivoire and Mali.

The coastal regions are home to the Niger-Congo speakers; Kwa, Akan, the Gbe languages, spoken in Ghana, Togo, Benin, and Nigeria, the Yoruba and Igbo languages, spoken in Nigeria and the Benue–Congo languages of the east.

Inland and coastal languages are only distantly related. While the north, with its griot traditions, makes great use of stringed instruments and xylophones, the south relies much more upon drum sets and communal singing.

=== Northern ===
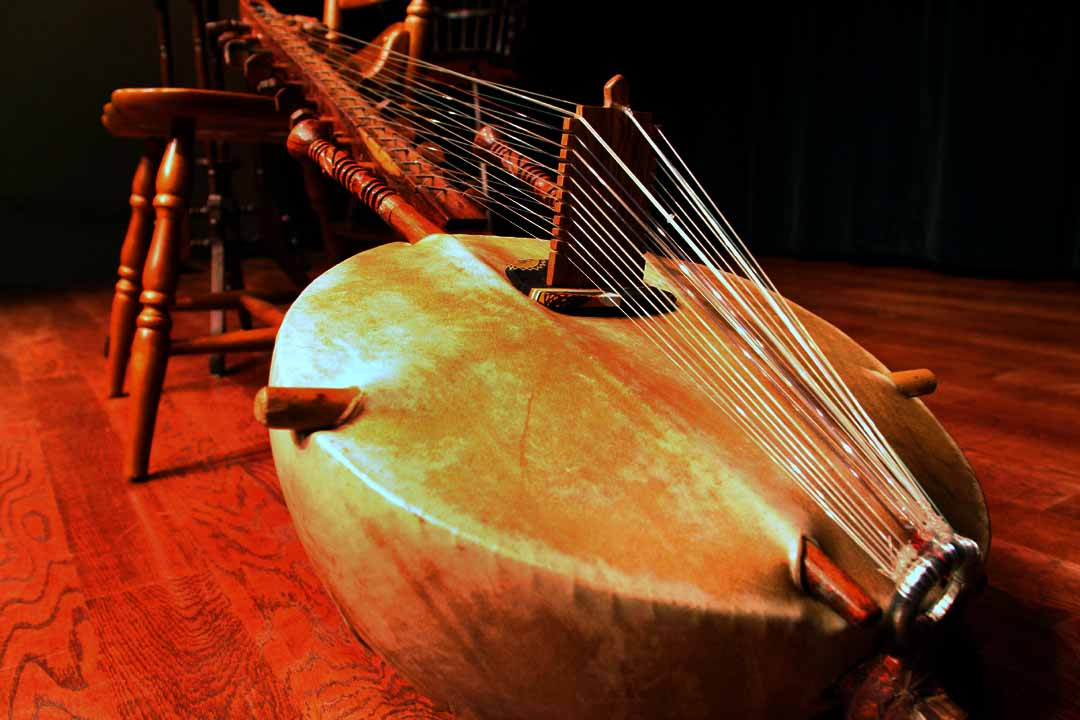
The Malian kora harp-lute is perhaps the most sophisticated of Africa's stringed instruments

Complex societies existed in the region from about 1500 BCE. The Ghana Empire existed from before c. 830 until c. 1235 in what is now south-east Mauritania and western Mali. The Sosso people had their capital at Koumbi Saleh until Sundiata Keita defeated them at the Battle of Kirina (c. 1240) and began the Mali Empire, which spread its influence along the Niger River through numerous vassal kingdoms and provinces. The Gao Empire at the eastern Niger bend was powerful in the ninth century CE but later subordinated to Mali until its decline. In 1340 the Songhai people made Gao the capital of a new Songhai Empire.

Funerary chant sung in Burkina Faso.

- The Hausa people are one of the largest ethnic groups in Nigeria, Niger, Sudan and many West and Central African countries. They speak a Chadic language. There are two broad categories of traditional Hausa music; rural folk music and urban court music developed in the Hausa Kingdoms before the Fulani War. Their folk music has played an important part in Nigerian music, contributing elements such as the goje, a one-stringed fiddle.
- The originally nomadic/pastoral Senegambian Fula people or Tukulor represent 40% of the population of Guinea and have spread to surrounding states and as far as Sudan in the east. In the 19th century they overthrew the Hausa and established the Sokoto Caliphate. The Fula play a variety of traditional instruments including drums, the hoddu (xalam), a plucked skin-covered lute similar to a banjo, and riti or riiti (a one-string bowed instrument similar to a violin), in addition to their vocal music. They also use end-blown bamboo flutes. Their griots are known as gawlo.
- Mande music: the music of Mali is dominated by forms derived from the Mande Empire Their musicians, professional performers called jeliw (sing. jeli, French griot), have produced popular alongside traditional music. Mande languages include Mandinka, Soninke, Bambara, Bissa, Dioula, Kagoro, Bozo, Mende, Susu, Vai and Ligbi: there are populations in Burkina Faso, Mauritania, Senegal, The Gambia, Guinea, Guinea-Bissau, Sierra Leone and Liberia and, mainly in the northern inland regions, in the south coast states of Côte d'Ivoire, Ghana, Togo, Benin and Nigeria.
- Wolof music: the Wolof people, the largest ethnic group in Senegal, kin to the Fula, have contributed greatly to popular Senegalese music. The related Serer people are notable for polyphonic song.

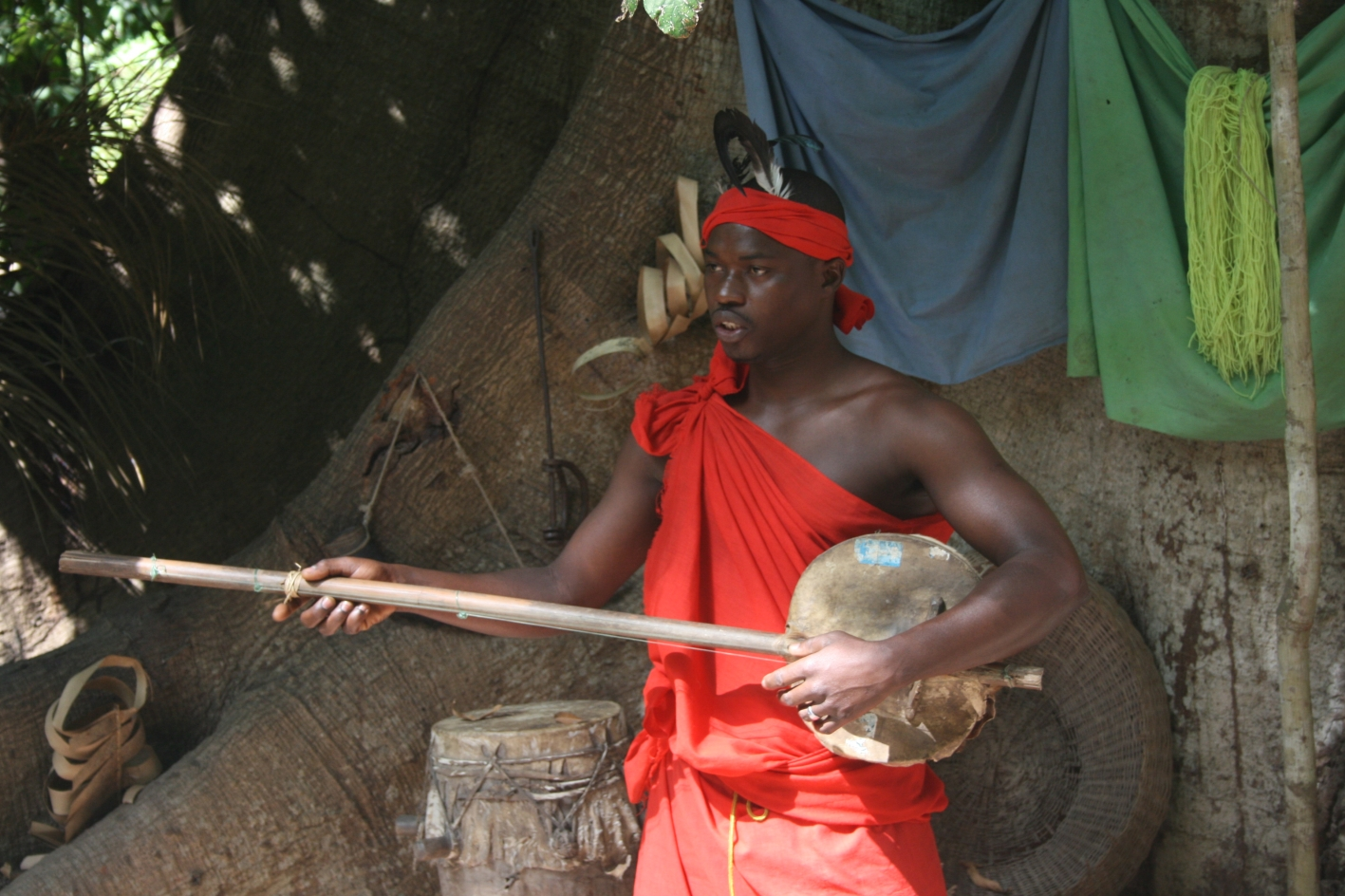
Jola man at Boucotte in Casamance (Sénégal) playing the akonting

- In Senegal, The Gambia and Guinea-Bissau the Jola are notable for their stringed instrument the akonting, a precursor of the banjo while the Balanta people, the largest ethnic group of Guinea-Bissau, play a similar gourd lute instrument called a kusunde or kussundé, with a short A♯/B drone string at the bottom, a top F♯ string of middle length and a middle C♯ string, the longest. Top string stopped gives G♯, middle string stopped is D♯.
- Songhai music, as interpreted by Ali Farka Toure, has gathered international interest for a minor pentatonic lute-and-voice style that is markedly similar to American blues.
- The Senufo or Senoufo, living in southern Mali and the extreme western corner of Burkina Faso to Katiola in Côte d'Ivoire with one group, the Nafana, in north-western Ghana. The Senufo are notable for funeral and poro music.

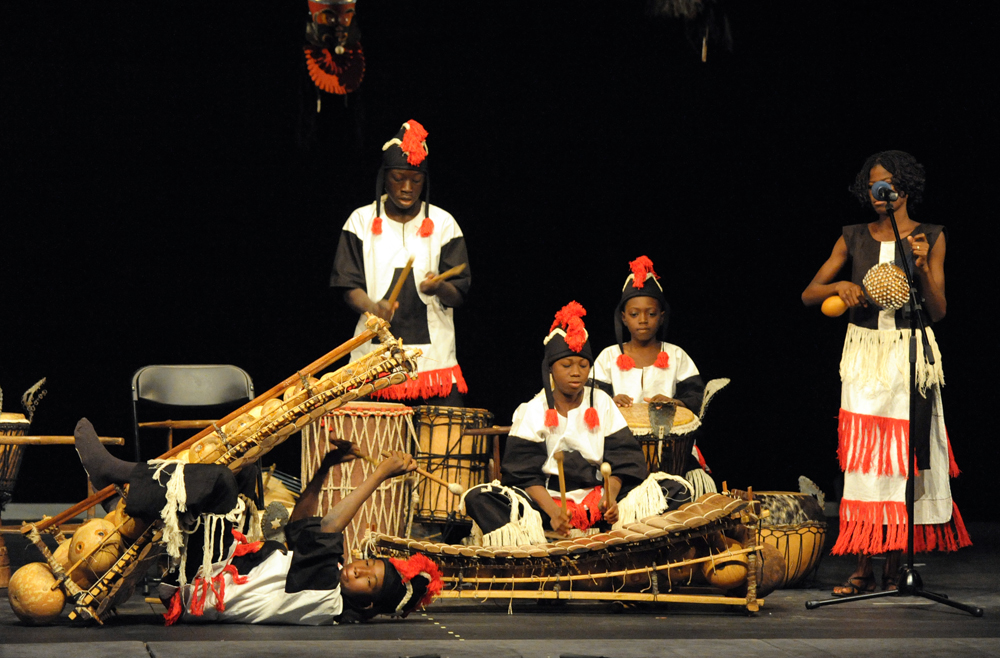
A performance group from Burkina Faso based on the balafon

- Among Gur-speaking peoples the Dagomba use the lunga talking drum and a bass drum with snares called a gungon, as well as the flute, gonje (goje) and bell. as well as molo (xalam) lute music, also played by Gurunsi peoples such as the Frafra. Similar styles are practised by local Fulani, Hausa, Djerma, Busanga and Ligbi speaking people. Drummers in Dagbon are storytellers, historians, bards of family ancestry who perform at events called sambanlunga.
- The Gurunsi, the Lobi, the Wala and the related Dagaaba people of Ghana and Burkina Faso and are known for complex interlocking (double meter) patterns on the xylophone (gyil).
- The Mossi people, whose Mossi Kingdoms in present-day Burkina Faso, withstood their Songhai and Mende neighbours before falling to the French, have a griot tradition. Also djambadon. also brosca.

=== The Gulf of Guinea ===
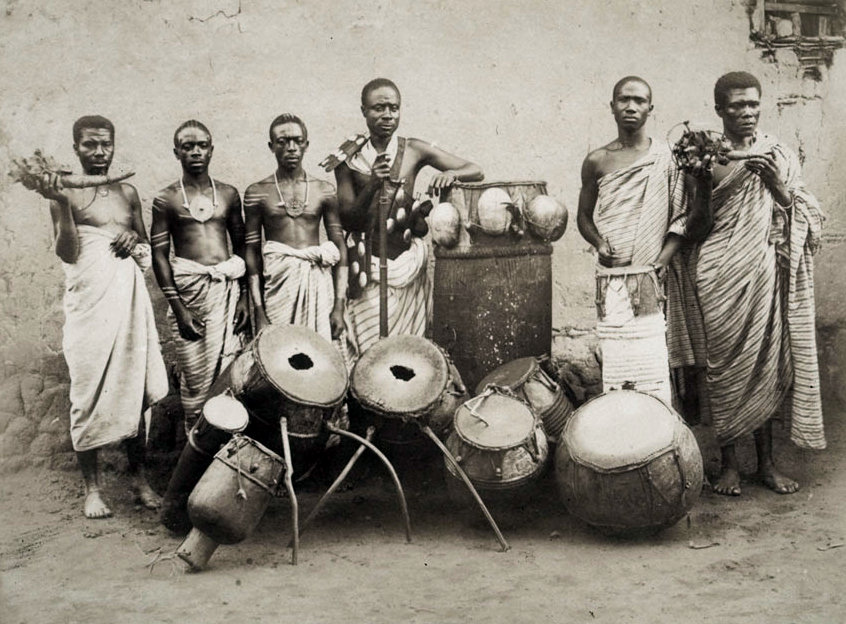
The musical ensemble of the chief of Abetifi (Kwahu people) c. 1890

- The Akan people include the Akwamu, Bono, Akyem, Fante, Ashanti, who originated the Adowa and kete styles, the Baoulé whose polyphonic music introduced the gbébé rhythm to Ivory Coast, the Nzema people who play the edengole. Akan peoples have complex court music including the atumpan and Ga kpanlogo style, a modernized traditional dance and music form, developed around 1960. Yacub Addy, Obo Addy, and Mustapha Tettey Addy are Ga drummers who have achieved international fame. A huge log xylophone is used in asonko music. The 10–14 string Ghanaian seprewa, midway between the kora and the African harp, is still played but often replaced by guitar. Other styles include; adaha, agbadza, akwete, ashiko and gombe as well as konkomba, mainline, osibisaba and sikyi. Instrumentation includes the aburukawa, apentemma, dawuro and torowa.

Complex polyphonic structures of Baoule singers intoned by Djourou harp.

- Ewe music, the music of the Ewe people of Ghana, Togo and Benin, is primarily percussive with great metrical complexity. Ewe drumming ensembles produce dance music and have contributed popular styles such as agbadza and borborbor, a konkomba/highlife fusion of the 1950s.
- The related Aja people are native to south-western Benin and south-eastern Togo. Aja living in Abomey mingled with the local tribe, thus creating the Fon or Dahomey ethnic group, now the largest in Benin. Tchinkoumé.
- Yoruba music is prominent in the music of Nigeria and in Afro-Latin and Caribbean musical styles. Ensembles using the talking drum play a type of music that is called dundun after the drum, using various sizes of tension drum along with special band drums (ogido). The leader or oniyalu uses the drum to "talk" by imitating the tonality of Yoruba language. Yoruba music traditionally centred on folklore and spiritual/deity worship, utilising basic and natural instruments such as handclaps. Professional musicians were referred to by the derogatory term of Alagbe.

Complex polyrhythms performed by Igbo musicians in Nsukka, Nigeria.

- Igbo music informs Highlife and Waka. The drum is the most important musical instrument for the Igbo people, used during celebrations, rites of passage, funerals, war, town meetings and other events, and the pot-drum or udu (means "pot") is their most common and popular drum: a smaller variant is called the kim-kim. Igbo Styles include egwu ota. Other instruments: obo – ufie – ogene, a flat metal pan used as a bell.
- Bassa people (Cameroon) originated assiko, a popular dance from the South of Cameroon.
- The Kasena use a hocket vocal style. Other styles are; jongo, len yoro. Instruments include; gullu, gungonga, korbala, kornia, sinyegule, wua and yong wui.
- A Bamileke style is mangambe; Bamileke people use the gong.
- The Beti-Pahuin of Cameroon Style = bikutsi; Dance = bikutsi; Instrumentation = njang – rattle include Fang people chorus and drum group; Instrumentation = mvet; Other = bebom-mvet. Music of São Tomé and Principe Styles: danço-Congo – dêxa – socopé – ússua – xtléva; Instruments: cowbell – flute – rattle; Other: Tchiloli

The music of Cape Verde has long been influenced by Europe, Instrumentation includes the accordion (gaita), the bowed rabeca, the violão guitar and the viola twelve string guitar as well as cavaquinho, cimboa and ferrinho. Styles include batuque, coladera, funaná, morna and tabanca.

== Central Africa ==
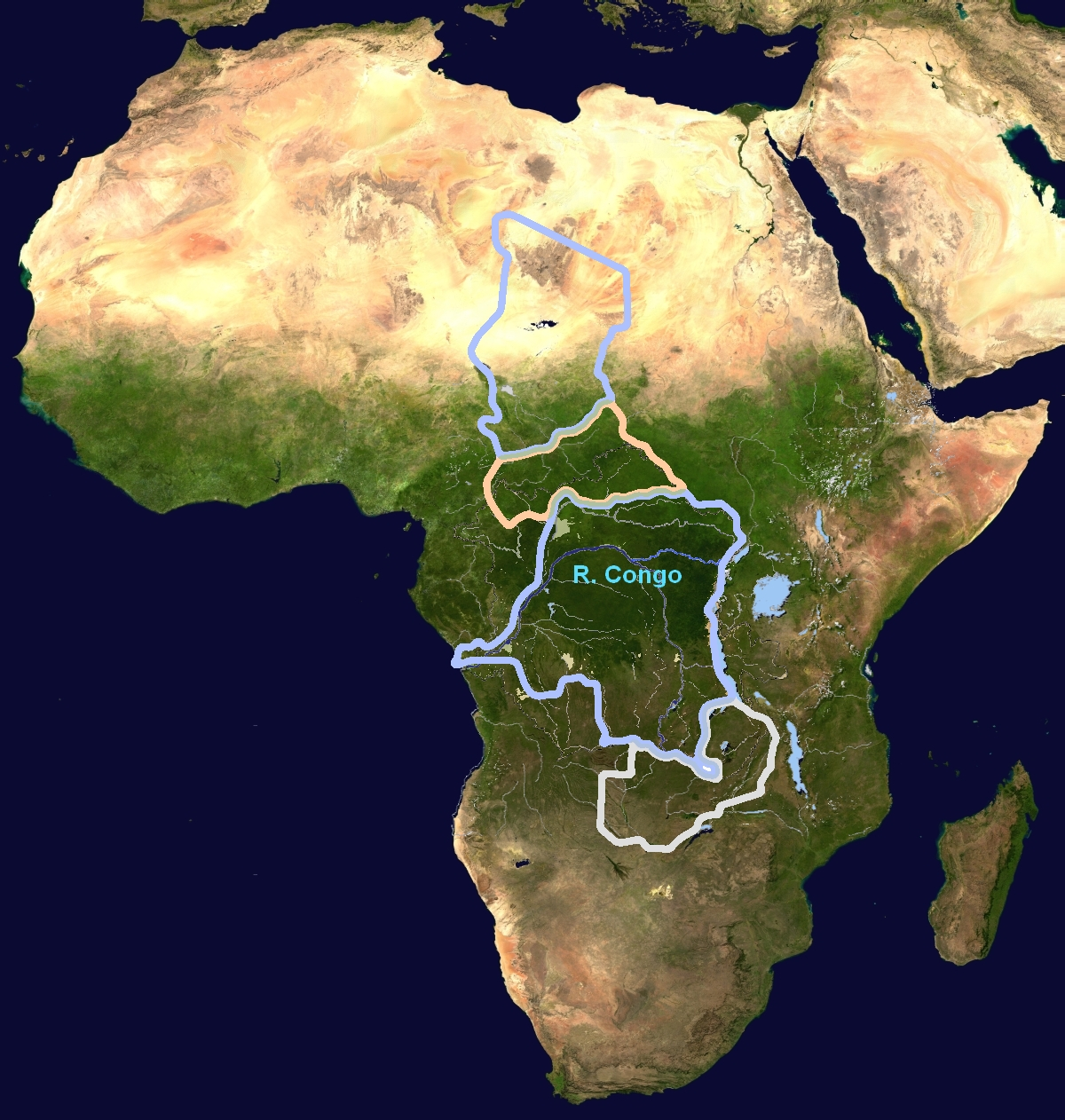
The Central African musicological region and the River Congo upon a satellite photograph showing the African tropical rainforest and desert regions

The central region of African music is defined by the tropical rain-forests at the heart of the continent. However Chad, the northernmost state, has a considerable subtropical and desert northern region.

=== Northern traditions ===
Early kingdoms were founded near Lake Chad: the Kanem Empire, ca. 600 BCE – 1380 CE encompassed much of Chad, Fezzan, east Niger and north-east Nigeria, perhaps founded by the nomadic Zaghawa, then ruled by the Sayfawa dynasty. The Bornu Empire (1396–1893) was a continuation, the Kanembu founding a new state at Ngazargamu. These spoke the Kanuri languages spoken by some four million people in Nigeria, Niger, Chad, Cameroon, Libya and Sudan. They are noted for lute and drum music. The Kingdom of Baguirmi (1522–1897) and the Ouaddai Empire (1635–1912) were also centred near Lake Chad.

- The Toubou, who live mainly in the north of Chad around the Tibesti Mountains and also in Libya, Niger and Sudan, are semi-nomadic herders, Nilo-Saharan speakers, mostly Muslim, numbering roughly 350,000. Their folk music revolves around men's string instruments like the keleli and women's vocal music.
- The Central Sudanic Baguirmi language has 44,761 speakers As of 1993 and is associated with the kingdom of Baguirmi. They are known for drum and zither music and a folk dance in which a mock battle is conducted between dancers wielding large pestles. The Sara people are a linguistically related ethnic group, the largest in Chad, making up to 30% of its population and 10% of the Central African Republic. Descendants of the Sao civilisation, they use the balafon, whistle, harp and kodjo drums.
- The Zande people live in the north-east of the Democratic Republic of the Congo, south-western Sudan and the south-eastern Central African Republic. Their number is estimated by various sources at between 1 and 4 million.
- Horns and trumpets such as the long royal trumpet, a tin horn known as waza or kakaki are used in coronations and other upper-class ceremonies throughout both Chad and Sudan. Other traditional Chadian instruments include the hu hu (string instrument with calabash resonators), maracas. The griot tradition uses the kinde (a five-string bow harp).

=== The Pygmy people ===
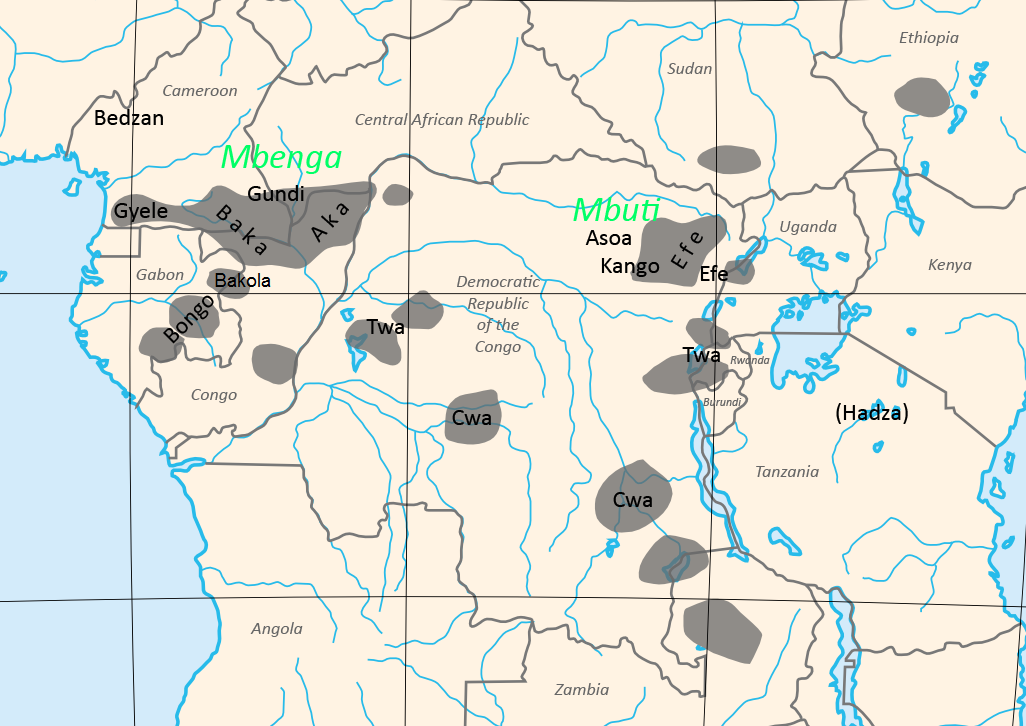
Distribution of Pygmies according to Cavalli-Sforza

- The Pygmy peoples have high levels of genetic diversity, yet are extremely divergent from all other human populations, suggesting they have an ancient indigenous lineage, the most ancient divergence after the Southern African Bushmen. It is estimated that there are between 250,000 and 600,000 Pygmies living in the Congo rainforest, Most Pygmy communities dwell in tropical forests. with populations in Rwanda, Burundi, Uganda, the Democratic Republic of the Congo, the Central African Republic, Cameroon, Equatorial Guinea, Gabon, the Republic of Congo, Angola, Botswana, Namibia, and Zambia. As partial hunter-gatherers, living partially but not exclusively on the wild products of their environment, they trade with neighbouring farmers to acquire cultivated foods and other material items. There are several Pygmy groups, the best known being the Mbenga (Aka and Baka) of the western Congo Basin, the Mbuti (Efe etc.) of the Ituri Rainforest, and the Twa of the Great Lakes. Pygmy music Includes the Aka, Baka, Mambuti Mbuti and Efé; styles: hindewhu – hocket – likanos – liquindi – lullaby – yelli. Instrumentation = flute – ieta – limbindi – molimo – ngombi – trumpet – whistle. Other = boona – elima – jengi – molimo The African Pygmies are particularly known for their usually vocal music, typically characterised by dense contrapuntal communal improvisation. Music permeates daily life and there are songs for entertainment as well as specific events and activities.
- Bashi Instrumentation = lulanga.

=== Bantu traditions ===
- Bemba people of Zambia. (or 'BaBemba' using the Ba- prefix to mean 'people of', and also called 'Awemba' or 'BaWemba' in the past) belong to a large group of peoples mainly in the Northern, Luapula and Copperbelt Provinces of Zambia who trace their origins to the Luba and Lunda states of the upper Congo basin, in what became Katanga Province in southern Congo-Kinshasa (DRC). There are over 30 Bemba clans, named after animals or natural organisms, such as the royal clan, "the people of the crocodile" (Bena Ng'andu) or the Bena Bowa (Mushroom Clan). The Bemba language (Chibemba) is related to the Bantu languages Kaonde (in Zambia and the DRC), Luba (in the DRC), Nsenga and Tonga (in Zambia), and Nyanja/Chewa (in Zambia and Malawi). It is mainly spoken in the Northern, Luapula and Copperbelt Provinces, and has become the most widely spoken African language in the country, although not always as a first language. Bemba numbered 250,000 in 1963 but a much larger population includes some 'eighteen different ethnic groups' who, together with the Bemba, form a closely related ethno-linguistic cluster of matrilineal-matrifocal agriculturalists known as the Bemba-speaking peoples of Zambia. Instrumentation = babatone – kalela

== East Africa ==
The East African musicological region, which includes the islands of the Indian Ocean, Madagascar, Réunion, Mauritius, Comor and the Seychelles, has been open to the influence of Arabian and Iranian music since the Shirazi Era. In the south of the region Swahili culture has adopted instruments such as the dumbek, oud and qanun – even the Indian tabla drums. The kabosy, also called the mandoliny, a small guitar of Madagascar, like the Comorian gabusi, may take its name from the Arabian qanbūs. Taarab, a modern genre popular in Tanzania and Kenya, is said to take both its name and its style from Egyptian music as formerly cultivated in Zanzibar. Latterly there have been European influences also: the guitar is popular in Kenya, the contredanse, mazurka and polka are danced in the Seychelles.

=== Northern traditions ===
- The Luo peoples inhabit an area that stretches from Southern Sudan and Ethiopia through northern Uganda and eastern Congo (DRC), into western Kenya and Tanzania and include the Shilluk, Acholi, Lango and Joluo (Kenyan and Tanzanian Luo). Luo Benga music derives from the traditional music of the nyatiti lyre: the Luo-speaking Acholi of northern Uganda use the adungu. Rhythms are characterized by syncopation and acrusis. Melodies are lyrical, with vocal ornamentations, especially when the music carries an important message. Songs are call-and-response or solo performances such as chants, recitatives with irregular rhythms and phrases which carried serious messages. Luo dances such as the dudu were introduced by them. A unique characteristic is the introduction of another chant at the middle of a musical performance. The singing stops, the pitch of the musical instruments go down and the dance becomes less vigorous as an individual takes up the performance in self-praise. This is called pakruok. A unique kind of ululation, sigalagala, mainly done by women, marks the climax of the musical performance. Dance styles are elegant and graceful, involving the movement of one leg in the opposite direction to the waist or vigorous shaking of the shoulders, usually to the nyatiti. Adamson (1967) commented that Luos clad in their traditional costumes and ornaments deserve their reputation as the most picturesque people in Kenya. During most of their performances the Luo wore costumes; sisal skirts (owalo), beads (Ombulu / tigo) worn around the neck and waist and red or white clay used by the ladies. The men's costumes included kuodi or chieno, a skin worn from the shoulders or from the waist. Ligisa headgear, shield and spear, reed hats and clubs were made from locally available materials. Luo musical instruments range from percussion (drums, clappers, metal rings, ongeng'o or gara, shakers), nyatiti, a type of lyre; orutu, a type of fiddle), wind (tung' a horn, Asili, a flute, Abu-!, to a specific type of trumpet. In the benga style of music. the guitar (acoustic, later electric) replaced the nyatiti as the string instrument. Benga is played by musicians of many tribes and is no longer considered a purely Luo style.
- The Music and dance of the Maasai people used no instruments in the past because as semi-nomadic Nilotic pastoralists instruments were considered too cumbersome to move. Traditional Maasai music is strictly polyphonic vocal music, a group chanting polyphonic rhythms while soloists take turns singing verses. The call and response that follows each verse is called namba. Performances are often competitive and divided by age and gender. The neighbouring Turkana people have maintained their ancient traditions, including call and response music, which is almost entirely vocal. A horn made from the kudu antelope is also played. The Samburu are related to the Maasai, and like them, play almost no instruments except simple pipes and a kind of guitar. There are also erotic songs sung by women praying for rain.
- The Borana live near the Ethiopian border, and their music reflects Ethiopian, Somali and other traditions. They are known also for using the chamonge guitar, which is made from a cooking pot strung with metal wires.

=== Bantu traditions ===
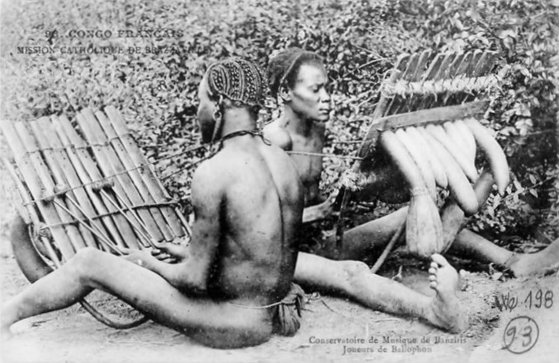
Ngbaka-speaking Gbanzili men of the rainforest play xylophones with calabash resonators, 1907.

Drums (ngoma, ng'oma or ingoma) are much used: particularly large ones have been developed among the court musicians of East African kings. The term ngoma is applied to rhythm and dance styles as well as the drums themselves. as among the East Kenyan Akamba, the Baganda of Uganda, and the Ngoni people of Malawi, Mozambique, Tanzania and Zambia, who trace their origins to the Zulu people of kwaZulu-Natal in South Africa. The term is also used by the Tutsi/Watusi and Hutu/Bahutu. Bantu style drums, especially the sukuti drums, are played by the Luhya people (also known as Avaluhya, Abaluhya or Luyia), a Bantu people of Kenya, being about 16% of Kenya's total population of 38.5 million, and in Uganda and Tanzania. They number about 6.1 million people. Abaluhya litungo.

- The Kikuyu are one of the largest and most urbanized communities in Kenya. At the Riuki cultural center in Nairobi traditional songs and dances are still performed by local women, including music for initiations, courting, weddings, hunting, and working. The Kikuyu, like their neighbours the Embu and the Meru are believed to have migrated from the Congo Basin. Meru people like the Chuka, who live near Mount Kenya, are known for polyrhythmic percussion music.
- The Baganda are a large southern Ugandan population with well-documented musical traditions. The akadinda, a xylophone, as well as several types of drum, is used in the courtly music of the Kabaka or king. Much of the music is based on playing interlocking ostinato phrases in parallel octaves. Other instruments; engelabi, ennanga or (inanga, a harp), entenga. Dance – baksimba.
- The music of Rwanda and Burundi is mainly that of the closely related Tutsi/Watusi and Hutu/Bahutu people. The Royal Drummers of Burundi perform music for ceremonies of birth, funeral and coronation of mwami (kings). Sacred drums (called karyenda) are made from hollowed tree trunks covered with animal skins. In addition to the central drum, Inkiranya, the Amashako drums provide a continuous beat and Ibishikiso drums follow the rhythm established by the Inkiranya. Dancers may carry ornamental spears and shields and lead the procession with their dance. Instrumentation; ikembe – inanga – iningiri – umuduri – ikondera – ihembe – urutaro. Dances: ikinimba – umushayayo – umuhamirizo – imparamba – inkaranka – igishakamba – ikinyemera
- Swahili culture: Styles gungu – kinanda – wedding music Dances chakacha – kumbwaya – vugo, Instrumentation kibangala – rika – taishokoto
- The ng'oma drumming of Gogo women of Tanzania and Mozambique, like that of the ngwayi dance of northeastern Zambia, uses "interlocking" or antiphonal rhythms that feature in many Eastern African instrumental styles such as the xylophone music of the Makonde dimbila, the Yao mangolongondo or the Shirima mangwilo, on which the opachera, the initial caller, is responded to by another player, the wakulela.
- The Chopi people of the coastal Inhambane Province are known for a unique kind of xylophone called mbila (pl: timbila) and the style of music played with it, which "is believed to be the most sophisticated method of composition yet found among preliterate peoples." Ensembles consist of around ten xylophones of four sizes and accompany ceremonial dances with long compositions called ngomi which consist of an overture and ten movements of different tempos and styles. The ensemble leader serves as poet, composer, conductor, and performer, creating a text, improvising a melody partially based on the features of the Chopi's tone language, and composing a second countrapuntal line. The musicians of the ensemble partially improvise their parts according to style, instrumental idiom, and the leader's indications. The composer then consults with the choreographer of the ceremony and adjustments are made. Chopi styles: timbala. Instruments: kalimba – mbila – timbila – valimba – xigovia – xipala-pala – xipendane – xitende – xizambe Chopi languages include Tonga. Tonga dance = mganda
- The Kamba people are known for their complex percussion music and spectacular performances, dances that display athletic skills resemble those of the Tutsi and the Embu. Dances are usually accompanied by songs composed for the occasion and sung on a pentatonic scale. The Akamba also have work songs. Their music is divided into several groups based on age: Kilumi is a dance for mainly elderly women and men performed at healing and rain-making ceremonies, Mbeni for young and acrobatic girls and boys, Mbalya or Ngutha is a dance for young people who meet to entertain themselves after the day's chores are done, Kyaa for the old men and women.Kiveve, Kinze etc. In the Kilumi dance the drummer, usually female, plays sitting on a large mwase drum covered with goatskin at one end and open at the other. The drummer is also the lead singer. Mwali (pl: Myali) is a dance accompanying a song usually made to criticize anti-social behaviour: Mwilu is a circumcision dance.
- The Gusii people use an enormous lute called the obokano and the ground bow, made by digging a large hole in the ground, over which an animal skin is pegged. A small hole is cut into the skin and a single string placed across the hole.
- The Mijikenda (literally "the nine tribes") are found on the coast of Tanzania, Kenya and Southern Somalia. They have a vibrant folk tradition perhaps due to less influence from Christian missionaries. Their music is mostly percussion-based and extremely complex. Taarab is a mixture of influences from Arabic, Indian and Mijikenda music found in the coastal regions of Kenya, Zanzibar, Pemba and the islands off East Africa.
- Yao people (East Africa) dance = beni (music) – likwata

=== The Indian Ocean ===
- The Bajuni people live primarily in the Lamu islands and also in Mombasa and Kilifi. The Bajuni women's work song "Mashindano Ni Matezo" is very well known.
- Madagascar and the Mascarene Islands, which include Réunion, Mauritius and Rodrigues are noted for the dance/music style sega. Mascarene also maloya music – maloya (ritual). Instrumentation kayamb – maravanne – ravanne – tambour. Madagascar also vakodrazana style, dance basese – salegy – sigaoma – tsapika – watsa watsa. Instrumentation jejy voatavo – kabosy – lokanga – marovany – sodina – valiha. Famadihana ritual, hiragasy theater. Seychellois dance contonbley.

== Southern Africa ==
- Bushmen Also Basarwa, Khoe, Khwe, San, !Kung. The Khoisan (also spelled Khoesaan, Khoesan or Khoe-San) is a unifying name for two ethnic groups of Southern Africa who share physical and putative linguistic characteristics distinct from the Bantu majority of the region, the foraging San and the pastoral Khoi. The San include the original inhabitants of Southern Africa before the southward Bantu migrations from Central and East Africa reached their region. Khoi pastoralists apparently arrived in Southern Africa shortly before the Bantu. Large Khoi-san populations remain in several arid areas in the region, notably in the Kalahari Desert. Styles= hocket

Song of Lamentation from Mozambique

The Southern Bantu languages include all of the important Bantu languages of South Africa, Zimbabwe and Botswana, and several of southern Mozambique. They have several sub-groups;

- Nguni languages include Xhosa, Zulu and Northern Ndebele. Zulu music has contributed the Mbaqanga style to African popular music as well as the polyphonic vocal styles called mbube and isicathamiya. Also izihlabo – maskanda Instruments: guitar Other = ukubonga. Xhosa music made an international impression in the jazz world through Miriam Makeba and others, for example, Mike Oldfield's Amarok includes some Xhosa tunes and vocal lyrics. Instruments: uhadi. Ndbele Instrumentation: guitar Other: bira ceremony Tekela languages: Swati, Phuthi, Southern Ndebele.
- Sotho music style: mohabelo Sotho: Birwa, Northern Sotho (Pedi), Southern Sotho (Sotho), Lozi. Sotho–Tswana languages; Tswana, Tswapong, Kgalagadi.
- Shona music also Tsonga. Instruments: hosho – kalimba – matepe – mbira – ngoma drums – njari – panpipe Other: bira ceremony – kushaura-kutsinhira Shona languages include Shona proper, Dema, Kalanga, Manyika, Ndau, Nambya, Tawara, Tewe. Tswa–Ronga languages: Ronga, Tswa, Gwamba, Tsonga, Venda.
- The Ovambo people number roughly 1,500,000 and consist of a number of kindred groups that inhabit Ovamboland in northern Namibia, forming about half of that state's population, as well as the southernmost Angolan province. Shambo, a traditional dance music, blended Ovambo music previously popularised by folk guitarist Kwela, Kangwe Keenyala, Boetie Simon, Lexington and Meme Nanghili na Shima with a dominant guitar, rhythm guitar, percussion and a heavy "talking" bassline. The Herero, with about 240,000 members, mostly in Namibia, the remainder living in Botswana and Angola speak a similar language, as do the Himba people. Herero people oviritje, also known as konsert, has become popular in Namibia. The Damara are genetically Bantu but speak the "click" language of the bushmen. Ma/gaisa or Damara Punch is a popular dance music genre that derives from their traditional music.
- Pedi styles = harepa, Instrumentation = harepa

== Instruments ==
- Aburukuwa
- Atoke
- Brekete – used especially by the Gorovodu, a vodun order of the Anlo and Ewe people.
- Axatse – a rattle or idiophone.
- Fontomfrom – the royal talking drum of the Bono people.
- Kaganu – a narrow drum or membranophone.
- Kidi – a drum about two feet tall
- Kora (instrument) – a 21 string double harp-lute
- Kloboto
- Kpanlogo
- Prempensua – large thumb piano.
- Totodzi
- Seprewa – 6–10 stringed harp of the Akan and Fante peoples of south and central Ghana, used in an old genre of praise music.
- Sogo – the largest of the supporting drums used to play in Atsiã
- Lobi xylophone.
- Goun kakagbo – hongan
- Calabash – A dried calabash bowl turned upside down and hit with the fist and fingers wearing rings. Used as accompaniment to melodic instruments
- Flutes
- Goonji/Gonjey/Goge – Traditional one stringed-fiddle played by a majority of other sahelian groups in West Africa.
- Gungon – Bass snare drum of the Lunsi ensemble. Of northern origin, it is played throughout Ghana by various groups, known by southern groups as brekete. Related to the Dunun drums of other West African peoples.
- Gyil – large resonant Xylophones, related to the Balafon.
- Mbira – small pentatonic thumb piano.
- Koloko – Varieties of Sahelian lute. Varieties include the one-stringed 'Kolgo/Koliko' of Gur-speaking groups, the two-stringed 'Molo' of the Zabarma and Fulani minorities, or the two-stringed 'Gurumi' of the Hausa.
- Lunna/Kalangu – Varieties of Hourglass-shaped Talking drums.
- Musical bow – known as 'Jinjeram' (in Gurunsi) or Jinjeli (in Mossi-Dagomba languages).
- Shekere
- Whistles
- Horns
- Lemba people Instrumentation: mbira
- Yombe people Instrumentation: panpipe
- Shangaan Instrument: guitar
- Venda Instruments: ngoma drums – panpipe
- Comorian msondo – ndzendze.
- Zaramo dance/instrument msondo – also ngoma.
- Lango okeme.
- Busoga panpipe

== African dances ==
=== West ===
Gerewol. Dan people masked dance. Yoruba gelede. Hausa asauwara Ewe dances: agbadza – Gadzo. Mande include the Mandinka, Maninka and Bamana Dances: bansango – didadi – dimba – sogominkum. Dagomba dance: takai – damba – jera – simpa – bamaya – tora – geena. São Tomé and Principe dance: danço-Congo – puíta – ússua. Cape Verde Dance = batuque – coladera – funaná – morna – tabanca. Kasena Dances: jongo – nagila – pe zara – war dance. Akan dances: adowa – osibisaba – sikyi. The Ashanti Nzema people dance: abissa – fanfare – grolo – sidder

=== Southern ===
- Chewa people Dance = gule wa mkulu – nyau
- Lomwe dance = tchopa
- Luvale dance = manchancha
- Nyanja dance = chitsukulumwe – gule wa mkulu likhuba
- Tumbuka dance = vimbuza
- Kaondedance kachacha
- Henga dance = vimbuza
