= Music of Chad =

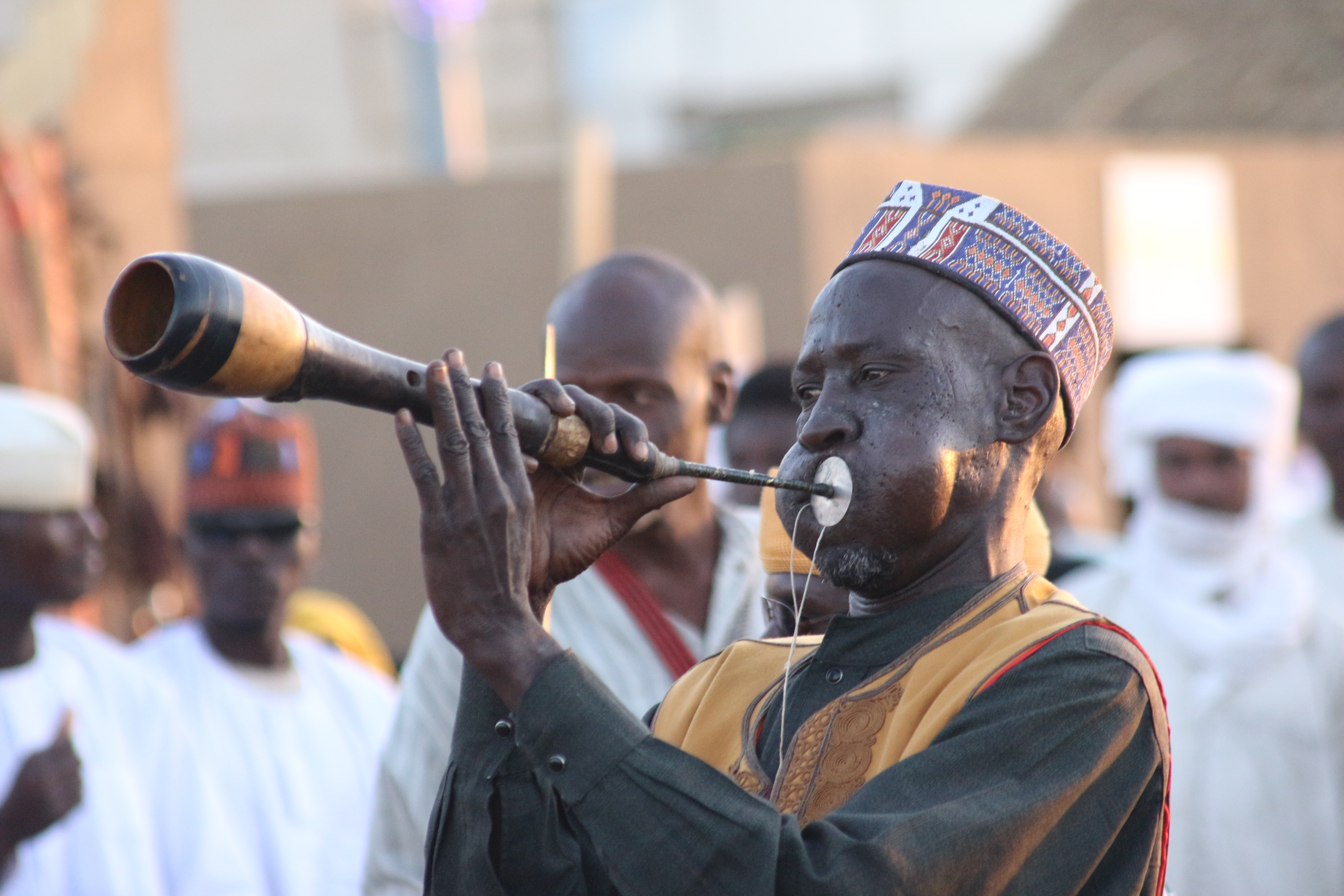
Kanem wind instrument player during the 2nd edition of the Dary Festival in Chad.

Chad is an ethnically diverse Central African country. Each of its regions has its own unique varieties of music and dance. The punani, for example, use single-reed flutes, while the ancient griot tradition uses five-string kinde and various kinds of horns, and the Tibesti region uses lutes and fiddles. Musical ensembles playing horns and trumpets such as the long royal trumpets known as "waza" or "kakaki" are used in coronations and other upper-class ceremonies throughout Chad and Sudan.

The national anthem of Chad is "La Tchadienne," written in 1960 by Paul Villard and Louis Gidrol with help from Gidrol's student group.

== Popular music ==
Following independence, Chad, like most other African countries, quickly began producing some popular music, primarily in a style similar to the soukous music of the Democratic Republic of the Congo. Styles of Chadian popular music include sai, which used rhythms from the southern part of Chad—this style was popularized by a group called Tibesti. Other bands include the Sahel's International Challal and African Melody, while musicians include the Sudanese-music-influenced guitarist Ahmed Pecos and Chadian-French musician Clément Masdongar.

== Folk music ==
=== Teda music ===
The Teda live in the area around the Tibesti Mountains. Their folk music revolves around men's string instruments and women's vocal music. String instruments like the keleli are used to "speak for" male performers, since it is considered inappropriate for a man to sing in front of an adult woman.

=== Instruments ===
Traditional Chadian instruments include the hu hu (string instrument with a calabash resonator), kakaki (a tin horn), maracas, lute, kinde (a bow harp) and various kinds of horns. Other instruments include the flute and drum music of the Kanembu and the balaphone, whistle, harp and kodjo drums of the Sara people, while the Baguirmians are known for drum and zither music, as well as a folk dance in which a mock battle is conducted between dancers wielding large pestles.

== See also ==
- Chari Jazz (1960s Chadian band)
