= 2025 Togolese Gen Z protests =

Anti-government civil unrest in Togo

2025 Togolese Gen Z Anti-Gnassingbé protests
- Part of Gen Z protests
- Date: 5 June 2025 – December 8, 2025 (6 Months and 3 Days)
- Location: Togo
- Caused by: Arrest of the rapper Aamron; Unwanted constitutional reforms; Youth unemployment; Lack of democratic participation; Bad living conditions
- Goals: Fall of the Gnassingbé-led government; Elimination of the limitless term; Lower electricity prices; Further democratic reforms
- Result: Protests failed
- Concessions: Lowered prices for electricity

Parties
Civic organizations: June 6 Movement; Hands Off My Constitution; Let's Save Togo; Front Citoyen; Togo Debout; Novation Internationale; Tournons La Page movement; Supported by Forces démocratiques pour la République	Government of Togo; Togolese Armed Forces; Ministry of Security and Civil Protection; Central Service for Criminal Investigations; Supported by ECOWAS

Lead figures
Aamron; Essozimna Marguerite Gnakade; Kafui Adjamagbo-Johnson	Faure Gnassingbé

Casualties and losses
At least 302–316 arrests At least 100 injured people At least 14 dead people	

The 2025 Togolese Gen-Z Anti-Gnassingbé protests are a series of protests against the President of Togo, President Faure Gnassingbé, his continued government, the arrest of the rapper Aamron and the constitutional amendments of 2024. The protest is mostly led by the younger generations, most notably Generation Z and Generation Alpha (with the youngest recorded deaths as of yet being a 13 and 15 years old), thus making it part of the wider trend of the Gen Z protests.

== Background ==
In 2024 and early 2025 the Togolese government introduced a new constitutional change: they aimed to convert the presidential system into a parliamentary or semi‑parliamentary system, creating the role of “President of the Council of Ministers”, which was then given to Faure Gnassingbè in May 2025. That new role reportedly has no term limits, and allows the former president to remain in power indefinitely via parliamentary re‑election, rather than direct presidential elections. Critics were quick to call it a “constitutional coup”, and so were multiple people who took it to the streets.

Other factors that contributed to the protests were the energy cost spike, miserable living conditions, high youth unemployment, the sense that the government is failing to deliver basic services and a feel of being marginalized and disconnected from political power.

Online dissent had been shown as early as April 2025.

== Events ==
Aamron, a Togolese rapper, was arrested alongside another 34 young people. The officials beat him with ropes and slapped him continuously, accusing him of having incited an anti-government demonstration in the past. After his arrest, there were various protests held on 5 June 2025, which lasted up to 6 June 2025, and led to the Togolese armed forces reacting in a significantly aggressive manner, leading to the death of at least seven people. This was the first instance of public insurgency within this wave of protests. One day later, the rapper was released after being tortured for an entire day whilst being filmed. 80 additional people were arrested by the end of the protests.

As time passed by, youth and civil society organizations (especially the "Hands off my Constitution" Movement) started to prepare an organized protest within Lomé. They ultimately organized a protest that would start on June 26, and would eventually end on June 28. The protesters blocked roads, set up concrete block barricades, businesses remained closed, people burned tyres and threw projectiles at security forces.

Military jeeps were deployed as reinforcements in some areas and at least 10 people were arrested. Allegedly, the Togolese armed forces performed arbitrary arrests, beating civilians with batons and ropes, stole property and destroyed private property. 7 people were reported dead, including some minors (the youngest of which were a 15 years old and a 13 years old). Due to the role of the internet in gathering support for the demonstrations, Togo tightened restrictions on the internet and various social medias.

The Togolese government later stated that the surge in protests was tied to the increase in "misinformation" and "troublemakers" within the nation, justifying the change in policy towards social medias. On 1 July ECOWAS called for restraint on all sides, but stated their support for Togo, claiming that they "remained available to contribute to efforts to preserve social peace in the Togolese Republic".

On 10 July 2025, it was confirmed that at least 100 people had been arrested during protests.

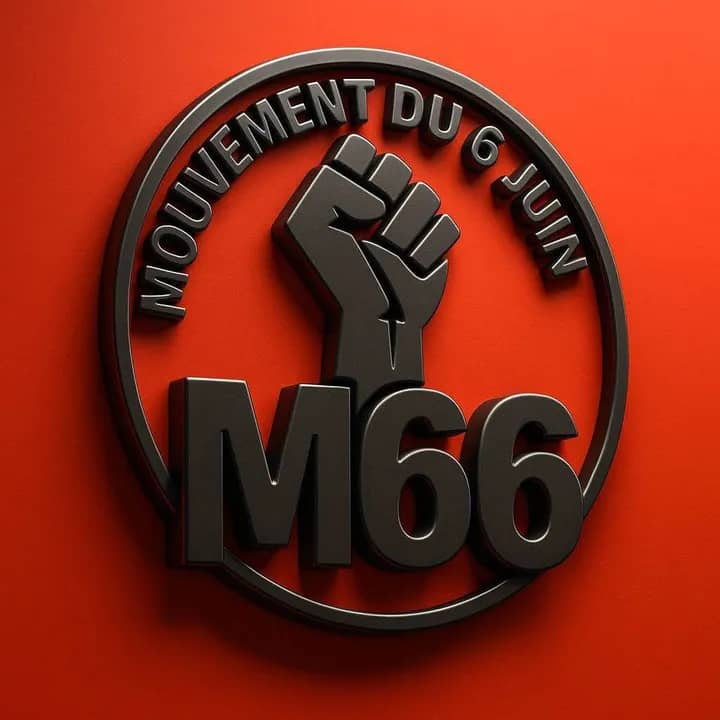
Logo of the M 6.6

In July 2025, the "June 6 Movement (M 6.6)", created after the protests between 5–6 June, announced they were going to initiate another protest on 16 and 17 July 2025. The date had been chosen to disturb the 2025 Togo local elections. The government, in response, arrested numerous prominent members of the group as to prevent the protest from happening. On 16–17 July, people seem to have taken to the street despite the repression. The subsequent election had a significantly low turnout, some suggesting it was part of the boycott organized by the M 6.6.

Another protest took place between 21 and 22 August 2025. 100 people were injured and 125 arrested according to the Let's Save Togo coalition, but according to the Togolese Ministry of Security and Civil Protection, there were only 119 arrests. 111 people were released from prison a few days after the protests, with an estimated 8 to 14 people still being kept behind bars, having been allegedly found with knives before their arrest. On 22 August, in a separate incident, two young members of the Tournons La Page movement were arrested despite not taking part in the protest and were brought to the Central Service for Criminal Investigations.

By August 2025, the M 6.6 had grown in size and prominence, becoming a broader civic movement. Other groups started to pop up in support of M 6.6, Let's Save Togo and Hands off my Constitution, such as: Front Citoyen, Togo Debout and Novation Internationale. These organizations jointly announced another protest to be held on 30 August, named "Dead Togo". The protest aimed at specifically denounce the rising cost of living and the constitutional reform. The protest on 30 August was repressed violently. Amongst those protesting was the rapper Aamron and ex-defence minister Essozimna Marguerite Gnakade, who were among those forcefully displaced upon the start of the protest and forced to go back home by security forces. Meanwhile, Kafui Adjamagbo-Johnson, who also expressed her will to participate, was not allowed to leave as the security forces surrounded her house and threatened her if she left.

During September 2025, opposition to the government moved from public spaces to forums and social medias despite censorship, with many from the Togolese diaspora inciting local protesters to continue to manifest their dissent against the government and to continue to organize.

On 10 September 2025 the Togolese government attempted to appease the public in hopes to stop the protests. They lowered the price of electricity, announcing that they were planning to create a major power grid by 2030 to give universal access to electricity to everyone within the nation. However, dissent continued.

On 17 September 2025, Marguerite Gnakadé was arrested on charges including "incitement to revolt" and also "aggravated public disorder". A few days later, on 19 September 2025, outspoken rapper Aamron was arrested once more before being released once again the day after under judicial supervision. In an interview done by CIVICUS to one of the protestors (who decided to remain anonymous) it was stated that the "revolution" was not over and that future demonstration of dissent would continue, regardless of arrests.

After posting an anti-government video on her social, activist Grâce Koumayi Biyoki was arrested on 3 October 2025, with the accusation of undermining state security. Following this, and the great mobilization seen on the internet which started in September 2025, Talaka Mawama announced further restrictions on the internet, and threatened further future arrests.

After months of silence, M66 announced in November 2025 a major demonstration to be held on 8 December 2025, coinciding with the anniversary of the 9th Pan-African Congress in Lomé. The mobilization was announced of peaceful intentions, and through the use of X, TikTok, Facebook, and WhatsApp. On 7 December 2025, DMK, APD, Democratic Convention of African Peoples, PADET, the Front Touche Pas A Ma Constitution, LDP and Dynamic for the Majority of the People denounced the government's infringement of human rights and supported actions to put a stop to such infringements. The calls for mobilization were taken very seriously by the Togolese government, which deployed a considerable number of police officials and the army as to prevent any kind of gathering, with locals stating that the city was more silent and empty then usual. Governative news outlets mocked the event and called the mobilization a "flop", as no gathering or protests effectively took place. The lack of mobilization was tied to a loss of momentum of the protests, especially those tied to M66. Le Monde stated that the recent oppressive measures by the Togolese government had "finally thwarted the mobilization of the Togolese people".

== See also ==
- Protests against Faure Gnassingbé
