= Music of Benin =

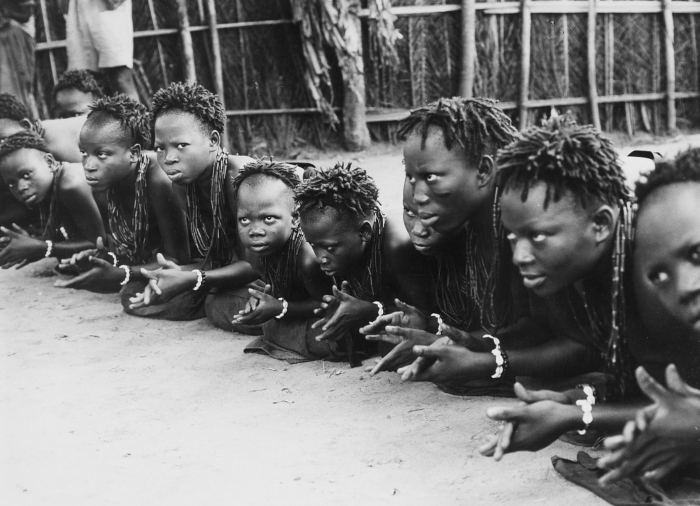
Dance of greeting, Benin, taken before 1969

Benin has played an important role in the African music scene, producing one of the biggest stars to come out of the continent in Angélique Kidjo. Post-independence, the country was home to a vibrant and innovative music scene, where native folk music combined with Ghanaian highlife, French cabaret, American rock, funk and soul, and Congolese rumba. It also has a rich variety of ethnomusicological traditions.

== National music ==
The national anthem of Benin, adopted upon independence in 1960, is "L'Aube Nouvelle" (The New Dawn) by Gilbert Jean Dagnon. The Gangbe brass band is an internationally prominent Beninese ensemble.

== Traditional music ==
The majority of Benin’s 15.17 million people live in the south. The population includes about 42 ethnic groups overall. These include coastal populations of Yoruba in the southeast, who migrated from what is now Nigeria in the 12th century, the Fon in the south central area around Abomey, Mina, Xueda and Aja who came from what is now Togo.

Northern peoples include the Dendi in the north-central area, who came from what is now Mali in the 16th century, the Bariba and Fula people in the northeast and the Betammaribe and Somba in the Atacora Range.

== Popular music ==
In 1972, the Kérékou government came to power and instituted curfews and other measures that inhibited musical expression. Kérékou encouraged indigenous folk music. Some musicians, like Tohon Stan, adapted folk styles for mainstream audiences at home and abroad, including tchinkoumé, a funeral music played using water percussion which was adapted into tchink-system music. Sagbohan Danialou, a multi-instrumentalist from Porto-Novo, is another very influential musician who transformed traditional Vodou religious rhythms such as kakagbo into popular music.

Ignacio Blazio Osho was perhaps the most influential musician of the post-independence period, alongside Pedro Gnonnas y sus Panchos, Les Volcans and Picoby Band d'Abomey. Pedro produced the song Feso Jaiye, which became a hit and was performed by many bands at the 2nd All-Africa Games in 1973.

Nel Oliver debuted in France in 1976, borrowing elements from all over Africa and the United States to create "Afro-akpala-funk".

The “Tout Puissant” Orchestre Poly-Rythmo are still a recognized in Cotonou and one of Africa's group with the largest discographies, with over 50 LPs, hundreds of 45s and CD re-issues of their work. They have toured both Europe and the United States. According to a concert review in the New York Times, "the band belongs on the very short list of the world's greatest funk bands."

Beninese guitarist Lionel Loueke is one of the most important musicians in jazz, infusing African influences. Loueke currently lives in New York and is a member of Herbie Hancock's band.

Wilfrid Houwanou is a Beninese singer-songwriter who goes by the stage name “ROBBI” (formerly Robbi Slo).

Zeynab Ouloukèmi Habib, born in Abidjan in 1975, has given concerts around Africa and won a Kora Award for Best Female West African Artist in 2005. She released her first album Intori in 2001, a second album D'un endroit à l'autre in 2004, and a third album Olukèmi in 2011.

Gangbé Brass Band, from Cotonou continued the trajectory of transforming traditional Vodou music, combining it with jazz and brass band traditions. Gangbe has released four albums: Gangbe (1998), Togbe (2001), Whendo (2004) and Assiko (2008), and tours extensively in Europe and North America.

The last few decades of the 20th century saw numerous other developments, including the rise of reggae brought from Jamaica by Yaya Yaovi.

In Beninese hip hop and R'n'B, popular artists include King Jerry Bee, Yvan, Nila, Secteur Trema, Dibi Dobo, Pépé Oleka, Kuamy Mensah, Afafa, Diamant Noir, Cotonou City Crew, Ardiess, H2O, Dhalai-k, Kaysee Montejàno, LKS-Clan, Kaizah, Esprit Neg, Nasty Nesta, Mister Blaaz, Self Made Men, B-Syd, DAC, K-libr Volkaniq, Méthod X, Enod, Duce, Roccah, Jay Killah, Polo Orisha, Mutant, Adinon, Jupiter, 3K6, Kemtaan, 3 Game, CTN Heroes, Cyano-Gêne, ADN, 3e Monarchie, WP Baba Djèdjè, Orpair, Big C, Young J, Marshall Cyano, Wilf Enighma, Sam, Radama Z, Shinnin, E-ray, Cruiz AG, Sam Seed, Inox, BMG Yari, Fool' Faya, Mamba Noir, Beezy Baby, Eric le blanc, Assane Sas, Vision, All Baxx, Moona, Sakpata Boy, Trust Infinity Crew, Riacemau.

Benin is also home to zouk musicians such as Richard Flash, Martin Hode, and Miss Espoir.

Freres Olowumbe is a traditional gospel music.

== See also ==
- Sub-Saharan African music traditions
- Rhythm in Sub-Saharan Africa
- West African music
- Ewe people
- Ewe drumming
- Beninese hip hop

== Bibliography ==
- Bensignor, François and Eric Audra. "Afro-Funksters". 2000. In Broughton, Simon and Ellingham, Mark with McConnachie, James and Duane, Orla (Ed.), World Music, Vol. 1: Africa, Europe and the Middle East, pp 432–436. Rough Guides Ltd, Penguin Books. ISBN 1-85828-636-0
