= June 6 Movement =

June 6 Movement Mouvement du 6 Juin
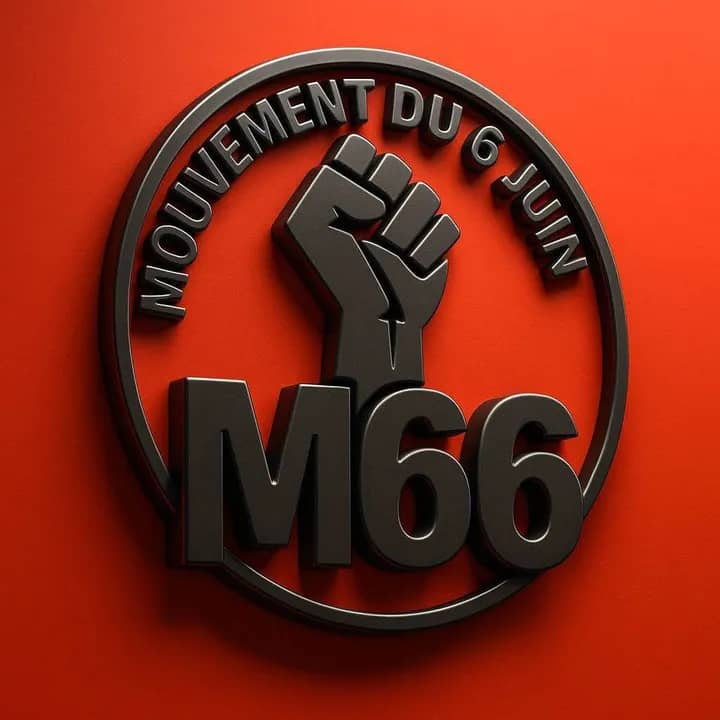
- Founded: June 6, 2025
- Ideology: Anti-authoritarianism; Popular sovereignty; Anti-Gnassingbé
- Political position: Big tent

Party flag
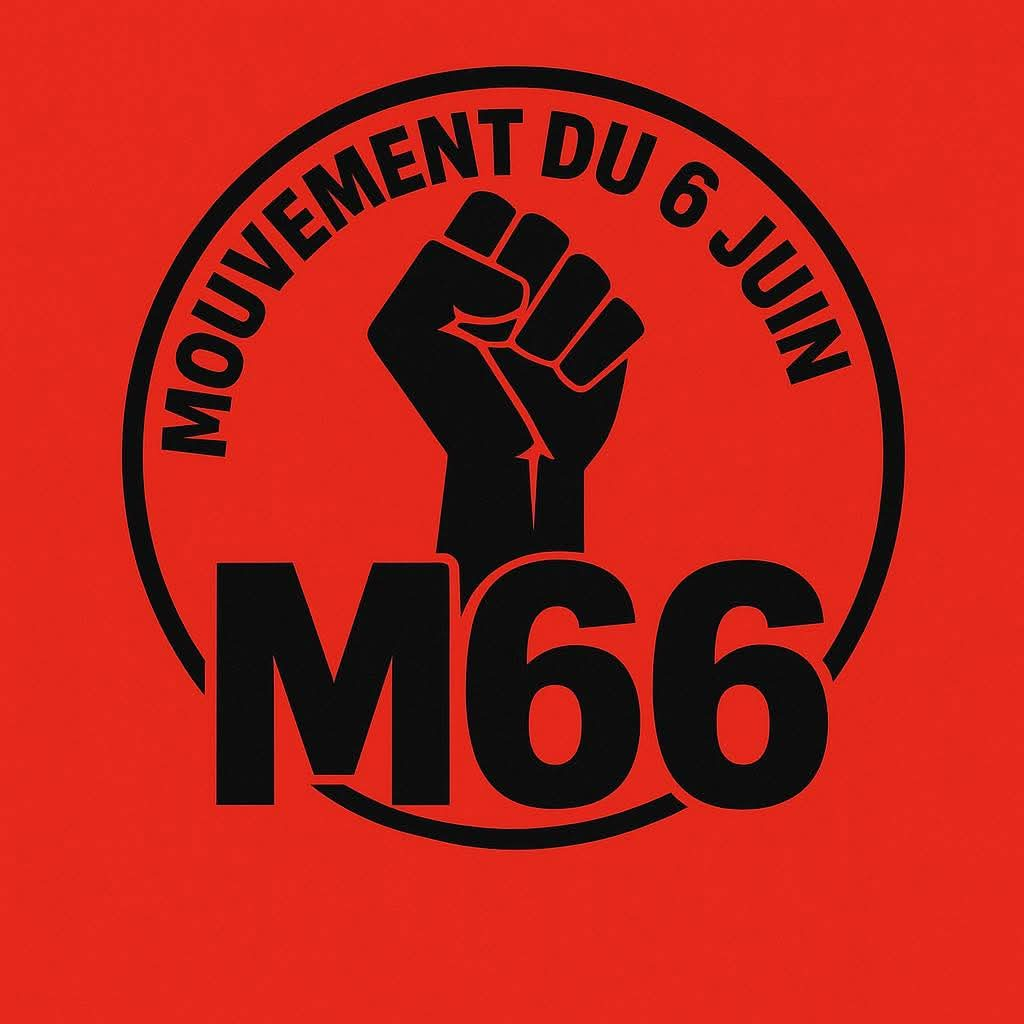

Website
- m66tg.org/en/

The June 6 Movement (also known as M 6.6) is a Togolese social and political movement created on 6 June 2025 and composed for the most part of bloggers and artists, notably from the diaspora.

== History ==
=== Background ===
The 'June 6 Movement' was born in a tense political context, marked by the constitutional revision carried out by a parliamentary group of the National Assembly on May 6, 2024. Following May 2024 and into early 2025, the Togolese government introduced a new constitutional change to convert the presidential system into a parliamentary or semi‑parliamentary system, and creating the role of the “President of the Council of Ministers”, which was then given to Faure Gnassingbè in May 2025. This major change was perceived by a significant segment of civil society as a power grab. In response, a group of committed Togolese citizens from diverse socio-political backgrounds launched the M66 movement to challenge this reform. The movement's name directly references the date of the May 6 constitutional reform and the date on which the protest that led to the creation of the movement, on June 6, 2025, occurred.

After Aamron's arrest (on the night between 26 and 27 May 2025), there were various protests held on 5 June 2025, which lasted up to 6 June 2025, and led to the Togolese armed forces reacting in a significantly aggressive manner, leading to the death of at least seven people. Aamron would later be released on 21 June 2025. That is when M 6.6 was created.

=== Mobilization ===
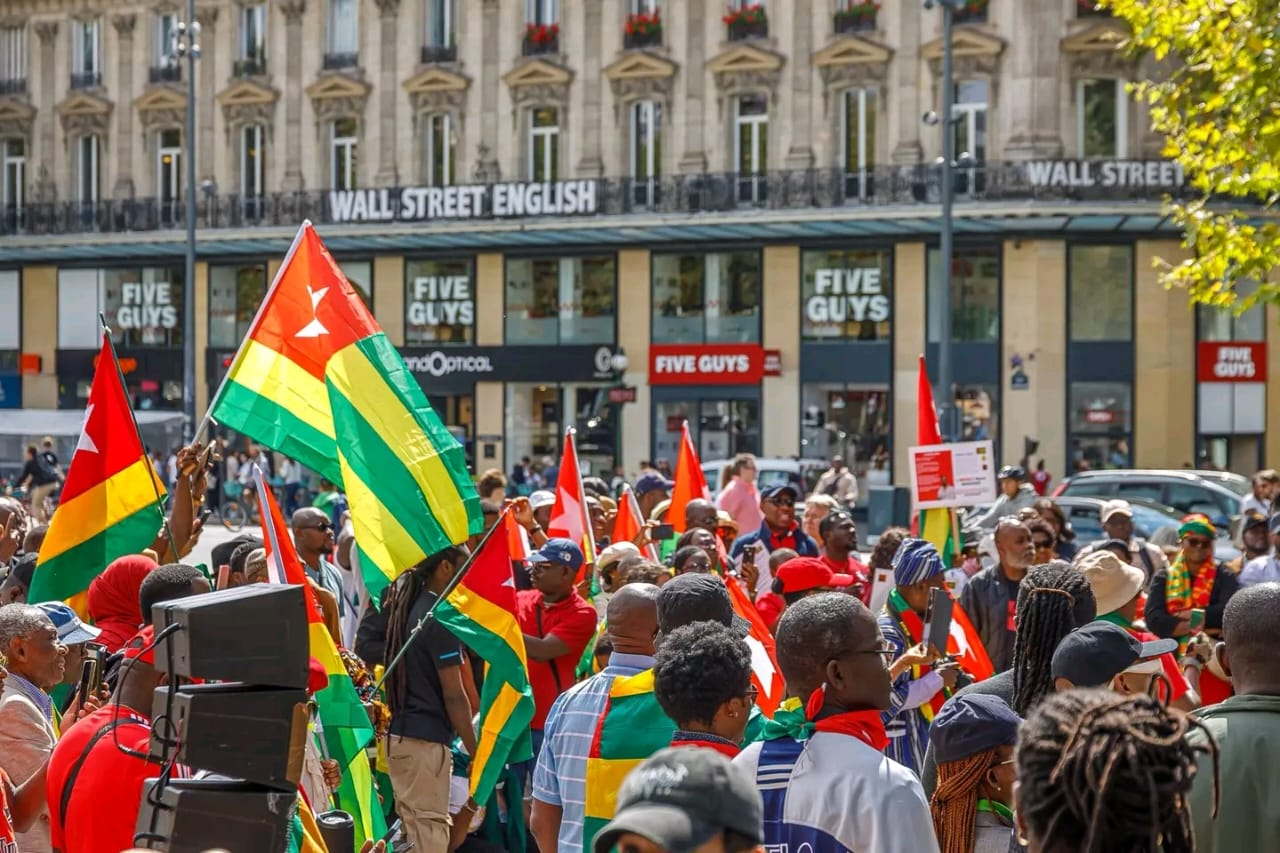
Mobilization of M 6.6 in Paris on 30 August 2025.

Starting from 23 June 2025, calls for civic disobedience by the M 6.6 increased significantly.

In July 2025, the June 6 Movement, announced they were going to initiate various protests, set for 16 and 17 July 2025. The date had been chosen as to disturb the 2025 Togo local elections. The government, in response, arrested numerous prominent members of the group as to prevent the protest from happening. On 16–17 July, people seem to have taken to the streets despite the repression. The subsequent election would have a significantly low turnout, some suggesting it was part of the boycott organized by the M 6.6.

By August 2025, the M 6.6 had grown in size and prominence, becoming a broader civic movement. Other groups started to pop up in support of M 6.6, Let's Save Togo and Hands off my Constitution, such as: Front Citoyen, Togo Debout and Novation Internationale. These organizations jointly announced another protest to be held on 30 August, named "Dead Togo". The protest aimed at specifically denounce the rising cost of living and the constitutional reform. The protest on 30 August was repressed violently. Amongst those protesting was the rapper Aamron and ex-defence minister Essozimna Marguerite Gnakade, who were one of those forcefully displaced upon the start of the protest and forced to go back home by security forces. Meanwhile, Kafui Adjamagbo-Johnson, who also expressed her will to participate, was not allowed to leave as the security forces surrounded her house and threatened her not to leave.

=== Representation to the United Nations ===
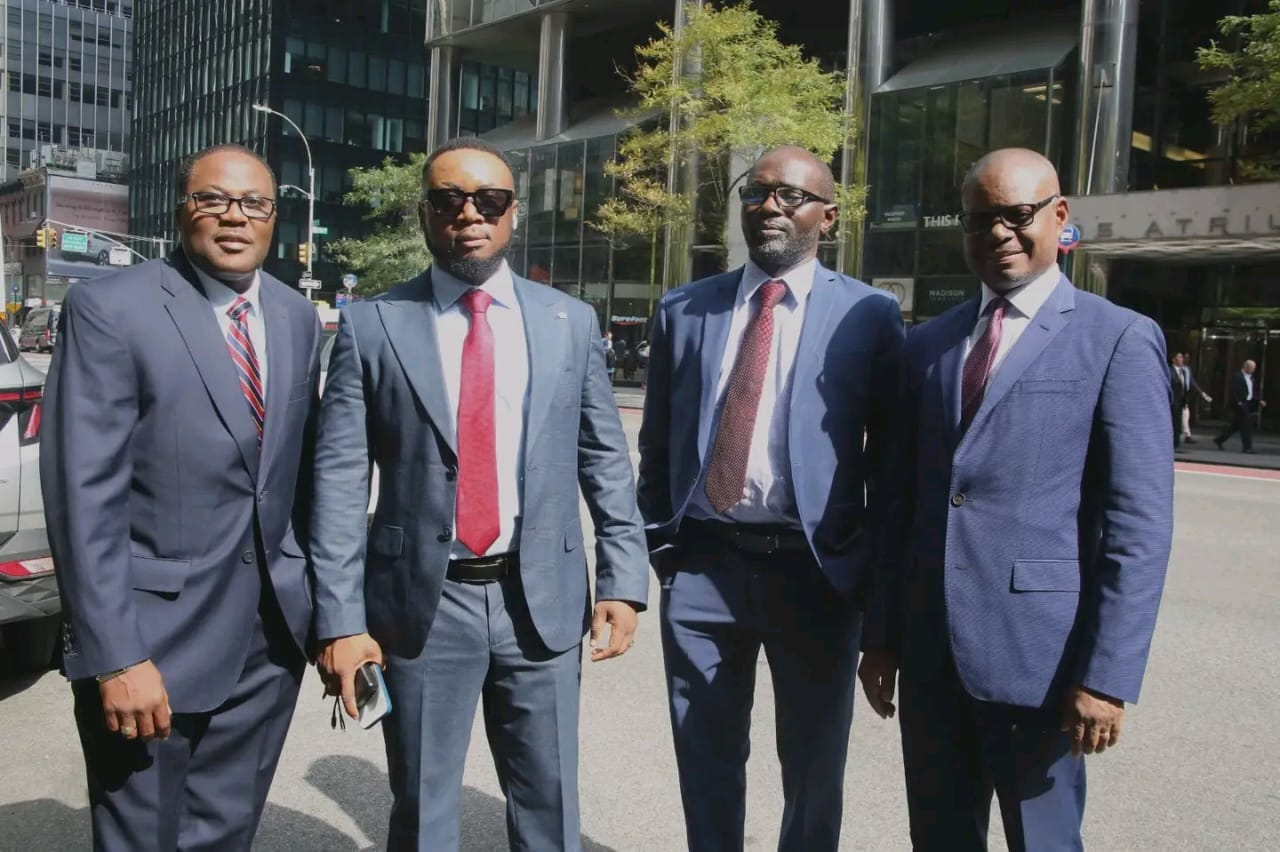
M 6.6 representatives at the United Nations

In September 2025, a delegation from the June 6 Movement, led by its spokesperson Yves Edoh Agbodjan, known as Togbevi Kpéssé, went to New York City for the occasion of the 80th session of the United Nations General Assembly

The stated objective of the delegation was to "draw the attention of the international community to the political and human rights situation in Togo " and to advocate for:

- The dispatch of a UN mission on human rights violations, which would also have to analyze the contents and the consequences of the adoption of the new 2024 Constitution.
- The appointment of a United Nations special envoy for Togo.The release of political prisoners still held captive from the various protests held in 2025 in Togo, and the opening of a democratic national dialogue.

During this stay, the delegation met with representatives of human rights organizations and several members of the Togolese diaspora in the United States.

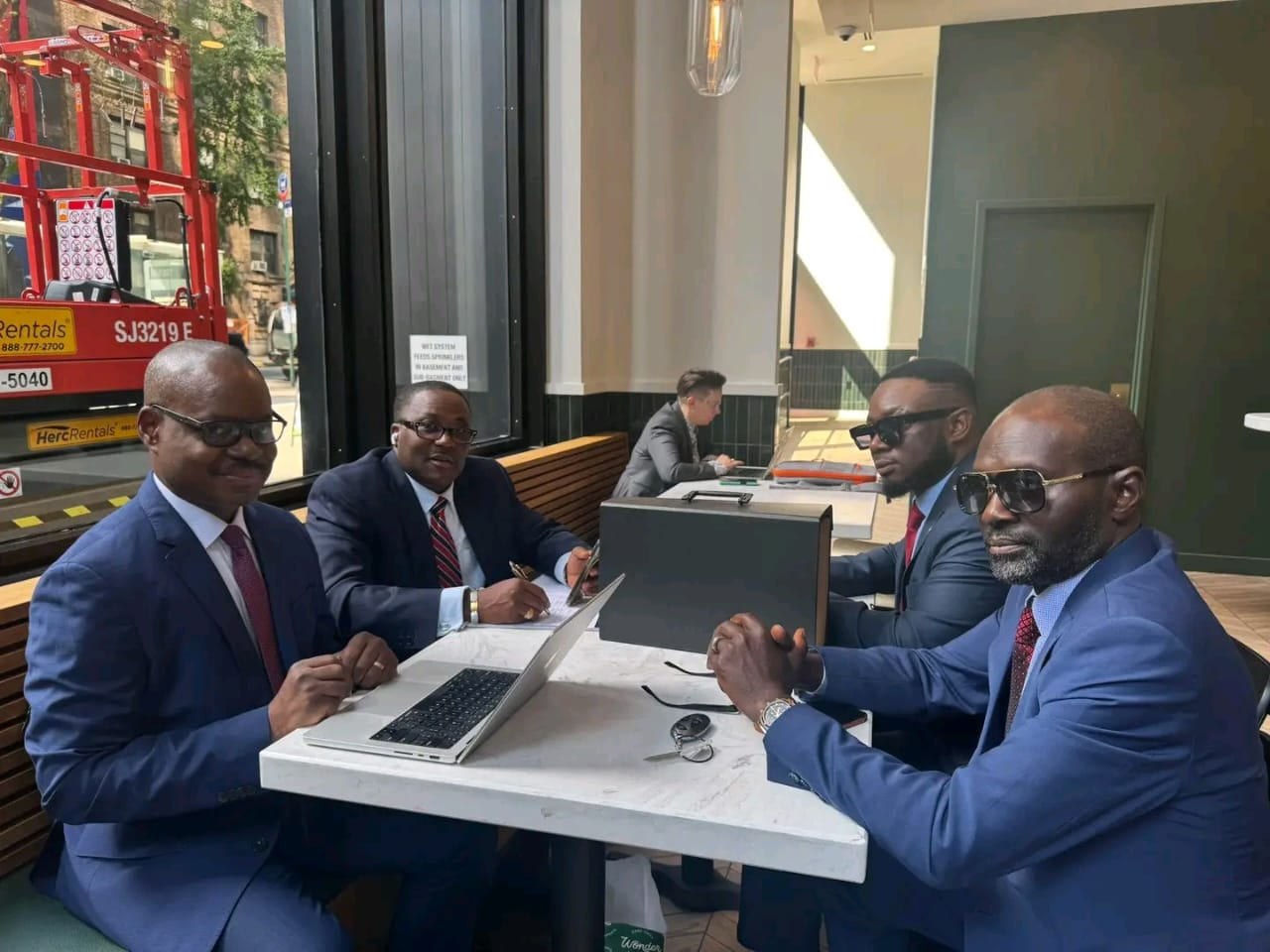
M 6.6 delegation in New York City.

During this mission, the M66 distributed a memorandum of approximately 40 pages summarizing its analysis of the Togolese crisis . Among the points highlighted were:

- The challenge to the Constitution of the Fifth Republic, which came into force in May 2025, and was deemed as "imposed without popular consultation";
- The denunciation of human rights violations (arbitrary arrests, restrictions on public freedoms, digital surveillance);
- The demand for a democratic transition, including a new consensual constitution, institutional reforms, and national reconciliation.
- The document also calls on the African Union, ECOWAS, UN member states, and neighbouring countries to exert diplomatic pressure or consider targeted sanctions against those responsible for human rights violations.

=== Further activities ===
After months of silence, M66 announced in November 2025 a major demonstration to be held on 8 December 2025, coinciding with the anniversary of the 9th Pan-African Congress in Lomé. The mobilization was announced of peaceful intentions, and through the use of X, TikTok, Facebook, and WhatsApp.

== Structure and organisation ==
=== Goals ===
The main objectives of the June 6th Movement (M66) are:

- The restoration of the initial 1992 constitutional order ( Togolese Constitution of 1992 ) before the revision of the May 6, 2024.
- The defense of democracy, the separation of powers, and popular sovereignty;
- Promoting democratic and peaceful political transitions in Togo.
- Raising awareness among citizens about the institutional and political issues of the country.
- The fall of President Faure Gnassingbé's government.

=== Membership demographic ===
Various groups are part of the movement, such as:

- Civil society activists;
- Bloggers , including the TikTokers Hodako, Kodjovitoguin, Togbévi Kpessé, Roméo Mokonzy, Gemy, etc.
- Committed artists, including Zaga Bambo, Aamron, etc.
- And especially members of the Togolese diaspora, including the activist and writer Farida Nabourema, Ferdinand Ayité, and many others.

== Reactions ==
The Togolese government has described the movement as an attempt to destabilize the country and the whole region. Authorities have reinforced security measures in response to calls for demonstrations both online and in real life. However, the M66 maintains that its approach is non-violent and constitutional.

=== International arrest mandate ===
On 9 July 2025, Togolese authorities announced they had issued international arrest warrants for several bloggers and artists who were members of the M 6.6.
