= Adowa dance =

Traditional dance performed by the Akans in Ghana

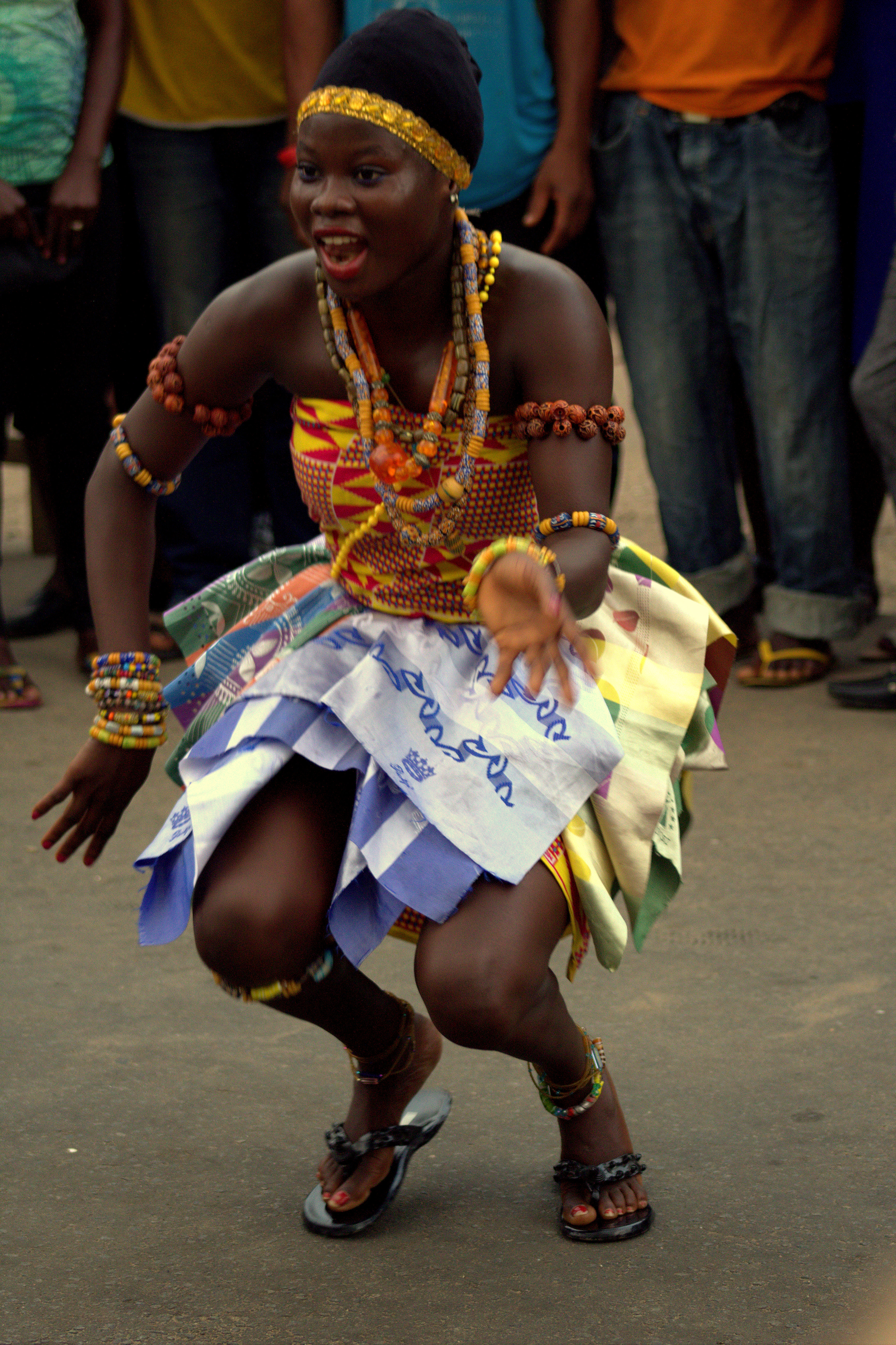
- Adowa Dancer in Kente Cloth
- Origin: Akan people of Ghana

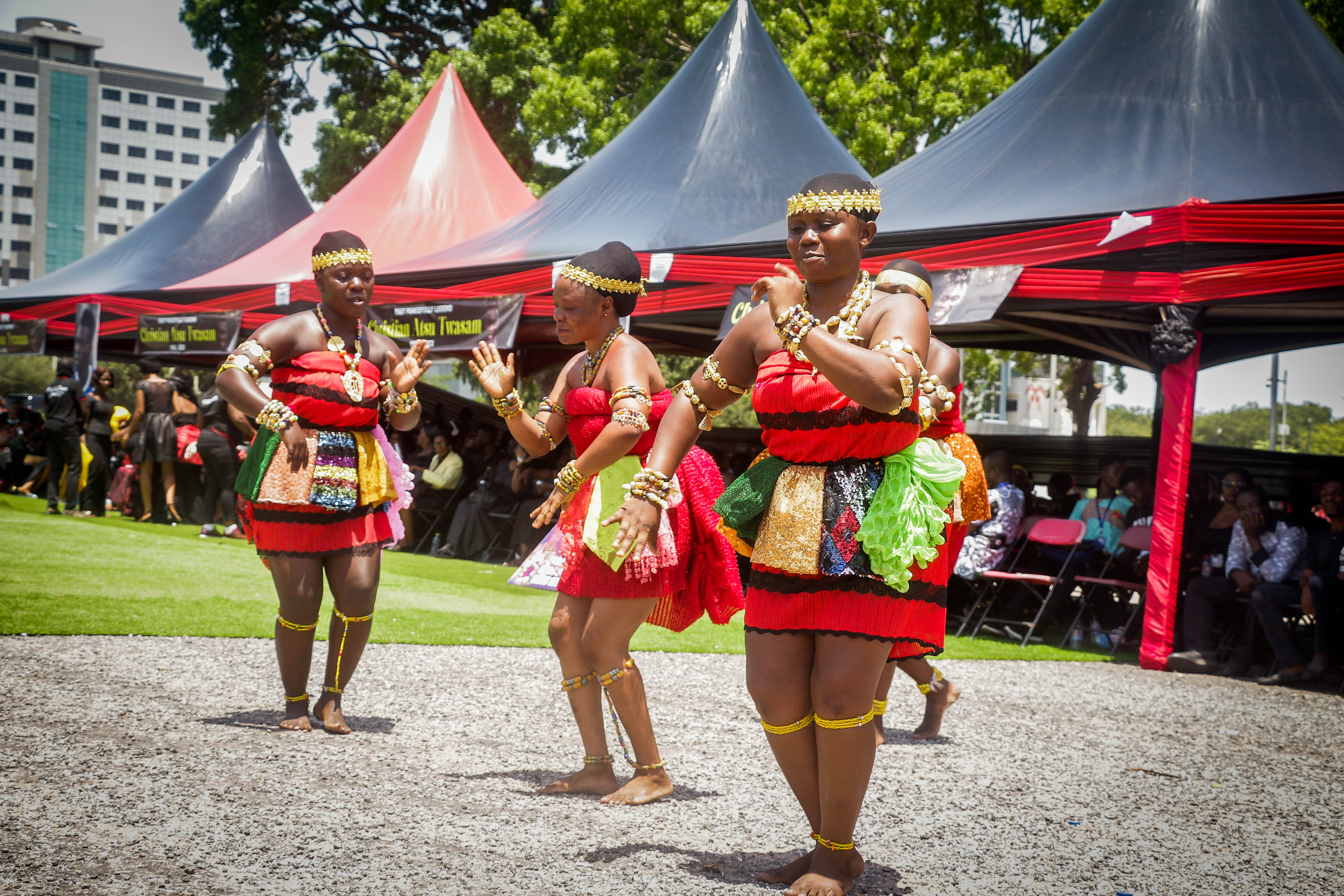
This is a picture of an Adowa dance performed by a duo

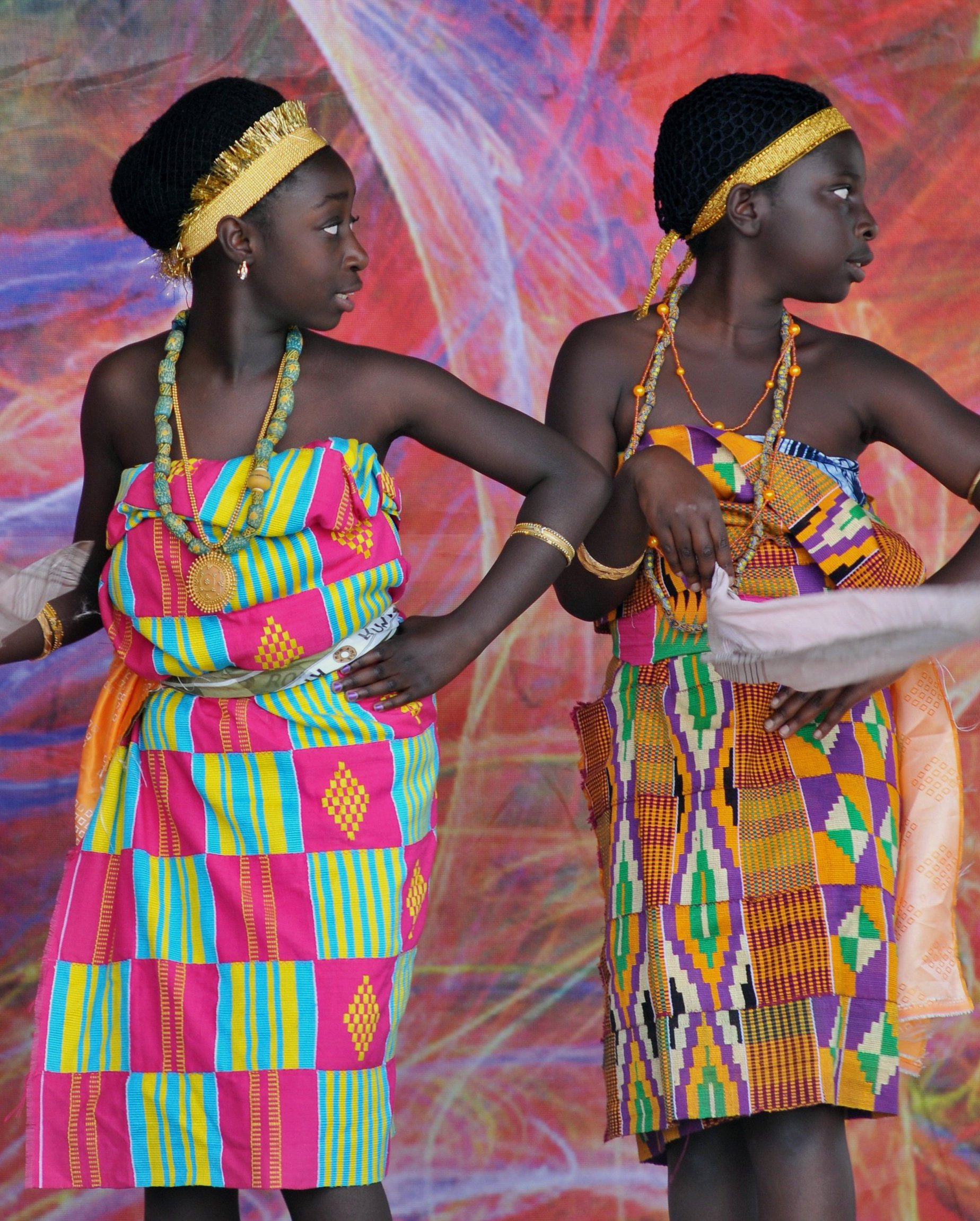
Two young girls dancing Adowa

Adowa is a popular traditional dance of the Akan people of Ghana, performed at cultural ceremonies like festivals, funerals, engagements, and celebrations. The Adowa dance is a sign of expression that allows performers to communicate their emotions and feelings through their hands and feet. There are different hand movements performed for each setting. People communicate positive emotions at weddings or engagements, chieftaincy enstoolment, and negative emotions at funerals.

An Adowa ensemble consists of a lead singer, a chorus, and percussion instruments. The leader and chorus are almost always middle-aged women, who accompany themselves with hand-clapping and/or a double bell (dawure) or a single bell (atoke).

== Movements ==
Adowa dancers use symbolic language, with different hand movements telling their own story. This body language is accentuated by the use of a white cloth that they hold in their hand. In performing Adowa, the dancers mainly utilize their hands and feet. There are basic steps to this dance style. The performer first has to apply pressure and move his or her right foot forward. While performing, the dancer also ensures that there is an interaction with the drummer that is not obvious.

== Notable Adowa performers ==
- In 2017, SP Kofi Sarpong performed the Adowa dance.
- In 2018, Alban Bagbin performed the Adowa dance.
- In 2022, Nana Ama McBrown performed the Adowa dance.
- In 2023, Memphis Depay performed the Adowa dance after he scored a goal.
- In 2023, Grand P performed the Adowa dance.
- In 2024, Yaw Osafo-Marfo performed the Adowa dance.
- In 2024, Richard Ofori performed the Adowa dance.
- In 2025, Freezy Macbones made an entrance into the ring with the Adowa dance
- In 2025, Dzenbii cultural group performed Adowa dance in the USA
