= Grand P =

Guinean musician

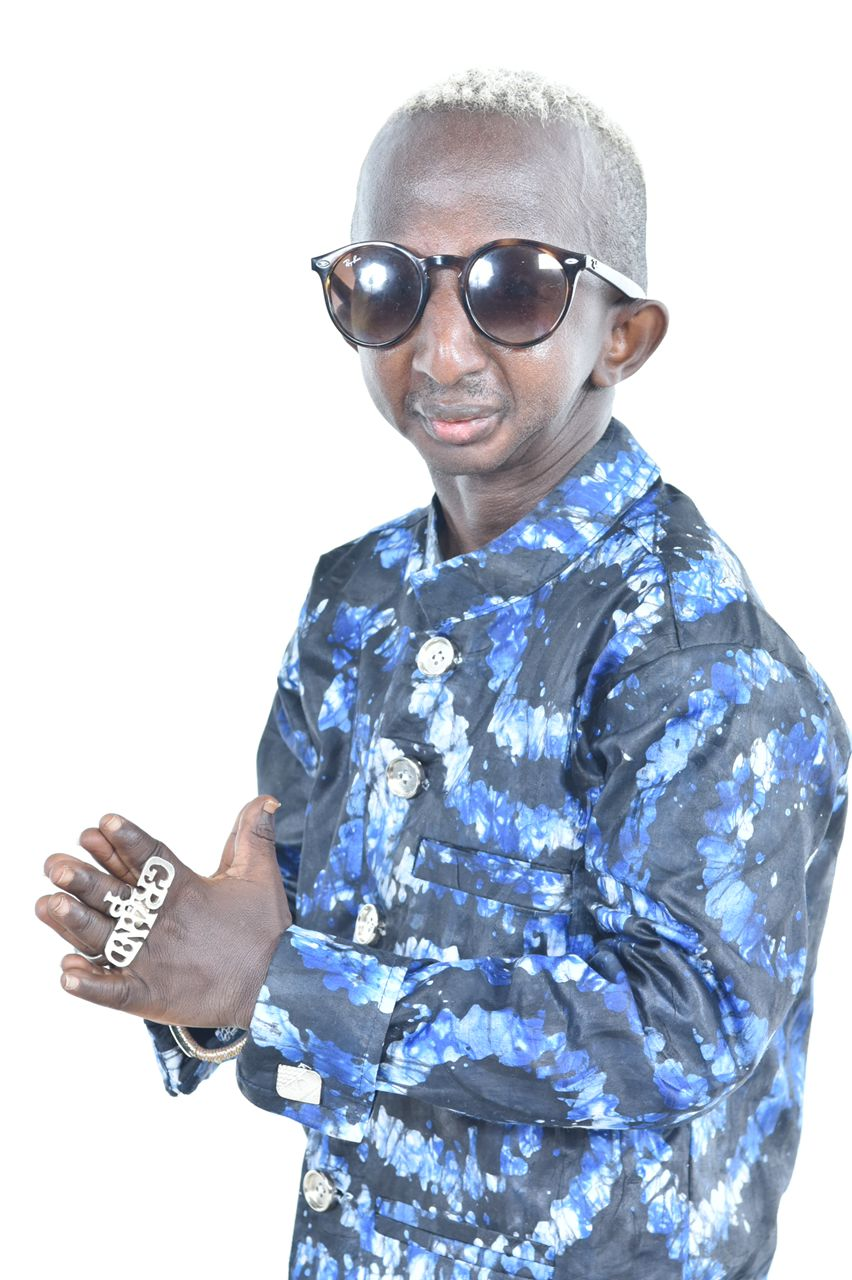
- Born: Moussa Sandiana Kaba; 11 October 1990 (age 36); Sanguiana
- Citizenship: Guinea
- Occupation: Musician
- Years active: 2019 present
- Partner: Mariame Diakite

Moussa Sandiana Kaba (born October 11, 1990, in Sanguiana, Nabaya, Guinea), known as Grand P, is a Guinean musician with challenges of progeria, a condition causing accelerated aging.

== Early life ==
Grand P spent his formative years in the quaint town of Sanguiana, guided by his parents, commonly referred to as Mr. and Mrs. Kaba.

== Career ==
Grand P's journey to recognition began during a show organized by his idol, Kerfala Kante, at the People's Palace in Conakry. Notably, he supported the Guinean delegation in Cairo during CAN 2019, marking a significant milestone. Collaborating with influential figures in the Guinean music industry, such as Azaya and King Alasko, Grand P has released singles and an album titled "I khadi nanna." His notable singles include "Grand P Barana," "Life," and "Syli." In 2019, he collaborated with Sidiki Diabaté on "Irhafama," and in 2020, Boncena featured him in "Amour Ndoto (Dream)."

Beyond music, Grand P is recognized as a social media influencer and politician.
