= Punani =

Punani may refer to:

- "Punani" (song), 2020 song by 6ix9ine
- Punani (village), a village in Sri Lanka
- "Punani", a 2008 song by Anda Adam
- Punani (drag queen), a French drag queen
