= Paul Villard (composer) =

"La Tchadienne"
Chad's national anthem "La Tchadienne", which Villard composed, performed here by the U.S. Navy Band in the early 1990s.

Paul Villard (1899–1986) composed the national anthem of Chad, "La Tchadienne". He was a Jesuit.
