= Louis Gidrol =

Chadian musician

- Born: January 1, 1922
- Citizenship: Chad
- Occupation: Writer

Louis Gidrol was a Chadian musician. He wrote the national anthem for Chad with Paul Villard in 1960, along with help from his student group. He and his students were part of St. Paul's School, which is where it was composed. It is called "La Tchadienne" and is played widely on important national events like Independence Day and to this day is one of the most important songs in Chad's history because it was named the national anthem. Gidrol was born in 1922 and has died, however when he died is still unknown.

Here is a copy of the anthem written by Louis Gidrol.

French lyrics

: Peuple Tchadien, debout et à l'ouvrage! : Tu as conquis la terre et ton droit; : Ta liberté naîtra de ton courage. : Lève les yeux, l'avenir est à Toi.

: O mon Pays, que Dieu te prenne en garde, : Que tes voisins admirent tes enfants. : Joyeux, pacifique, avance en chantant, : Fidèle à tes anciens qui te regardent.

English translation

People of Chad, arise and work!
You have conquered the soil and won your rights;
Your freedom will be born of your courage.
Lift up your eyes, the future is yours. o

O my Country, may God protect you,
May your neighbours admire your children.
Joyful, peaceful, advance as you sing,
Faithful to your fathers who are watching you.
