= Aamron =

Togolese rapper and activist

- Born: Tchala Essowè Narcisse; October 29, 1987 (age 38); Kara, Togo
- Origin: Togo
- Genre: Rap
- Occupations: Rapper and activist
- Years active: 2009–present
- Awards: All Music Awards: 2010 Best rap song and best video of the year at the All Music Awards; 2011 Best rap song and best video of the year at the All Music Awards

Aamron (Kara, 29 October 1987), whose real name is Tchala Essowè Narcisse, is a rapper and entrepreneur from Togo. He was also previously known as Amron.

== Biography ==
He was inspired by French rapper MC Solaar, who is of Senegalese origin, at age 15, when he started his rapping career. However, he was initially supposed to pursue a career as a lawyer. In 2009, he made his debut to the Togolese public with his first single, Amron. In August 2010, he released his first album, Black Boys, featuring sixteen tracks. That same year, he won the award for best rap song and best video of the year at the Togo Hip Hop Awards with the music video for Black Boys. In 2011, he released a new single, Alléluia tout baigne, which earned him the awards for best rap song and best video of the year at the All Music Awards.

== Discography ==
=== Singles ===
- 2012: Do it easy (feat. Mister Blaaz)

== Awards ==
- 2010: Best Rap Song and Best Video of the Year at the All Music Awards.
- 2011: Best rap song and best video of the year at the All Music Awards.

== Legal troubles and arrests ==
In May 2025, Aamron was arrested again in Lomé following several critical messages about the government on social media. According to Agence France-Presse and other media outlets, he was initially interned in a psychiatric hospital, sparking a wave of protests in early June 2025. After a week without news, he reappeared in a video apologizing to President Faure Gnassingbé and mentioning "severe depression". He was released on the 21st of June, with no legal proceedings having been brought against him. On 30 August, the artist briefly participated in a march in his neighborhood in support of a call by the June 6 movement to protest against the government. On 19 September, he was arrested again and placed under judicial supervision for "aggravated disturbance of public order," "calling for popular uprising", and "inciting the army to revolt". His lawyer said he was charged but released the same day. Civil society organizations claim that at least seven people were killed during the June protests related to these events.
