= Jera (dance) =

Traditional dance in the Northern region, Ghana

Jera is a traditional dance popularly performed by the Dagomba people of the Northern region of Ghana.

Jera Traditional Dance
