= La Tchadienne =

National anthem of Chad

English: Song of the Chadian
- National anthem of Chad
- Lyrics: Louis Gidrol and others
- Music: Paul Villard
- Adopted: January 1960

Audio sample
- U.S. Navy Band instrumental version (chorus and one verse): file; help

"La Tchadienne" (English: "Song of the Chadian", lit. '"The Chadian (Song)"') is the national anthem of Chad. Written by Louis Gidrol and his student group and composed by Paul Villard, it has been the official state anthem of Chad since it gained independence from France in January 1960.

== History ==
The anthem was written, following a competition, by Jesuit father Louis Gidrol and his student group from the Saint Paul Boarding School in Fort-Archambault (the current city of Sarh). The music was composed by another Jesuit father, Paul Villard. It was adopted as the official state anthem of Chad upon gaining independence from France in January 1960.

== Lyrics ==
The anthem comprises a chorus and four verses. Only the chorus and first verse constitute the official national anthem. The other three verses are barely known among young Chadians.

French lyrics

Refrain:
Peuple Tchadien, debout et à l'ouvrage !
Tu as conquis ta terre et ton droit;
Ta liberté naîtra de ton courage.
Lève les yeux, l'avenir est à Toi.

I
Ô mon Pays, que Dieu te prenne en garde,
Que tes voisins admirent tes enfants.
Joyeux, pacifique, avance (Note: Sometimes written en avant.) en chantant,
Fidèle à tes anciens (Note: Sometimes written ancêtres.) qui te regardent.

Refrain

II
Race du Nord, et ses troupeaux immenses,
Race du Sud, qui cultive les champs.
Pasteurs, montagnards, pêcheurs, commerçants
Soyons un seul grand peuple qui s’avance.

Refrain

III
La houe en main, fais vaillamment ta corde,
Vois tes enfants que tourmente la faim
Les champs devant toi attendent ton grain
Que l’huile coule et tes greniers débordent.

Refrain

IV
Tes ingénieurs te traceront des routes,
Tes médecins te rendront grand et fort,
À l’œuvre étudiant, sans craindre l’effort;
Mets l’ignorance et le mal en déroute.

Refrain

Arabic lyrics

كورال:
شعب تشاد قم إلي العمل (Note: Also شعب تشاد هيا الى العمل.)
إسترديت أرضاك وحقاك (Note: Also لقد كسبت ارضاك وحقاك.)
وحرياتك تولودك من شجاعتك (Note: Also حريتك ستاتي من شجاعتك.)
إرفع عينيك فالمستقبل لك

١
يا بلادي فليحفظك الله
فليحفظ جيرانك وأبنائك أيه (Note: Also وليعجب جيرانك باولادك.)
المحيط الساري تقدم وأنت تنشد (Note: Also بالفرح والسلام إلى الأمام بالغناء.)
وافيا لأسلافك الذين ينظرون إليك (Note: Also مخلصا لابائك الذين يراقبونك.)

كورال

٢
العرق الشمالي وقطعانه الضخمة
سباق الجنوب الذي يزرع الحقول
القساوسة ومتسلقو الجبال والصيادون والتجار
دعونا نكون شعبًا عظيمًا قادمًا

كورال

٣
المجرفة في اليد ، جعل الحبل بشجاعة
شاهد أطفالك يعذبهم الجوع
الحقول أمامك تنتظر الحبوب
دع الزيت يتدفق ويفيض السندرات

كورال

٤
سيقوم مهندسوك بتحديد مساراتك
سيجعلك أطبائك طويلًا وقويًا
في عمل الطالب دون خوف من الجهد
ضع الجهل والشر على الفرار

كورال

Arabic transliteration

Kūrāl:
Šaʿbu Tšād qum ʾilā-l-ʿamal
Istardayta ʾarḍāka wa-ḥaqqaka
Wa-ḥurriyyatika tīwalidat min šajāʿatika
Irfaʿ ʿaynayka fa-l-mustaqbalu lakka

I
Yā bilādī fal-yaḥfaẓuk-illāh
Fa-l-yaḥfaẓa jīrānika ua'bnaj'k ʾabnayʾka ʾayah'
Al-muḥīṭu as-sārrī taqaddam wa-ʾanta tunšidūn?
wāfiyyah l-ʾasalāfika aḏ-ḏaynu yanẓurūna ʾilayka

Kūrāl

English translation

Chorus:
People of Chad, arise and to work!
You have conquered your soil and won your rights;
Your freedom will be born of your courage.
Lift up your eyes, the future is yours.

I
O my Country, may God protect you,
May your neighbors admire your children.
Joyful, peaceful, advance as you sing,
Faithful to your fathers who are watching you.

Chorus

II
Race of the North, and its immense herds,
Race of the South, who cultivates the fields.
Shepherds, mountaineers, fishers and traders,
Let us be a single great people who advances.

Chorus

III
Hoe in hand, valiantly make your rope,
See your children who are tomented by hunger,
The fields before you wait for your grain.
Let oil flow and your granaries overflow.

Chorus

IV
Your engineers will trace roads on you
Your physicians will make you big and strong
Student, to work, without worrying about the effort
Put ignorance and evil in debacle.

Chorus
