= Sanguiana =

- Sub-prefecture and town
- Location in Guinea
- Coordinates: 10°47′N 10°11′W
- Country: Guinea
- Region: Kankan Region
- Prefecture: Kouroussa Prefecture

Population
  - Total: 23,809
- Time zone: UTC+0 (GMT)

Sanguiana (N’ko: ߛߊ߲߬ߖߊ߲߰ߠߊ߫) is a town and sub-prefecture in the Kouroussa Prefecture in the Kankan Region of eastern-central Guinea. As of 2014 it had a population of 23,809 people.
