= Miss Espoir =

Singer-songwriter from Bénin (1980–))

- Born: Enagnon Omonloto Ahmada; January 24, 1980; Porto-Novo, Bénin
- Occupation: Singer-songwriter
- Notable work: Seconde Chance

Miss Espoir born Enagnon Omonloto Ahmada in January 24, 1980 in Porto-Novo, Benin is an artist and singer-songwriter. Her début LP was Bougez in 2006.

She initiated Cœur d'Or, a project aiming to help vulnerable and poor persons in Benin.

== Biography ==
=== Childhood ===
Miss Espoir was born on January 24, 1980, in Porto-Novo. Her parents are Yaovi Ahamada, a former goalkeeper of the AS Dragons FC de l'Ouémé and Josephine Noukpo. She lived in a polygamous family.

She learned at the age of five that she had contracted polio. She was not vaccinated because her mother did not have the money to vaccinate her and her brothers.

From a young age, despite her physical handicap (polio), she participated in cultural events in schools and in church choirs in her native town of Porto-Novo, influenced and trained by her elders, including Vivi l'internationale, the producer André Quenum and M'Pongo Love, also a victim of polio like her.

=== Career in music ===
Miss Espoir worked as a secretary at André Quernum's studio Musigerme. Her musical career started in this studio with the release in 2006 of her first LP titled Bougez, with songs such as Mayi O et Maman Dagbé. Following this she released several LPs and singles. In the song Vilaine polio she expressed the difficulties caused by polio in her own life and advocated for parents to have their children vaccinated against this disease.

In 2019 she released the single Championnat. She evokes in this song the rivality between women when they show love interest in the same man.

=== Engagements ===
Miss Espoir is known for her commitment to social issues. She has given herself the vocation to distil joy in the areas that lack it. She started with periodic concerts in the barracks of the Beninese armed forces. She then initiated Coeur d'or, a project where she periodically organizes concerts to collect food for the benefit of vulnerable people, especially abandoned children and prisoners. Every year she collects donations and food that she makes available to the most vulnerable.

In March 2022 she sang in Cotonou for the International Women's Day.

== Albums ==
- Seconde Chance (2018)
- Parfum Chocolat (2008)
- Bougez
