= Blaaz =

- Also known as: Blaaz, Mister Blaaz, Un seul mot
- Born: Nabil Franck Assani; January 27, 1988 (age 38); Kano, Nigeria
- Origin: Benin
- Genres: Hip hop
- Occupations: Rapper, Composer
- Years active: 2007 –present
- Labels: Cotonou City Crew; Eben Entertainment; Self-Made-Men
- Website: Blaaz official site

Nabil Franck Assani (born January 27, 1988), known by his stage name Blaaz, is a Beninese hip hop recording artist from Kano, Nigeria.

== Biography ==
He appears for the first time on the album of Fool Faya in 2007. During the same year Blaaz appears with Cyano-gêne on the single " Hard lyrical " followed by " Alerte Rouge " which was so much successfully that Cotonou City Crew decides to work in project with him. It was a very good collaboration which never stopped increasing the artist who begins by getting noticed through the single " Ou est ma monnaie " of the group CCC. A mixtape which was moreover the most downloaded song of the times. The success of this single also brought Blaaz in 2008 with the release of the single " Aller Retour " which also was the single which announced the release of his first album entitled Ghetto Blaazter on December 26, 2008. Better song of 2008 with the single Aller Retour making him one of several media in Benin. Blaaz is then requested everywhere in Benin and insub-region for concerts and others etc.... From 2008 until the end of year 2010 we find him in the mixtape W.A.R. Things changed with time and Blaaz travelled to Gabon to sign an agreement with the gabonese label Eben Entertainment in 2011. With Eben , he marks his return with a new single " Le fou " which was the more downloaded song of the time. He is also present on the mixtape of Eben Family 3 of the group Eben Entertainment announced for 2012. With Nouvelle Donne Music, the beninese rapper signed his first single " Ne me laisse pas tomber ". He also took up his own label: « Self-Made-Men » in the same year of 2012, what enabled him to be raised to the rank of third artist behind the group CCC the category of better artist or group of the year by the magazine U.M.A in 2013. Blaaz will make another success thanks to his single " Je vais vous tuer tous " which moreover marked the beginning of year 2014.

== Personal life ==
Blaaz has been living in Côte d'Ivoire for several years.

== Discography ==
=== Albums studio ===
- 2008 : Ghetto Blaazter
- 2013 : Compte à rebours
- 2018 : Alpha
