= Essozimna Marguerite Gnakade =

Togolese politician

Minister of the Armed Forces of Togo
- In office October 1, 2020 – December 23, 2022
- President: Faure Gnassingbé
- Prime Minister: Victoire Tomegah Dogbé

Personal details
- Born: Togo

Essozimna Marguerite Gnakade is a Togolese politician. On October 1, 2020 she was appointed defence minister in Togo, the first woman to hold that role.

Gnadake does not have previous military experience. She was the wife of Ernest Gnassingbé, the deceased brother of Togo's president Faure Gnassingbé.
