= Keleli =

Lute in Chad

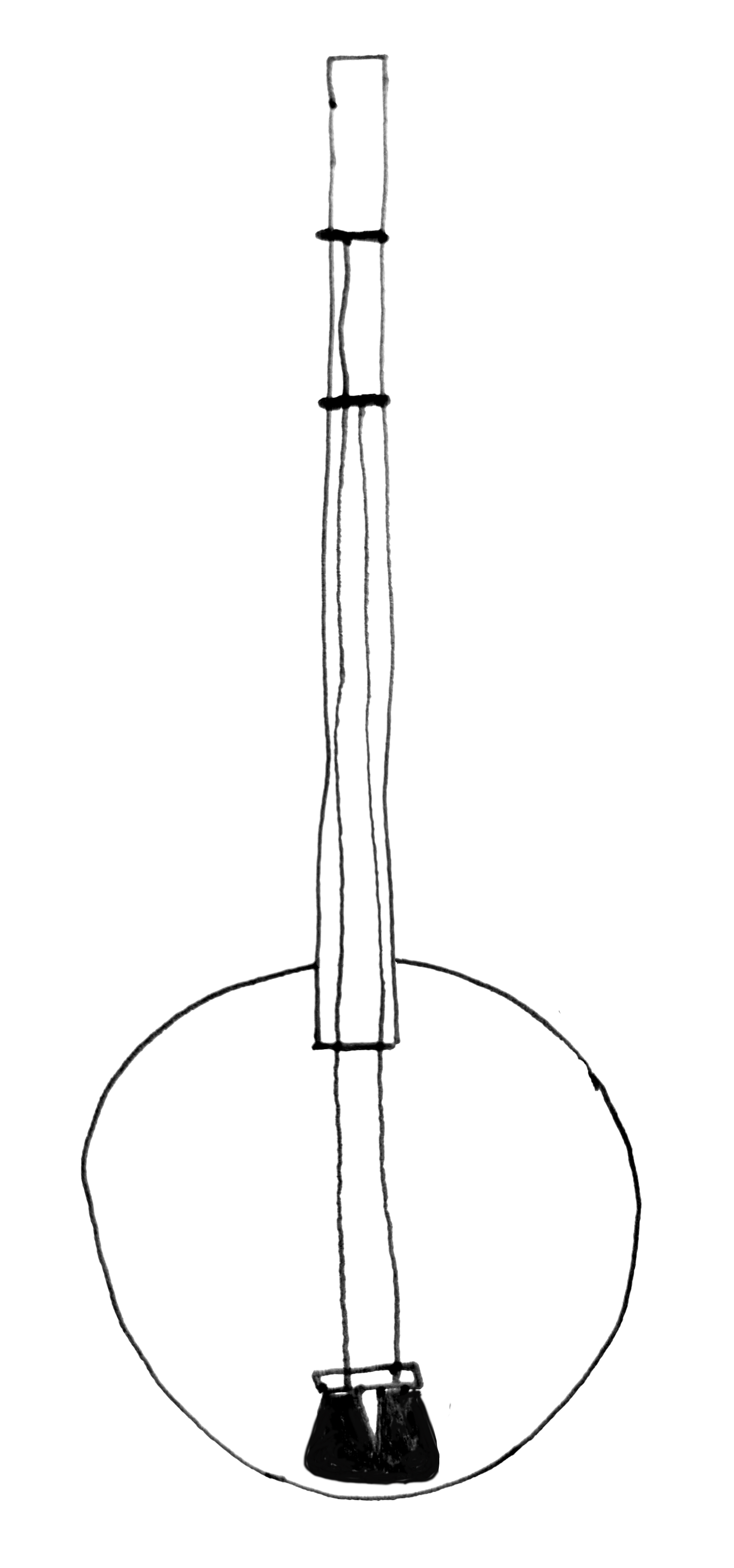
Drawing of a keleli. At the soundhole, the skin is rolled up around a stick or peg. Strings tied to the sharp end peeking through the soundhole go over the rolled up skins and stick, holding them in place. The rolled skin and stick act as a bridge. The neck is a round stick, thinner than drawn. Strings run up the neck and are tied to straps, themselves tied around the neck.

The keleli is a lute of the Teda people of Tibesti, Republic of Chad.

The instrument consists of a round bowl covered with camel, goat or zebra-hide soundboard, and a neck to support the strings.

The instrument is built by individuals for themselves. Children lean to play by imitating adults.

== Construction ==
The keleli is a half-spike lute, in which the end of the neck pokes out though the soundboard, as on a xalam. This is one of two styles common to the spike lutes. The other common style is a full spike lute, in which the neck of the instrument goes through two opposite sides of a bowl-shaped soundbox as on a gurmi.

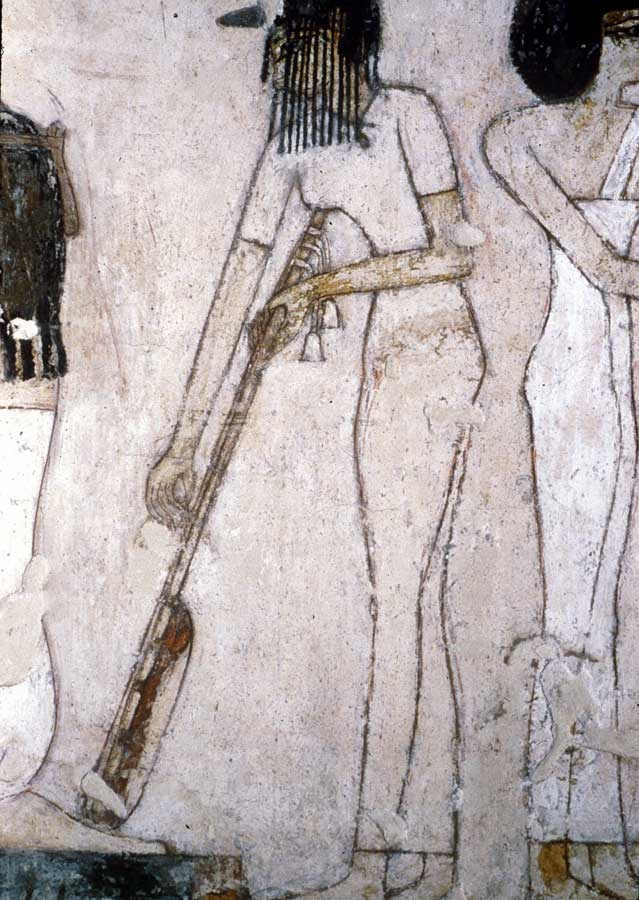
Musician tuning her lute, pulling the string upward, her other hand holding the neck of the instrument near the tuning rings or straps. Tomb of Rekhmire, 18th Dynasty.

The lute has round soundbox, about 20 inches across, made from a gourd, carved from wood or fashioned from an enamel bowl or metal bowl. The skin soundboard is placed raw over the bowl's opening and tied underneath with thongs. When it dries, it tightens, becoming resonant like a drumhead. The died hide is shaved with a knife.

It is strung with two or three strings, traditionally, strings made from goat sinew. Today nylon strings are common. The bridge is a length of a stick laid on the soundboard next to a soundhole. The strings coming from the neck pass over it and down through the soundhole into the bowl, to attach to the butt of the neck. The soundhole is about 30mm tall by 50mm wide.

Strings are tied to tuning rings or straps on the neck, rather than using tuning pegs; the system is ancient, the tradition found as far back as Ancient Egypt. Another trait similar to ancient Egypt is the manner in which the neck goes through a hole in the top of the soundboard and run under it until it reaches another hole, thus being threaded into the soundboard. The end of the stick is exposed at a soundhole near the bowls end.

== Tuning and playing ==
For a two string instrument, the strings are tuned about a third apart. For a three-string instrument, the third string (chanterelle) is turned an octave above the lowest-note string.

The instrument is played by men and boys, starting as children until they reach their mid-forties. There is a set repertoire of music for the instrument, usually only instrumental, but sometimes with "bourdon-like humming in the letter zzz, or a low, quiet whispering of a text."

== Similar instruments ==
The keleli is very similar to another Teda lute called the kiiki. The main difference between the two is that the kiiki is strung with only one string (made of 12 srands of horsehair) and is bowed instead of plucked. Each lute, plucked and bowed, may be converted to the other by changing strings.

- chegeni, Kanembu people, two strings
- chegeni, Daza people, two strings with additional short drone string (as on banjo and akonting).
