= Hu hu =

String instrument originating in 19th century China

The hu hu (Chinese: 胡胡) is a string instrument originating in 19th century China. It is similar to the erhu and is typically made of wood, snakeskin, fabric, glue, bamboo, and horsehair.

== See also ==
- Chinese music
