= Kafui Adjamagbo-Johnson =

Togolese politician, lawyer and human rights activist

Personal details
- Born: 26 December 1958 (age 67) Bassar, Togo
- Party: Democratic Convention of African Peoples
- Education: University of Lomé; University of Paris V; University of Paris I (PhD)

Brigitte Kafui Adjamagbo-Johnson (born 26 December 1958) is a Togolese politician, lawyer and human rights activist, and the first woman to stand as a candidate in a presidential election in her country.

== Early life ==
Adjamagbo-Johnson was born on 26 December 1958 in Bassar, Togo, the daughter of Cornélie, a midwife, and Paul Adjamagbo, a physician.

== Education ==
Adjamagbo-Johnson earned a master's degree in law in 1983 from the University of Lomé, followed by a DEA in private law at the University of Paris V, Malakoff, and a second DEA in private law and comparative law, African rights option and a PhD in 1986 at the University of Paris I, Panthéon Sorbonne.

She later worked as a lecturer at the University of Lomé.

== Career ==
Adjamagbo-Johnson was a founding member of the Convention démocratique des peuples africains (CDPA), and was the general rapporteur for its 1991 its National Conference. She held several senior positions in government, rising to be a minister, and became known for her "outspokenness and political commitment", and has been nicknamed "The Iron Lady".

Since April 1997, Adjamagbo-Johnson has been the co-ordinator of the West Africa sub-regional office of WiLDAF (Law and Development in Africa).

In 2010, Adjamagbo-Johnson was the head of the opposition Democratic Convention of African Peoples party, and the first woman to stand as a candidate in a presidential election in her country. However, in February 2010, Adjamagbo-Johnson and two other main opposition candidates in the presidential elections withdrew as a protest against they believed would be a rigged result.

Writing on the African Feminist Forum, Adjamagbo-Johnson says, "My journey with feminism began quite early in life as my awareness increased of the inequalities and oppression of women in my family environment, my neighborhood and in society in general".

In November 2020 Adjamagbo-Johnson was arrested at her home in Togo's capital Lomé. In a televised address, the prosecutor Essolissam Poyodi claimed to have uncovered opposition "documents that contained a plan to destabilise the country". After international protest, she was released from detention on 17 December 2020.
