= Gen Z protests in Asia =

2020s protests and uprisings

- Part of Gen Z protests
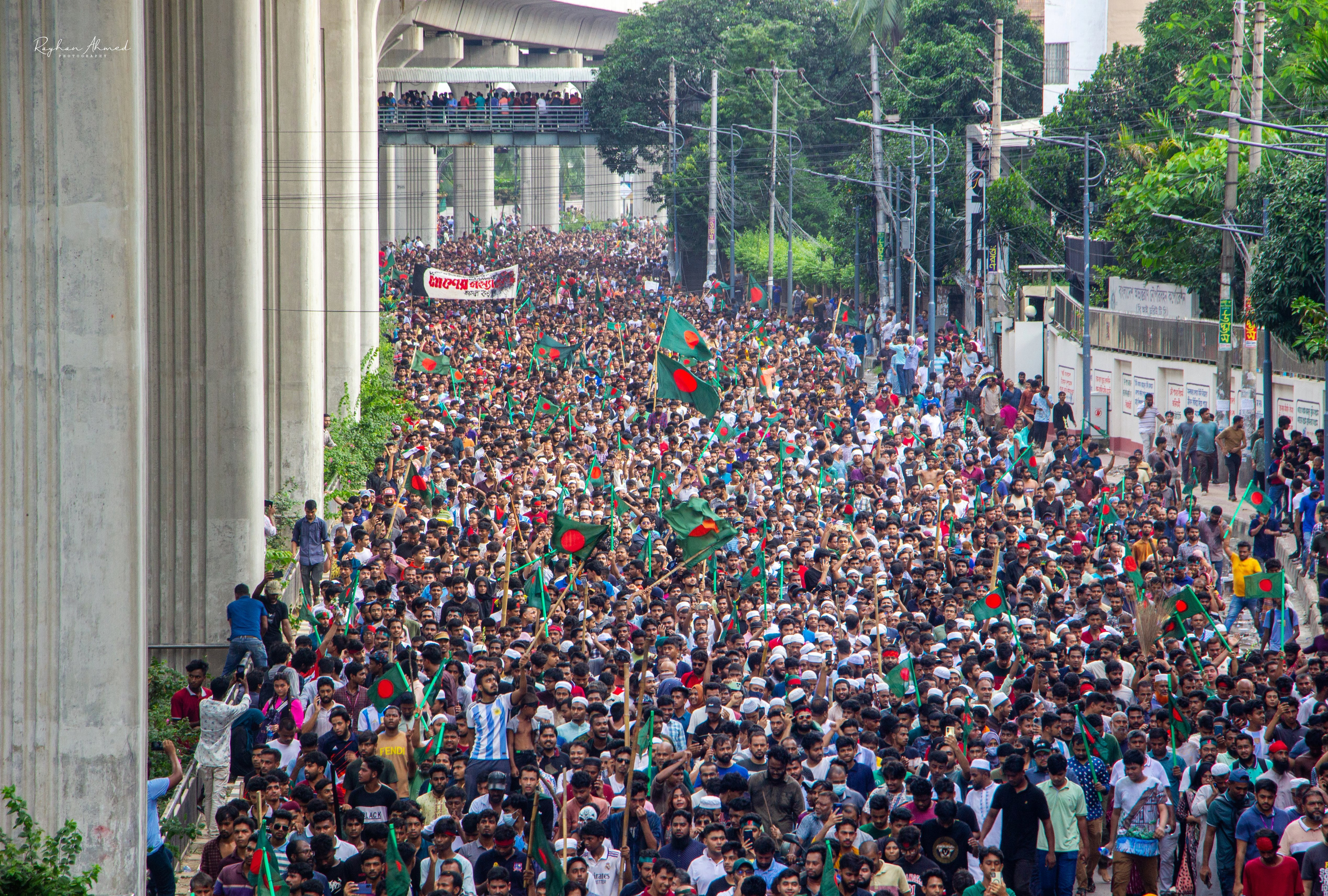
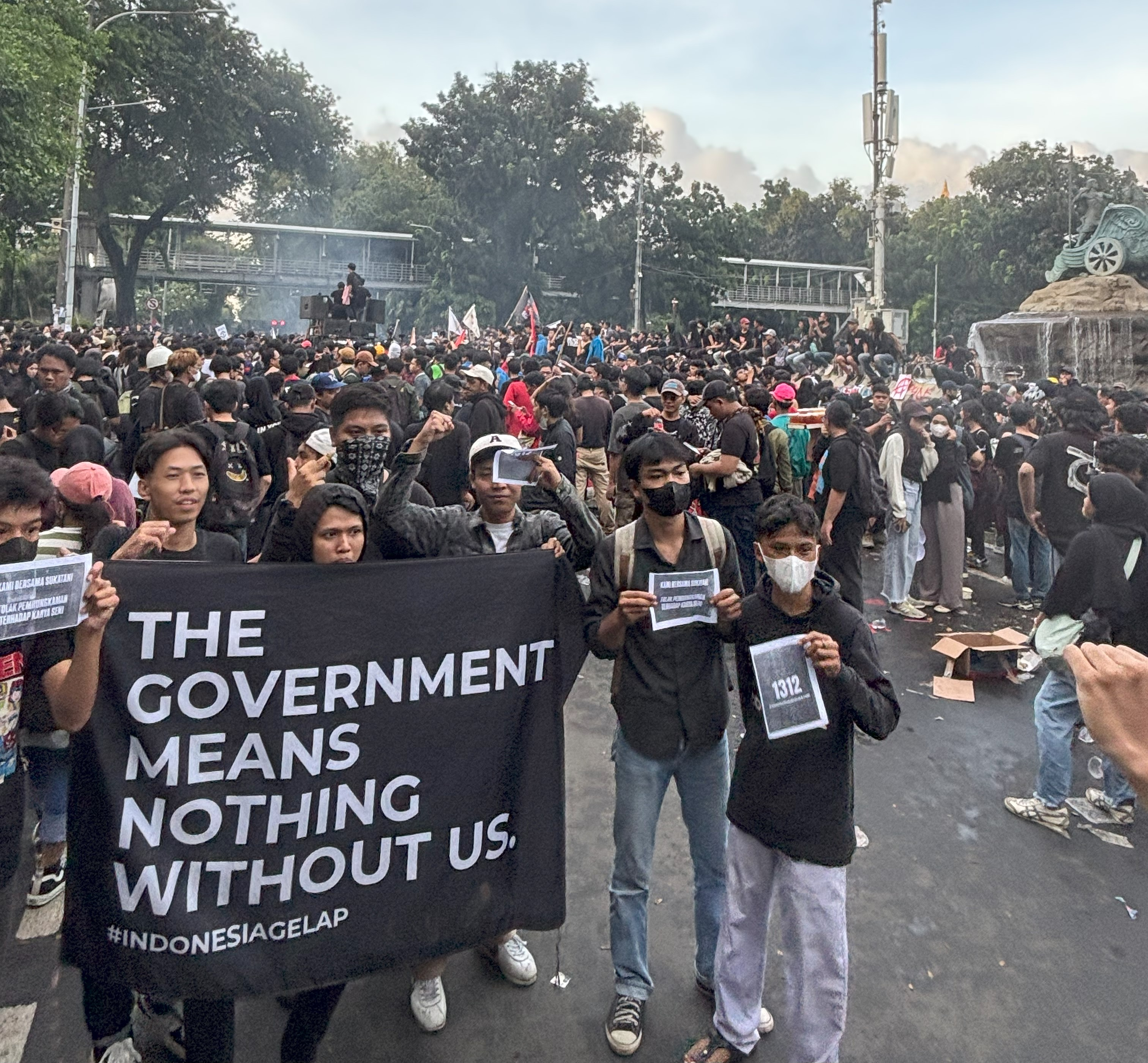
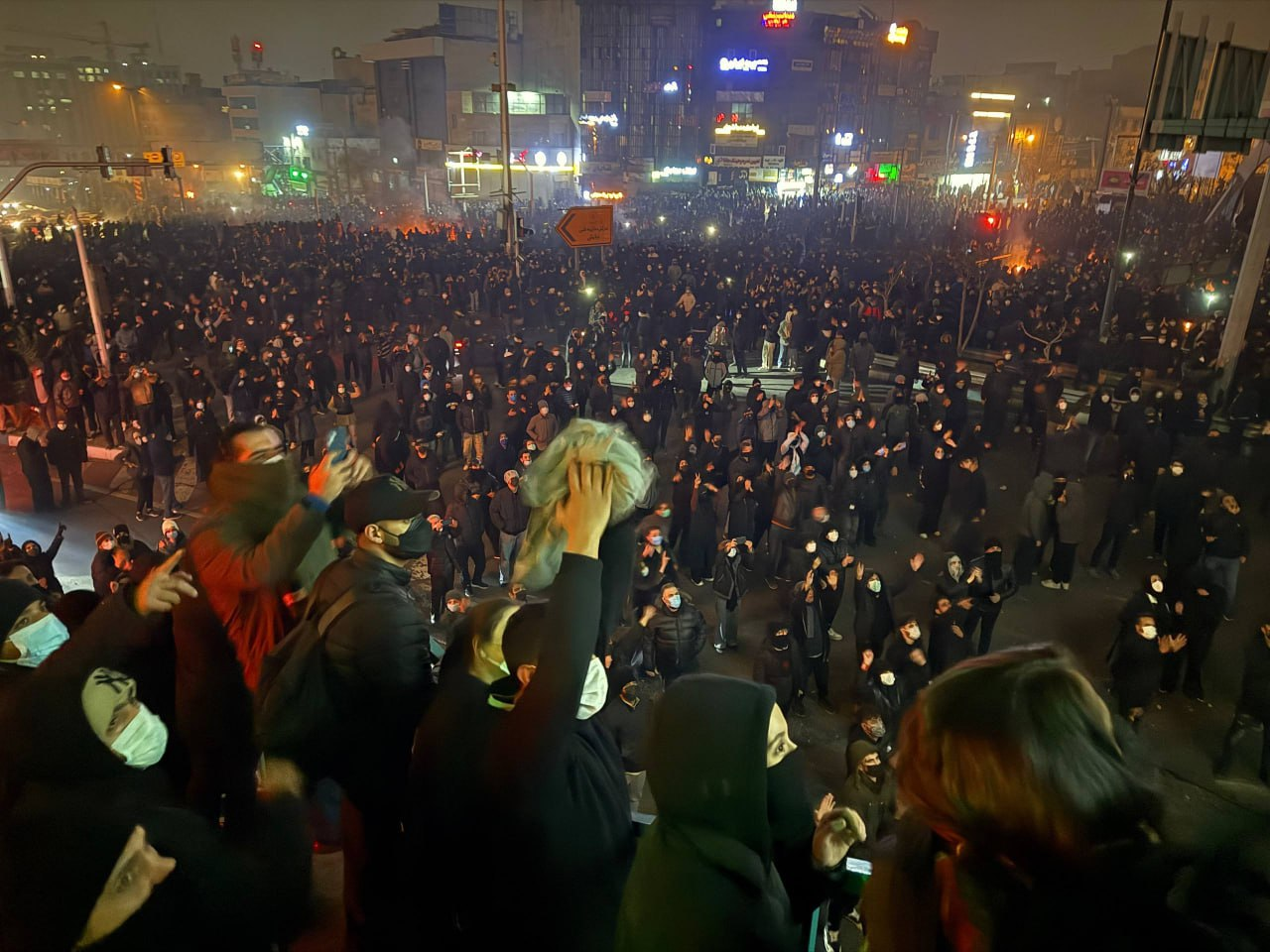
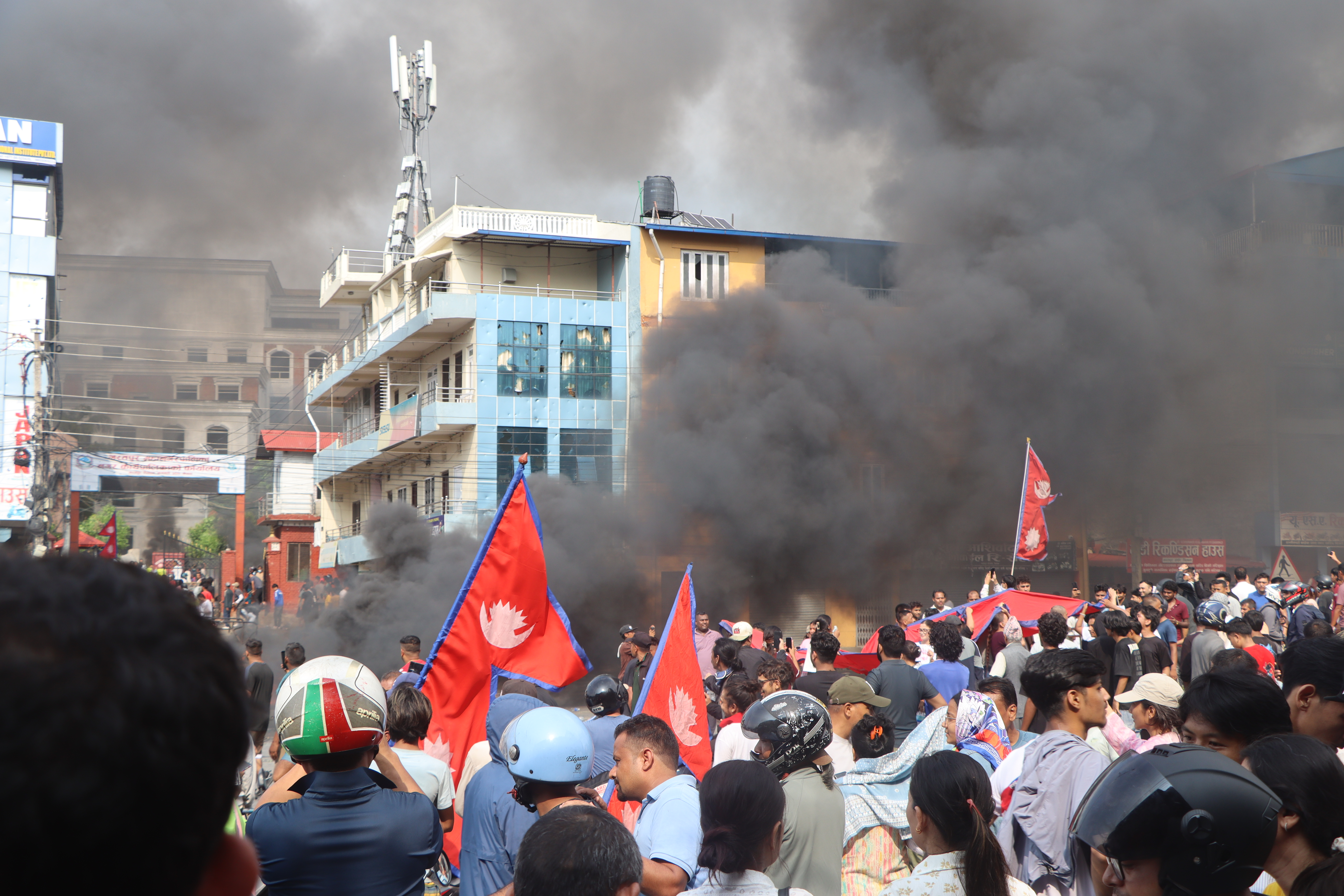
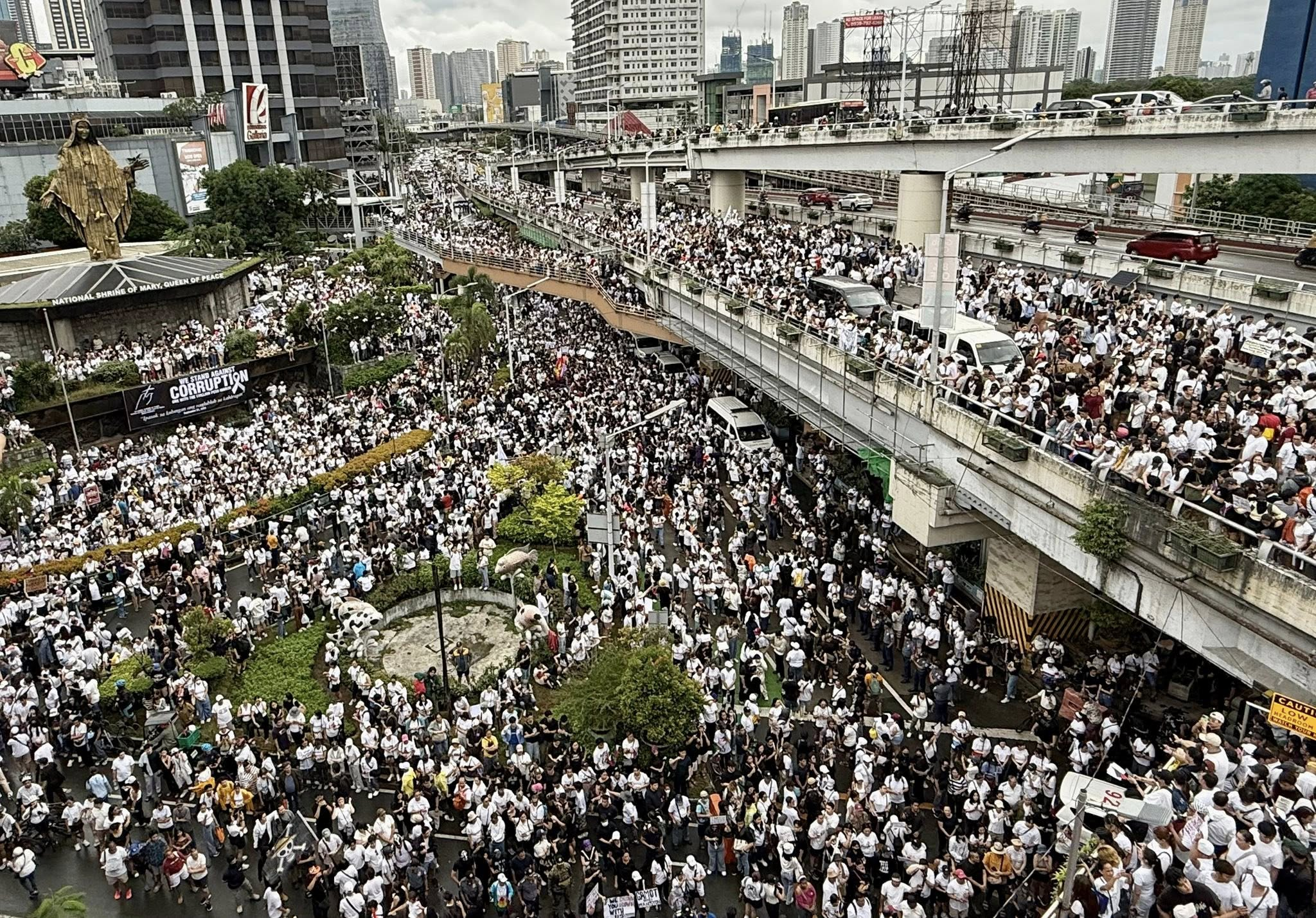
- Top-to-bottom, left-to-right: July Uprising, 2025 Indonesian protests, 2025–2026 Iranian protests, Nepalese Gen Z Protests, Trillion Peso March
- Date: 15 March 2019 – present
- Location: Asia (including Bangladesh, India, Indonesia, Iran, Malaysia, the Maldives, Mongolia, Nepal, the Philippines, Sri Lanka, and Timor-Leste)

Since the early 2020s, as part of worldwide Gen Z protests, a series of mostly Generation Z–led anti-government protests and uprisings have spread across Asia – most notably in South and Southeast Asia – with several leading to massive reforms and regime change. These protests began in response to widespread corruption, nepotism, economic inequality and financial mismanagement, authoritarianism, and democratic backsliding.

The protests in Bangladesh in 2024 are widely cited as the first successful "Gen Z" revolution in the world, which also popularized the term. However, Sri Lanka’s 2022 uprising is considered the first time that Gen Z toppled a national government. Generation Z–led protests in other Asian countries have since followed including Nepal, Indonesia, Malaysia, the Philippines, Timor-Leste, Maldives, Iran, Mongolia and India. Governments were overthrown in Bangladesh and Nepal; while protests in Indonesia, India and Timor-Leste achieved reversals of unpopular policies. (Note: Attributed to multiple sources:)

== Etymology ==
The term "Asian Spring" has been unofficially coined to describe these events, citing their similarities to the Arab Spring, though "Asian Uprising", "Gen Z protests", and "Gen Z revolutions" have also been used. Aditya Gowdara Shivamurthy used the term "South Asian Spring" for the Sri Lankan, Bangladeshi and Nepalese protests.

== Causes ==
=== Economic pressures ===
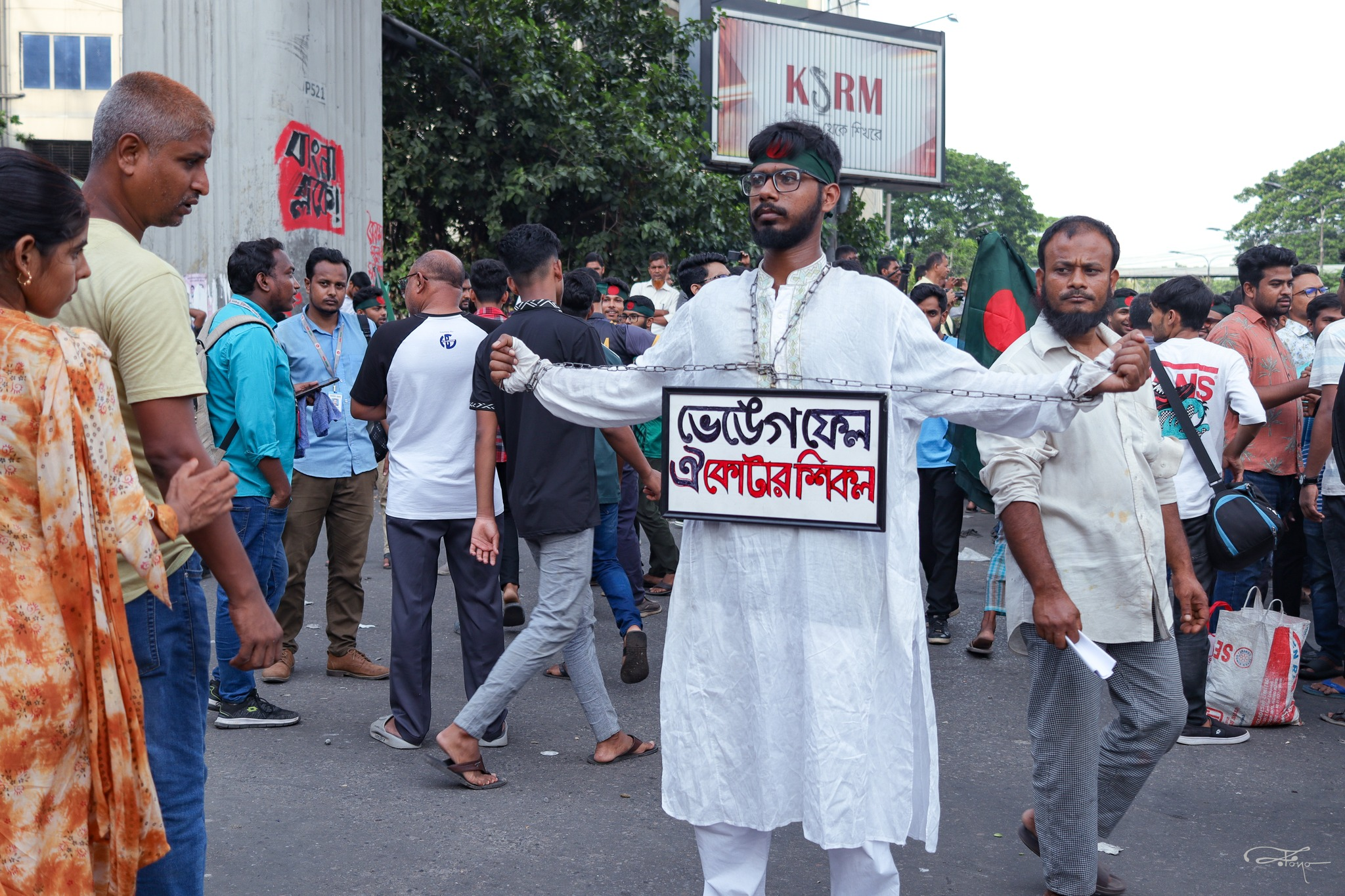
Bangladeshi student in shackles carrying a sign saying "Break down the shackles of those quotas" during 2024 quota reform movement, protesting a government job system seen as nepotistic and discriminatory.

A central factor uniting many Generation Z protest movements in Asia is economic hardship and limited opportunities. Large youth populations in several countries face high rates of unemployment and underemployment, alongside rising living costs, contributing to a sense of precarity. Scholars have described these conditions as leaving young people in "economically precarious" situations, struggling to secure stable employment or adequate wages. According to a 2024 six-country study by the ISEAS – Yusof Ishak Institute, "unemployment and recession" ranked as the most pressing concern among Southeast Asian youth, with 89% of respondents expressing worry, followed by the "widening socio-economic gap", cited by around 85%. Persistent income inequality, often compounded by corruption, has reinforced perceptions of injustice. Analysts have observed that recent youth uprisings in South Asia have been driven primarily by material hardship, with poverty, inflation, and unmet basic needs intensifying public frustration and contributing to broader social unrest. A 2025 Carnegie Endowment analysis similarly identified widening wealth gaps and concerns over a bleak economic future as factors fueling youth activism and demands for relief from deepening social and economic inequalities. For example, in Sri Lanka, the 2022 protest movement emerged amid severe economic turmoil marked by surging inflation, acute shortages of fuel and medicine, and prolonged power outages in the aftermath of its economic crisis. The collapse of the national economy severely disrupted livelihoods and caused daily hardship for much of the population. Many of the predominantly young protesters viewed the crisis as the result of long-term economic mismanagement and were motivated by basic concerns of survival; for much of Sri Lanka's youth, politics had come to represent a struggle for survival, dignity, and the right to be heard.

The persistent youth unemployment crisis has intensified these grievances. Despite post-COVID-19 pandemic economic recovery in some countries, stable and adequately paid jobs for young adults remain limited. Many members of Generation Z report feeling excluded from the benefits of economic growth, viewing it as a lost "demographic dividend'. In South Asia and parts of Southeast Asia, large youth populations have not been matched by sufficient employment opportunities, resulting in growing frustration when economic expansion fails to generate jobs or when young people are confined to informal, insecure, and poorly remunerated work. An August 2024 report by the International Labour Organization (ILO) observed that, although overall unemployment rates had improved following the COVID-19 pandemic, Asia-Pacific's economic anxieties among the youth continued to increase. Surveys cited in the report found that majorities of respondents expressed stress over job loss, job stability, and broader economic conditions, showing persistent uncertainty about their future prospects. Widespread economic precarity, compounded by rising costs of living for essentials such as fuel, food, and housing, has contributed to mounting dissatisfaction among Generation Z. In Nepal, youth anger crystallized around a viral image of a minister's son displaying luxury goods during an economic downturn, which was widely interpreted as emblematic of inequality in a country with a gross domestic product per capital below US$1,500 and where roughly four-fifths of the workforce is employed in the informal sector.

Socio-economic pressures have contributed to a perception among many members of Generation Z that they lack a secure future under existing conditions. In countries such as China, India, and across Southeast Asia, young people have reported being disproportionately affected by unaffordable housing and limited access to quality employment, often in contrast with the experiences of earlier generations. Public institutions are frequently viewed as unresponsive to youth unemployment and ineffective in addressing rising living costs, which bred cynicism and discontent. The weakening of upward mobility has left many young people frustrated, and such conditions have provided fertile ground for protest movements. When access to education, stable employment, and opportunities for advancement are perceived as unattainable, Generation Z has shown a greater willingness to engage in demonstrations to express grievances and demand change.

=== Nepotism and lawmaker perks ===
During a break in the 2025 Annual Session of the DPR and DPD RI, several members of parliament were shown dancing, which drew mass criticism from netizens amid economic hardship (15 August 2025).

Generation Z protests in several Asian countries have also been characterized as uprisings against entrenched elite rule, reflecting frustration with decades of corruption, quotaism, nepotism, and oligarchic dominance. Across South Asia, many young protesters have explicitly targeted what they describe as powerful political dynasties and a wealthy, discredited elite, whom they blame for undermining democracy and economic opportunity.

In Sri Lanka, the Rajapaksa family's long-standing political dominance was a central target of the 2022 protests. Over the years, members of the family occupied key positions in government two brothers alternated as president and prime minister, another served as speaker of parliament, and several relatives held senior posts, prompting widespread accusations of nepotism and corruption. The resulting concentration of power was widely associated with policy mismanagement that contributed to the country's economic collapse. The Aragalaya protests were therefore viewed not only as a demand for President Gotabaya Rajapaksa's resignation but as a broader revolt against systemic corruption and elite capture, with participants calling for a "system change" and an end to cronyism and graft.

A comparable event unfolded in Bangladesh during the 2024 youth-led movement known as the "Student–People's Revolution." Initially triggered by opposition to a government job quota reserving 30% of civil service positions for certain groups, including descendants of war veterans, the protests reflected broader dissatisfaction with what participants saw as nepotistic and exclusionary governance. Demonstrators denounced corruption, favoritism, and what they perceived as an increasingly authoritarian and kleptocratic political system. Their demands soon expanded beyond the quota issue to calls for merit-based recruitment, free elections, and an end to political elitism. On social media and in the streets, Bangladeshi students condemned nepotism embedded in the reinstated civil-service quota that reserved 30% of jobs for descendants of independence fighters, arguing it disproportionately favored ruling-party loyalists and shut out merit amid high youth unemployment.

In Indonesia, student and youth-led protests in late August 2025 zeroed in on lawmakers' perks, mainly especially a Rp50 million/month housing allowance reportedly paid to all 580 DPR Parliament members since September 2024, triggering clashes outside Parliament in Jakarta on 25 August and spotlighting anger over elite privilege amid economic strain and youth unemployment. The allowance's legal basis had been set out earlier in the DPR letter which became a focal point in media and legal explainers as demonstrators pressed for repeal. On the onset of the killing of Affan Kurniawan, a deadly week of unrest, and the looting of houses owned by rich lawmakers, the law on controversial perks was revoked and overseas trips curbed by president Prabowo under a move that was framed as a response to the mounting death toll and public outrage. Echoing the region's "perks" backlash, mid-September 2025 in Timor-Leste, thousands of mostly university students rallied in Dili against a budget item to buy 65 Toyota Prado SUVs for its MPs (about US$4.2 million in total). The protests then pivoted to a broader demand to scrap lifetime pensions perks for lawmakers (and some senior officials). Timorense youth protesters explicitly framed MPs as "self-serving" with lavish perks (US$4.2m for 65 SUVs and lifetime pensions) and marching with banners like "Stop thieves/stop corrupters," which cast lawmakers' perks as greedy and illegitimate in one of the region's poorest countries and issues of high inequality, malnutrition and unemployment.

In Nepal, youth-led protests focused on what demonstrators described as entrenched political elites and a pervasive culture of corruption and privilege. Protesters criticized officials' perks and allowances and railed against nepotism, alleging that positions and advantages go to friends and family rather than on merit. Public outrage intensified after reports circulated that the teenage daughter of a senior official had been chauffeured in a government vehicle that struck and injured a schoolgirl, an incident that became emblematic of perceptions that the "children of political elites" acted with impunity. In Kathmandu, students carried school textbooks during demonstrations to symbolize the perceived futility of education in a system dominated by nepotism, expressing frustration that hard work and merit were often overshadowed by political connections. The motif fed a broader sentiment that meritocracy has been undermined by patronage, deepening generational anger. Analysts link this unrest to long-standing elite capture and insufficient inclusive development, while Gen-Z protesters cast their movement as a challenge to "business as usual" politics that benefits political power and resources to benefit a privileged few at the expense of the wider public.

In India, the youth led protests by the satirical group Cockroach Janata Party focused primarily on the NEET-UG exam paper leak in 2026 along with corruption, nepotism and leaks of other government exams. The protests also called for the resignation of the Ex Education Minister Dharmendra Pradhan, who resigned on 25th July 2025 due to mounting pressure from protesters. The key figures in the protest were Abhijeet Dipke, the founder of CJP and the climate activist Sonam Wangchuk. Wangchuk led a hunger strike for 27 days as well. After the resignation of Pradhan and acceptance by the government of all the points made by CJP, the protests were called off.

=== Corruption and distrust ===
A map of all countries surveyed by Transparency International's Corruption Perceptions Index.: 90–100 80–89 70–79 60–69 50–59 40–49 / 30–39 20–29 10–19 0–9 No Data

A significant motivator for Generation Z protests is discontent with corruption, nepotism, and the perceived entrenchment of political elites. Across Asia, many young people view their governments as dominated by longstanding elites who retain power and wealth while ordinary citizens face economic challenges. Analysts note that frustration with corruption is particularly pronounced among members of Generation Z, who held more interest of scandals and displays of excess among political leaders. This has contributed to what some observers describe as a widening gap between young people and public institutions, as youth express declining trust in elites seen as prioritizing self-enrichment over public service.

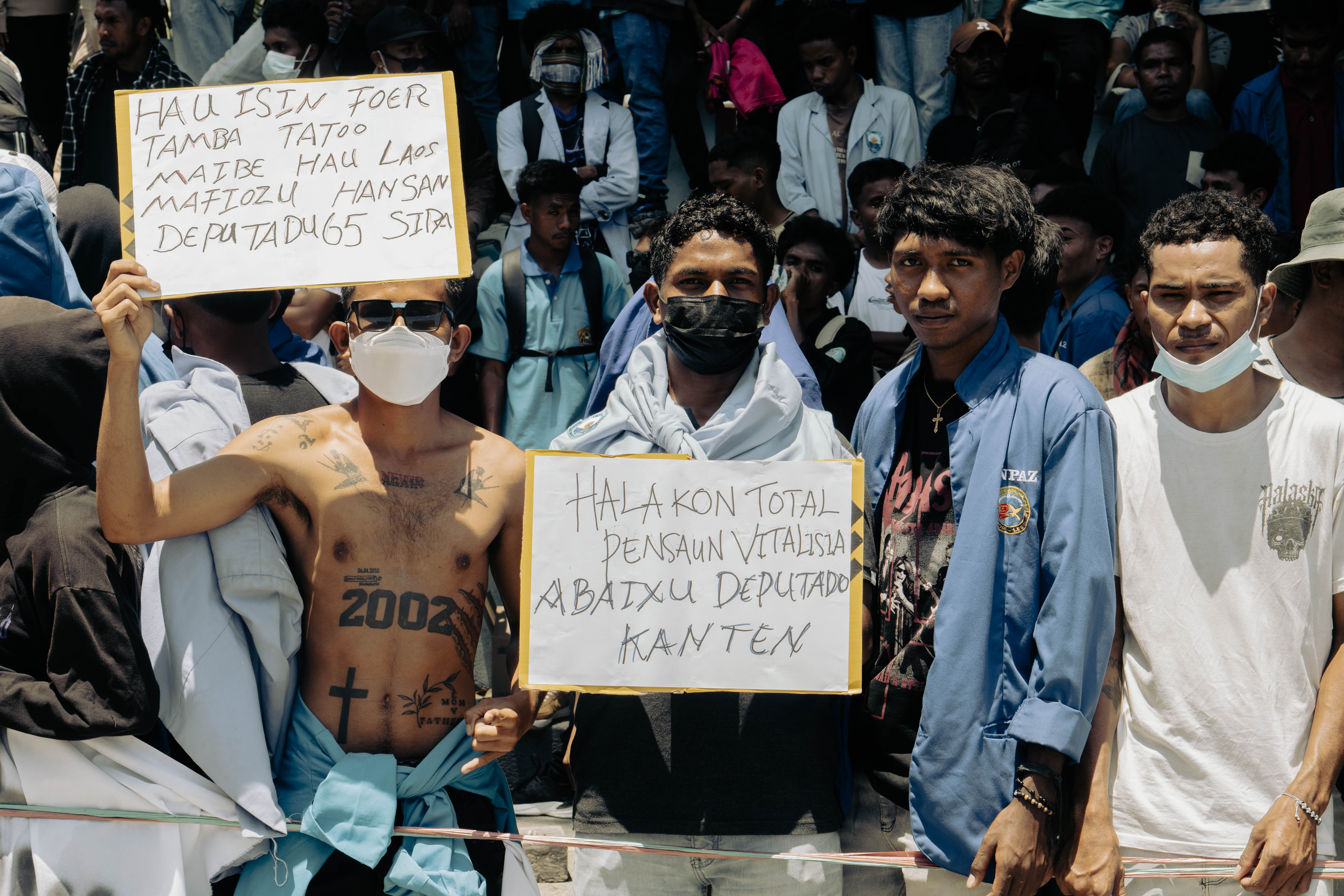
Timorense youth protestors. Left: "I'm ugly because of the tattoos, but I'm not a mafioso like the 65 MPs." Right: "Abolish the lifetime pension completely, down with the greedy MPs."

Generation Z protests have also been driven by declining trust in government institutions and frustration with governance failures. Government inefficiency, unresponsive bureaucracies, and heavy-handed crackdowns have contributed to a perception among youth that existing systems are ineffective or broken. Studies have noted a "collective lack of trust" among young people in Asia regarding political and economic institutions' ability to address their concerns in a timely or effective way. Leaders are often perceived as failing to provide adequate public services, employment, or justice except to well-connected groups. Government responses to peaceful dissent through repression or violence have further eroded legitimacy. Recent South Asian uprisings has concluded that harsh state crackdowns represented "fatal miscalculations" that intensified youth mobilization. For example, protests in Sri Lanka in 2022 and Bangladesh in 2024 escalated after authorities' responses were seen to have ruptured the social contract and undermined remaining trust. In parts of Southeast Asia, authoritarian or semi-authoritarian governance has provoked youth-led movements calling for democracy and civil liberties. Observers note that while earlier generations may have tolerated restrictions on political freedoms, many young people today reject authoritarian and dynastic systems that they view as jeopardizing their rights. A Kadence International survey notes that less than half of youths in Southeast Asia (49%) trust their governments, with trust levels significantly lower in some countries (only ~42% in Malaysia, for instance). Whilst the ISEAS – Yusof Ishak Institute documents sustained youth activism online/offline and stark cross-country gaps in satisfaction with the political system, with Indonesia 71.5% and the Philippines 61.4% being the most dissatisfied with their governments in Southeast Asia; directly linking optimism/trust to issues like transparency and corruption. Scholars have described these movements as part of a broader generational struggle, with youth activists explicitly resisting oligarchic and authoritarian norms across the region.

In several countries, Generation Z has expressed the view that political leadership is dominated by gerontocratic elites who are perceived as disconnected from younger generations. Public institutions are often seen as "bastions of well-connected insiders" focused on preserving power rather than addressing youth concerns. This has contributed to what analysts describe as a crisis of confidence, with many young Asians regarding their governments as lacking transparency and accountability. According to the United Nations Development Programme, the rise in youth activism has emerged as a response to this erosion of trust, with young people demanding a greater role in shaping decisions that affect their future. The UNDP further observes that governments' failure to incorporate youth perspectives or respond to their grievances diminishes institutional credibility. In contexts where governance is perceived as ineffective or unjust, and formal avenues for redress appear inaccessible, protest has become a key means for Generation Z to demand accountability and reform.

== Precursor protests ==
=== Hong Kong ===
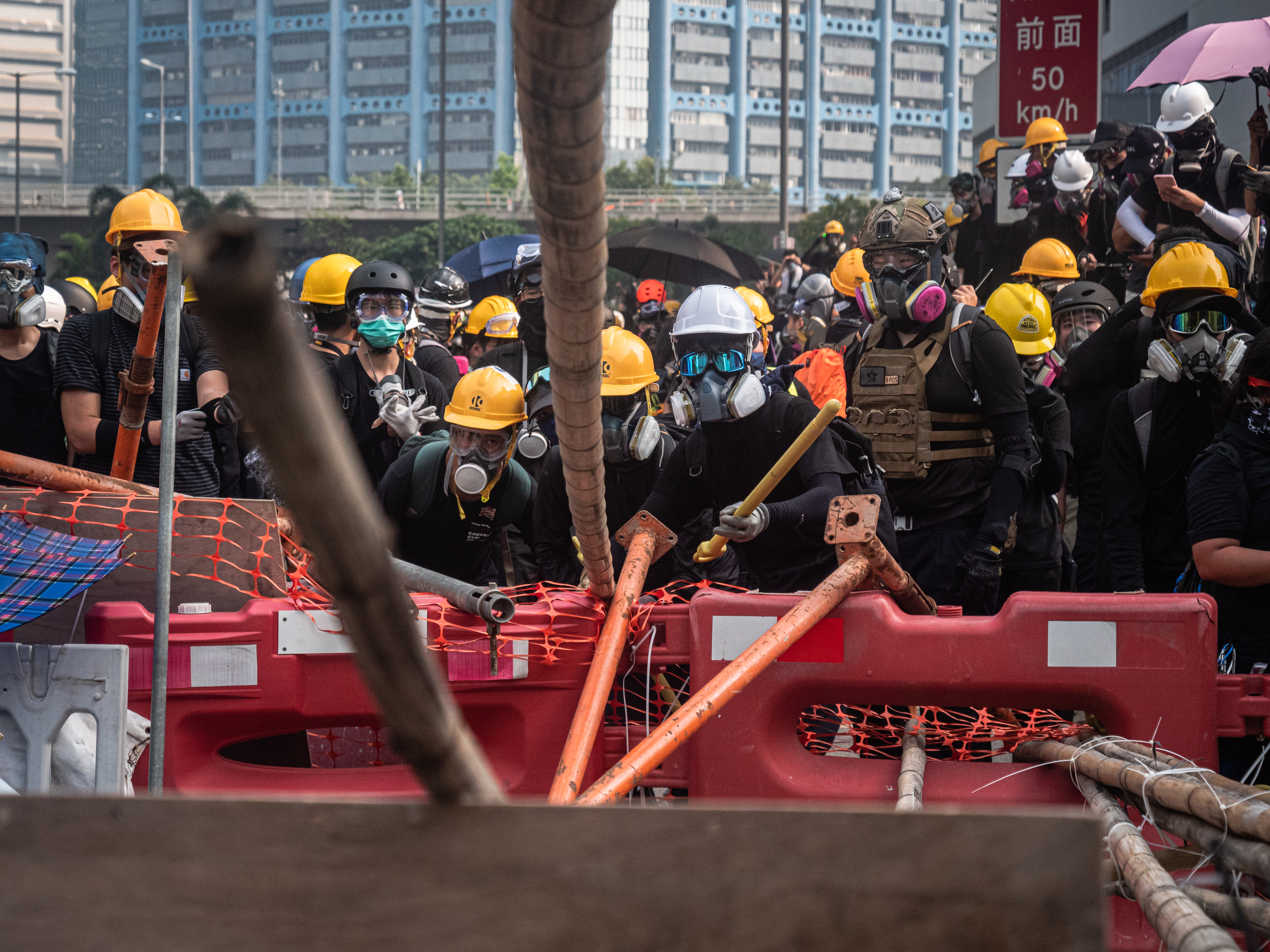
Protesters adopted the black bloc method and wore helmets and respirators to protect themselves. Yellow hard hats became a symbol for the protest movement.

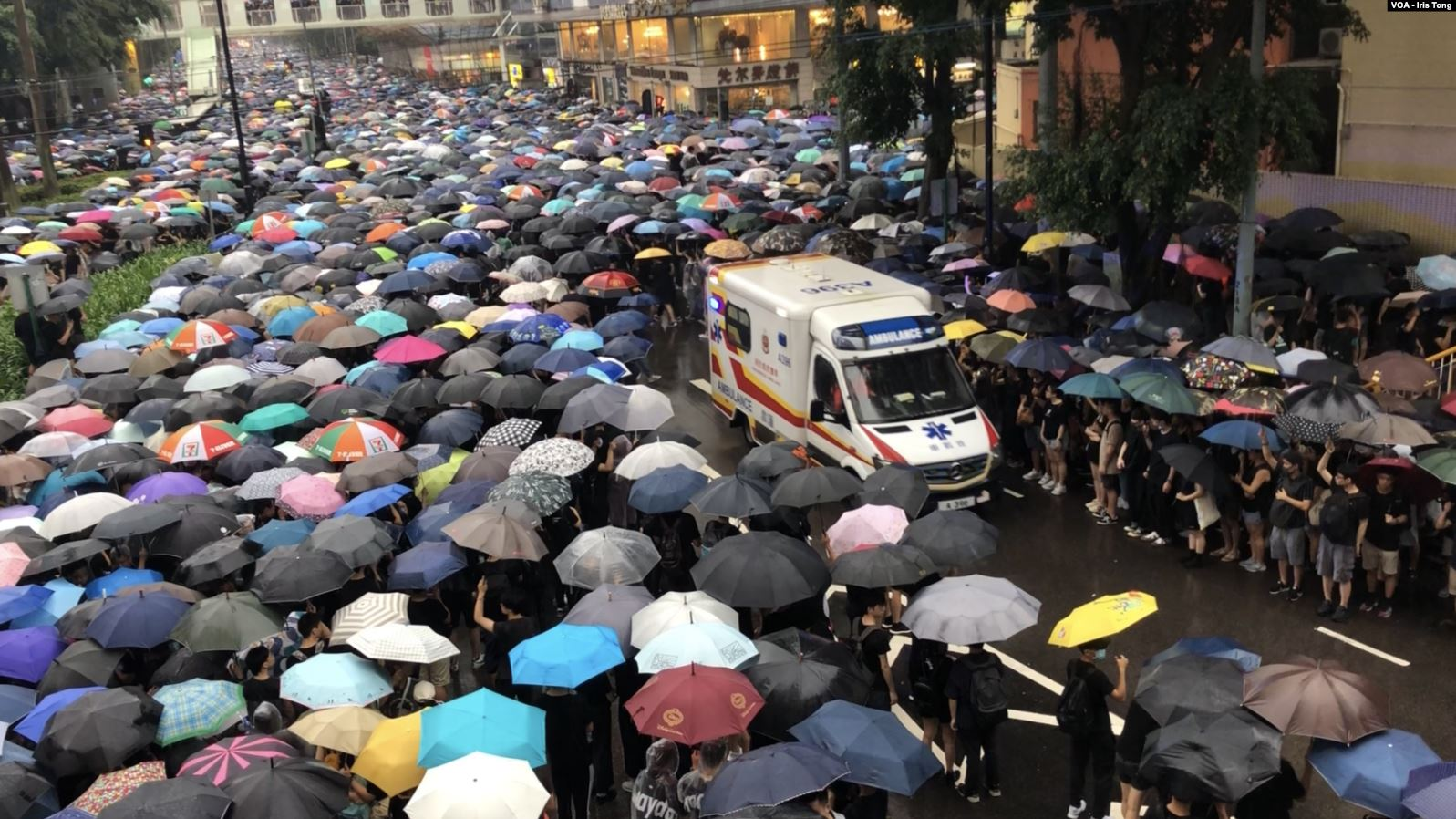
Hong Kong anti-extradition bill protesters using umbrellas make way for an ambulance, 2019

From 2019 until 2020, protests were held in Hong Kong in response to the Hong Kong government's introduction of a bill to amend the Fugitive Offenders Ordinance in regard to extradition. It was the largest series of demonstrations in the history of Hong Kong.

The bill would allow criminal suspects to be extradited on a case-by-case basis to any jurisdiction without pre-existing extradition treaties with Hong Kong, including mainland China. It was feared that this bill would erode Hong Kong's autonomy, raising concerns due to China's history of political repression.

The protests began with a sit-in at the government headquarters on 15 March 2019 and a demonstration attended by hundreds of thousands on 9 June 2019, followed by a gathering outside the Legislative Council Complex on 12 June which stalled the bill's second reading. On 16 June, just one day after the Hong Kong government suspended the bill, a larger protest took place to push for its complete withdrawal. The protest was also in response to the perceived excessive use of force by the Hong Kong Police Force on 12 June. As the protests progressed, activists laid out five key demands. Police inaction during the 2019 Yuen Long attack and brutality in 2019 Prince Edward station attack further escalated the protests.‌

Chief Executive Carrie Lam withdrew the bill on 4 September, but refused to concede to the other four demands. A month later, she invoked emergency powers to implement an anti-mask law, escalating the confrontations. The storming of the Legislative Council in July 2019, deaths of Chow Tsz-lok and Luo Changqing, one of whom was unarmed, and sieges of the Chinese University and the Polytechnic University in November 2019 were landmark events. The unprecedented landslide victory of the pro-democracy camp in the November local election was widely regarded as a de facto referendum on the city's governance.

The outbreak of the COVID-19 pandemic in Hong Kong in early 2020 largely silenced the protests. Tensions mounted again in May 2020 after Beijing's decision to promulgate a national security bill for Hong Kong. By mid-2020, the Hong Kong government had declared the restoration of peace and stability with the imposition of the national security law. More than a hundred people, including several prominent activists, have been arrested since the imposition of the law. The resulting political atmosphere, along with the crackdown on civil society, sparked a wave of mass emigration from the city.

The approval ratings of the government and the police plunged to their lowest points since the 1997 handover. The Central People's Government alleged that foreign powers were instigating the conflict, although the protests have been largely described as "leaderless". The United States passed the Hong Kong Human Rights and Democracy Act on 27 November 2019 in response to the movement. The tactics and methods used in Hong Kong inspired other protests that followed worldwide.

=== Thailand ===
The 2020–2021 Thai protests stemmed from democratic and economic regression since the 2014 Thai coup d'état and encompassed issues such as human rights abuses, political corruption scandals, distrust of the 2019 general election, expansion of royal prerogative and lèse-majesté. The protests, including calls for constitutional amendment, ultimately failed after a "severe" state of emergency was declared in Bangkok from 15 to 22 October 2020 with the street protests largely dying down. The Thai government created an unelected House of Lords and the Constitutional Court ruled that proposing a reform of the monarchy is unconstitutional and amounts to acting to overthrow it.

=== Sri Lanka ===
The Aragalaya (''The Struggle''), was a series of mass protests that began in March 2022 against the government of Sri Lanka. The government was heavily criticized for mismanaging the Sri Lankan economy, which led to a subsequent economic crisis involving severe inflation, daily blackouts, and a shortage of fuel, domestic gas, and other essential goods. The protesters' main demand was the resignation of president Gotabaya Rajapaksa and key officials from the Rajapaksa family. Despite the involvement of several opposition parties, most protesters considered themselves to be apolitical, with many expressing discontent with the parliamentary opposition. Protesters chanted slogans such as "Go Home Gota", "Go Home Rajapaksas", and "Aragalayata Jaya Wewa" ("Victory to the struggle"). Most protests were organized by the general public, with youths playing a major part by carrying out protests at Galle Face Green.

The government reacted to the protests with authoritarian methods, such as declaring a state of emergency, allowing the military to arrest civilians, imposing curfews, and restricting access to social media. The government violated the law and the Sri Lankan constitution by attempting to suppress the protests. The Sri Lankan diaspora also began demonstrations against the suppression of basic human rights in the country. In April, the government's ban on social media was perceived to have backfired; hashtags such as #GoHomeGota, which is believed to have been coined by an activist called Pathum Kerner in December 2021, had begun trending on Twitter internationally. The government's ban was lifted later that day. The Human Rights Commission of Sri Lanka condemned the government's actions and summoned officials responsible for the blocking and abuse of protesters.

On 3 April, all 26 members of the Second Gotabaya Rajapaksa cabinet resigned with the exception of prime minister Mahinda Rajapaksa. Critics said that the resignation was not valid as they did not follow constitutional protocol and several of the ministers who "resigned" were reinstated in different ministries the next day. Chief government whip Johnston Fernando insisted that President Gotabaya Rajapaksa would not resign under any circumstances. The protests, however, led to the removal of officials and ministers, including members of the Rajapaksa family and their close associates, and to the appointment of more qualified and veteran officials and the creation of the Advisory Group on Multilateral Engagement and Debt Sustainability.

On 9 July 2022, protesters occupied the President's House in Colombo, causing Rajapaksa to flee and prime minister Ranil Wickremesinghe to announce his own willingness to resign. About a week later, on 20 July, the parliament elected Wickremesinghe as President. By November 2022, the protests had largely cooled off due to improvement in economic conditions. While the protests were mostly over, it was noted that it would take until 2026 for full economic recovery to be achieved.

== Protest movements by country ==
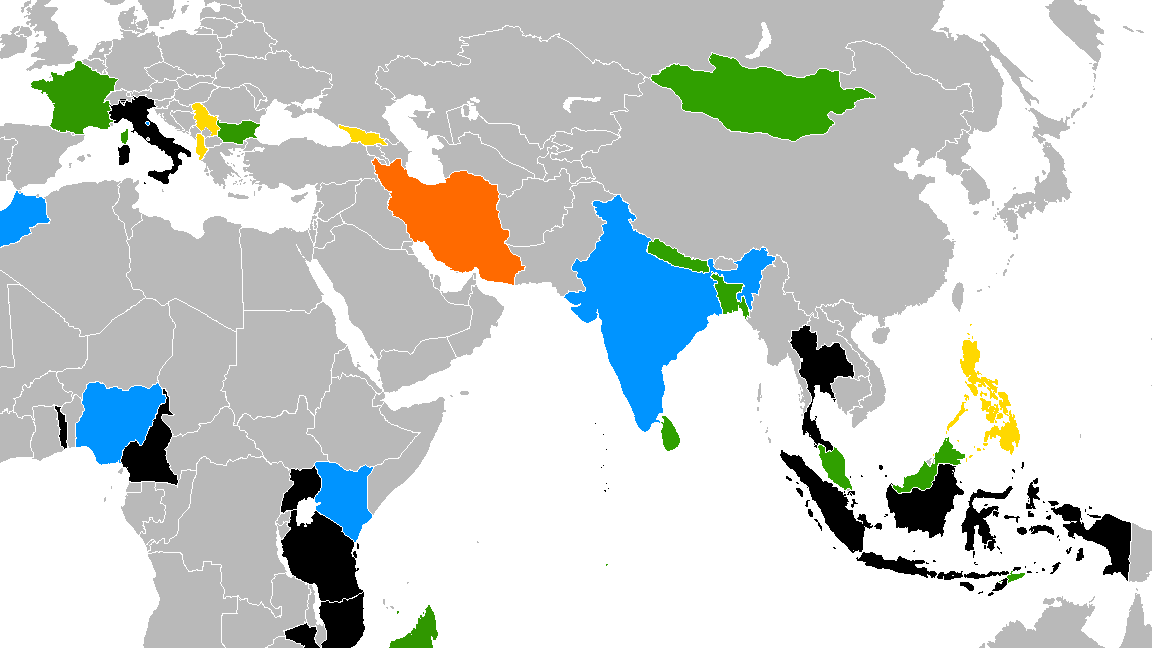
Ongoing protests Successful protests, government overthrown or changed Successful protests, government applied the desired reform Countries where protests are in a new phase of development following the failure of the previous one(s) Failed protests

=== Bangladesh ===
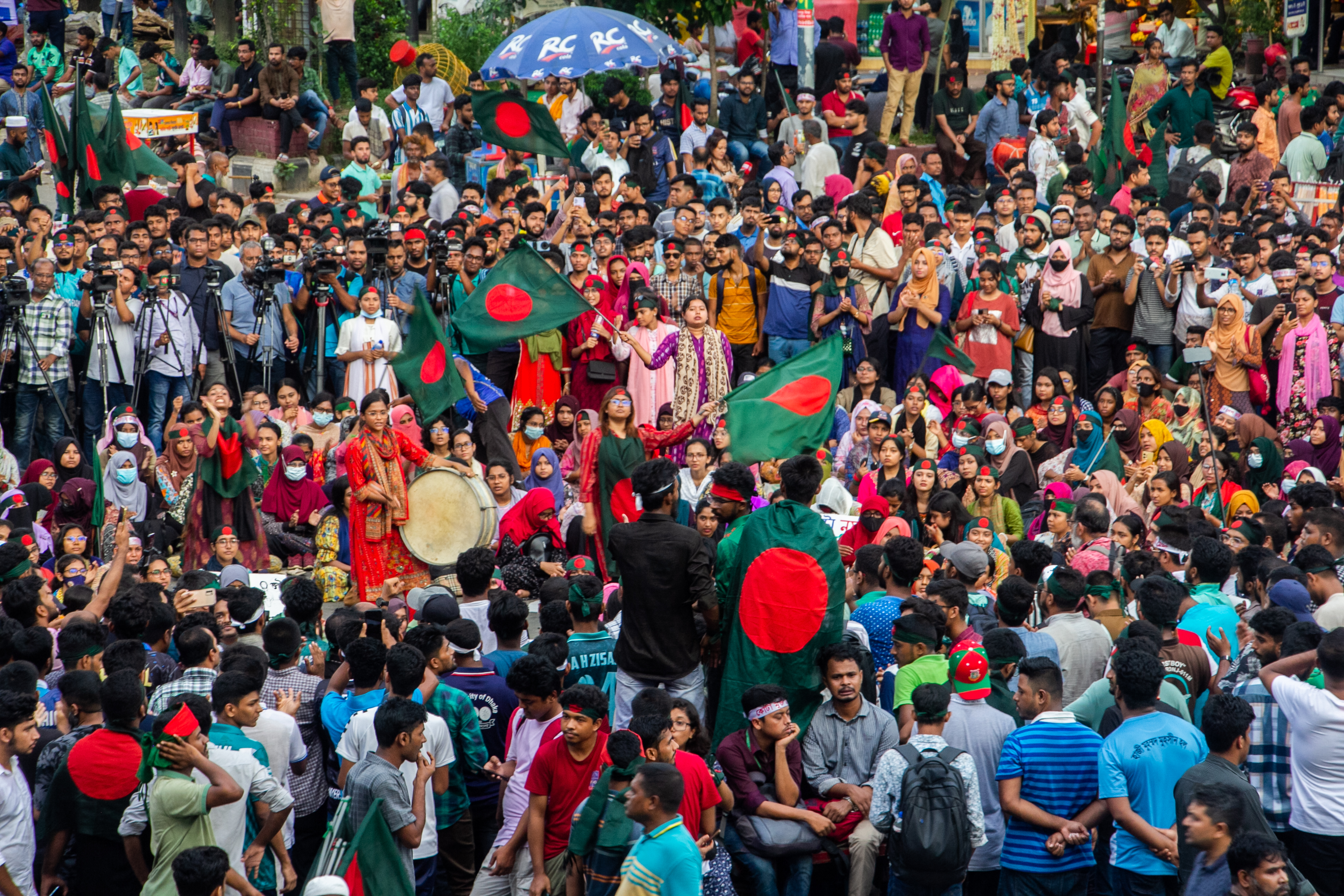
A group of students demonstrating in the quota reform movement in Shahbag, Dhaka

The July Uprising, also known as the July Mass Uprising, Gen Z revolution, or the Student-People's Uprising, was a mass uprising in Bangladesh in 2024. Coinciding with the first anniversary of the resignation of Sheikh Hasina, on 5 August 2025, the uprising received constitutional acknowledgment with the announcement of the July Declaration, and it has been described as the world's first Gen Z revolution.

It began as the 2024 Bangladesh quota reform movement in early June 2024, spearheaded primarily by university students such as the Students Against Discrimination, after the Supreme Court of Bangladesh reinstated a 30% quota for descendants of freedom fighters, reversing the government decision made in response to the 2018 Bangladesh quota reform movement. Students began to feel that they had a limited opportunity based on merit. Initially focused on restructuring quota-based systems for government job recruitment, the movement expanded against what many perceived as an authoritarian government when government-associated groups carried out the July massacre of protestors and civilians, most of whom were students.

The protest quickly spread throughout the entire country because of the government's violent response, as well as growing public dissatisfaction against an oppressive government. The situation was further complicated by many other socio-economic and political issues, like the government's inability to manage a prolonged economic downturn, reports of rampant corruption and human rights violations, the absence of democratic channels for initiating changes, and increasing authoritarianism and democratic backsliding.

Amnesty International blamed Hasina's government's "heavy-handed response" for causing the death of "students, journalists, and bystanders" and demanded that the Hasina-led "government of Bangladesh urgently end this repression." Human Rights Watch had also called on foreign governments to urge Hasina to "end the use of excessive force against protesters and hold troops to account for human rights abuses." HRW's deputy Asia director had also highlighted "unfettered security force abuses against anyone who opposes the Sheikh Hasina government."

The government sought to suppress the protests by shutting down all educational institutions. They deployed their student wing, the Chhatra League, along with other factions of the Awami League party. These groups resorted to using firearms and sharp weapons against the demonstrators. The government then deployed Police, RAB, BGB and other armed forces, declaring a nationwide shoot-at-sight curfew amid an unprecedented government-ordered nationwide internet and mobile connectivity blackout that effectively isolated Bangladesh from the rest of the world. Later, the government also blocked social media in Bangladesh. Government forces cordoned off parts of the capital city of Dhaka and conducted block raids, randomly picking up anyone they suspected of having links to the protest, causing fear among the city's residents. As of August 2, there were 215 confirmed deaths, more than 20,000 injuries, and more than 11,000 arrests. The unofficial death toll was between 300 and 500. UNICEF reported that at least 32 children were killed during July's protests, with many more injured and detained. Determining the exact number of deaths has been difficult because the government reportedly restricted hospitals from sharing information with the media without police permission, hospital CCTV footage was confiscated, and numerous individuals with gunshot wounds were buried without identification.

The Awami League government suggested that political opponents had co-opted the protest. Despite the curfew restrictions the movement expanded its demands to include accountability for violence, a ban on the Chhatra League, and resignation of certain government officials, including the resignation of prime minister Hasina.

The government's use of widespread violence against the general public turned the student protest into the non-cooperation movement by early August. Whose sole demand of was the resignation of prime minister Hasina and her cabinet.

On 3 August 2024, coordinators of the Students Against Discrimination announced a one-point demand for the resignations and called for "comprehensive non-cooperation". The following day, violent clashes broke out, resulting in the deaths of 97 people, including students. The coordinators called for a long march to Dhaka to force Hasina out of power on 5 August. That day, a large crowd of protesters made its way through the capital. At around 3:00 p.m. (UTC+6), Hasina resigned and fled to India. Widespread celebrations and violence occurred following her removal. Hasina's ouster triggered a constitutional crisis, leading to the formation of an interim government led by economist Muhammad Yunus, as the chief adviser.

=== India ===
A series of demonstrations took place in Jantar Mantar, New Delhi, India, between 6 June and 25 July 2026. They were initiated by the Cockroach Janta Party (CJP), an Indian youth-based satirical political movement, along with left-wing student organisations including the All India Students Federation, All India Students Association, and Students' Federation of India. Held primarily at Jantar Mantar in New Delhi, the protesters have demanded the resignation of Union Education Minister Dharmendra Pradhan over irregularities in several of that year's national examinations — the 2026 NEET paper leak and the CBSE On-Screen Marking irregularities — along with broader reforms in the conduct of public examinations. The CJP, along with the Congress party, also sought compensation for the families of students who died by suicide due to the examination turmoil. The agitation drew national attention after activist Sonam Wangchuk began an indefinite hunger strike at the protest site on 28 June.

The CJP had been created in May 2026 by digital communications strategist Abhijeet Dipke as a political satire, alluding to a statement by Surya Kant, the Chief Justice of India, who compared unemployed youth and social media activists to "cockroaches" and "parasites". Having gained widespread online popularity, the movement transitioned into offline demonstrations, which were initially permitted by the Delhi Police.

On 28 June 2026, Ladakhi environmentalist and education activist Sonam Wangchuk joined the demonstration at Jantar Mantar. He started an indefinite hunger strike and demanded the resignation of Dharmendra Pradhan.

In mid-July 2026, following a leadership change in the Delhi Police, police removed barricades at the protest site and transferred Wangchuk to a hospital, a move organisers claimed was done against his will. This action, along with an incident where a woman who chanted Hindutva slogans and threw ink at Dipke, drew increased media attention to the agitation.

On 20 July, thousands of protesters, comprising primarily students and Gen Z congregants, gathered near Jantar Mantar, defying orders from the Delhi Police to disperse, and began to march toward Parliament. Clashes ensued, with police using baton charges and tear gas against protesters in an attempt to prevent them from reaching the Parliament, where the monsoon session was underway. International media outlets, including France 24 and CNN, described the protests as the largest demonstrations against the country's government in several years, while the Delhi Police stated their actions were necessary to maintain public order. Following the police response, CJP leaders announced the movement would not organise further street marches in the capital, though the sit-in at Jantar Mantar and the campaign for Pradhan's resignation would continue.

Following the crackdown, the Delhi Police dismantled the protesters' tents at the designated site, though demonstrators quickly began rebuilding their camps amidst rain and rubble.

On 23 July 2026, Wangchuk ended his hunger strike after the government assured him that no legal action would be taken against protesters rallying at Jantar Mantar site, a discussion would be held on preventing paper leaks in future and compensation would be given to students who committed suicide. Pradhan resigned on 25 July 2026. The protests were called off later in the day after the government agreed to the CJP's demands.

=== Indonesia ===
Some regard the 2025–2026 Indonesian protests as part of a larger Asian Spring primarily led by the youth (primarily from Generation Z) and the student movement. Indonesian pro-democracy and youth protestors often pinpoint the origins of the protest wave to the 2025 Pati demonstrations as the "Start of the Revolution" and as the larger impetus that led to the August 2025 protests. Whilst, the use of the Straw Hat Pirates' Jolly Roger during mass protests first appeared during the time of the demonstrations. Causes of the protests include a state and regional budget cut law, House of Representatives (DPR) allowance hike, economic frustration, police brutality and general opposition to the current government of Prabowo Subianto.

On 10 August 2025, the demonstrations similarly criticized the Rural and Urban Land and Building Tax (Pajak Bumi dan Bangunan Perdesaan dan Perkotaan, or PBB-P2) by up to 250%, the first increase in 14 years. Local authorities argued this was a maximum cap and that many properties would see smaller hikes (some only 50%). However, residents feared the sharp tax rise would burden the community and protested that the policy was decided without sufficient public input. Public outcry later boiled when the regent of Pati challenged dissenters to protest which was widely viewed as provocative and insensitive, reinforcing perceptions of an arrogant leadership amidst pressure of the tax hike. Whilst largely a plural farmer protest, social media advocated by the youth had largely drawn support from both locally and from netizens across Indonesia. The protest itself was mainly led by youths, organizing and leading the protests. Indonesian political observers and academics noted early that similar sentiments against unpopular fiscal policies and politician behavior could spread beyond the region.

==== August 2025 protests ====
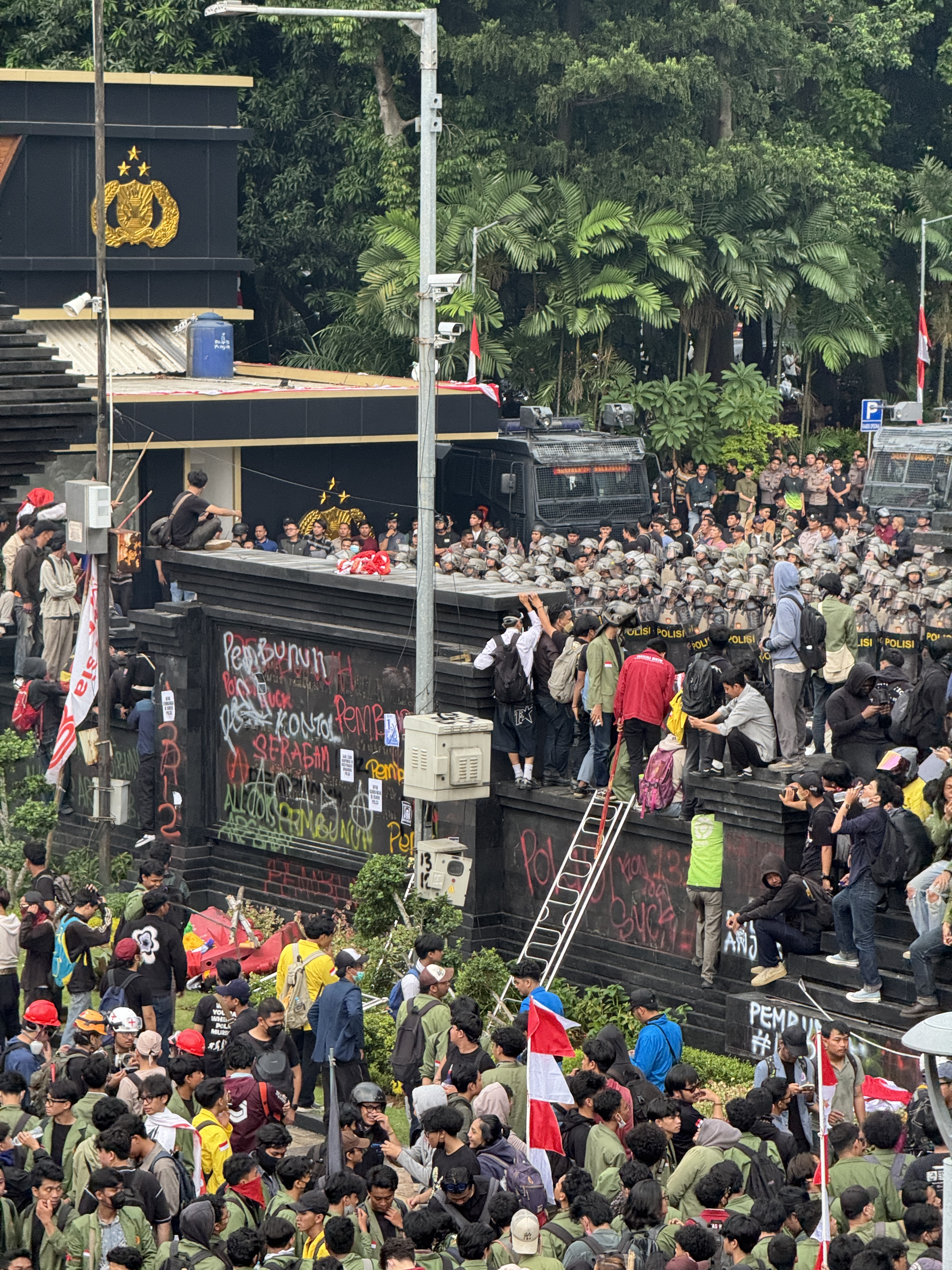
Students surround the Indonesian National Police headquarters in Jakarta amidst police brutality and frustrations, 29 August 2025

Two weeks after the Pati demonstration, on 25 August 2025, protests began in Indonesia as part of a larger civil unrest that began in early 2025 over economic frustrations and a proposed hike in housing subsidies for members of parliament. Protesters initially demanded the House of Representatives to revoke its subsidy schemes and penalize lawmakers who made insensitive statements, as well as to pass the Confiscation of Assets Act for lawmakers convicted of corruption. The protests erupted over a proposed Rp 50 million (US$3,057) monthly housing allowance for parliament members, ten times Jakarta's minimum wage—one of the highest in Indonesia. Combined with existing food and transportation stipends, the allowance sparked public outrage amid rising food and education costs, mass layoffs, and property tax hikes due to central funding cuts. Student-led protesters expanded their demands to include total reform of the Indonesian National Police and resignation of the chief of police, Listyo Sigit Prabowo. The protests, which were largely concentrated around the capital Jakarta, grew in intensity and spread nationwide following the killing of Affan Kurniawan, a motorcycle taxi driver who was run over by a Brimob tactical vehicle on 28 August during a larger violent crackdown on civil dissent. In several cities such as Makassar and Surabaya, multiple government buildings were torched. Houses associated with or belonging to members of parliament were also looted and robbed.

A BBC Indonesia report estimated that House of Representatives members earn over Rp 100 million (US$6,062) monthly, including a Rp 50 million housing allowance, salaries, and other stipends. The Indonesian Forum for Budget Transparency (FITRA) claims the BBC overlooked DPR members' take-home pay, reaching Rp 230 million (US$13,942.60) monthly or Rp 2.8 billion (US$169,736) annually, per the 2023–2025 DPR Budget Implementation List (DIPA). The budget for 580 DPR members' salaries and allowances is set to hit Rp 1.6 trillion in 2025, up from Rp 1.2 trillion in 2023 and Rp 1.8 trillion in 2024. Mahfud MD, former Chief Justice of the Constitutional Court of Indonesia and Minister of Law and Human Rights, contradicted the claim that DPR members' salaries would not reach Rp 250 million per month, asserting instead that their total earnings could amount to billions of rupiah each month.

Adding to the growing outrage in the general public were remarks made by certain members of parliament, which were seen as insensitive and tone deaf to the struggles of ordinary Indonesians. NasDem Party parliament member Nafa Urbach supported the allowance hike, stating that members of the House of Representatives experienced commuting difficulties. She later apologized on social media following public backlash over her statement and pledged her allowance to be given to her constituency. Ahmad Sahroni, deputy chairman of the House of Representative's third commission, described those calling for the dissolution of the parliament as "the dumbest people in the world" and later defended his comments. National Mandate Party parliament member Eko Patrio posted a parody video, which was viewed as mocking public concerns. By the end of the august wave on September 9, the protests had led to the suspension of 5 MPs, the rescindment of lawmakers' perks, and a mass government reshuffle. The protests had left 8 deaths, 8 missing, and thousands arrested.

=== Iran ===
==== Precursor protests ====
The 2022–2023 Mahsa Amini protests were caused by the death of Mahsa Amini in police custody and came to encompass broader issues with the judicial system of the Islamic Republic of Iran. They ultimately failed as hundreds of people were killed and tens of thousands were beaten and/or detained in the government crackdown.

==== 2025–2026 protests ====
The 2025–2026 Iranian protests stemmed from the economic impact of the Iran-Israel war (June 2025), including record low Iranian rial exchange rates, hyperinflation, water crisis, international sanctions and general discontent with the ruling Islamic Republic such as perceived corruption, state terrorism and lack of women's rights.

These resulted in official resignations of Mohammad Reza Farzin as head of the Central Bank (who was replaced by Abdolnaser Hemmati) and Mehdi Sanaei as political adviser to the president; and with president Masoud Pezeshkian and government spokeswoman Fatemeh Mohajerani promising negotiations.

The protests ultimately failed after U.S. President Donald Trump threatened intervention. Supreme Leader of Iran Ali Khamenei stated that the rioters must be "put in their place." An Internet blackout was subsequently enforced and the protests were mostly suppressed by January 2026 through force. Some protests reignited after 21 February 2026. But after the outbreak of the 2026 Iran war on 28 February 2026, and the assassination of Ali Khamenei, the protests ended in March 2026 under severe repression and wartime conditions.

=== Malaysia ===
The July 2025 Oust Anwar protests were caused by public dissatisfaction with the government under the leadership of prime minister Anwar Ibrahim, the increasing prices of goods, high cost of living, implementation of the Urban Renewal Act (URA), increasing prices of Liquefied Petroleum Gas (LPG), abolition of subsidies, failure to carry out reforms, implementation of Sales and Services and Tax (SST), and political intimidation. They were successful in getting a reduction of petrol prices, distribution of 15 billion ringgit (US$3.55 billion) of cash handout, freezing of the plan to raise toll price, but while the cabinet was reshuffled Anwar Ibrahim was reinstated as prime minister.

=== Maldives ===
The 2025 Maldivian protests (20 September 2025 – 18 November 2025) stemmed from a proposed new media control law and perceived corruption. The protests ultimately failed and the media bill was ratified into law, though amnesty was offered to the protesters.

New laws had been passed issuing restrictions on the powers and authority of the local governments of the Maldives, the island councils, as well as the "Maldives Media and Broadcasting Regulation Bill" which enabled fines, suspension, or cancellation of media licenses at the discretion of the state. Additionally, the media bill would have created a single, overarching state-run media regulator, that also had jurisdiction over what journalists posted online. This regulator would have the authority to do everything except shut a media firm down, such as levying fines and suspending outlets that posted stories contrary to "religious norms, national security or public order." Minister of Foreign Affairs Abdulla Khaleel stated that the goal of the bill was to establish "clear standards and a code of conduct" and to "address the challenges of misinformation, disinformation and coordinated manipulation of content."

Protests against the media bill began the day it passed, 21 September 2025, with both the main union of journalists, and opposition party, the Maldivian Democratic Party (MDP) coordinating protests. Former President Ibrahim Mohamed Solih called the media bill the "end of press freedom" and urged his supporters to take to the streets to protest. They would be joined by the Bar Council of the Maldives, which administers the country's bar exams and the governing body for lawyers. By early October the MDP revived and broadened protests, this time centered around alleged widespread graft, rising prices, as well as the media law, with the chant "Lootuvaifi" ("Stop the Loot!") becoming their rallying cry. These protests saw clashes with the police in the capital with police using pepper spray and Long-Range Acoustic Devices to disperse the protesters.

On 3 October 2025 the Maldivian police arrested eight protesters for protesting in unauthorized spaces and deviating from the agreed route of the protests, as well as for throwing bricks and stones at the police. The police response was disproportionate. The MDP also called for the government of President Mohamed Muizzu to resign. MDP National Assembly vice-president Mohamed Raslan suffered a heart attack at the protest.

On October 4 the government issued a statement reaffirming their "commitment to upholding democratic rights, including the right to freedom of peaceful assembly" but that the protesters the night before had "defied the[ir] designated route and forced their way into Majeedhee Magu, - the busiest street in the Capital Male" forcing the police reaction. The Maldives Independent interviewed protesters on October 5, many of whom cited the general economic downturn, cost of living, as well as perceived corruption as to why they were protesting. The media bill would be passed in late October and signed into law.

The events of October 3 would be the only concerted mass protests in opposition to the bill. The MDP held another rally on November 1 but this time centering around rent prices. Shortly after the MDP announced they were planning another, "larger" “Lootuvaifi, Lootuvaifi” rally scheduled for November 17, however, ultimately cancelled due to failing to secure a venue. The following day the Prosecutor General’s Office announced a decision to not prosecute any of those arrested during the protests, essentially offering a general amnesty which the MDP voiced support for.

=== Mongolia ===
The 2025 Mongolian protests, from 14 May – 3 June 2025, had roots in perceived corruption and the unpopularity of prime minister Luvsannamsrain Oyun-Erdene. They were ultimately successful and Oyun-Erdene resigned as prime minister and a new coalition government was established by the ruling Mongolian People's Party.

=== Nepal ===
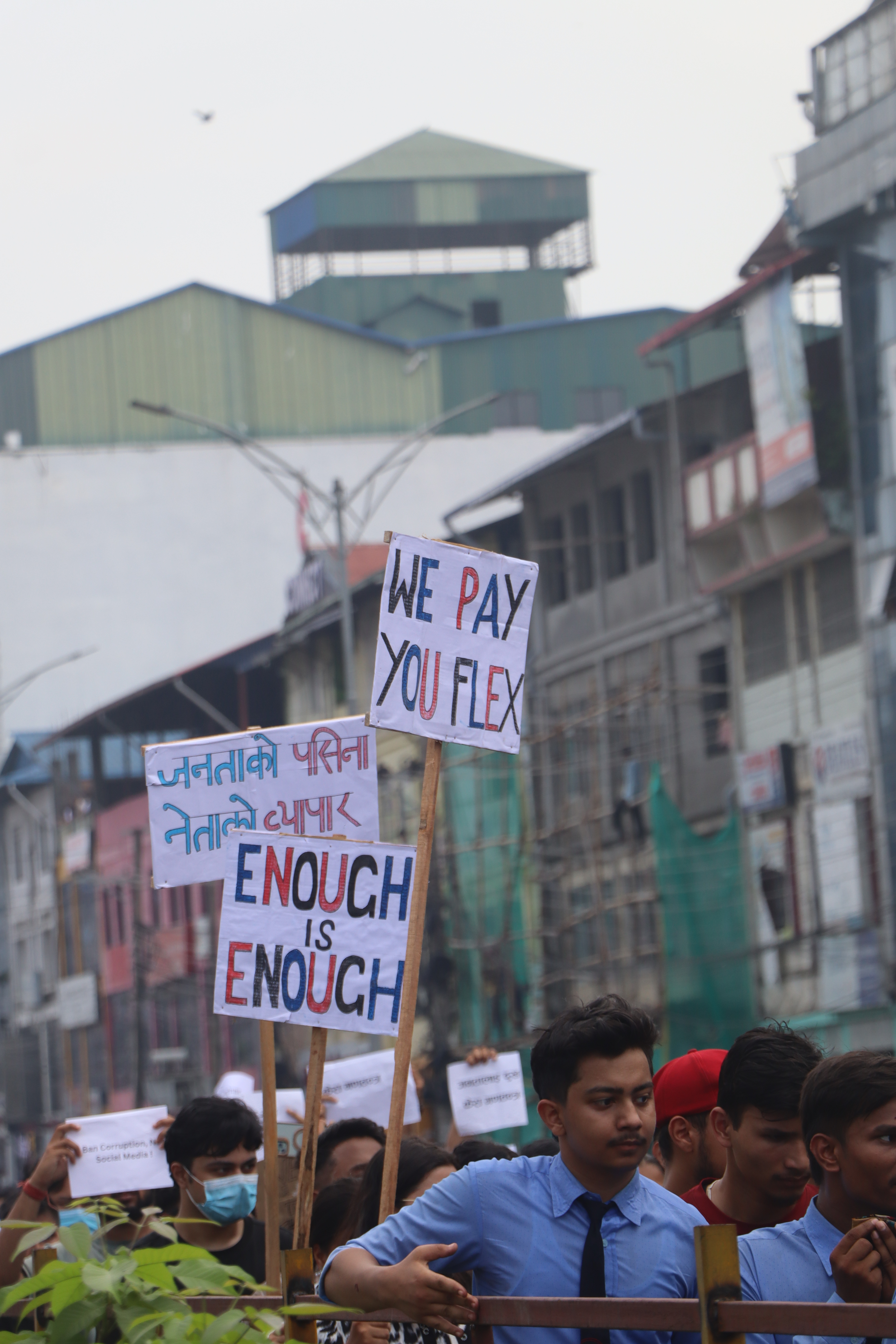
Picket signs during protests in Nepal, 8 September 2025

On 4 September 2025, the government of Nepal ordered the shutdown of 26 social media platforms, including Facebook, X, YouTube, LinkedIn, Reddit, Signal, and Snapchat, for failing to register under the Ministry of Communication and Information Technology's new rules. The registration requirement had been motivated in part as a way to enable the enforcement of a new Digital Services Tax and stricter value-added tax rules on foreign e-service providers in an effort to boost revenue. However, critics alleged the shutdown was prompted by a social media trend highlighting nepotism, focusing on the undue privileges enjoyed by the children and relatives of influential political leaders.

The significance of the media platform ban tied into Nepalese political economy. 33% of Nepalese GDP comes from remittances with hundreds of thousands of exit permits being issued, alongside 20% youth unemployment mean that these remittances keep households afloat and pay import bills, but also indicate a lack of structural transformation in the domestic economy toward an employment-first model, pushing the youth into work in online spaces. Banning social media thus threatened youth livelihood.

Prior to the protests, the average Nepali made US$1,400 per year, while families of the country's ruling elite displayed their wealth on social media. This "Nepo Kid" trend prompted significant public anger. The median age of Nepal's population is 25. Due to this, as well as the country's largely rural, rough terrain and substantial migration abroad, Nepal has some of the highest social media usage in South Asia, with nearly one account for every two people.

On 8 September 2025, large-scale anti-corruption protests and demonstrations took place across Nepal, predominantly organized by Generation Z students and the youth. Also known as "the Gen Z protests", they began following the nationwide ban on numerous social media platforms, and they incorporated the public's frustration with corruption and display of wealth by government officials and their families, as well as allegations of mismanagement of public funds. The movement expanded to encompass broader issues of governance, transparency, and political accountability. The protests escalated with violence against public officials and vandalism of government and political buildings taking place throughout the country.

On 9 September 2025, former King Gyanendra called for calm and resolution be found internally. On that same day, prime minister K. P. Sharma Oli, along with a few government ministers, resigned, and on 12 September, Sushila Karki was appointed as interim prime minister. The social media ban was lifted and the House of Representatives dissolved. The protests had died down by 13 September.

=== Philippines ===
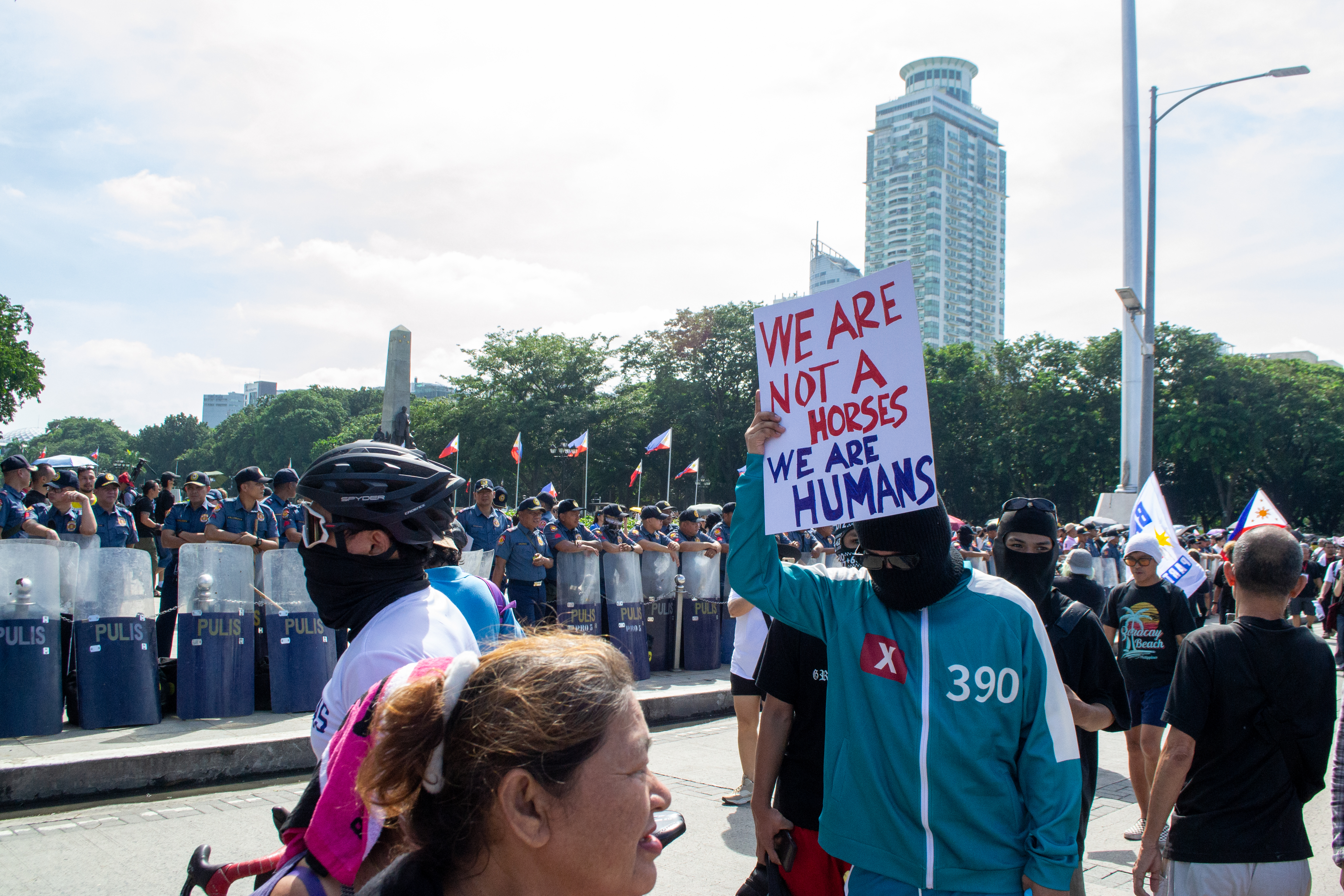
Filipino protester in Squid Game cosplay holding a picket sign showing divide between protestors and the political elite.

Since 2024, a series of allegations of corruption, mismanagement, and irregularities in government-funded flood management projects had been occurring in the Philippines under the administration of president Bongbong Marcos. The controversy centers on billions of pesos allocated for flood management initiatives, reports of "ghost" projects, (Note: The Bureau of Internal Revenue (BIR) defines "ghost" projects as government infrastructure projects that are reported in government documents as "completed" and "fully paid," but never actually constructed.) substandard construction, and the alleged cornering of contracts by a small group of favored contractors. Some ₱1.9 trillion (US$33 billion) had been spent over the past 15 years, more than half of which was allegedly lost to corruption. Reports of anomalies in flood control projects, including incomplete or substandard work and alleged ghost projects, prompted widespread criticism of the government. Public discontent grew amid calls for transparency and accountability in infrastructure spending.

Previously, the Filipino government had been monitoring the widespread unrest in neighboring Indonesia with caution and concern. Officials explicitly voiced their wish to avoid a similar escalation at home, urging restraint and dialogue rather than mass street mobilization. However, coinciding with the height of the regional youth protest wave that swept across South and Southeast Asia in September 2025, the movement emboldened political sentiment among disillusioned Filipino youth. As Indonesian protests around late August and early September gained momentum over corruption and parliamentary perks and frustrations over corruption, mismanagement, and irregularities were fanned by Catholic church leaders, business executives and retired generals, President Bongbong Marcos recalibrated and publicly backed anti-corruption outrage under the urgency of peaceful protest. The Filipino government later touted institutional remedies (an independent probe into flood-control graft, audits, and cancellations of suspect projects) as the path forward.

The date of the rally, on September 21, coincides with the anniversary of the official date (Note: The actual announcement was on September 23, 1972, but Proclamation No. 1081 was officially dated by Ferdinand Marcos to have been signed on September 21, 1972.) of the declaration of martial law by President Ferdinand Marcos, father of Bongbong Marcos, in 1972, a symbolic choice for groups emphasizing democratic rights and government accountability.

==== 2025 protests ====
The 2025–2026 Philippine anti-corruption protests protests refer to the widespread protests in the Philippines, mainly held at Rizal Park in Manila and at the People Power Monument along EDSA in Quezon City, both within Metro Manila. It involves several anti-corruption protests stemming from the investigation of government corruption in flood control programs, involving both executive and legislative branches of the Philippine government. Several cities and municipalities in different provinces have also held their own protests within their locality.

The protests in Rizal Park were organized by various sectoral groups, including activists and students, while the protest at the People Power Monument became known as the "Trillion Peso March". Organized by church groups, mainly the Catholic Church and Protestant churches, civil society organizations, labor unions, and political coalitions.

=== Timor-Leste ===
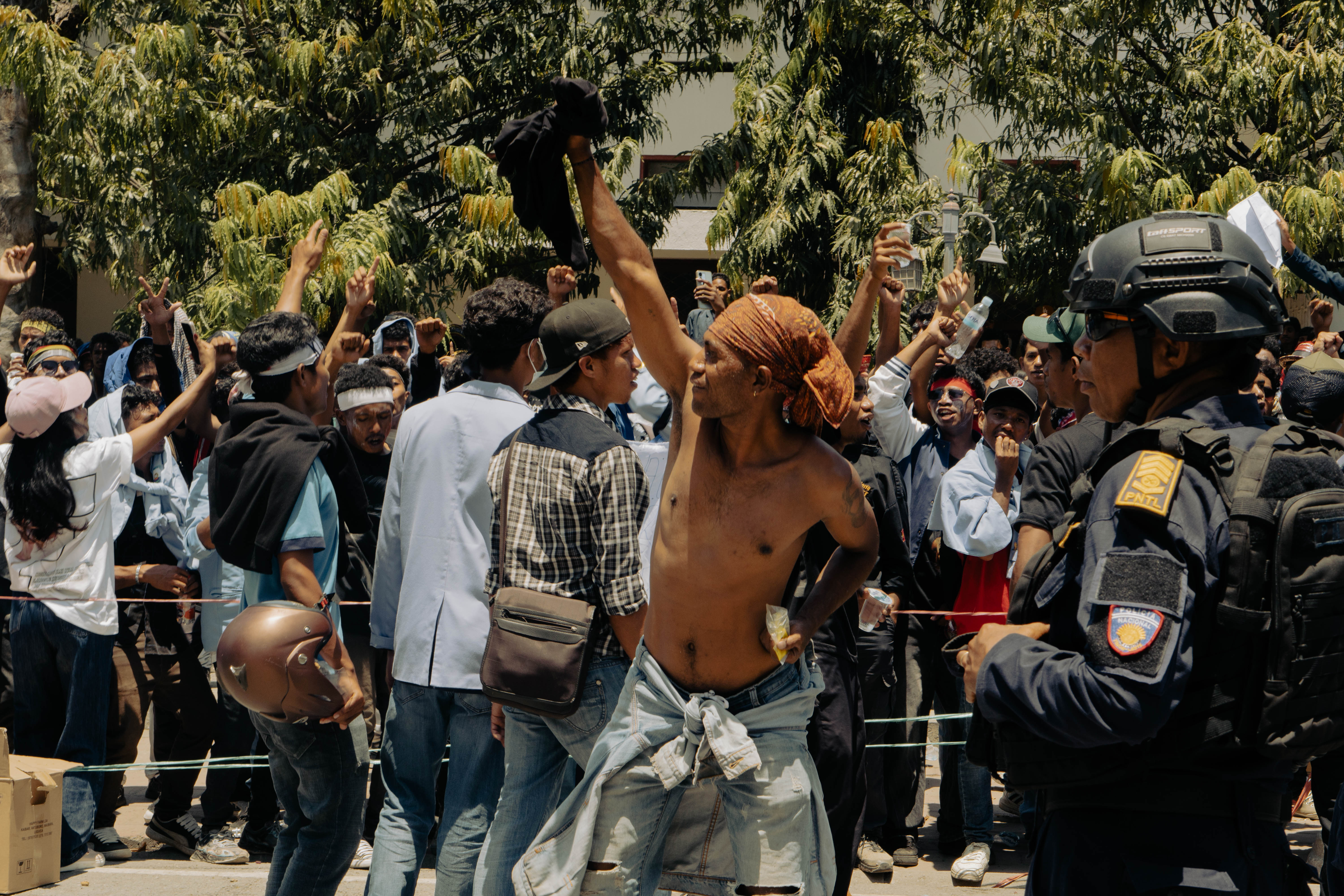
Timorense youth rally to protest in Dili, 17 September 2025

The September 2025 Timor-Leste protests were caused by a proposed US$4 million budget to buy 65 new cars for members of parliament. The purchase of cars was later canceled and pensions for former MPs ended.

On 15 September 2025, following the success of the Indonesian and the Nepalese Gen Z protests, student-led protests were held in Dili, the capital of Timor-Leste, against the National Parliament's decision to purchase SUVs for legislators at a cost of US$4 million. The demonstrators' demands soon expanded to calling for the cancellation of lifetime pensions for former MPs. After three days of demonstrations, student leaders and parliament reached an agreement, ending the protests.

On 15 September 2025, more than 1,000 people, mostly university students from Dili, gathered in front of parliament to demonstrate. Police responded with tear gas and rubber bullets, injuring four people, after some protestors threw stones towards the parliament building. Later that day, three parties within the ruling coalition of the National Congress for Timorese Reconstruction (CNRT), the Democratic Party (PD), and Kmanek Haburas Unidade Nasional Timor Oan (KHUNTO), announced that they would ask parliament to cancel the purchase of cars for MPs.

More than 2,000 demonstrators returned to the streets the following day, with their demands expanding to call for the cancellation of the lifetime pensions provided to former lawmakers. Later that day, parliament voted unanimously to cancel the plan to purchase new cars. On September 17, a third day of demonstrations concluded with an agreement between protest leaders and parliament that the pensions for former MPs would be canceled and, in return, the demonstrations would conclude.

=== Pakistan ===
A series of ongoing demonstrations, strikes and clashes in Pakistan-administered Azad Kashmir began on 7 June 2026. The protests are primarily organized by the Jammu Kashmir Joint Awami Action Committee (JKJAAC), which presented a 38-point charter of demands to the Government of Azad Kashmir, including its opposition of reservation of 12 seats in the Azad Kashmir Legislative Assembly for refugees from Jammu and Kashmir residing elsewhere in Pakistan. The group argues that the arrangement allows non-residents to influence the political affairs of Azad Kashmir. Multiple JKJAAC members and policemen have been killed and injured in the unrest.

The protests intensified following a ruling by the Supreme Court of Azad Kashmir on 7 June 2026, which held that the refugee seats are constitutionally protected and cannot be abolished without a constitutional amendment. Demonstrations subsequently spread across Rawalakot, Muzaffarabad, Mirpur, Kotli, Bagh and other areas.

The second phase of protests started on 27 July 2026, during the first phase of the Azad Kashmir general election. The JKJAAC boycotted the election and led a long march from Rawalakot to Muzaffarabad. Violence during the protests resulted in death of over 50 protestors, including JKJAAC's leader Sardar Umar Nazir's brother Sardar Usman Nazir.

== Characteristics ==
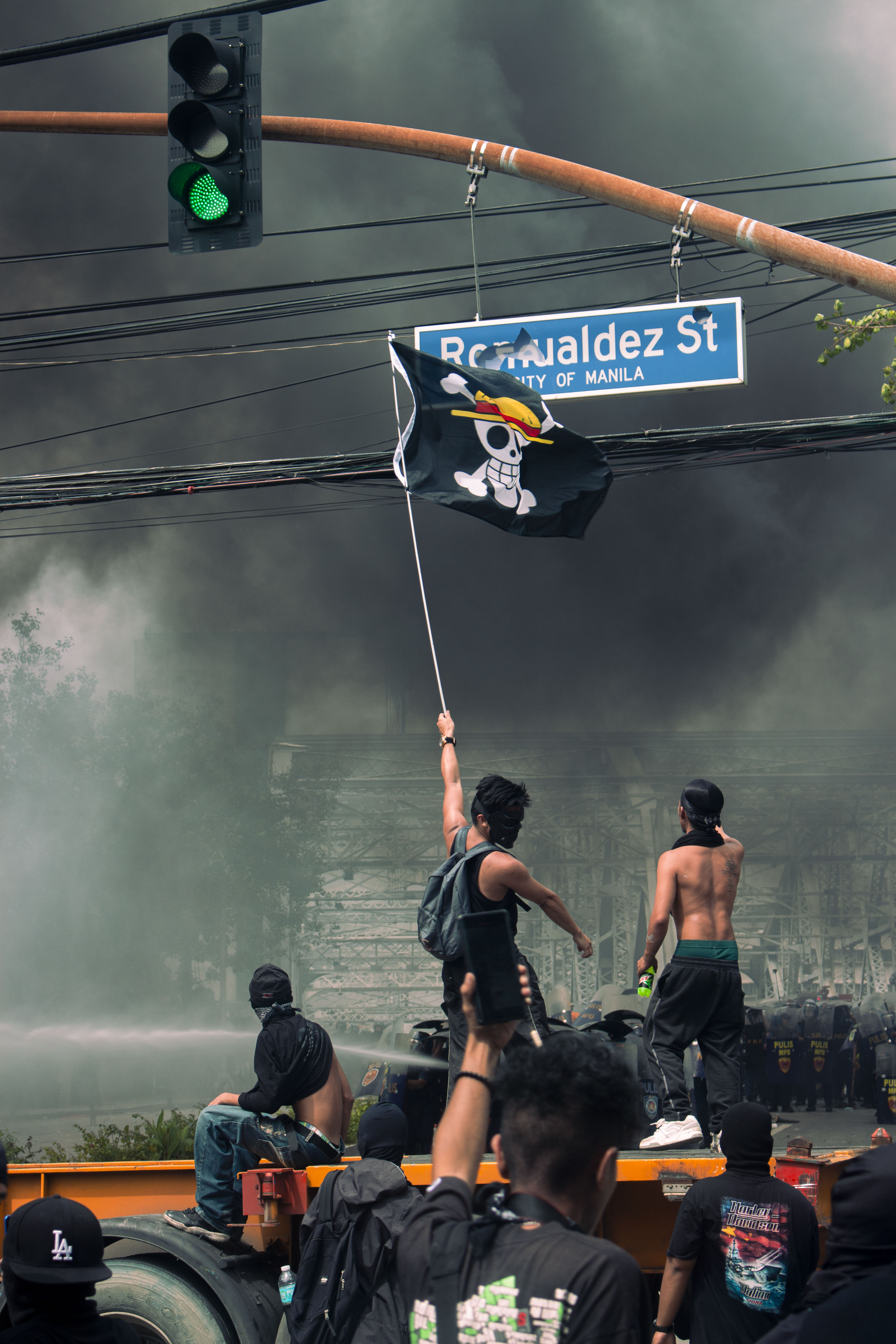
A protester waves the Straw Hat Pirates' Jolly Roger in the Filipino protests, 21 September 2025

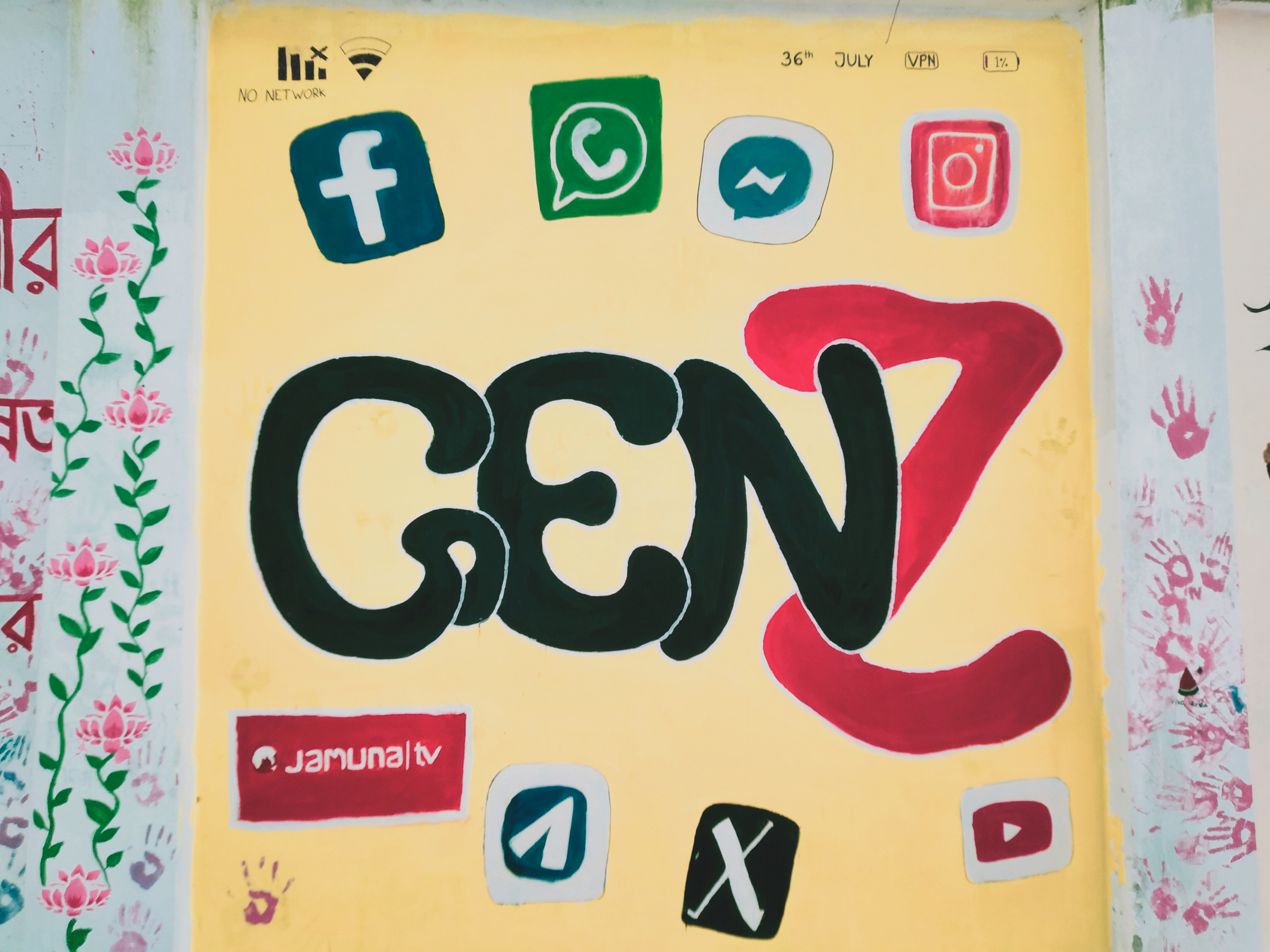
A graffiti in Bangladesh drawn by Gen Z in the aftermath of the protests, showing various social media websites which played a key role organising the movement.

The protests have been notable for the leading role taken by Generation Z, especially students, with social media and internet activism being playing a key role in organizing the protests. Several affected governments enacted social media bans and internet shutdowns as a result. Symbols in popular culture, such as the flag of the Straw Hat Pirates from the Japanese manga series One Piece, have been adopted by protestors across Asia to support their cause.

== Analysis ==
Bangladeshi researchers S Toufiq Haque, Syeda Lasna Kabir and Mohammad Isa Ibn Belal claimed that Sri Lankan, Bangladeshi and Nepalese uprisings have reintroduced the region of South Asia as a "centre of uprisings", and argued that post-uprising governments of these countries failed to address the key issues behind the uprisings–corruption, nepotism, political instability, unemployment and social inequality. National Security Adviser of India Ajit Doval claimed that poor governance was responsible for the regime changes in South Asia.

Aditya Gowdara Shivamurthy, fellow at the Observer Research Foundation, opined that the weakening of governments in Sri Lanka, Bangladesh and Nepal created political vacuums that resulted the opportunists and fringe groups to enter the protests and seek political legitimacy, like Janatha Vimukthi Peramuna in Sri Lanka, Jamaat-e-Islami in Bangladesh, and monarchists in Nepal.

== See also ==
- 2026 Delhi Jantar Mantar protests
- Political views of Generation Z
- Lightstick protests
- 2019–2020 Hong Kong protests
- End SARS (Nigeria, 2020)
- Myanmar protests (2021–present)
- 2021 Russian protests
- Kenya Finance Bill protests (2024)
- 2022 COVID-19 protests in China
- 2024 Venezuelan presidential election protests
- 2024–2025 Mozambican protests
- 2025 Kenyan protests
- 2025 Malagasy protests
- 2025 Mexican protests
- 2025 Moroccan Gen Z protests
- 2025 Peruvian protests
- 2026 French student protests
- Gaza war protests
