= 2025 Timor-Leste protests =

Student-led demonstrations in Dili, Timor-Leste

- Part of the Gen Z protests in Asia
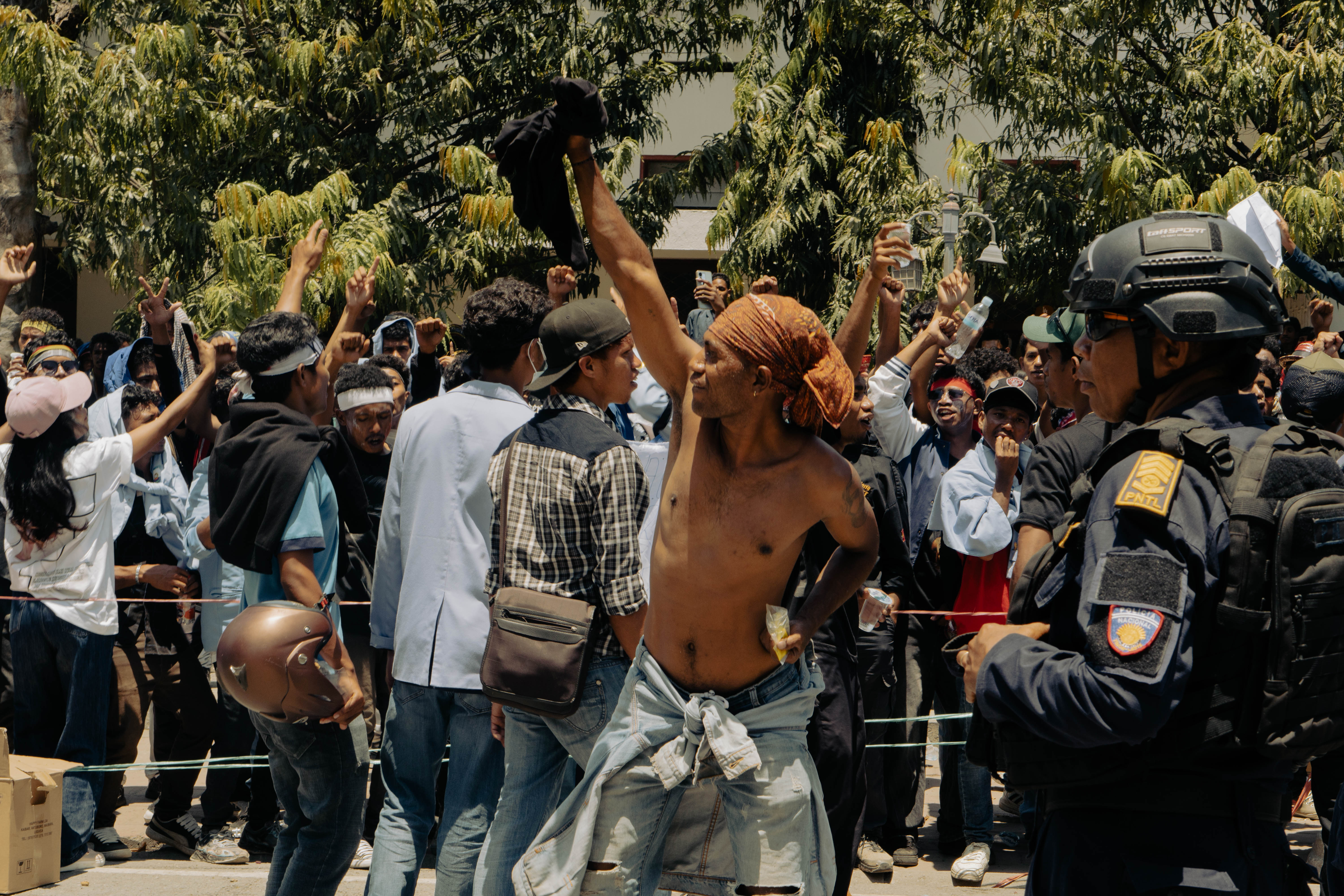
- Protests in Dili
- Date: 15–17 September 2025 (3 days)
- Location: Dili, Timor-Leste
- Caused by: Proposed US$4 million budget to buy 65 new cars for members of parliament
- Goals: Cancellation of MPs' new car purchase
- Methods: Demonstrations; Student activism; Riots; Arson; Vandalism
- Result: Protester victory: Purchase of cars for MPs canceled; Agreement reached between protestors and MPs to abolish pensions for former MPs

Parties
(Timor-Leste) Protesters: Youths; Students	Government of Timor Leste; National Parliament; Ministry of the Interior; National Police of Timor-Leste; Ministry of Defense; Timor-Leste Defence Force

Lead figures
Saad Kassis-Mohamed; Decentralised leadership	(Timor-Leste) José Ramos-Horta (Timor-Leste) Xanana Gusmão (Timor-Leste) Maria Fernanda Lay (Timor-Leste) Francisco da Costa Guterres (Timor-Leste) Pedro Klamar Fuik; Henrique da Costa; Falur Rate Laek

Casualties
- Injuries: 5+ students 2 police officers

In September 2025, student-led protests were held in Dili, the capital of Timor-Leste, against the National Parliament's decision to purchase SUVs for legislators at a cost of US$4 million. The demonstrators' demands soon expanded to calling for the cancellation of lifetime pensions for former MPs. After three days of demonstrations, student leaders and parliament reached an agreement, ending the protests.

On 15 September 2025, more than 1,000 people, mostly university students from Dili, gathered in front of parliament to demonstrate. Police responded with tear gas and rubber bullets, injuring four people, after some protestors threw stones towards the parliament building. Later that day, three parties within the ruling coalition—the National Congress for Timorese Reconstruction (CNRT), the Democratic Party (PD), and Kmanek Haburas Unidade Nasional Timor Oan (KHUNTO)—announced that they would ask parliament to cancel the purchase of cars for MPs.

More than 2,000 demonstrators returned to the streets the following day, with their demands expanding to call for the cancellation of the lifetime pensions provided to former lawmakers. Later that day, parliament voted unanimously to cancel the plan to purchase new cars. On September 17, a third day of demonstrations concluded with an agreement between protest leaders and parliament that the pensions for former MPs would be canceled and, in return, the demonstrations would conclude.

== Background ==
Timor-Leste, an independent state from Indonesia since 2002, is one of the poorest countries in Southeast Asia, with an oil-dependent economy and high levels of inequality, malnutrition, and unemployment. More than 40% of the population lives in poverty. Ninety percent of Timor-Leste's national income comes from its Petroleum Fund, which was valued at US$18.27 billion in 2024 but is depleting rapidly.

According to the 2022 census, 64.6% of the country's 1.3 million inhabitants are under 30 years old. Public schools are poorly funded and overcrowded, and each year, over 15,000 secondary school graduates and 4,000 university graduates enter the labor market, with few job opportunities. Surveys have found that almost half of young Timorese plan to seek work abroad, the most popular destinations being Australia, South Korea, and the United Kingdom.

Members of the National Parliament of Timor-Leste have an annual salary of US$36,000 as of 2023, more than 10 times the country's average income, estimated in 2021 at $3,000. Under a law passed in 2006, former MPs are entitled to a lifetime pension equivalent to their salary. Lawmakers also receive free cars to be used as official work vehicles.

Since the 2000s, there have been recurring demonstrations against MPs' free vehicles, and in 2008 police arrested several students who were protesting a planned $1 million purchase of new cars for lawmakers that year. In November 2018, the Movimento Universitario de Timor Leste (MUTL) organized demonstrations against the purchase of new Toyota Prado SUVs for members of parliament. The National Police of Timor-Leste (PNTL) used tear gas against the demonstrators, and 22 protestors were arrested. New vehicles were last purchased for members of parliament in 2020.

In late August 2025, the National Parliament approved a $4.225 million purchase of 65 Toyota Prados, at a cost of $61,500 per vehicle, for each member of parliament. President of Parliament Maria Fernanda Lay stated that the decision to purchase the cars had been made because "all the [MPs'] vehicles have already broken down." However, a Diligente report indicate that the old vehicles were still largely roadworthy when Parliament announced the purchase of new Toyota Prados for all members of parliament for $4.225 million in June/July 2025. A contract was expected to be signed in September, with the vehicles to be delivered before the end of the year.

The plan was criticized by opposition parties and civil society groups as extravagant during a time of economic uncertainty in Timor-Leste. The leader of the opposition People's Liberation Party (PLP), Maria Angelina Lopes Sarmento, disputed Lay's claim that legislators' existing cars were all broken down, telling reporters that "some are still in working condition, and others need repairs. Student groups also denounced the decision, including the National Resistance of East Timorese Students, which said members of parliament should be "ashamed of this move."

The protests in Timor-Leste arose amid similar demonstrations in other Asian countries, in what has been dubbed the Gen Z protests. In August–September 2025, students in Indonesia demonstrated for the abolition of privileges for parliamentarians. President Prabowo Subianto announced in early September that privileges would be abolished. At the same time, violent protests in Nepal broke out, resulting in a change of government. Both protest movements were primarily driven by Generation Z.

=== Organizing ===
Following the announcement of the planned car purchase, the organisation Estudante Universitário de Timor-Leste (EUTL) announced protests in Dili on 4 September. The demonstration was to take place on the central campus of the Universidade Nacional Timor Lorosa'e (UNTL), across the street from the National Parliament. The police initially banned the demonstration, citing a law (Art. 5 & 13, 1/2006) that prohibits protest rallies within 100 metres of public institutions. The demonstration was to be moved to Tasitolu or Hera on the outskirts of the city. Natalício Nunes, the spokesperson for the EUTL, reacted with outrage and stated that the students would still demonstrate at UNTL. The police should have issued a written statement within two days. Instead, instructions were only received by telephone on 9 September. Furthermore, demonstrations had taken place at UNTL in the past. He accused Dili's police commander, Orlando Gomes, of trying to intimidate the students and threatening them with arrest.

The national police commander, Justino Menezes, explained that this was precisely why Tasitolu had been proposed as the demonstration site. In addition, the students had been offered the opportunity to accompany them to the National Parliament so that they could speak directly with members of parliament. The students had refused this offer. 'The students can hold a press conference on campus, but not a demonstration', Justino Menezes concluded on 11 September. Otherwise, the police would take action against them.

== Protests ==
=== 15 September ===
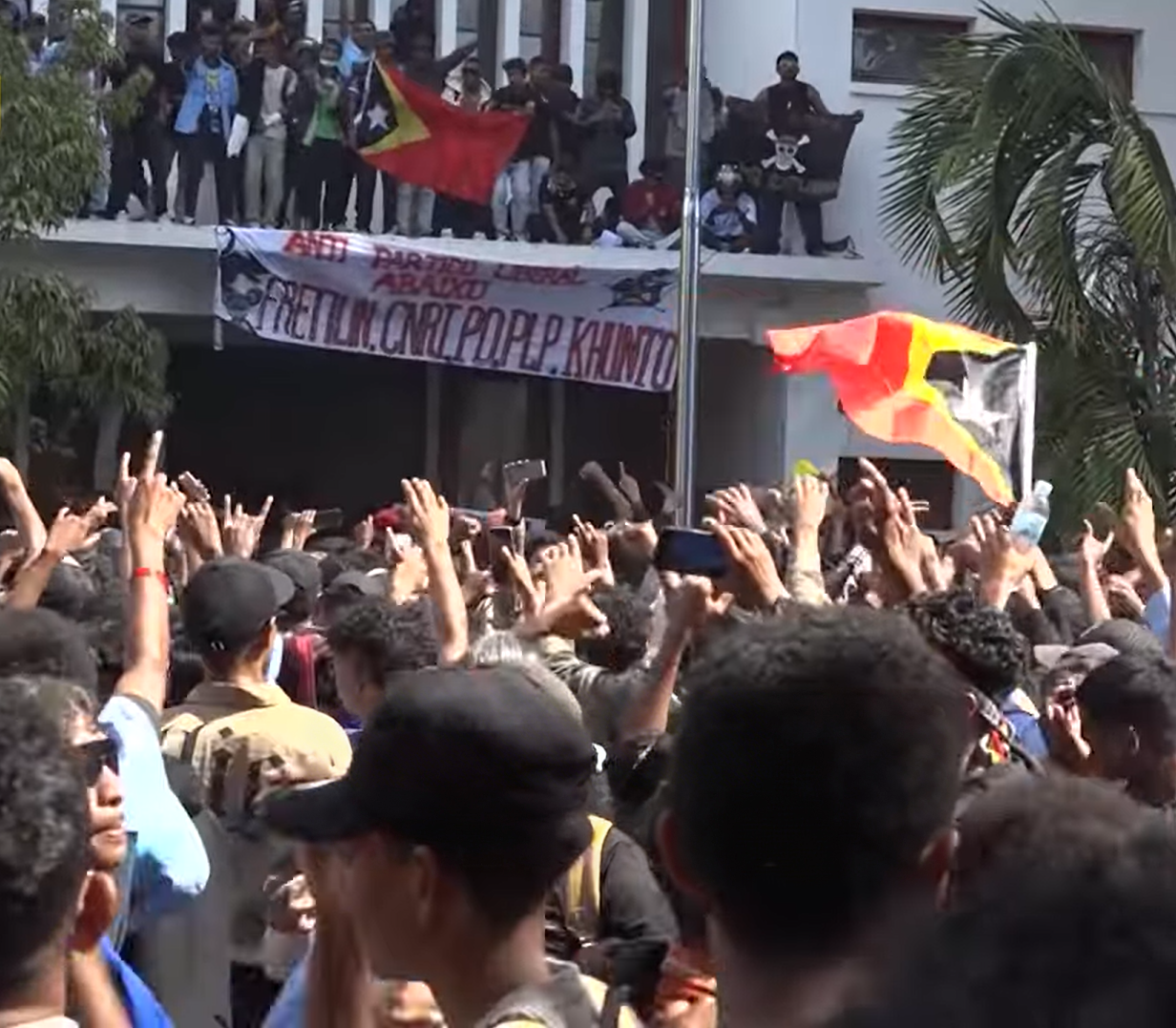
Protesters at the UNTL building. The Straw Hat Pirates' Jolly Roger is seen on the top right.

On Monday, 15 September 2025, more than 1,000 people, mostly university students from Dili, Timor-Leste's capital, gathered in front of the National Parliament of Timor-Leste to rally against the legislature's plan to purchase 65 Toyota Prado SUVs for each member of parliament. In attendance were students from four universities—Universidade Nacional Timor Lorosa'e (UNTL), Universidade Dili (UNDIL), Universidade da Paz (UNPAZ), and Universidade Oriental Timor Lorosa'e (UNITAL)—as well as members of various groups, gathered at the university building starting at 8 a.m. The protest coincided with the opening ceremony of the third legislative session of the Sixth Legislature of the National Parliament.

In addition to the revocation of the vehicles purchase, the students demanded an end to the lifetime pension for former members of parliament and a reduction of the exclusion zone for demonstrations from 100 to 25 meters. In addition to banners and placards, they carried national flags, crosses, and fake coffins on which "Rest in peace for the 65 members of parliament" was written. The protest march went down the street while the participants shouted slogans and sang protest songs. The police were on site to maintain order, but allowed the students to continue.

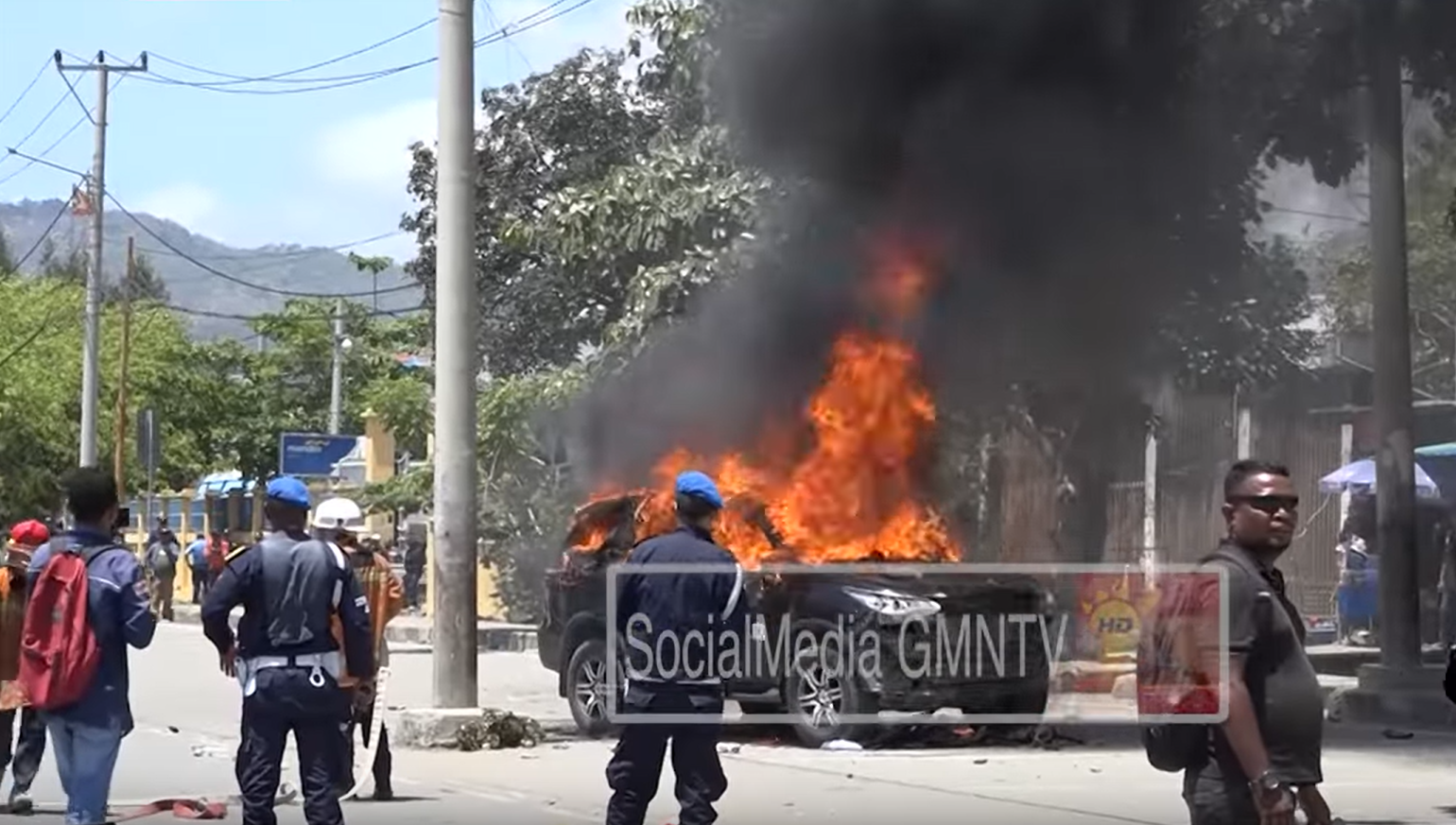
Car set on fire during protests, 15 September

The demonstrators were initially peaceful, but later began throwing water bottles and stones towards the parliament building and police, damaging nearby vehicles. After demonstrators set a state vehicle on fire in front of the Polícia Científica de Investigação Criminal headquarters, police responded with tear gas and rubber bullets. Four protestors were injured and taken to a nearby medical clinic. An official with the National Police of Timor-Leste said that authorities would demand responsibility for the damage from the protest coordinators. The organizers of the demonstration and the police leadership quickly contacted each other to calm the situation, with EUTL spokesperson Caetano da Cruz and police commander Menezes both calling for calm. The demonstration was then able to resume peacefully. The pirate flag from the anime One Piece, which was used by the Indonesian protests, was seen at the protests.

Later that day, the National Congress for Timorese Reconstruction (CNRT), the Democratic Party (PD), and Kmanek Haburas Unidade Nasional Timor Oan (KHUNTO)—all members of the ruling coalition—released a joint statement saying that they would ask parliament to cancel the purchase as it "did not reflect public interest." CNRT vice president Patrocínio Fernandes explained that the parties had originally supported the purchase due to the deteriorating condition of lawmakers' existing vehicles, but changed their stance due to public opposition.

=== 16 September ===
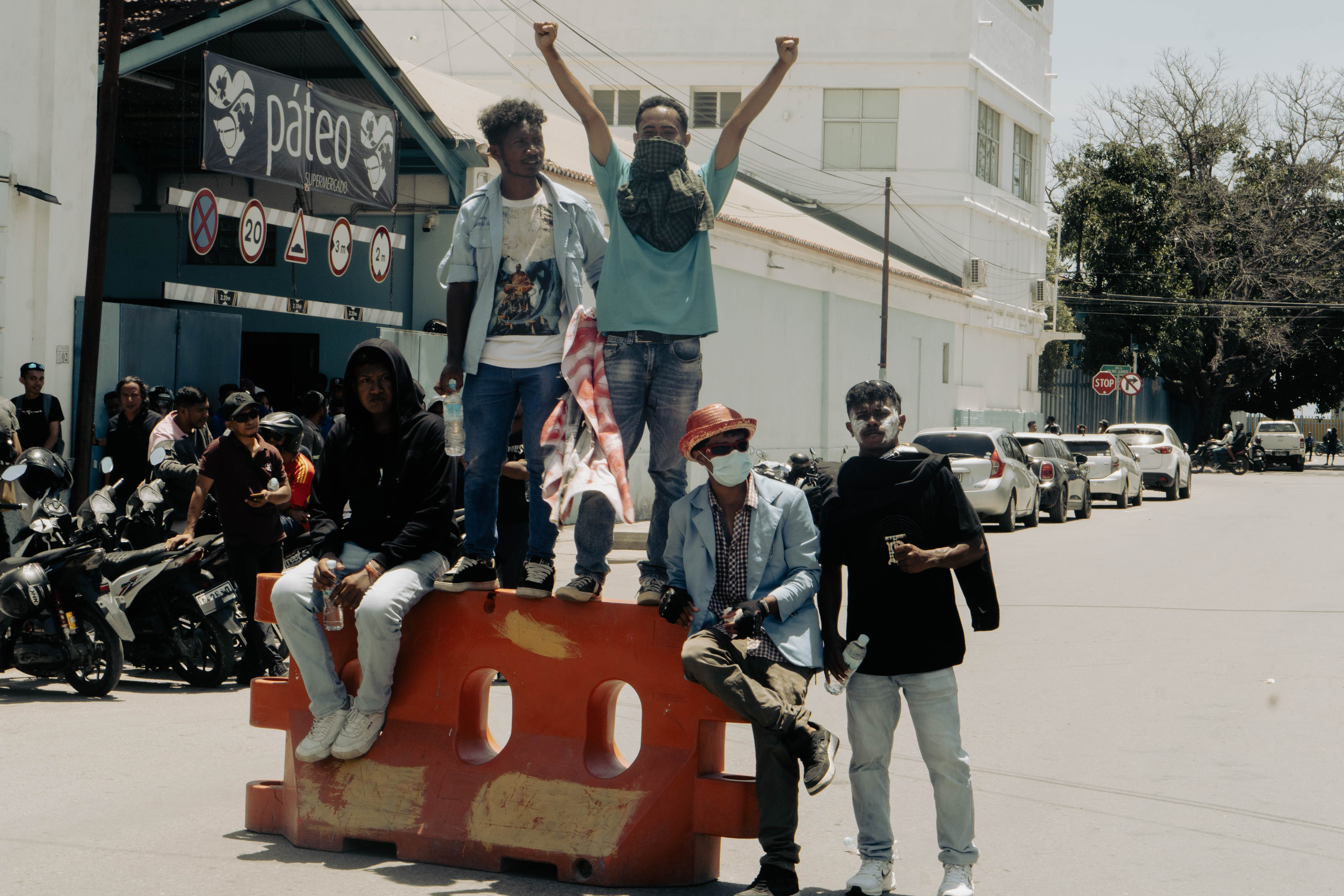
Timorese youth protesting, 16 September

The following day, Tuesday, September 16, more than 2,000 demonstrators again gathered outside the National Parliament, vowing to continue protesting until the plan to purchase cars was formally canceled by lawmakers. The students were moving towards the parliament building when they were stopped by the police near the Timorese Resistance Archive and Museum. Protest leader Natalício Nunes later accused Prime Minister Xanana Gusmão, who was on a state visit to London at the time, of giving the order. Around midday, the situation escalated, with tires set on fire, and some demonstrators breaking through the police barrier, to which officers responded with tear gas. Five students suffered injuries to their heads, arms, and legs in the ensuing mass exodus. Two police officers who were protecting the gate to the parliament were also injured. The police then entered the UNTL campus and drove the youths out of the building. Pedro Belo, PNTL deputy police chief, and Gastão Piedade, a national director of the Serviço Nacional de Inteligência (SNI), contacted the students to signal that they still have the right to demonstrate peacefully.

Some participants in the protests were accused by demonstrators of being troublemakers and police infiltrators. Others were said to have been members of the youth organizations of the ruling parties. The students handed suspected provocateurs over to the police, who in some cases led the individuals away from the protest. Various false reports circulated on social media. For example, photos of a victim of a car accident in Ermera Municipality were circulated as images of a dead demonstrator. Others linked images of the demonstrations in Dili and the protests in Nepal, the war in Gaza, or the Santa Cruz massacre during the Indonesian occupation of East Timor. Videos were shared with the deceased rebel Major Reinado calling on the population to resist the oppression. Memes and excerpts from politicians' speeches on car purchases and parliamentary pensions were also posted. Insults, rumors, and accusations heated up the online atmosphere. Cristóvão de Araújo, a spokesperson for the EUTL, reported threats on social media. Araújo and other EUTL members later filed a complaint with the PCIC against fake profiles that spread threats.

Later that day, the National Parliament voted to cancel the purchase of new vehicles with Resolution No. 19/2025, supported unanimously by all 57 members present. The parliamentary secretary announced a resolution instructing the legislature's general secretariat to "adopt administrative and financial measures aimed at maintenance and efficient use" of parliament's existing fleet of cars and to continue using its current vehicles.

=== 17 September ===
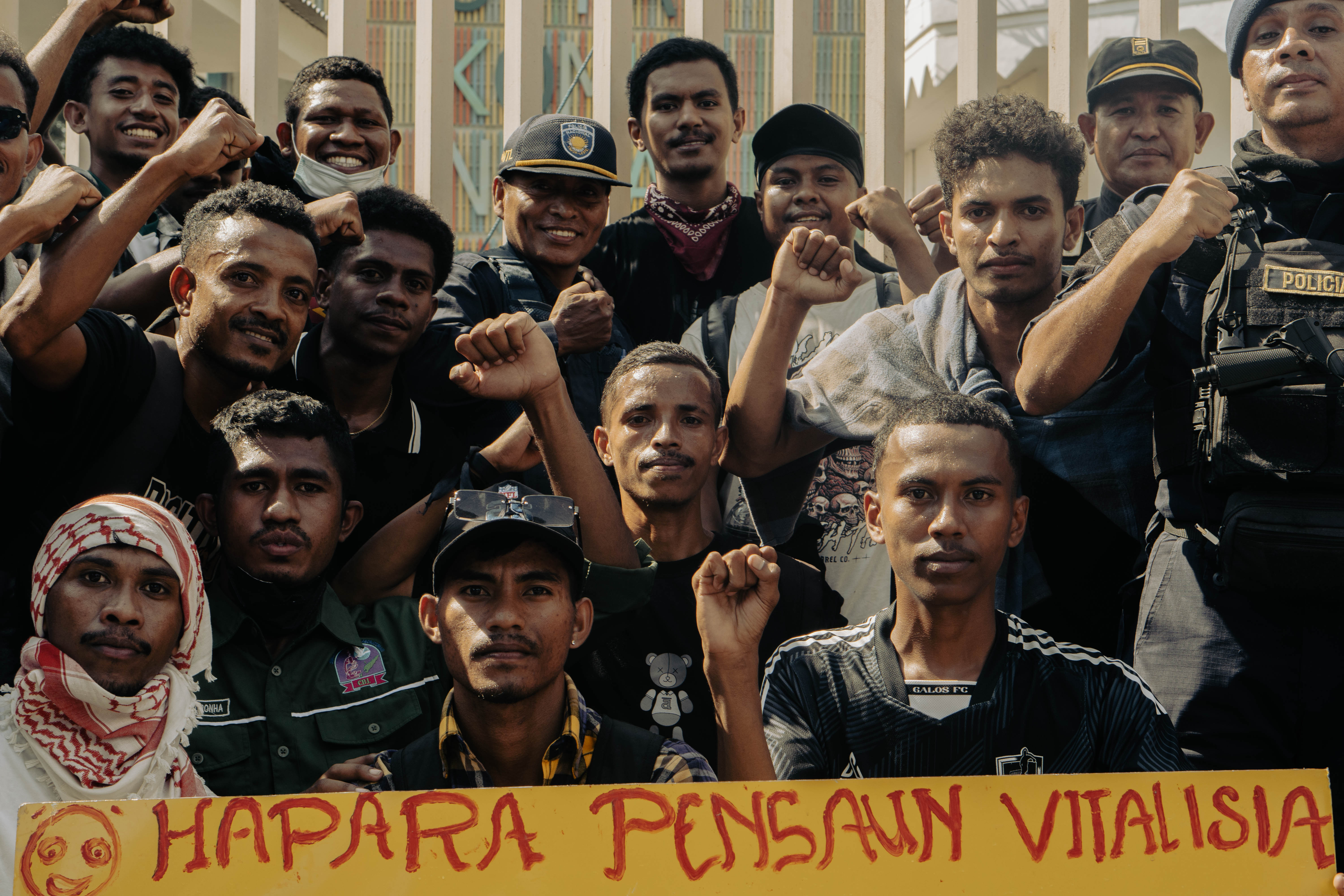
Photo taken of protesters and police officers together, 17 September

On Wednesday, September 17, both the protest organisers and the police changed their strategies. By 9 a.m., hundreds of people had already gathered. In a peaceful atmosphere, the demonstrators divided themselves into groups, each with coordinators responsible for the behaviour of their people during the demonstration. This was also intended to deter potential provocateurs. The protest avoided blocking the road. The police again protected the entrance to the parliament, but appeared more relaxed and held back. People chatted with each other and students distributed water to both the demonstrators and the police. There was music, singing, poetry recitations and speeches, including from people outside the student movement. Elements of civil society mobilized to provide water, food, and public support for the demands. At the same time, the protests reached their largest turnout since the beginning, with an estimated 1,000 to 2,000 demonstrators once again returned to the streets in Dili to protest.

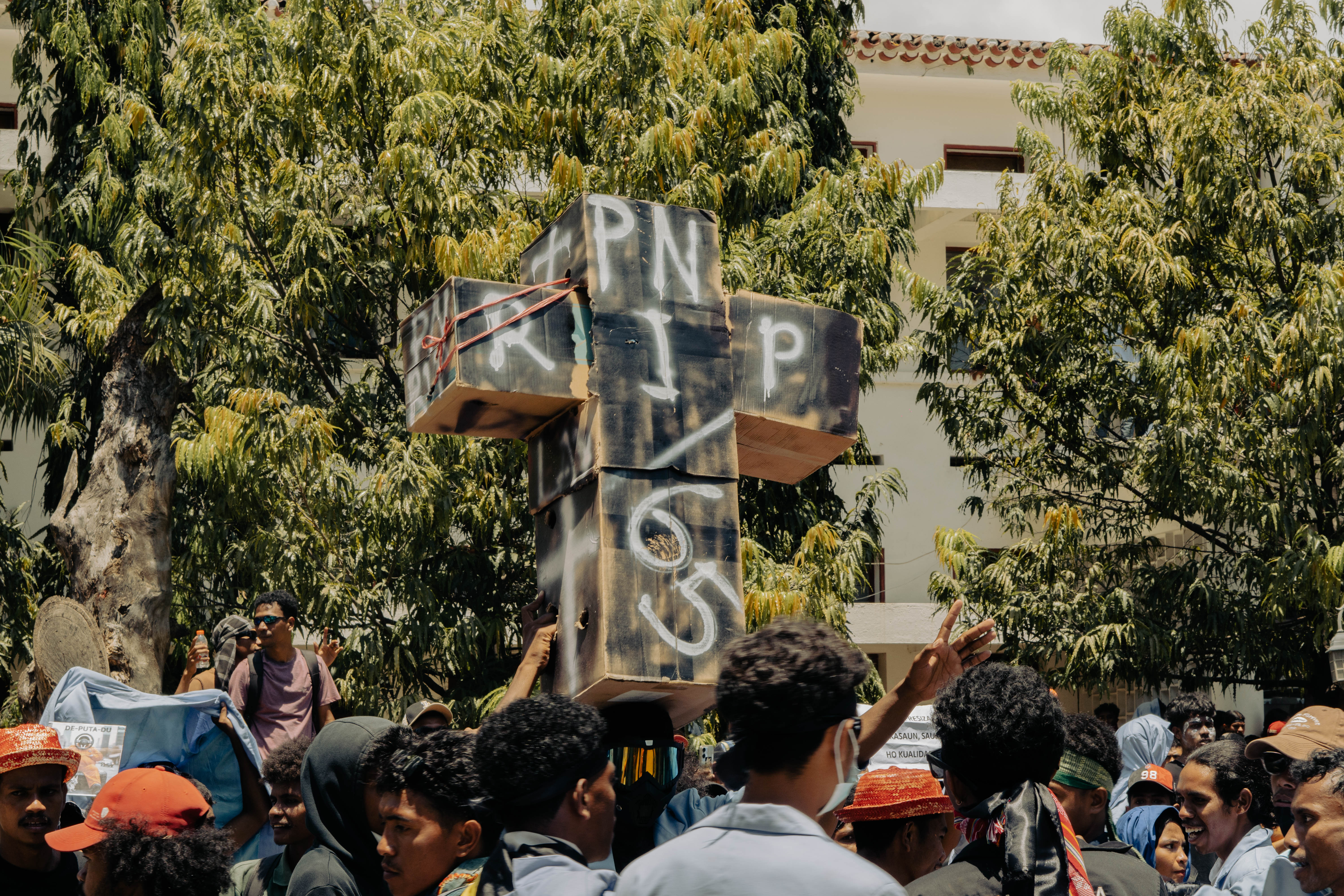
A death cross with an inscription "PN RIP 65". referring to the 65 members of the National Parliament.

By then, the protestors' goals had expanded to include calls for abolishing lifetime pensions provided to former members of parliament. Later that day, members of parliament reached an agreement with the student protest leaders to cancel their lifetime pensions, with the students in return agreeing to cease their demonstrations. In a statement, parliament announced it would take steps to annul the relevant law. Cristóvão Mato, a representative of the student demonstrators, said "If they don't comply with the agreement, we will hold bigger protests." At the same time, seven student representatives (Natalício Nunes, Francelina Freitas de Piedade, Marcelino dos Santos, José da Costa, Fernando de Andrade, Caetano da Cruz and Cristóvão de Araújo) met with members of parliament for a seven-hour conference, which was broadcast live on social media.

In the afternoon, individual demonstrators threw stones again and the police responded with tear gas, but the crowd remained calm. At the end of the demonstration, the demonstrators joined hands under the national flag hoisted at the UNTL and sang the national anthem. Police and demonstrators embraced and danced together. Then the students marched through the city in a victory procession. Medical facilities report a total of 17 injured demonstrators, mainly due to tear gas and physical violence by police officers. One person had to be treated at the Hospital Nacional Guido Valadares for a head injury.

== Reactions ==
=== Domestic ===
Tatoli, the state news agency, described cancellation of the purchase of vehicles as "a rare parliamentary retreat under public pressure, highlighting the growing influence of student activism on national policymaking" in Timor-Leste.

On the second day of demonstrations, President José Ramos-Horta told reporters that there would be "no tolerance" of violence by demonstrators, stating, "You can hold demonstrations to protest the government, parliament when they do wrong, but you must not resort to violence." The same day, leader of the opposition Fretilin party, Aniceto Guterres Lopes, thanked the student protestors and noted that his party had presented a proposal to remove the funding earmarked for the purchase of cars for MPs when it was first proposed during state budget discussions in parliament in November 2024, but was overruled by the governing coalition. He stated: "Fretilin's position has always been clear. We wanted to eliminate this budget because there are other priorities... the people face many shortcomings that need to be addressed." The opposition People's Liberation Party (PLP) leader, Maria Angelina Lopes Sarmento, criticized the CNRT and PD for deciding to cancel the purchase of MPs' vehicles only after the students' demonstration, and recalled that the PLP, like Fretilin, had opposed the move when it was first proposed during initial budget discussions. Prime Minister Xanana Gusmão was away from Timor-Leste on a trip to London during the protests.

== See also ==
- Santa Cruz massacre
- 1999 East Timorese crisis
- 2006 East Timorese crisis
- 2025 in Timor-Leste
- 2025 Indonesian protests
- 2025 Nepalese Gen Z protests
- 2025–2026 Philippine anti-corruption protests
