= Value added tax (Nepal) =

System of indirect taxation implemented in Nepal in 1998

Value Added Tax (VAT) is an indirect tax levied on the value creation or addition. The concept of VAT in Nepal was introduced in FY 2049/50 but the act was developed in BS 2050. VAT was implemented in 1998 and is the major source of government revenue. It is administered by the Inland Revenue Department of Nepal.

== VAT Rates in Nepal ==
The normal VAT rate is 13%; some goods or services are exempted from VAT.
