= Maria Angelina Lopes Sarmento =

East Timorese politician

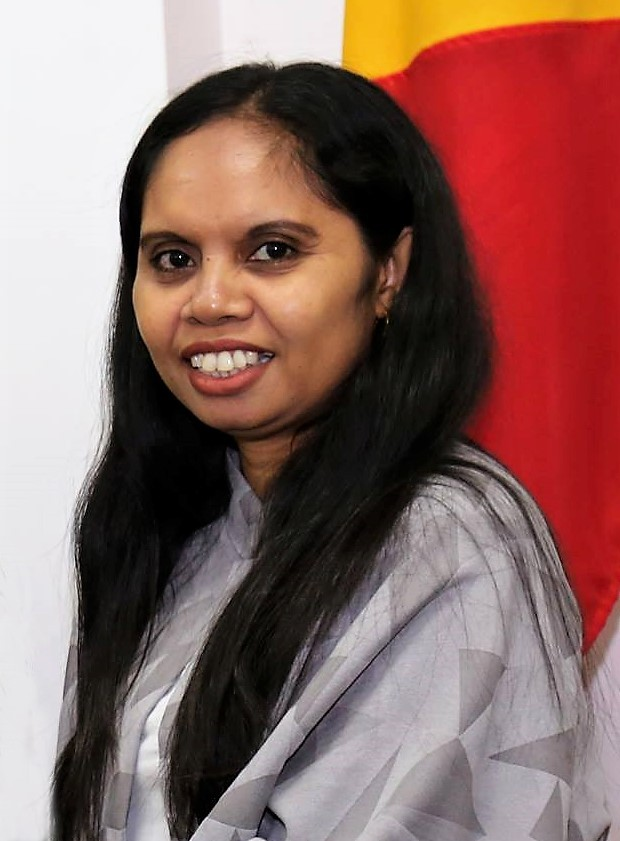

Member of the National Parliament
- Incumbent
- Assumed office 2017
- Constituency: Dili Municipality

Personal details
- Born: 10 July 1978 (age 47) Lahane Oriental, Dili Regency, East Timor, Indonesia
- Party: People's Liberation Party

Maria Angelina Lopes Sarmento, known as Lita Sarmento, (born 10 July 1978 in Lahane Oriental) is an East Timorese People's Liberation Party politician. She was elected to the National Parliament in 2017, and has served as Vice-President of the National Parliament since 2018.
