= Internet Censorship in Sri Lanka =

Internet censorship in Sri Lanka is conducted under a variety of laws, judicial processes, regulations and more. In Sri Lanka, internet censorship is mostly executed by blocking access to specific sites as well as the use of laws which criminalize publication or possession of certain types of material, including regulations against terrorism and pornography.

Most internet censorship in Sri Lanka is based on anti-insurgency.

== Against anti-Muslim riots ==
In 2019, the Sri Lankan government blocked several websites, mainly social media websites such as Facebook and Viber. The goal behind the ban was said to be to subdue the anti-Muslim rioters, however the move was highly criticized by the public.

== Against anti-government protests ==
On 3 April 2022, several social media websites including Facebook, Twitter, Instagram, WhatsApp and YouTube were blocked by the Sri Lankan government for 15 hours, to suppress the anti-government protests amidst the worsening economic crisis.

== Against LTTE sympathizers ==
The flag of Tamil Eelam, which is prohibited from being displayed on non-educational websites in Sri Lanka

The Sri Lankan government has a history of blocking various pro-LTTE websites such as Tamilnet and Tamilnation. A government spokesman has said that he is looking to hire hackers to disable Tamilnet.

Display of the flag of Tamil Eelam is banned in Sri Lanka. However, these restrictions do not apply to many other Tamil militant flags, such as the flag of the People's Liberation Organisation of Tamil Eelam (PLOTE), a former Tamil militant group turned pro-government paramilitary group and political party which split from the LTTE.

Promoting the LTTE through any social network is a punishable offense in Sri Lanka.
