= Economic impact of the 2026 Iran war =

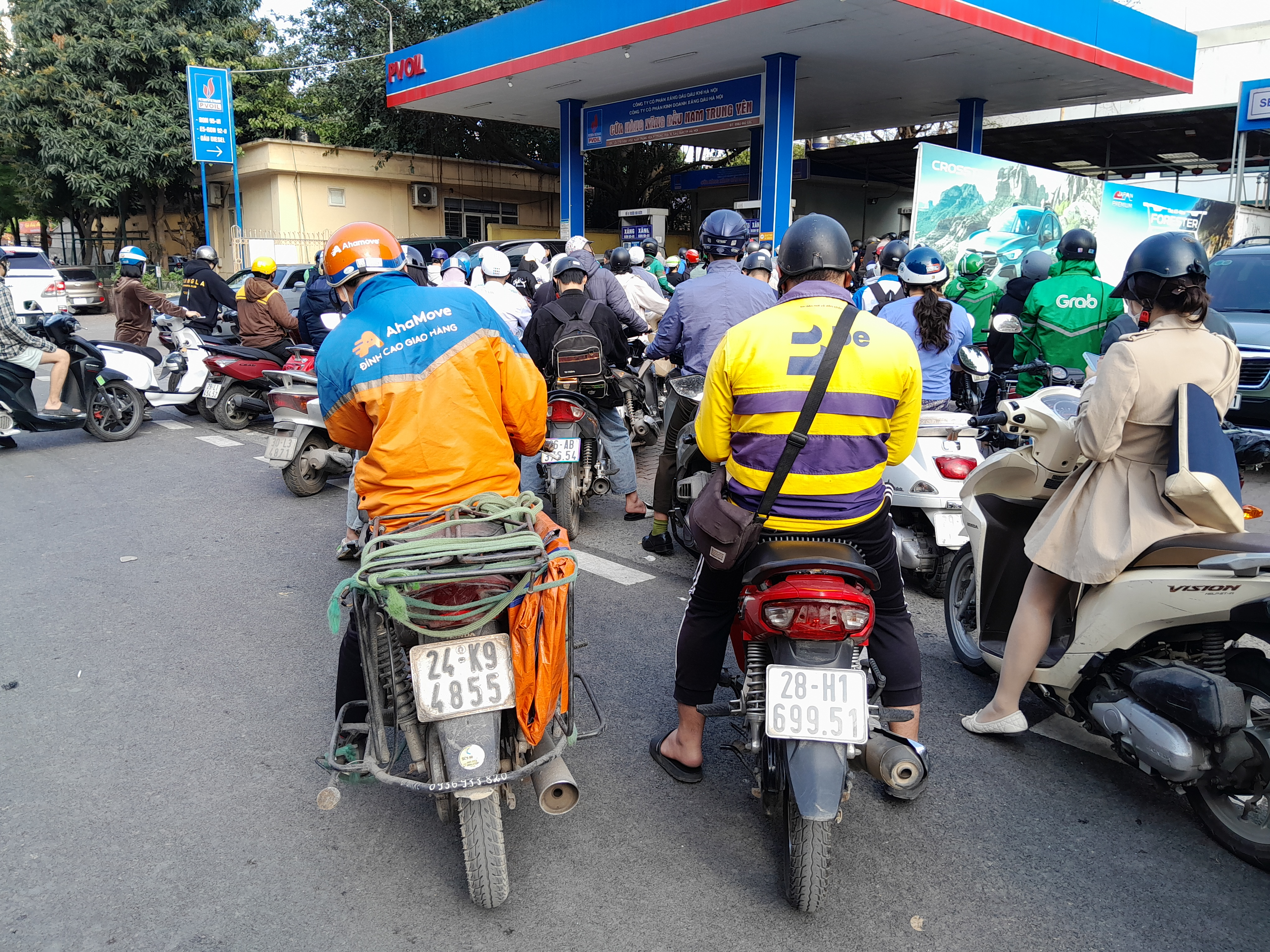
A queue of motorcyclists at a PV Oil petrol station in Hanoi, Vietnam on 10 March 2026. Vietnam faces shortages of fuel and panic buying.

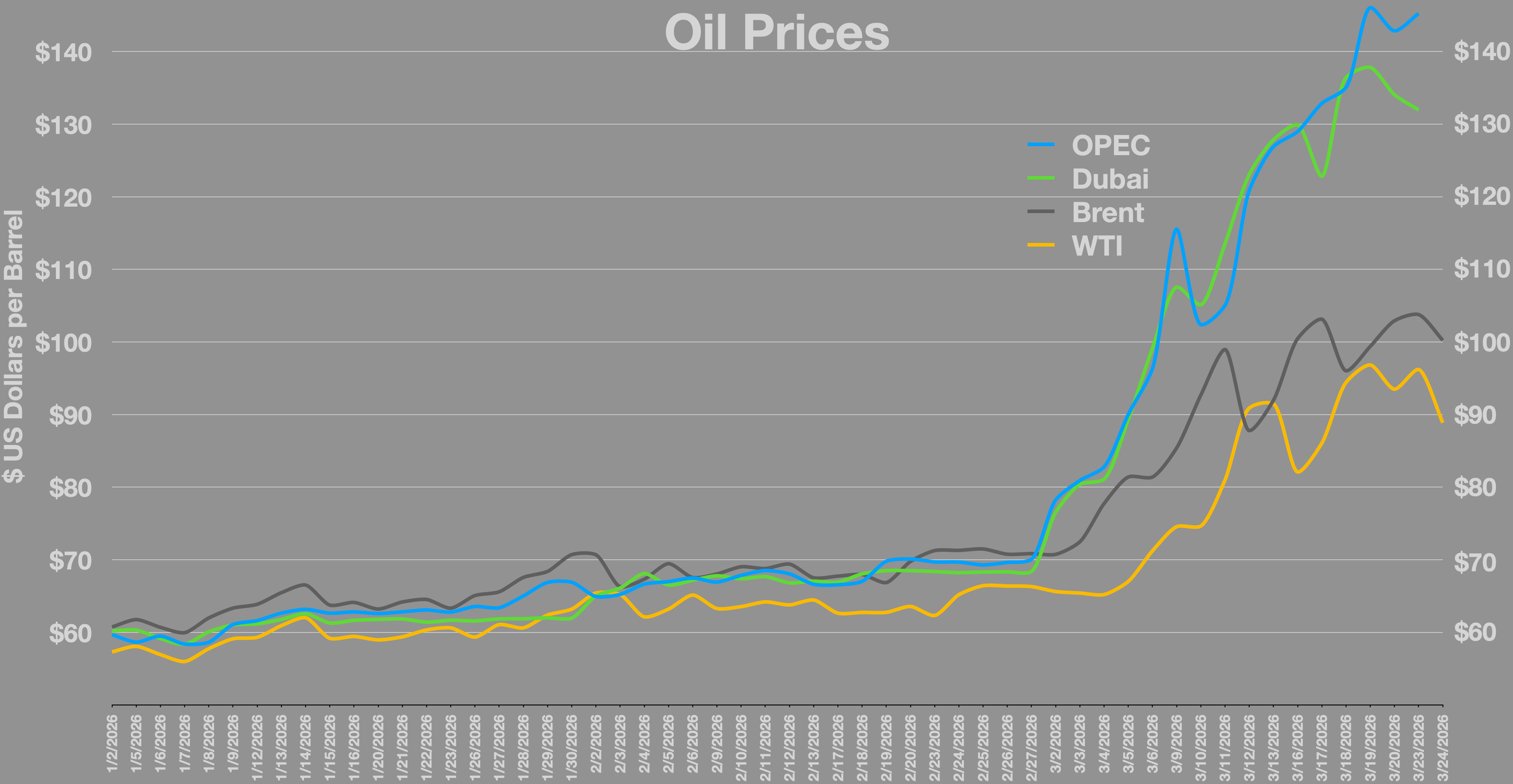
Oil prices OPEC Reference Basket Dubai Crude Brent Crude West Texas Intermediate

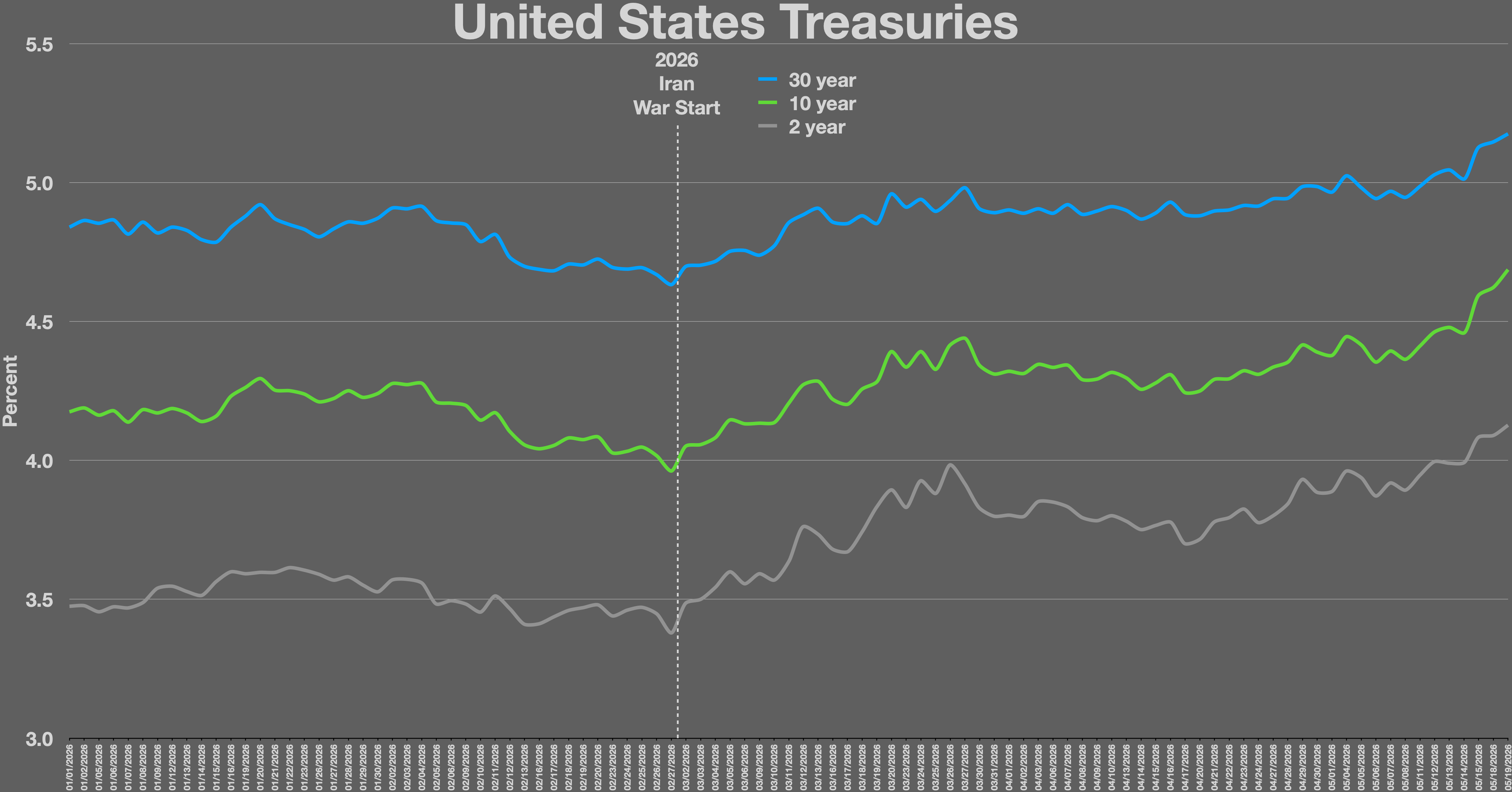
US Treasuries during Iran War

The 2026 Iran war, including the closure of the Strait of Hormuz, has led to what the International Energy Agency has characterized as the "largest supply disruption in the history of the global oil market". The conflict has echoed the 1970s energy crisis through acute supply shortages, currency volatility, inflation and heightened risks of stagflation and recession. A 2026 market analysis by MCB Group placed the current disruption alongside four earlier oil-market shocks, noting that in each case the initial price spike proved larger than the eventual sustained increase. The 1990–91 Gulf War saw oil prices decline within about nine months of the initial spike, according to a survey of historical oil shocks. A similar pattern followed the 2003 Iraq War. The Congressional Research Service found that oil prices, after rising sharply at the outset of the conflict, returned to pre-crisis levels within a few months. Brent crude's rise to nearly $130 a barrel after Russia's 2022 invasion of Ukraine but fell back over the following months. MCB Group similarly noted that a $10–15 per barrel risk premium associated with the June 2025 Twelve-Day War between Israel and Iran dissipated within days after the ceasefire.

As the result of the crisis, interest rate reductions were expected to be postponed or conversely increased in light of higher inflation caused by supply shortages and speculation. Stock markets experienced declines globally and there was a global bonds market sell-off. Nevertheless, since the S&P 500 hit 6,316.91 points on March 30, 2026, it increased 17.3% closing at 7,411.98 points on July 24, 2026.

Nevertheless, as tension eased, brent prices fell from a pick of $118.35 in March 31, 2026 to $71.57 in July 01, 2026. As tension in the gulf started to increase the brent price increased to $100.69 in July 23, but in July 24, despite mounting threats by U.S president Donald Trump, the brent price closed at $96.78. Moreover, oil shipping index which picked to 3,737 in March 2026 has declined to 1,850 in July 2026.

== Background ==
The 2026 Iran conflict began on 28 February, with joint US–Israeli airstrikes targeting Iranian leadership and military infrastructure, including a decapitation strike that assassinated Supreme Leader Ali Khamenei. The operation, codenamed "Operation Epic Fury" by the US, involved advanced military equipment costing millions of dollars, such as precision-guided munitions and stealth aircraft. Iran retaliated with missile and drone strikes on US and Israeli targets, as well as Gulf states hosting US forces, leading to airspace closures and attacks on infrastructure. Prior to the conflict, Iran's economy was strained by sanctions, protests, and a depreciating rial, with inflation exceeding 40% in 2025. The strikes intensified these pressures, while global markets reacted to fears of supply chain disruptions.

Moreover, some economists have argued that modern economies are less vulnerable to oil shocks that in the 1970s, citing lower oil intensity, more flexible labor markets, and more credible monetary policy. A similar pattern has been found using geopolitical risk indices more broadly. On July, the IMF revised its world GDP growth rate to 3% for 2026 and 3.4% in 2027. The forecasted growth rate is higher than the actual growth rates in 2023–2025. According to IMF the effect of the oil supply shock on the world economy is limited since the AI-driven demand offsets the negative effect of the oil supply shock. Moreover, according to the WSJ July 2026 survey of 74 economists, the consensus remains that the U.S. economy will avoid a recession, with the average probability of a downturn over the next year falling to 25% from 33% in the previous survey.

Arab states of the Persian Gulf as well as Iran itself rely on the Strait of Hormuz for their energy exports and grocery imports, with only Saudi Arabia and UAE having alternative, albeit limited, routes. The war has caused a systemic collapse of the Gulf Cooperation Council economic model. Following the closure of the Strait of Hormuz on 4 March 2026, oil and LNG exports were stranded, causing Brent Crude to surge past $120 per barrel and forcing QatarEnergy to declare force majeure on all exports.The oil production of Kuwait, Iraq, Saudi Arabia, and the United Arab Emirates collectively dropped by a reported 6.7 million barrels per day by 10 March, and by at least 10 million barrels per day as of 12 March. The maritime blockade triggered a concurrent "grocery supply emergency" across Gulf Cooperation Council states, which rely on the Strait for over 80% of their caloric intake; by mid-March, 70% of the region's food imports were disrupted, forcing retailers like Lulu Retail to airlift staples, resulting in a 40–120% spike in consumer prices. The crisis has shifted from a fiscal contraction toward fears about a humanitarian crisis following Iranian strikes on desalination plants—the source of 99% of drinking water in Kuwait and Qatar. The regional aviation sector, including Emirates and Qatar Airways, faced a near-total cessation of operations due to multi-national airspace closures, causing widespread disruption to global air travel. A United Nations Development Programme study released on 30 March estimated that the war could reduce economic growth in Arab nations by $120–194 billion in GDP.

Beyond immediate trade disruptions, analysts have noted a profound shift in the region's long-term economic narrative. Deutsche Welle reported that the Gulf states are unlikely to sustain high levels of investment spending during or after the war. The conflict has been described as the "end of the narrative" that the Gulf is a permanently safe destination for expatriates, immigrants, and tourists; the Qatar-funded Middle East Council on Global Affairs suggested the war has "irreversibly shaken" the region's image, exposing a deep-seated fragility beneath the facade of the Gulf's rapid economic transformation. Sinem Cengiz, a Kuwaiti journalist, conveyed in her article how the immeasurable social and psychological impact in the economic, political and security spheres were unlikely to fade.

The war has precipitated a second major energy crisis and subsequently economic crisis for Europe, primarily through the suspension of Qatari liquefied natural gas (LNG) and the closure of the Strait of Hormuz. The conflict coincided with historically low European gas storage levels—estimated at just 30% capacity following a harsh 2025–2026 winter—causing Dutch TTF gas benchmarks to nearly double to over €60/MWh by mid-March. Consequently, the European Central Bank (ECB) postponed its planned interest rate reductions on 19 March, raising its 2026 inflation forecast and cutting GDP growth projections, with economists warning that energy-intensive economies face high risks of technical recession if the maritime blockade persists through the summer refill season. The crisis has further impacted industrial output in the United Kingdom and the EU, where chemical and steel manufacturers have imposed surcharges of up to 30% to offset surging electricity and feedstock costs, potentially leading to permanent deindustrialization in some sectors. The economic impact on Europe has been characterized by a severe energy-supply shock and industrial strain, with the European Central Bank (ECB) warning that a prolonged conflict will likely trigger a period of stagflation, a period of low growth rates accompanied by inflation, and push major energy-dependent economies, including Germany and Italy, into technical recession by the end of 2026. British company Shell had issued a warning that Europe could face a shortage of fuel as early as April.

The rest of the world has been affected by panic buying and severe disruption to the distribution of petroleum, much of which is sourced from the Middle East and transits the Strait of Hormuz, the latter blockaded by Iran in early March 2026. The Philippines declared a state of emergency on the 24th March due to a concurrent strike by transport workers, while other countries such as Zimbabwe, Pakistan, Bangladesh, Nigeria, and Vietnam face similar predicaments with severe shortages of fuel. However other countries such as Australia and India have more sufficient reserves but face challenges with panic buying and their "crisis is almost entirely man-made". Economies most reliant on the strait for energy imports are in Asia, with Europe also viewing the strait as vital for its energy security. The initial disruption of petroleum is expected to affect Asia the most, but Europe is likely to be hit hard in the medium-to-long term.

Due to related increased tensions in Houthi Yemen, commercial vessels have been avoiding the Bab-el-Mandeb strait and the Suez Canal route in preference to the Cape of Good Hope to reach the Indian Ocean. The official entry of the Houthis into the war on 28 March has raised fears of disruption to global shipping and consequent supply shortages. Additionally, the simultaneous war between Afghanistan and Pakistan has disrupted airspace and trade routes through Central Asia.

== Global ==
=== Energy markets ===
The price of oil has been affected internationally at the times of the COVID-19 pandemic, the 2022- Russo-Ukrainian war and the 2026 Iran war.

In 2024, 20% of the world's liquified natural gas (LNG) was transported through the Strait of Hormuz.

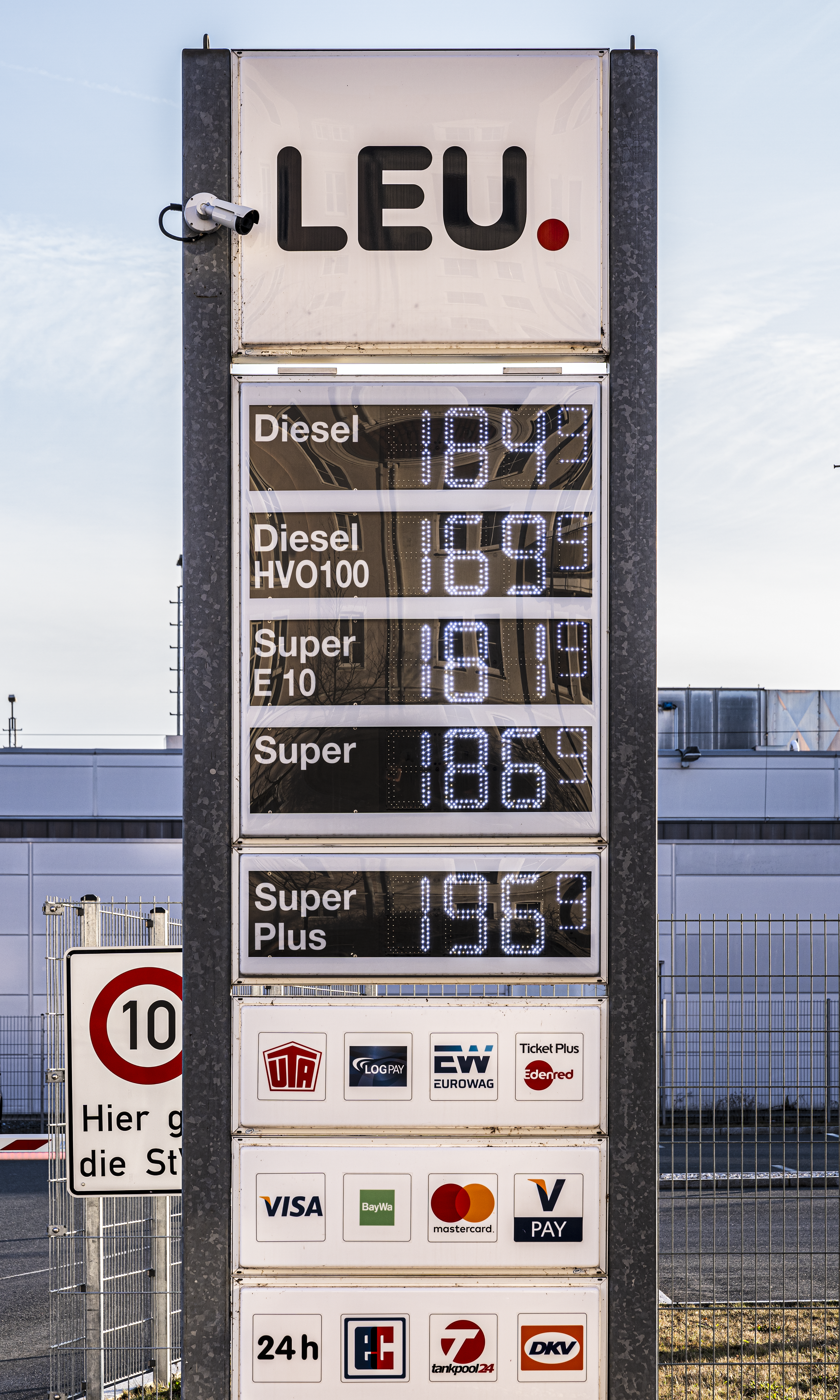
Petrol gas prices measured in euros and in liters in Germany on 3 March 2026

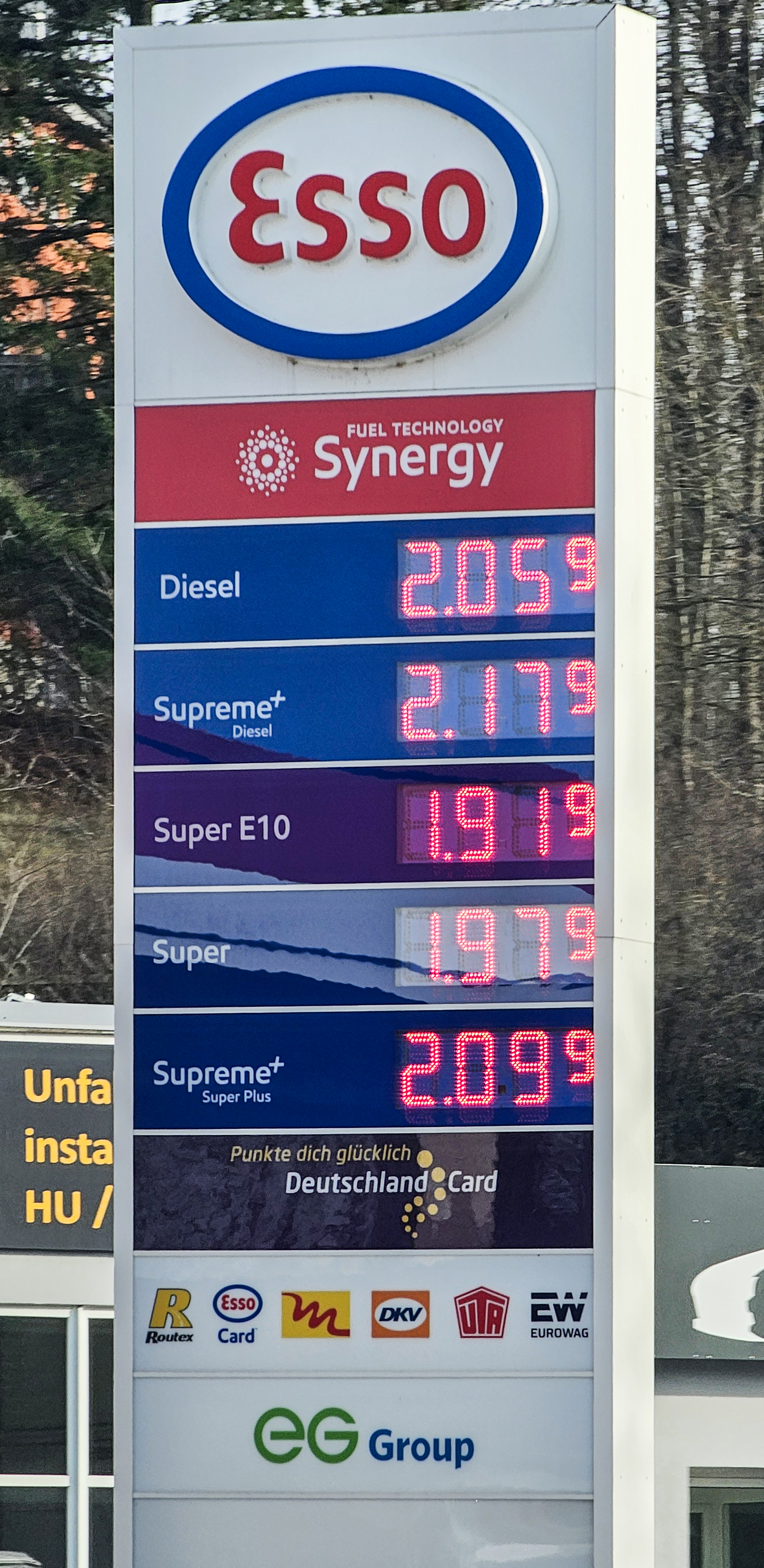
Petrol gas prices measured in euros and in liters in Germany on 8 March 2026, note the increase in price compared to a week earlier.

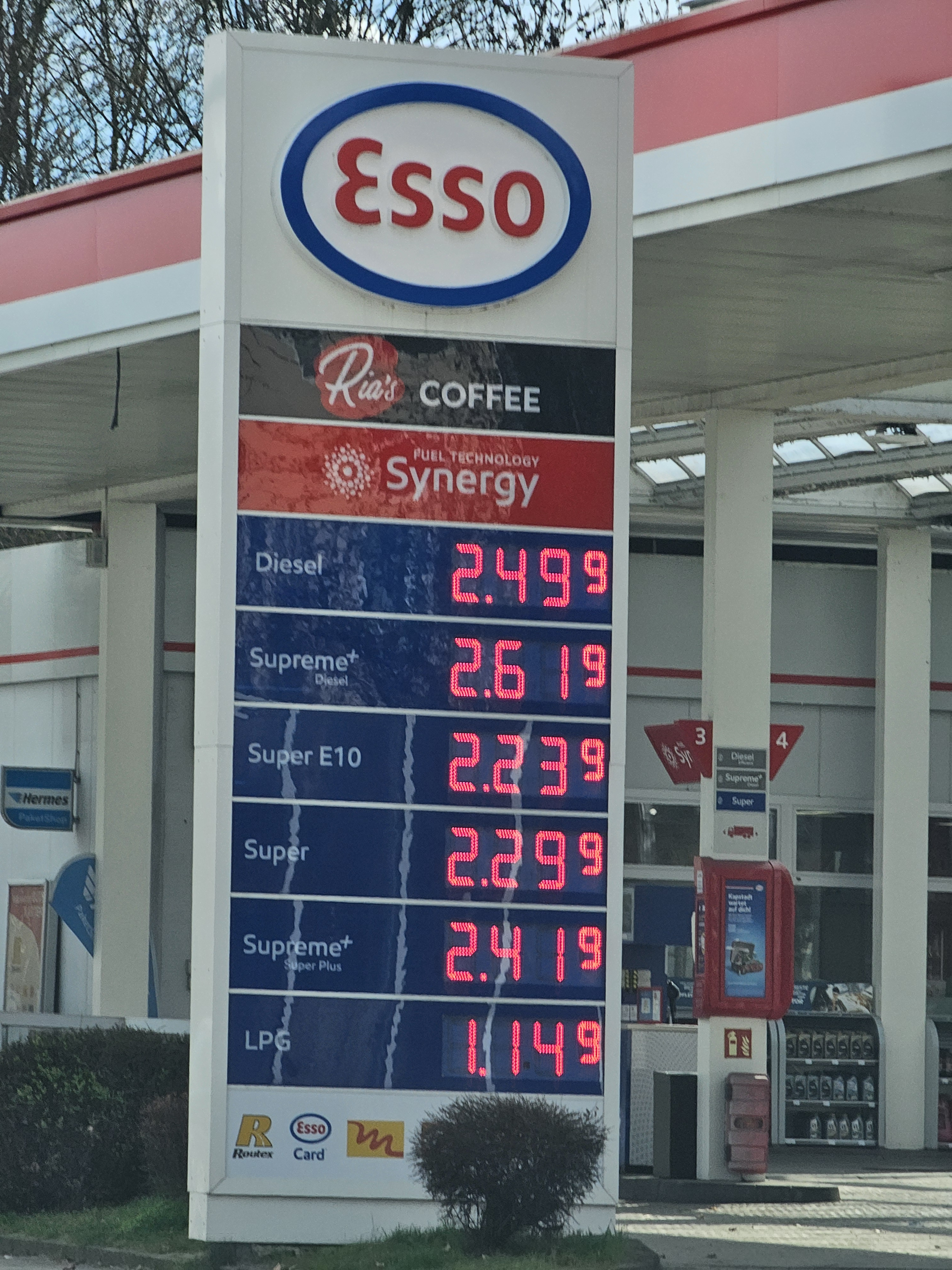
Petrol gas prices measured in euros and in liters in Germany on 4 April 2026, note the increase in price compared to a month earlier.

The head of the International Energy Agency described the situation caused by the war as the "greatest global energy security challenge in history". The conflict caused immediate volatility in energy markets, with Brent crude oil prices surging 10–13% to around $80–82 per barrel by 2 March 2026. Iran's closure of the Strait of Hormuz disrupted 20% of global oil supplies and significant liquefied natural gas (LNG) volumes. Exports from the region are typically going to Asian countries, with China, India, Japan and South Korea accounting for 75% of oil and 59% of LNG exports. However, Singapore and Taiwan depend more on Qatari LNG, while Pakistan and Bangladesh are more price sensitive.

QatarEnergy later announced that it was declaring force majeure on its contracts with buyers, and internal sources, according to Reuters, said that it would soon be shutting down gas liquefication as LNG tankers could not leave the Gulf, and that restarting it would take weeks. These announcements caused increases in world gas prices, which analysts said was a part of the Iranian government's plan to apply pressure on the world to stop the war. On 6 March, al-Kaabi warned that if the war continues other Gulf energy producers may be forced to halt exports and declare Force Majeure, and that "this will bring down economies of the world".

On 6 March, it was reported that according to satellite imagery analysis by both Bloomberg and the Energy Economics and Society Research Institute in Tokyo, Ras Laffan, the main gas facility in Qatar, appears to have not been damaged before the "unprecedented shutdown" which sent fuel prices higher. The United States, buffered by domestic production, faced less direct impact but saw gasoline prices rise 5–10 cents per gallon daily. The British think tank The Food Policy Institute has warned of long-term increases in food prices due to disruption in fuel and fertilizer markets.

On March 18, Iran hit Qatar's inactive Ras Laffan Industrial City LNG complex, causing a 17% reduction in Qatar's LNG production capacity. The damages from this attack were estimated to require 3–5 years to fully repair. Consequently, LNG spot prices in Asia increased by over 140 %.

The blockade of the Strait of Hormuz, the route of approximately 20% of the seaborne crude oil and LNG exports, keeps energy supply tight.

By 28 March, analysts feared that another hard oil crisis would unfold that was expected to be very decisive to the global economy. Three days later oil prices hit US$4 per gallon, as the war with Iran caused a surge of 30% in gas prices.

Vitol CEO Russell Hardy said on 21 April 2026 that one billion barrels of oil production would be lost because of the war, and that the current loss was between 600 and 700 million barrels. The International Energy Agency called the Iran war the greatest global energy security challenge in history by May, with oil prices hitting $4.50 per barrel and heading swiftly towards $5.00.

Since reaching a peak of $118.35 on March 31, 2026, brent prices fell $71.57 in July 01, 2026. As war tensions started to mount, the brent price increased to $100.69 in July 23, but in July 24, the brent price closed at $96.78. Also, oil shipping index which picked to 3,737 in March 2026 has declined to 1,850 in July 2026.

According to the International Energy Agency's September 2026 report, diesel and gasoil prices in the United States climbed past $200 per barrel in early September — a figure 94% higher than pre-war levels.

According to a May 2026 report by Brown University's Costs of War project, higher gasoline and diesel prices following the outbreak of the Iran war had cost U.S. consumers upwards of $40 billion, or more than $300 per household.

Rising costs resulting from the high price of gasoline and diesel have led to increased dissatisfaction with Trump's performance. Data from Kpler on October 7, 2026, shows that crude oil prices continue to stay elevated, despite Middle Eastern oil exports approaching pre-war levels.

Also, according to a Reuters report on November 2, 2026, rising energy costs and supply chain disruptions due to the ongoing US-Israeli war with Iran have intensified pressure on factories around the world and reduced their profits.

Jorge León, the head of geopolitical analysis at energy research company Rystad Energy, stated that after the crisis ends the refilling of reserves and the desire of many countries for larger stockpiles to improve energy security will keep oil prices high for many years.

=== Aviation ===
EU airlines' travel between Europe and Asia is restricted to two corridors to avoid war zones and prohibited airspace. Airspace closure due to Russia-Ukraine war Airspace closure due to 2026 Iran war Open airspace but sustained attacks during 2026 Iran war

Aviation has been significantly disrupted due to the closure of airspace on key flight corridors between Africa, Asia and Europe. Airlines have been rerouting flights along longer flight paths that circumnavigate the Middle East, adding to journey time and fuel costs, whereas several major airports in the Middle East have also been closed which collectively handle around 15% of global air traffic. The war more than doubled the price of kerosene-based products like diesel and jet fuel, as refineries lack certain types of crude oil. Many airlines have increased ticket prices or cancelled flights to maintain cashflow. Thousands were left stranded globally and repatriation efforts were described as the biggest since the COVID-19 pandemic or World War II.

Bahrain, Iraq, Israel, Kuwait, Qatar, Syria and the UAE closed their respective airspace following the attacks, with multiple airliners being redirected to other destinations. Iran's airspace was largely empty of civilian aircraft following the initial strikes on 28 February as regional states closed airspace. The major airlines of the Middle East, including Emirates, Etihad and Qatar Airways, suspended all operations, facing major disruptions, leading to losses estimated at in billions. International airlines like Air India, Biman Bangladesh Airlines, British Airways, Cathay Pacific, IndiGo, Lufthansa, Virgin Atlantic, and Wizz Air also suspended services to the Middle East in view of the conflict. Airspace closures in the UAE, Qatar, Kuwait, Bahrain, and other Gulf states have led to over 4,000 daily flight cancellations, stranding hundreds of thousands of passengers. Dubai International Airport and Abu Dhabi sustained damage from Iranian strikes, while planes in Kuwait were grounded after airport hits.

Iran's airspace emptied of civilian aircraft during the conflict, as Bahrain, Iraq, Israel, Kuwait, Qatar, Syria and the UAE closed their respective airspaces. Some carriers suspended service to the Middle East. The disruption in global oil supply, caused by the closure of the Strait of Hormuz during the conflict, led to higher jet fuel prices, which increased operating costs for airlines and pushed up airfares on both domestic and international routes. Airlines responded by raising ticket prices and adjusting some flight schedules to cope with higher fuel costs. This impact was also visible in Europe, where continued disruptions in energy supply routes contributed to higher fuel prices and additional pressure on airlines. As a result, some carriers reduced capacity or cut flights, while others passed increased costs directly on to passengers. Spirit Airlines, an American low-cost airline, ceased operations on 2 May 2026, after increased fuel costs from the war exacerbated its existing financial difficulties.

=== Financial markets ===
Global stock markets declined, with the Dow Jones falling over 400 points and the S&P 500 dropping 0.7% on 2 March. European and Asian indexes fell 1–2%, reflecting fears of inflation and supply chain issues. Gold prices rose as a safe-haven asset, while airline stocks like United Airlines dropped 6%. Emerging markets as a whole were adversely affected by the war, while the value of the US dollar rose in the war's first days. Prolonged conflict risked a global recession, with higher energy costs eroding consumer spending and industrial competitiveness. Developing economies faced currency pressures, while central banks grappled with rate decisions amid inflation, limiting central banks' ability to cut interest rates. Emerging markets experienced currency pressures from a stronger US dollar.

Financial markets saw volatility, with stock indices like Japan's Nikkei dropping over 2%. On 2 March, the KSE 100 index witnessed a market halt and recorded its largest-ever single-day decline, losing 16,089 points, or 9.57%, to close at 151,973 points. South Korea's KOSPI index suffered its biggest crash since the 2008 financial crisis, dropping up to 12% in a single day and triggering a circuit breaker on 4 March. The Thai Stock Exchange also imposed a trading curb after an 8% decline.

Following the war, most flights to and from Dubai were grounded due to geopolitical tensions in the Middle East, disrupting gold shipments. According to some experts, the disruption caused significant price swings in target markets, including India, where gold prices went from a $50 discount to the London price in a matter of days. The expansion of military conflicts in the Middle East has posed a new shock to the US economy, which was already struggling with tariffs, persistent inflation, and declining employment. According to the Anadolu Agency, Iran's retaliatory attacks on US bases in Qatar, the UAE, and Bahrain have injected uncertainty into global markets and raised alarm bells for economic policymakers in Washington.

A Financial Times investigation found that US$580 million bets on falling oil prices had been placed with the stock market by selling futures just 15 minutes before Donald Trump published his statement on postponing attacks on Iran for talks on 23 March 2026, which caused oil prices to fall for a while. This resulted in speculation about insider trading and calls for further investigation. A second suspicious series of bets, worth US$950 million, on falling oil prices happened on 7 April 2026, again shortly before a policy shift was announced by Donald Trump, this time a two-week cease fire with the opening of the Strait of Hormuz. A third series of suspicious bets on falling prices happened on 17 April 2026 with 7,990 lots of Brent crude futures, worth an estimated US$750 million, being sold 20 minutes before a statement by Iran's foreign minister, announcing that the Strait of Hormuz was open for the rest of the ceasefire.

The interest rates also surged. On 27 March the 10-year bonds yield jumped to 4.46%, its highest level since July 2025. The 30-year mortgage rate climbed to 6.38% on 26 March.

Yet, since the S&P 500 hit 6,316.91 points on March 30 2026 it increased by 17.3% closing at 7,411.98 points on July 24 2026.

=== Commodity markets ===
The near-total halt of tanker traffic in the Strait of Hormuz has caused a significant disruption in the global supply of sulfur, with Gulf countries accounting for roughly 45% of the global commodity. As a major producer of sulfur and urea, the region's supply stoppage is projected to spike fertilizer costs, metal leaching in the copper industry, and sulfuric acid. The crisis has also constrained the supply of helium, crucial for semiconductor manufacturing. The UN World Food Programme and various analysts warn that these disruptions are driving long-term increases in global food prices, threatening a scenario similar to the 2022 food crisis. According to The Fertilizer Institute, roughly 50% of global urea and sulfur exports, along with 20% of global liquefied natural gas—a feedstock for nitrogen fertilizers—transit through the strait. Disruption in the supply of essential fertilizers due to the closure of the Strait threatened food production in many countries. The Fertilizer Institute stated that nearly 50% of global urea and sulfur exports annually transited through the Strait of Hormuz, made worse by the natural gas shortage, which is a key feedstock for nitrogen fertilizers. These supply pressures are now passing through to consumer food prices. The FAO has cautioned that the buffers which once absorbed such shocks—record stockpiles and strong harvests in earlier seasons—are steadily eroding. Should key supplier governments turn to export restrictions, the risk of social unrest would grow, and commodity price increases could become more pronounced in the months ahead.

Sulfuric acid prices have risen significantly since the beginning of the conflict, driven by tighter sulfur supply from disruptions in the Strait of Hormuz and export restrictions imposed by China on key industrial commodities. According to projections by Morningstar analyst Seth Goldstein, nitrogen fertilizer prices could roughly double from 2024 levels, while phosphate prices might increase by approximately 50% Data from Kpler shows that as of 2024, Asian nations are highly dependent on Middle Eastern supply, receiving 35% of urea, 53% of sulfur, and 64% of ammonia exports from the region. Analysts warn that supply constraints coinciding with the Northern Hemisphere's spring planting season could lead to decreased usage, lowering yields for staple crops such as wheat, rice, and maize. From February 28 to March 27, 2026, Brent crude oil went up from $72.48 to $112.57 reflecting a 55.32% increase. But, as tension eased, brent prices fell from a pick of $118.35 on March 31, 2026 to $71.57 on July 1, 2026. As tension in the gulf started to increase the brent price increased to $100.69 on July 23, but on July 24, despite ongoing threats by U.S president Donald Trump, the brent price closed at $96.78. Also, the oil shipping index which picked to 3,737 in March 2026 declined to 1,850 by July 2026.

The sector of fertilizers also took a hit. Fertilizers are produces using urea and ammonia, therefore, energy cost make up to 70% of the production costs. From the beginning of the conflict until March 20 the price of fertilizers increased by up to 40%, affecting the food prices all over the world. Helium is an essential production factor in semiconductors manufacturing due to its chemical inertness and high thermal conductivity, which allow it to prevent unwanted reactions and efficiently cool silicon wafers during production. Helium is also used in medical imaging (such as MRI) because liquid helium can reach extremely low temperatures required to cool superconducting magnets. The aerospace industry also uses helium since it is non-flammable, light, and remains as gas at very low temperatures, and also in scientific research. Much of the world's helium is produced as a byproduct of liquefied natural gas (LNG). Therefore, Qatar, one of the world's largest LNG producers, is also responsible for helium production. Ras Laffan Industrial City in Qatar hosts some of the largest helium refining and liquefaction facilities, enabling the extraction of helium from natural gas processed for export. As of 2024 Qatar produces 35% percent of the world's helium production, second to the USA, with 44% of the world's production.

Consequently, helium prices, which normally were about $300 per thousand cubic feet, jumped since the start of the war to $600 and even $900 per thousand cubic feet. Sulfur is used in the fertilizers and pesticides industries. Qatar, Kuwait and Iran together produce and export roughly 45% of global traded sulfur. Consequently, since the beginning of the war, the price of sulfuric acid is now 30% higher than it was prior to the war. Tungsten is critical for armor‑piercing ammunition and other military applications. It is also an essential component in the production of semiconductors, photovoltaics, aerospace, drilling and high‑precision manufacturing die to its unique hardness and thermal stability. China, the largest producer of tungsten, with 80% of the world production, have restricted export. Consequently, tungsten's price surged over 50% in Match 2026, and more than tripling in price since December 2025.

The Gulf states produce approximately 9% of the world's aluminum supply. Due to the war, the price of aluminum increased by 8% in March. Moreover, on March 28 Iran hit Emirates Global aluminum, causing massive production disruptions. An aluminum shortage have a direct impact on automotive, aerospace, electronics, and construction industries, and also on packaging of consumer goods costs. Last year, Gulf exports made up roughly 21% of US primary aluminum imports. The Gulf also accounted for 19% of EU imports, primarily serving Italy and the Netherlands, and about a quarter of Japan's total imports. In addition, countries such as Mexico, South Korea, India, Thailand, Taiwan, and the UK depend on Gulf aluminum. This dependence means that rising aluminum prices could cascade through major consuming industries. On the other hand, gold, once considered a safeguard against economic instability, decreased in value by 28% since the beginning of the war. The instability has affected gold embroidery artisans serving the Holy Week in Spain.

=== Military costs ===
Defense Secretary Pete Hegseth, Joint Chiefs of Staff Chair Dan Caine, and Agriculture Secretary Brooke Rollins testifying before the Senate Appropriations Committee to testify on President Trump's $87.6 billion funding request for the war in July 2026

As of early April, US military costs were estimated at $25–35 billion, according to the American Enterprise Institute, and Israeli costs at $11 billion, according to Israel's Finance Ministry. Costs to the Iranian economy were estimated at $40–50 billion, around 10% of GDP. According to a report by the Center for International Policy in early May, two months into the war, the US had spent nearly $72 billion on the conflict ($1.2 billion per day on average)—nearly three times the amount of the Pentagon's official estimate. In July, U.S. defense secretary Pete Hegseth told a Senate committee that the US had spent $37.5 billion on the war; he requested an additional $67 billion to continue the war. Iran reportedly spent less on weapons than the US and Israel. For example, Iran could pay $50,000 for a Shahed drone, while PATRIOT and THAAD interceptors to neutralize the drone could cost $4 million and $12 million respectively.

The war has also increased indirect military costs due to the rapid depletion of US munitions stockpiles. According to reports, the United States has used large quantities of high-cost interceptors such as Patriot and THAAD missiles, further increasing replacement expenses and strain on defense budgets. The depletion of stockpiles has also affected US arms transfers and procurement decisions, including reports that Washington is reconsidering or delaying the transfer of Tomahawk cruise missiles to Germany and reviewing Germany's request for Typhon launchers due to limited availability. Reports also indicate delays in missile deliveries to Japan and new procurement efforts, including an $842 million agreement for JASSM-ER cruise missiles from Denmark. US officials have raised concerns that existing stockpiles may be insufficient for sustained operations in multiple theaters, including in the event of a future conflict in Asia. The Pentagon has also expanded efforts to increase production capacity through programs aimed at scaling lower-cost "affordable mass" munitions and involving non-traditional defense contractors. The US defence industry saw record stock surges during the war. As of August 2026, the U.S. Army has used "virtually all" of their stocks of Army Tactical Missile Systems (ATACMS) and Precision Strike Missiles (PrSM), two surface-to-surface missiles that cost $1 million each.

By August 1, 2026, the conflict with Iran had cost the U.S. Department of Defense roughly $38 billion, according to the Congressional Budget Office. That figure covered the replacement of expended munitions and lost equipment, along with higher operational and fuel costs. The CBO further projected that the war could add $2 billion to $3 billion in monthly expenses, depending on the intensity of the fighting, and that it could push first-quarter 2027 inflation about 0.5 percentage points above the agency's previous forecast.

According to a Forbes report from October 8, the Trump administration's war against Iran—now in its seventh month—has cost between $38 billion and $42 billion, excluding the losses resulting from the destruction of aircraft and damage to military bases. The report states that 81 U.S. military aircraft and certain bases in the Middle East are beyond repair due to the severity of the damage.

On October 18, 2026, five Democratic senators sent a letter to Admiral Brad Cooper, Commander of CENTCOM, calling on the Pentagon to disclose the cost of damages to U.S. military bases and facilities, and stating that this information should also be made available to the public. And there is “there is no rationale” for keeping the cost estimate secret. “The American people deserve to know the full cost of the Trump administration’s unauthorized war against Iran,” they wrote.

=== Real estate ===
Several economists and market analysts have suggested that the conflict could also have indirect effects on global real estate investment patterns. Previous geopolitical crises in the Middle East, most notably the 1973 oil crisis and the 1979 Iranian Revolution, were associated with significant increases in petrodollar wealth and capital outflows from the region, part of which was invested in overseas property markets, notably prime real estate in London. Scholars and property market analysts have documented the role of Middle Eastern investment in the internationalization of London's housing market from the late twentieth century onward, and noted the correlation between crises in the Middle East and strong price increases in London's real estate.

During the 2026 Iran war, disruptions to shipping through the Strait of Hormuz and heightened geopolitical risk in the Gulf led some investment strategists to speculate that similar "safe-haven" capital flows could emerge if regional instability persisted. Analysts noted that London has historically attracted international wealth during periods of geopolitical uncertainty due to its deep financial markets, strong legal protections for property rights and liquid real estate sector. However, economists cautioned that the overall impact would depend on the duration of the conflict and broader global economic conditions, including interest rates and energy prices.

== Gulf ==
The war is assessed to have caused the biggest shock to Middle East's economy in five decades. The insurer Allianz Trade announced on 11 November 2026 that the US-Israeli war on Iran would cost Gulf countries more than $200 billion in total and up to $790 billion by 2030.

=== Iran ===
Iran's economy, already contracting under sanctions, faced further infrastructure damage and revenue losses. Consequently, analysts expect that Iran's economy will shrink by 10% due to the war. Iran imports grain mainly through its Persian Gulf harbours, but struggled to fund it even before the war. Most feed-grain (mainly corn from Brazil) is imported via the Strait of Hormuz to the Bandar-e Emam Khomeini harbour. 30% of wheat is imported. By 6 March nine grain ships were outside the Strait of Hormuz, inbound for Iran. By 6 March, 4,000 civilian buildings had already been damaged by the US-Israeli strikes. Despite the economic harm by the US-Israel attacks, intelligence reports considered it "unlikely" that such damage would topple Iran's military and clerical structure in the short term, and that it would not help the fragmented Iranian opposition to seize power on its own. Russia, despite denying providing the alleged assistance, clearly benefits from the conflict's continuation, particularly the rise in oil prices. Some countries that have being receiving Iranian drones for their military development, like Sudan, have lost their continuous supply due to the damage inflicted to Iran's military capabilities. However, Iran has not necessarily cut them off completely and has only constrained how many drones they can spare.

Many of Iran's military investments were obliterated by the heavy bombings. CENTCOM said that more than 66% of Iran's missiles drone, naval production sites and shipyards has been hit, and 92% of Iran's large naval vessels had been sunk.

Natanz enrichment facility was bombed and hit on 3 March. On 27 March the Shahid Rezayee Nejad yellowcake production facility in Yazd had been attacked, as well as the Khondab heavy water complex near Arak.

On March 27, Iran's economy took another hit as Israel struck Mobarakeh Steel in Isfahan and Khuzestan Steel in Ahvaz. A company operations director at Khuzestan Steel said "all modules and steelmaking furnaces at the complex in Ahvaz had been damaged", and that it would require at least six months to repair. Damages was inflicted to storage facilities and power infrastructure at Mobarakeh Steel.

The inflation in Iran surged to new heights, reflected by the fact that the Iranian central bank issued the ten-million-rial note, the largest ever. Food inflation surged to 105%.

From March 2025 to March 2026, the price of bread and cereals increase by 140%, the price of red meat and poultry rose by 135%, the price of oil and fats increase by 219%, the price of fruits and nuts went up by 104.2%, and the price of dairy products (milk, cheese, eggs) has climbed by 116.8%. The price of furniture and household maintenance increased by 72.8%, and the price of transportation increased by 67.5%. Prices surged unequally: rural areas experienced year-on-year inflation of 86.5%, while urban year-on-year inflation is only 69.3%.

On the labor market, the war has led to widespread layoffs in Iran as many domestic suppliers have been either attacked or disrupted, and many foreign suppliers are unable to transport products due to the Strait of Hormuz crisis. Additionally, the 2026 internet blackout has caused many self-employed Iranians, many of them women, to lose access to their online platforms.

Overall, the economic toll on Iran is a catastrophic one: The Iranian regime's spokesperson, Fatemeh Mohajerani, estimated the direct and indirect cost of 40 days of war at $270bn, or 90% of the estimated Iranian GDP in 2026.

=== Arab nations ===
Many Middle Eastern countries have shut down their liquefied natural gas facilities, suspended production of oil refineries and chunks of their gas and oil exports, including strategic commercial ports were hit in the crossfire. Damage to these facilities in Middle Eastern countries could cost $25 billion to repair. Arab economists, like Qatar's Energy Minister Al-Kaabi, have adverted that Gulf energy exports may halt if war continues as the continued fighting could drive oil prices to $150 per barrel and gas prices to $40 per million thermal units, caused by the current increase in exporters declaring a situation of force majeure and suspending contractual obligations which could lead in the long term to the "collapse of world economies", but in the short term to stall the recovery of Gulf Countries for months if the war ended soon. Asia's importers, like China (a main economic partner of many countries in the war zone), saw heightened costs, while Middle Eastern economies suffered from suspended aviation and tourism.

Energy prices will rise for everyone, there will be shortages of some products, and there will be a chain of negative reactions for factories that will not be able to secure supplies

— Al-Kaabi, Qatar's energy minister

The economic impact of the conflict caused the Saudi Vision 2030 plan to undergo major changes.

According to a Wirtschaftswoche analysis, prolonging the conflict would mean a "catastrophe" for the Gulf states such as Qatar and the UAE. Iraq is even worse hit than the other Gulf countries, as oil and gas is 90% of income for Iraq's state budget, and 90% of Iraq's import of food, goods and medicine comes through the Strait of Hormuz.

Following the Iranian blockade of the straights of Hormuz Gulf countries revive of US-led plans of IMEC, a corridor that would run from India through the Gulf and then to the Israeli port of Haifa and from there to Europe. Saudi Arabia is currently considering to expand its 1,200 kilometres (750 mi) East-West pipeline built in the 1980s after fears that the Iran-Iraq "tanker war" would close the strait. The pipeline currently delivers seven million barrels of oil a day to the Red Sea port of Yanbu, bypassing Hormuz entirely.

Since the war started, oil production in southern Iraq has dropped by more than 70% and the volume of imported goods reaching the Iraq's ports has been cut in half. Zubair oil field in Basra, that produced around 400,000 barrels per day, has seen output drop to roughly 250,000 as a result of continuous attacks by Iran. This is a heavy economic toll on the Iraqi's economy since 90% of its GDP come from oil export.

In October 2026, the UAE Fuel Price Committee announced increases across all fuel categories. E-Plus 91 petrol rose 16.6% and diesel 11.6% compared with September.

==== Recession ====
Bahrain was among the hardest-hit GCC states, already being among the most indebted countries in the world, and the Strait of Hormuz crisis along with Iranian drone attacks reduced its aluminum and oil exports, which provide over two-thirds of government revenue. On 8 April 2026, the UAE signed a central bank currency swap agreement to support Bahrain's currency with AED20 billion (US$5.4 billion) over the next five years.

The economic impact of the war and the Strait of Hormuz crisis extended beyond Bahrain, affecting multiple economies across the Middle East. Disruptions to oil exports and maritime trade led to rising energy prices and increased inflationary pressures globally. Several Gulf states have experienced declines in trade activity and infrastructure disruptions linked to drone and missile attacks. In addition, uncertainty surrounding shipping routes and insurance costs has contributed to reduced investment and slower economic growth across the region, with international organizations warning of a potential broader economic slowdown if hostilities continue.

==== Food and water supply shortages ====
The Gulf Cooperation Council imports the vast majority of its food. Around 70% of their food is imported through the Strait of Hormuz. Iran's blockade of the straits has caused a severe food security challenge in the region, resulting in shortages and severe price increases on groceries.

Desalination supplies 77.3% of total water demand in Qatar, 67.5% in Bahrain, 52.1% in the UAE, 42.2% in Kuwait, 31% in Oman, and 18.1% in Saudi Arabia. Qatar obtains 99% of its potable supply from desalination, while Bahrain more than 90%. In Kuwait, Oman, Saudi Arabia, and the UAE, desalination accounts for roughly 90%, 86%, 70%, and 42% of drinking water, respectively. Major cities, like Doha, Dubai, Manama, and Kuwait City, depend on desalination for their very existence. Qatar and Bahrain also rely heavily on desalinated water for industrial use, allocating more than half of their production to sectors such as petrochemicals and data centers. As a result, any damage to or disruption of desalination infrastructure would pose a serious threat to water security, affecting businesses, industry, and potentially millions of people across the Persian Gulf. the attacks by Iran on desalination plants, has raised fears of a disastrous disruption to water supplies.

==== Exodus of talent and tourists ====
There has been a major exodus of expats and immigrants from the major Gulf states as a result of the war. Several academics and journalists from the region have written about the long-term socioeconomic impact on the region and its consequences for immigration.

There is likely to be a long term impact in the westward movement of Indians to the Middle East. Hundreds of thousands of Indian nationals have been repatriated from the region, including a high percentage of the skilled professionals and business owners, driving a 14% growth in secondary real estate markets of India. This suggests that the movement is long term in nature and policy makers in India have taken note of this; interviews of Indians who lived in the region suggests the impact of shock and trauma of the war may be long term.

Tourism in the UAE and Qatar suffered, with hotel bookings plummeting and economic hubs like Dubai facing paralysis. The World Travel and Tourism Council estimates a daily loss of $600 million in the travel industry across the Gulf states. According to a Wirtschaftswoche analysis, prolonging the conflict would mean an economic "catastrophe" for the Gulf states such as Qatar and the UAE. Major sporting events in the Middle East have been canceled or rescheduled in multiple countries due to the war including the 2026 Bahrain Grand Prix and Saudi Grand Prix Formula One races. The 2026 Dubai World Cup Night, while still scheduled to take place on 28 March, has also been affected as many participants, most notably 2025 Dubai Sheema Classic winner Danon Decile, have cancelled their plans to compete in the scheduled races citing the ongoing tension as well as disruption of air travel. The 2026 Esports World Cup, originally scheduled to take place in Riyadh, would move to Paris whilst still being scheduled for July and August 2026.

==== Real estate ====
In July 2026, Iran, in response to US attacks, plans to blockade both the Strait of Hormuz and the Bab-el-Mandeb with the help of its allies in a pincer movement to create a crisis in world trade and the global energy sector, which could lead to a recession in the Gulf countries. Since March 2026, Gulf real estate has suffered a 30% loss in value. The countries most exposed to this loss are those bordering the Gulf, such as Bahrain, Qatar, and the United Arab Emirates, less so Saudi Arabia. As of July 2026, the decline in real estate value is accelerating. While the United States aims to weaken Iran's offensive military capacity and consequently provoke a serious internal crisis against the regime, Iran aims to destabilize the monarchies and rulers of the Gulf countries. Iran wants to lead its adversaries into a war of attrition, undermining the Gulf economies in order to dissuade the United States from continuing the conflict and obtain revenge and reparations from its enemies. The United States escalated the conflict in July to push Iran into unconditional surrender without compensation. The conflict is escalating towards civilian targets, worsening the crisis; not only are oil and gas facilities hit, but also industrial plants and desalination plants, especially in Kuwait and Bahrain.

In August 2026, with the continuation of the war, the real estate market in the Gulf countries lost another 10% in value. While Iran continued to attack Bahrain, Qatar, and the United Arab Emirates, the Houthis from Yemen continued to attack Saudi Arabia, particularly its Saudi Aramco refineries. On 20 August 2026, the United States launched the Economic D-Day against Iran; however, some analysts are very skeptical about the effectiveness of this initiative, and suggest that it might instead further strengthen Iran's position, since Iran is already de facto an isolated country, accustomed for decades to economic sanctions and skilled, with China's complicity, in circumventing them. China has declared that the sanctions are illegal and that it will merely act in its own interests. Russia and China are supporting Iran militarily and financially in the conflict.

== Near East ==
The countries along the Caucasus (Armenia, Azerbaijan and Georgia) have been diplomatically cautious due to reasons linked to trade and national security. The main preoccupation is related to the high risk of being merged the Armenia–Azerbaijan conflict with the Iran–Israel proxy conflict due to the informal pro-US Azerbaijan–Israel and pro-Russia Armenia–Iran geo-strategic alliances (which also could affect the Georgian–Ossetian conflict), as also the fear of an uprising by Azerbaijani separatists in Iran backed by the US and Israel that could destabilize the local geopolitical calculations in the zone (currently based in the 2025 Armenia–Azerbaijan peace negotiations). Another preoccupation has been the exodus of foreign nationals seeking to escape the war zone through the Azerbaijan–Iran border and Armenia–Iran border. The three Caucasian countries have been calling for a quick cessation of hostilities, and the Armenian Government since 28 February established a working group (from the Security Council of Armenia) to assess the US-Israel War on Iran potential impact on the Caucasus geopolitics. For Azerbaijan there are fears that exist about the possibility of an independent Iranian Azerbaijan or a post-Islamic Republic Iran that could harm its geopolitical privileges with the Western Bloc.

Since 3 March, Azerbaijan's troops have already begun deploying toward the Iranian border as the conflict rages. This heightened military presence was justified in the fact that the Iran conflict severely escalates the risk of border skirmishes, especially if Iranian internal security collapses or if Israel uses Azerbaijani territory to launch attacks against Iran. However, Jeyhun Bayramov (Foreign Ministry) stated that "it is impossible for any country to use the territory of Azerbaijan against neighboring and friendly Iran." China warned that is highly possible that the Iran War will have spillovers in the Caucasus and spread beyond Middle East if peace isn't reached sooner with respect of Iran's territorial integrity. The Kadyrovites (Chechnya's Akhmat special forces who fought in the Islamic State insurgency in the North Caucasus) have stated that they're prepared to intervene in the side of the Axis of Resistance in case the Russian interests in the South Caucasus and Ukraine are threatened by a total war instigated by US-Israel War on Iran.

In Asia minor, Turkey strengthened the military presence in the Iran–Turkey border to safeguard its territory and airspace from the risk of spillover due to the increase of regional tensions at a "terrifying level" due to the impact of the US-Israel war on Iran. Simultaneously, Erdoğan declared that its government is closely following the development of the Iranian conflict, trying to approach to the international community in diplomatic efforts to advise the belligerent parties to refrain from steps that can increase instability and danger the global security. Turkey and Iraqi Kurdistan government discussed the regional tensions and considered to develop a common policy to end regional conflicts and Iran-backed terrorism as also the one of the Kurdistan Workers' Party. On Cyprus, protests have started against the existence of British Cyprus Bases, as also the Cyprus–United Kingdom relations chilled, both due to the Cypriots fearing that the country could be dragged to the Iranian conflict if the bases are used for offensive instead of defensive purposes, which would have catastrophic consequences for their economy and foreign policy.

Italian intelligence agencies have been reporting that it is highly possible that the entire Eastern Mediterranean region will be affected by the growing instability in the Levant and the Strait of Hormuz, mainly suffering impacts on energy markets and supply security, which will impact the Mediterranean countries and Europe as a whole if the Indo-Mediterranean trade route through Suez Canal-Red Sea is damaged by the conflict (especially if Houthis do a more active aid to Iran at the Gulf of Aden), generating a widening arc of instability across the multiple regions of Afro-Eurasia. Such catastrophic geopolitical possibility of maritime insecurity have been declared as the main reason of various western countries to deploy troops with the main goal of protect the Euro-Atlantic trade routes (particularly for Italy is a situation of critic national security due to its dependence to Mediterranean trade routes). Italian prime minister Giorgia Meloni has been developing a rapprochement between the European Union and the Gulf Cooperation Council for a common diplomatic strategy concerning the Iran-US conflict and maintaining non-participation while condemning Iranian attacks.

For the Balkan countries, the conflict is not only an energy crisis that menace their Merchant navy's interests, but it evolved from a regional dispute into a global crisis that threats their local security since the 2026 drone strikes on Akrotiri and Dhekelia on 1 March, as countries like Greece (who said it is not participating in attacks against Iran), Cyprus and Turkey are hosts of critical NATO and US naval assets that could turn the region (specially the Souda Bay) into high-value targets by the Axis of Resistance, which also harms the tourism industry if the Eastern Mediterranean is declared as an "unstable" zone. By 6 March, Bulgaria has allowed the US and Greece to use its territory to counter potential Iranian attacks, and Bulgarians have received resources and personnel for their military protection, fearing that their territory could be targeted by Iranian airstrikes due to its membership within NATO. Turkey also expressed its worries about the insecurity for Turkish Cypriots, planning to deploy air forces to North Cyprus with the mission of provide more security to the Cyprus island and avoid being merged the Cypriot conflict with the Iranian war. The Greece–Turkey relations also entered in tensions due to their conflictive interests as both countries have taken advantage of the Iranian menace to deploy their armies near the Greece–Turkey border and to secure positions to aid the conflictive Greek Cypriots and Turkish Cypriots, as both countries protesting against the other military movements while being reluctant to cooperate as NATO partners (even being denounced that the Turkish Government is secretly helping Iranians against 2026 Kurdish rebellion in Iran).

For nations in Central Asia (all of them landlocked countries), the conflict damaged its trade routes to southern markets, risking their commerce to the rest of the world through the Indian Ocean from Iranian ports (which are essential to Central Asia's trade geography to reach Europe and South Asia). The immediate consequences have been an increasing inflation risks for importers and a risk of dependence in their air and sea northern corridors through the Caspian Sea from Russia's Volga–Don Canal (which also damages their land southern corridors linking Central Asian rail and port networks to Turkey). Although countries like Kazakhstan (with oil reserves) may see stronger export revenues in the short term due to higher crude prices. In the long term, higher risk premiums will be reflected directly in freight rates on routes used by Central Asian exporters, and as insurers reassess war risk, smaller carriers and landlocked economies will absorb the cost first.

On 3 March, the foreign ministers of the "C6" countries (Azerbaijan, Kazakhstan, Kyrgyzstan, Tajikistan, Turkmenistan, Uzbekistan) spoke together by telephone about the Middle East crisis, aiming to develop coordinate responses to its geopolitical impact in the Caspian Sea and Greater Central Asia regions. Such diplomatic forum expresses a shift toward more structured regional crisis management instead of purely economic coordination like other multilateral consultative meetings in the past. The main goal is maintaining close coordination and prompt interaction amid the crisis to develop an operational diplomatic mechanism to avoid the region to be absorbed by the problems caused by the current external crises in the Iran–Israel proxy conflict, Afghanistan–Pakistan border skirmishes and American Interventionism, as also helping in the evacuations of people fleeing Iranian territory through Iran–Turkmenistan border and the Azerbaijan–Iran border.

There are fears among the governments and other commentators in Afghanistan and Pakistan that the 2026 Afghanistan–Pakistan war could also negatively impact the whole region, with the possibility of their ongoing war being merged with the Iran–Israel proxy conflict and the Iran-United States crisis. The Pakistani Government is highly concerned about cross-border clashes in Balochistan (spillover effects, sectarian tensions, or proxy and terrorist activity) due to its western borders with Iran becoming unstable, as that would endanger them with a Two-front war that they cannot afford and that could affect negatively their interests in their eastern borders on the Indo-Pakistan conflict. Pakistani prime minister Shehbaz Sharif announced emergency austerity measures to conserve fuel amidst soaring global oil prices. The measures included a four-day work week for public offices, with 50% of staff working from home, and a two-week closure of educational institutions.

In Bangladesh, the war has already created a severe fuel crisis. According to analysts, the main reason behind this is "panic buying", the tendency of buyers to stockpile in advance out of fear of a future crisis, as well as the creation of an artificial crisis by many sellers by hoarding fuel. There have been reports of long queues of vehicles at various filling stations for refueling, which has disrupted daily movement. To prevent wastage and hoarding of fuel, the Bangladesh Petroleum Corporation set a limit on refueling for various vehicles. In order to conserve electricity and fuel, all universities of the country were closed in advance for the upcoming Eid al-Fitr holidays. Additionally, all shopping centres and commercial establishments were directed to shut down by 8:00 pm.

== Europe ==
=== Second energy crisis ===
Europe is expected to suffer a second energy crisis and consequent economic crisis, primarily as a result of the suspension of Qatari liquefied natural gas (LNG) and the closure of the Strait of Hormuz. The conflict coincided with historically low European gas storage levels—estimated at just 30% capacity following a harsh 2025–2026 winter—causing Dutch TTF gas benchmarks to nearly double to over €60/MWh by mid-March.

"Just like the crisis after Russia's fullscale invasion of Ukraine. Different conflict. Same European divisions; same dilemmas over energy. We can't keep going round in these circles. Something's got to give."

— A quote of a European MEP by Katya Adler of the BBC. She writes that "You'd be hard-pushed to find a policy-maker in Europe who didn't agree with that last statement.".

European natural gas prices nearly doubled after, on 2 March, the Qatari Ministry of Defense announced that two Iranian drones attacked Qatari gas facilities, followed closely by an announcement from QatarEnergy that all gas production in the country has been halted. This raised concerns over energy security and fertilizer costs. EU natural gas prices decreased again to a less-high €48/MWh on Wednesday 4 March.

Shipping disruption contributed to volatility in UK energy markets, with analysts warning that wholesale gas price increases could raise household energy bills and expose the country's reliance on global fuel markets. The situation also renewed political debate over the role of domestic production in the North Sea, including potential reforms to the UK's Energy Profits Levy (windfall tax) on oil and gas producers and the future of investment in the sector. However, analysts noted that additional drilling in the North Sea would be unlikely to significantly reduce UK energy bills in the short term, as most oil and gas produced there is sold on international markets at global prices. Iran conflicts also bolstered the necessity for renewable energy, as solar and wind power can reduce vulnerability to external supply and decentralized power generation that offers greater autonomy from global energy markets. With fluctuating oil prices, renewable energy has become significantly more cost-competitive. British supermarket Asda also warned that it was already facing shortages of fuel at their fuel stations. On October 23, 2026, British Foreign Secretary Ed Miliband said that the country had increased its diplomatic efforts to end the Iran war. In a post on X, he noted that this conflict has caused “too much damage” to the British people and "driving up bills for families in Britain"

In September 2026, Isabel Schnabel, a member of the European Central Bank's Executive Board, said that the energy price shock was proving "much more persistent" than initially expected. Speaking at an event in Salsomaggiore Terme, Italy, she noted that price increases were no longer confined to oil but were also affecting diesel and gas. "Initially, there was still the question: 'Well, maybe this is a short-lived event,' but we unfortunately had to learn that this is much more persistent," Schnabel said. She added that the European Central Bank had raised interest rates twice, in June and September, in response to inflation concerns. On 20 September 2026, it was reported that 15% of French service stations had already run out of either diesel or gas.

Protesters marching along the Avenue de l'Europe, Aix-en-Provence, 17 October 2026

Since 18 September 2026, fuel protests emerged in France due to the Iran war and inflation from the rising fuel prices. The protests escalated into riots on 17 October as part of the wider French student protests.

In October 2026, rising diesel costs prompted warnings from UK coach operators that school transport and other services could be reduced. The average pump price of diesel in the UK surpassed £2 per litre for the first time, amid supply disruptions caused by the conflict in the Middle East. Alison Edwards of the Confederation of Passenger Transport said fuel expenses had reached unsustainable levels and asked the government for short-term diesel subsidies. Richard Smith of the Road Haulage Association said each truck was costing an additional £350 per week compared with pre-war levels.

On October 30, 2026, German Chancellor Friedrich Merz announced that the Iran war had caused European countries to pay more than 100 billion euros in additional costs due to rising energy prices. EU Energy Commissioner Dan Jørgensen also said on September 29 that the bloc has paid more than 100 billion euros in additional energy costs this year.

==== Oil company profits ====
The disruption to energy markets caused by the war also linked to increased profits for several major oil companies. According to an analysis by Global Witness, six major European oil companies (BP, Eni, Equinor, Repsol, Shell and TotalEnergies) recorded combined profits of $89 billion in the first nine months of 2026, a 102% increase compared with the same period in 2025. The disruption to shipping through the Strait of Hormuz reportedly contributed to higher oil and fuel prices and increased refining margins. Jonathan Noronha-Gant, a senior investigator at Global Witness, called the profits "obscene", and said that it is "good news" that the EU was considering taxing windfall profits.

=== Inflation ===
Economists have increased projected inflation rates for 2026 as a result of the war, with many citing an increased risk of stagflation.

The European Central Bank (ECB) postponed its planned interest rate reductions on 19 March, raising its 2026 inflation forecast and cutting GDP growth projections, with economists warning that energy-intensive economies face high risks of technical recession if the maritime blockade persists through the summer refill season. The European Union has increased its inflation forecast to between 2.6% and 4.4% depending of the severity of the war.

UK inflation is expected to breach 5% in 2026, the highest prediction for Europe.

The OECD forecasts that due to the war, the inflation in the US will be 4.2% this year, higher by 1.2% than previous predictions. Similar prediction were issued by the US Federal Reserve. Nevertheless, a 2026 Dallas Federal Reserve working paper projected using DSGE model a 0.6 percentage point rise in US headline inflation under one-quarter closure of the strait of Hormoz, while the longer-term inflation is projected to barley move. As of June 2026, the June 2025 - June 2026 inflation rate is 3.53%, the consumer price index decreased by 0.42% since May 2026, while the weekly earnings increased by 0.77% in the same period.

In March the inflation rate in the EU reached to 2.5% as energy prices increased by 4.9%. The yearly growth forecast for Germany was cut to 0.6%.

The heavy economic toll caused by the war have urged more than 40 countries to discuss how to open the Hormuz straits.

=== Recession ===
Europe is facing elevated risks of falling into a recession. Germany, the United Kingdom and Italy were at the highest risk of recession. A model by the economics department of Oxford University showed that the UK and the Eurozone as a whole were at risk of contraction. Economists at the Germany-funded Ifo Institute suggest that Germany and the Netherlands were at high risk of recession. The OECD expected the UK to be the worst hit major economy globally.

The crisis has further impacted industrial output in the United Kingdom and the EU, where chemical and steel manufacturers have imposed surcharges of up to 30% to offset surging electricity and feedstock costs, potentially leading to permanent deindustrialization in some sectors. The economic impact on Europe has been characterized by a severe energy-supply shock and industrial strain, with the European Central Bank (ECB) warning that a prolonged conflict will likely trigger a period of stagflation and push major energy-dependent economies, including Germany and Italy, into technical recession by the end of 2026. The UK was the worst hit by the war-induced global bond market sell-off, signalling weakness in the UK gilts market.

Europe faced energy security threats, with eurozone growth potentially reduced by 0.1% and inflation up 0.5%.

=== War in Ukraine ===
The EU defence commissioner Andrius Kubilius said on 6 March that US military costs were overstretched in having a shortage of key missile stocks, and the US was becoming incapable of providing enough of both military aid to its Gulf allies and military aid to Ukraine in its war against Russia. In France, the main military bases at Brest and Toulon have become nearly empty due to its mobilization of forces towards the Middle East.

Ukraine had gained experience in dealing with and producing drones in the four years between the 2022 invasion and the start of the Iran War. Following the Iranian drone attacks on the Gulf states, Ukrainian president Volodymyr Zelenskyy concluded 10-year defense cooperation agreements with Saudi Arabia, Qatar, and the United Arab Amirates on 27 March. In response to Russia's reengineered Shahed drone threat, Ukraine has developed and now exports low‑cost counter‑drone systems such as Sting. These systems might support Gulf countries in defending essential infrastructure and civilian zones outside the range of US‑provided point‑defense systems, which are largely positioned to protect American bases. A piece for Forbes by war technology journalist David Kirichenko noted that the sudden need for drone systems had provoked international interest in Ukrainian technology for its lower cost and high effectiveness, however, he noted that the country would need to strike a balance between its burgeoning defence export market, and technology needed on the front lines at home.

=== Tourism ===
On March 11, 2026, the World Travel and Tourism Council reported that the Iran conflict had cost the travel and tourism sector approximately $600 million per day. Major airports in the region have experienced disruptions in travel due to delays, closures, and security concerns, effecting travel for the estimated 526,000 people who pass through regional airports on a daily basis.

Tourism in the eastern Mediterranean was also sharply impacted due to the fallout of the war into countries such as Turkey and Greece, which holidaymakers switching their summer vacations towards other destinations and signaling a more mid-to-long term impact on tourism in the region surrounding the Middle East.

As of March 2026, the effects of the war have extended beyond the Middle East and surrounding regions. Cruise ships have also been affected, along with restaurant food prices, hotel room rates, and gas prices for road trips. Smaller countries whose economies rely heavily on tourism, such as Lesotho, may experience greater impacts than more developed countries like the United States due to inflation, rising gas prices, and taxes that are typically paid by tourists. Most of Lesotho's visitors arrive via air travel.

== Other ==
=== Americas ===
==== Brazil ====
Brazil is almost entirely dependent on imported fertilizers, with nearly half of its supply transiting the Strait of Hormuz. Given that Brazil accounts for nearly 60% of global soybean exports and is a major exporter of corn and sugar, particularly to the Middle East, a sustained fertilizer shortage or price surge could compel farmers to reduce usage, causing a drop in crop yields with significant implications for global food security.

Analysts from Rystad Energy suggested that oil exporters looking to diversify their sources from the Middle East could contribute to a fossil fuel boom by the 2030s, particularly in Brazil, Guyana and Suriname.

Brazilian beef and chicken exporters have adapted to the conflict's disruption by rerouting their shipments to the Red Sea and Suez Canal to reach Middle Eastern markets like Iraq, Qatar, markets that account for more than 30% of their export. However, logistics costs have risen as carriers avoid direct routes which pass through conflict zones.

==== Canada ====
The Iran conflict alongside the United States trade war, has significantly impacted Canada’s economy by driving up energy prices and elevating inflation. Rising oil prices have increasing transportation and input costs, placing upward pressure on food prices. Canada's 2026 growth forecast was revised down, with fears of a prolonged "energy crisis". In response to the crises, the Canadian government has introduced measures such as suspending federal taxes on fuels, and prior to the Iran conflict, implemented food subsidies. Canadian oil producers have seen high profits as global buyers look for alternatives because of the closure of the Strait of Hormuz. According to economist Tu Nguyen, the Iran war has the potential to cause increased inflation in Canada. Nguyen also reported that inflation caused by the Iran war and job cuts caused by American tariffs on Canada were the two biggest issues currently facing the Canadian economy.

==== Chile ====
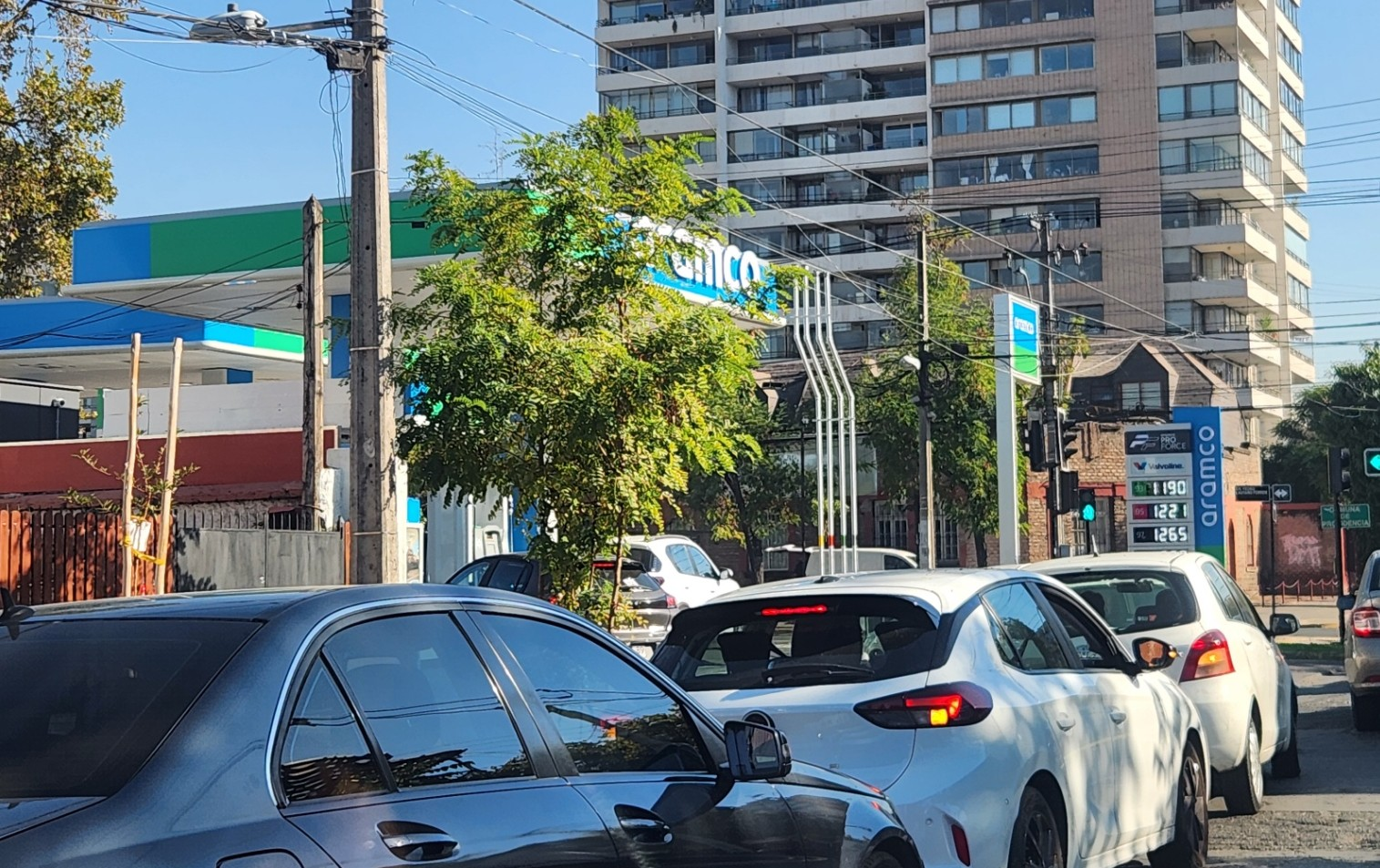
Lines of motorists waiting to refuel amidst the announcement of a price hike—a "gas shock"—at a gas station in Ñuñoa.

As sulfuric acid exports from the Persian Gulf were strangled, China responded by halting its own exports in an attempt to secure its internal supply. Copper mining in Chile has been particularly impacted as about 20% of the copper processing in the country depend on the acid much of which is imported from China. Chilean state-owned company Codelco estimated in March 2026 that the war had raised its production costs for copper in 5%.

==== United States ====
Diesel and gasoline prices in the United States

The retail price of gasoline in the US increased at the outbreak of war in Iran. In late April 2026, Trump said Americans should expect higher gas prices for "a little while".

The retail price of diesel fuel in the US increased at the outbreak of war in Iran.

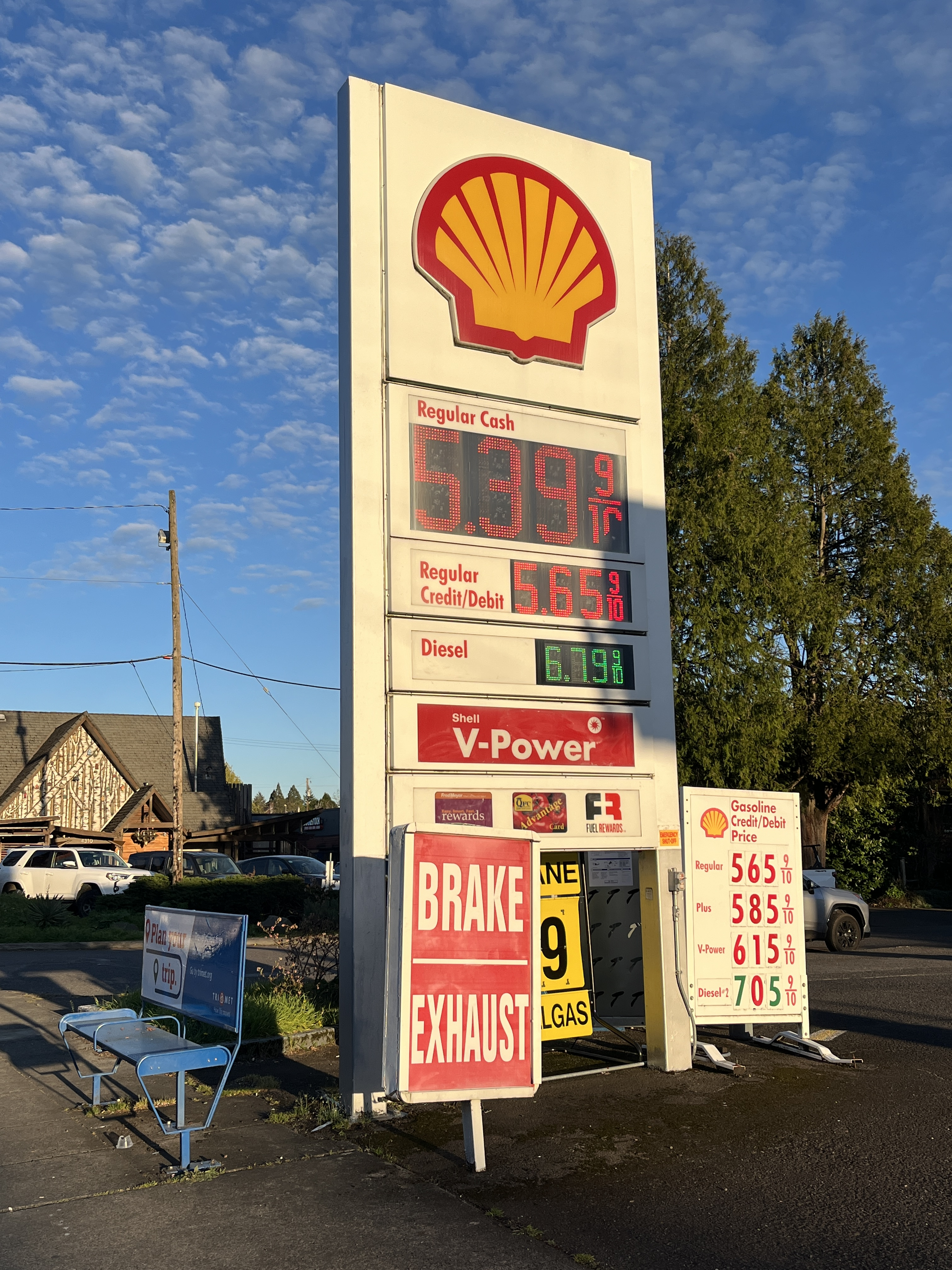
Gas prices in southeast Portland, Oregon, April 2026

In the United States, domestic energy production buffered immediate shocks, but uncertainty risked undermining 2026 growth outlooks. Also South Korea expressed its preoccupation with the move of the THAAD deployment in South Korea to the Middle East by the US, as such moves weaken the American military presence in Korea and increase the threat from the North Korean military. The second Trump administration declared that the arms industry quadrupled the weapons production to solve the projected exhaust of its defensive systems due to the military operations in the Iran War, expecting to secure the long-term sustainability of US-Israel interceptor supplies. Trump stated he is not concerned if gas prices go up, saying "If they rise, they rise." The war also puts pressure on the national budget as the cost of war exceeding $200 billion.

The first and most important blow to US markets has come from the energy channel. According to The New York Times, the suspension of tanker traffic in the Strait of Hormuz (through which 20% of the world's oil passes) and the wandering of about 200 ships in the region have disrupted the supply chain. Saudi Arabia's largest refinery and Qatar's export facilities have also been targeted by drone attacks. These disruptions have been directly transmitted to US markets, with Brent crude jumping 15% to $83 per barrel by 5 March 2026. Gasoline prices in the US rose 7.5% to $3.20 per gallon. Gasoline prices rose above $4 per gallon, the highest since late 2023. ABC News reports that rising energy prices have complicated the inflation outlook. The consumer price index rose 2.4% in January, but the oil shock caused by the war could wipe out those gains. Former Federal Reserve Chair Janet Yellen has warned that, depending on the impact of the war on the oil market, economic growth will suffer and the Fed's job of containing inflation will become more difficult.

US stock markets have also not been immune to this tension. Rising oil and gasoline prices have reduced the purchasing power of American consumers. "Rising oil prices weigh on economic growth and push up inflation," emphasize some economists, according to the Turkish Anadolu Agency. ABC News also points to the risk of reduced investment and employment: "As new uncertainty is injected into the business environment, confidence will decline, and companies will invest and hire less." If the war continues and the Strait of Hormuz remains closed for weeks, oil prices will cross $100. In that scenario, Goldman Sachs predicts that gasoline in the United States will reach $3.50 per gallon and inflation will become a permanent problem.

California's gasoline prices surged above $5 per gallon during the second week of March. Goldman Sachs says the risk of a downturn over the next 12 months has risen to 30%, driven by the surge in oil prices. The bank expects the unemployment rate to rise to 4.6% by the end of 2026, up from 4.4% in February, as hiring slows. Several firms now see inflation running closer to 3% this year rather than 2%, eroding disposable incomes and weighing on job creation. Nevertheless, Goldman Sachs also says that the Iran war does not a broad drive supply chain crisis. Moreover, some economists have argued that modern economies are less vulnerable to oil shocks that in the 1970s, citing lower oil intensity, more flexible labor markets, and more credible monetary policy. A similar pattern has been found using geopolitical risk indices more broadly. According to the WSJ July 2026 survey of 74 economists, the consensus remains that the U.S. economy will not experience a recession, with the average probability of a downturn over the next year falling to 25% from 33% in the previous survey. From the cost-benefit perspective, and despite estimating a war cost of more than $890 million a day, Kent Smetters, the faculty director of the Penn Wharton Budget Model, estimated that the cost pales in comparison to the cost of a nuclear Iran, a cost that would mount to trillions upon trillions of dollars.

On September 29, 2026, according to a report by the National Energy Assistance Directors Association, about one-sixth of American households are having trouble paying their energy bills and may be at risk of power outages. This is despite The Guardian linking the rise in energy costs to the ongoing US-Israeli war against Iran, a claim that Trump has rejected.

By October 2026, the Strait of Hormuz is partially operating again, but fuel prices remain very high, with gasoline averaging $4.36 a gallon in the U.S. Diesel prices are close to their all-time highs. This situation stems from an oil supply issue tied to the Iran war, which has now sparked a broader energy crisis affecting people worldwide. Security concerns remain high, with the cost of hiring oil supertankers rising sharply from $65,000 to $230,000 per day. Additionally, shipping risks have led to sailors being offered up to $25,000 per trip, and insurance costs have also surged, pushing round-trip oil voyage expenses to $30-$40 million. The high diesel price is despite US refineries producing at high capacity, and caused USA to import diesel from Russia, despite sanctions.

According to a report by Responsible Statecraft on October 22, 2026, American farmers are in a crisis that is the result of Washington's actions. The Trump administration's tariffs have damaged trade relations, and the US-Israeli war against Iran has disrupted energy and fertilizer trade through the Strait of Hormuz, increasing agricultural costs and reducing agricultural exports. According to a report by The Hill, the costs of the war with Iran had risen to $47 Billion, by late October 2026. Mark Zandi, an economist at Moody's Analytics, estimates that the war has added $2,000 to each American family.

==== Venezuela ====
After the US intervention earlier in the year, Venezuela was forecast to increase oil production by one million barrels a day by 2035, with an apparent oil boom coming at a beneficial time when key economies aimed to diverge oil imports from the Middle East. Europe's rise in jet fuel shipments from the US appeared to come from oil imported by US refineries that heeded Donald Trump's call to invest in the region. However, Wood Mackenzie director Dylan White suggested that Venezuela's output, despite having grown impressively between the US intervention and the start of the war, would not be enough to compensate for the disruption caused by the closure of the Strait of Hormuz, and the rise in production in Venezuela and Brazil could be stopped if the Strait reopened quickly.

Since the beginning of the year, Venezuela's oil production have surged by 28.5% from 924,000 b/d in January to 1,187,000 b/d in June.

=== Asia-Pacific ===
The Middle East is the primary source of petroleum products for the majority of Asia, including up to 60% of crude oil. The conflict has exposed Asian economies' vulnerability to a prolonged closure of the Strait of Hormuz. On 4 March LNG spot prices in Asia more than doubled to three-year highs, reaching $25.40 per million British thermal units (MMBtu) as QatarEnergy declared force majeure at its giant Ras Laffan LNG plant. Ras Laffan is the world's largest liquefaction facility and is responsible for 20% of global LNG production. The majority (around 80%) of its volumes serve customers in Asia, mostly in China, Japan, India, and South Korea. According to OPEC, insurance costs for ships carrying crude oil from the Middle East to East Asia increased 200-fold between January and late October 2026, reaching $12 per barrel.

According to analysts, growth is expected to be cut up to 1.3% in developing Asia and the Pacific countries.

==== Australia ====
Prices have risen at local petrol stations, and on 12 March, Australian energy minister Chris Bowen authorised a 60-day suspension of national fuel quality standards, allowing domestic refineries to produce and sell petrol with higher levels of sulphur, which was normally reserved for export. The action aimed to introduce an additional 100 million litres of fuel per month over a 60-day period. The wholesale diesel price rose to A$2.45 per litre by 23 March, and it was feared that the shortage of fertiliser (urea) could threaten the autumn planting season for the agricultural sector. On 24 March, the fuel quality standards were also relaxed for diesel. Although local prices had increased, Australia had not yet felt the full impact of oil supply shortages caused by the war, as there is a lag in the supply chain from Asia, and physical shortages have not yet reached Australia's shores. Hundreds of petrol stations reported fuel shortages. The government said that fuel deliveries are assured until mid-April.

==== China ====
China has been affected by disruption to the trade routes along the Belt and Road initiative that import petroleum and export manufactured goods. However, China has taken measures to mitigate potential petroleum shortages with reserves and investment in renewable energy. China has engaged in mediation efforts in several regional conflicts including Iran–Saudi Arabia proxy war, Afghan conflict and the 2026 Afghanistan–Pakistan war. China officially declared itself neutral country, while seeking to maintain relations with potential future governments in Iran, as Iran is China's third-largest supplier of crude oil (being expected an increase in China's energy import costs and overall inflationary pressures) and China has invested over US$100 billion in energy and infrastructure projects in Iran (which could be halted by the fighting or by sanctions from the US against the renminbi settlement system between China and Iran). Some surveys have reported a relatively positive public outlook toward the war in China. China restricted exports of fertilizers, including urea, to prioritize domestic agricultural needs amid rising global prices and supply chain disruptions.

==== India ====
India maintained significant economic and energy interests in the Persian Gulf, relying on the region for nearly 60% of its petroleum imports and as the primary source for over $125 billion in annual remittances sent by a diaspora of primarily low-income workers whose earnings support millions of families back home. This dependency is especially notable in the fertilizer sector, with over 40% of India's urea and phosphate sourced from the region. Following a drop in LNG output from Qatar, India reduced production at three urea plants. As a leading global food producer, accounting for approximately 25% of rice exports in 2024, this dependence may affect global supply chains during periods of regional instability.

While India was a major ally of Iran during the anti-colonial era, New Delhi has strengthened its relationship with Israel, including Prime Minister Narendra Modi's visit to the Knesset in February 2026, which some analysts argue contributed to reduced engagement with Iran, potentially contributing to closer military and economic ties between Iran, China and Russia. To mitigate the energy shock caused by the closure of the Strait of Hormuz, the US Treasury granted India a temporary 30-day emergency waiver on 6 March 2026, authorizing the purchase of stranded Russian oil cargoes to stabilize domestic fuel prices. However, the conflict has had significant impacts on the West Asian diaspora; a large-scale departure of foreign residents has followed strikes on civilian infrastructure, leading analysts to conclude that the war has challenged perceptions of cities like Dubai as stable destinations for migrant workers.

The term 'returnees' refers to a socio-economic trend in India triggered by the war. As of March 2026, over 220,000 Indian nationals have been repatriated from the Gulf Cooperation Council region and Iran due to the escalating conflict and the blockade of the Strait of Hormuz. Unlike the temporary labor migrations of the past, this reverse migration involves a high percentage of skilled professionals and business owners. Economic data from March 2026 indicates that this demographic is bypassing over-congested Tier-1 metros in favor of Tier-2 and Tier-3 cities, driving a 14% growth in these secondary real estate markets. The influx of "Returnee" capital is described by some analysts as a strategy to offset multiple economic pressures, as the Indian economy grapples with falling remittances and rising energy costs ($100+ per barrel) caused by the ongoing war.

==== Japan ====
In Japan, disruptions in energy supplies contributed to a significant rise in domestic fuel prices. On 16 March 2026, the national average retail price for regular gasoline reached a record ¥190.8 per liter, an increase of ¥29 from the previous week, according to the Agency for Natural Resources and Energy. In response, the government introduced subsidies aimed at keeping gasoline prices at around ¥170 per liter. In June, it approved a supplementary budget of ¥3.11 trillion to cushion households and businesses against higher energy costs, including a ¥2.5 trillion reserve fund to respond to developments in the Middle East. By the end of July, the balance of the fund for gasoline subsidies had fallen to about ¥210 billion, while the cumulative cost of the subsidy program had reached approximately ¥9 trillion. On 31 July 2026, as a result of the weakening yen when it hit a 40-year low, the United States launched a rare intervention to prop up the yen. This depreciation had been exacerbated by increasing energy costs as a result of the Iran war.

==== Philippines ====
The Philippines' overall supply of oil has been among the most affected, more so than Thailand and Vietnam, causing the Philippine Peso (PHP) to drop to a record low of 62.86 PHP per USD on 14 September 2026. The Philippines importing 95% of crude oil needs as well as a sluggish economy before the war was expected to push up the peso's inflation rate. Prior to that, the prices of petroleum products also increased with diesel prices in the country hiking up by 38.6%. Alongside this, electricity prices all throughout the country have also been slated to go up in response to the increase in usage during the summer months accompanied by high oil prices. In response to rising prices, several government agencies have implemented a four-day work week to reduce electricity costs. On 24 March 2026, President Bongbong Marcos declared a state of national energy emergency due to the rising oil prices.

==== Other ====
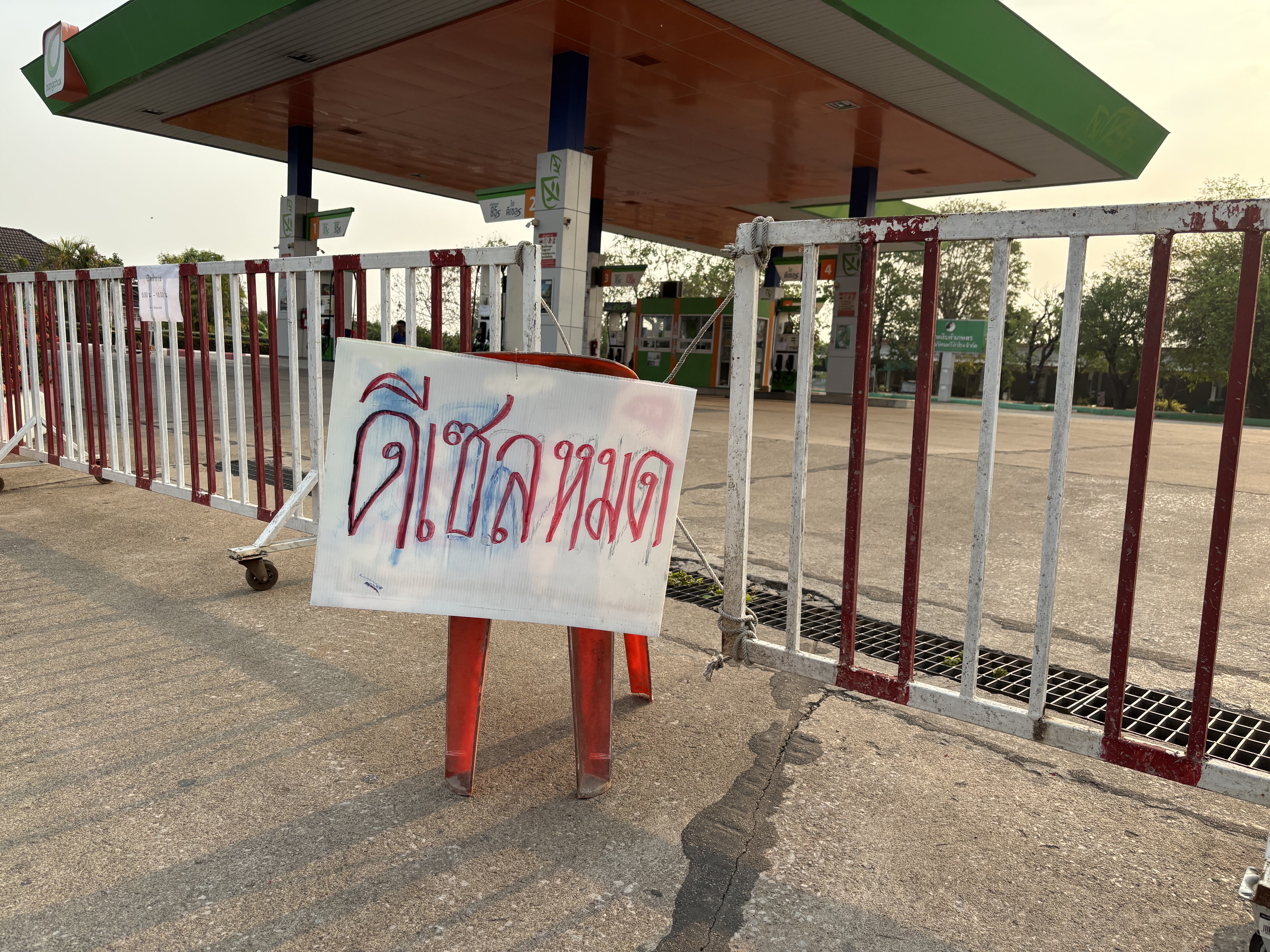
A Bangchak petrol station in Thailand closing with a sign stating "out of diesel" on 22 March 2026 as the country was hit by a fuel shortage due to its reliance on shipping via the Strait of Hormuz

The Sri Lankan government reintroduced a weekly fuel ration it had previously implemented in 2022, and brought in a four-day work week for government and public education employees to limit fuel usage.

In Bhutan, citizens made long lines outside fuel stations amid fears that the war in Iran will increase gas and fuel prices. The Department of Trade appealed for calm, saying that Bhutan has enough gas and fuel and that there is no indication of any disruption. The country is also facing an impact on global fertilisers, with most of it coming from Gulf countries.

Protests intensified in Anjouan, Comoros, over rising fuel prices partially attributed to the Middle East conflict. On 16 May 2026, one protester died as a consequence of clashes with security forces on the island.

Vietnam is expected to be impacted by a disruption in its oil supplies more than regional countries such as China and Thailand. Many tourists were stranded in Vietnam after airlines were forced to delay or cancel flights through the Middle East.

=== Africa ===
Since the start of the US–Israel war on Iran, fears have developed that it will spill over into Egypt through the Gaza theater or the Red Sea crisis. The Egyptian government has been considering the conflict as both a general threat to the security of the Arab world and a question of economic national security, due to the effects of the higher oil prices that increase the cost of imports for Egypt and place pressures on the Egyptian economy (specially by straining the public finances and complicating the efforts to stabilise the economy after the Egyptian Crisis). Another preoccupation for Egypt is that the conflict reduced the traffic through the Suez Canal, which is declining vital shipping activity and costing approximately $10 billion in losses according to the World Bank Group. This has led to a situation of near state of emergency directed against the price-gougers, who could be processed in military courts by treason due to harming the traffic of shipping companies in Suez and the national interests of Egypt as an import-dependent economy. Another indirect economical effect is that the Iran conflict quietly stalled the GERD negotiations between Egypt and Sudan with Ethiopia, as international mediators such as the US, UN and African Union diverted their diplomatic efforts to the 2026 Strait of Hormuz crisis, so Ethiopia has been operating the dam without a binding agreement with the other Nile river states.

The Ethiopia economy has been projected severe price shocks as their economy relies heavily on imported refined petroleum (Ethiopia sources the vast majority of its fuel from the UAE, Saudi Arabia, and Kuwait) due to not producing commercial crude oil. The Strait of Hormuz crisis has provoked skyrocketing risk premiums and maritime insurance costs, which translate immediately into inflated import prices for Ethiopia, while the Red Sea crisis is threatening the logistical risks due to the fact that 90–95% of its petroleum imports pass through a single chokepoint at the Port of Djibouti, which is provoking speculation due the fears of renewed Houthis attacks that will be elevating freight costs. Despite this, economists have proposed that Ethiopia could avoid the worst part of a global recession if they capitalize on its 95% renewable electricity generation (driven by projects like the Grand Ethiopian Renaissance Dam) to accelerate a shift toward electric mobility and so reducing the transport sector's demand for imported petroleum.

The Port of Berbera in Somaliland (an ally of Israel and of the United Arab Emirates, who have a military presence in the area) has been considered a military target by Houthis (and their Al-Shabaab allies). The Israel recognition of Somaliland included discussions of Israel having a military base in Berbera, with Houthis warning after the recognition that "Israeli assets in Somaliland would be legitimate military targets", risking regional stability in the Horn of Africa. Similar notices has been sent by the Houthis to the rival Presidential Leadership Council, threatening to attack any US or Saudi military facilities in Yemen on a current civil war (as also Iran has reportedly increased diplomatic engagement with Ethiopia in the context of the Red Sea crisis). Ismaïl Omar Guelleh, president of Djibouti and ally of Saudi Arabia, denounced that both Israel and United Arab Emirates are driving strategic realignments across Northeast Africa that risk intensifying current conflicts (like the Somali Civil War, Sudanese Civil War, insurgency in Chad, Libyan crisis, etc.) and a possible merging of them with the Iran–Israel proxy conflict.

In Kenya, the Energy and Petroleum Regulatory Authority announced record high fuel surges in mid-April. This resulted in public transport operators hiking their fares by roughly 25% dependent on various factors. These actions are expected to raise inflation and increase prices for basic goods and important services. Increased oil prices led to protests including on 21 April and 18 May where four people died.

== See also ==
- 2020s energy crisis
- 2026 Iran war
- 2026 Strait of Hormuz crisis
- Economic impact of the Iran–Israel proxy conflict
- Iranian economic crisis
- 2026 European unrest
