= Economic impact of the Iran–Israel proxy conflict =

The Iran–Israel proxy conflict and the direct hostilities in mid-2025 have strained Iran’s finances, infrastructure, and human capital. Iran has incurred direct costs from military expenditures and war damage, indirect costs from decades of sanctions, and shadow costs such as currency devaluation, high inflation, lost oil revenue, and the erosion of its scientific and military workforce. These pressures have exacerbated pre-existing economic weaknesses in Iran and also had regional spillover effects on energy markets and neighboring economies. During the 2025 war, Israel suffered casualties with thousands injured and displaced and 29 killed. The economic burden of the war for Israel is estimated at US$6 billion.

== Impacts on Iran ==
Category	Impact on Iran
War damage (2025 conflict)	Widespread destruction across 21 provinces (airports, energy facilities, military and nuclear sites) requiring extensive reconstruction and tens of billions of dollars in rebuilding costs.
Military spending & proxies	More than $20 billion spent supporting allied militias since 2012 (e.g. up to $700 million/year to Hezbollah at its peak).
Ballistic missile costs	A single Iranian missile barrage (Oct 2024) cost ~$2.3 billion in materiel (≈22% of Iran’s annual defense budget), far outweighing the defenders’ interception costs in terms of GDP.
Sanctions revenue loss	An estimated $300–450 billion in oil income lost over the past decade due to international sanctions. Oil exports fell to ~200,000 barrels/day in 2022–23 (under 10% of 2016 levels).
Currency & inflation	The rial has lost over 90% of its value against the dollar since 2018, plummeting to record lows (over 1,000,000 IRR per USD in 2024–25) amid war fears. Inflation exceeds 40–50% annually.
Human capital losses	At least half a dozen top nuclear scientists assassinated since 2010 (with more killed in 2025 strikes), and multiple senior IRGC commanders killed.

=== Direct financial expenditures ===
Estimating the direct costs of Iran's nuclear program is complicated by secrecy, but available assessments suggest significant expenditures.

Category	Estimated cost	Source
Bushehr nuclear plant	>$10 billion (vs $2B official)	
Broader nuclear infrastructure	>$100 billion	
Eurodif take (1970s)	$1 billion	
Hormozgan plant (planned)	>$20 billion	
Annual operational costs	$250–$300 million	
Total spending estimate	>$30 billion	

=== Indirect economic burdens and opportunity costs ===
The sanctions and lost economic opportunities outweigh direct spending:

Cost area	Estimated value	Source
Lost economic opportunity	$2–3 trillion	
Lost oil revenues	>$450 billion	
Lost foreign investment	>$100 billion	
Rial devaluation (2014–2025)	~95%	
Energy renovation cost (alternative)	~$54 billion	

=== Historical context and economic pressures ===
Since the 1979 Islamic Revolution, Iran and Israel have been locked in enmity with profound economic implications. Iran’s vehement anti-Israel stance and support for militant proxies prompted waves of sanctions that have constricted its economy since the 1980s. U.S.-led sanctions over Iran’s nuclear program (relaxed after the 2015 nuclear deal but reimposed in 2018) severely curtailed Iran’s oil exports and foreign revenue. By 2022–2023 Iran’s oil export income was only about $50 billion per year (roughly 200,000 barrels per day), less than 10% of its peak before sanctions. Cumulatively, Iranian officials estimate that international sanctions have cost the country on the order of $300–450 billion in lost oil revenues over a decade. This loss of foreign exchange has gutted Iran’s development spending, leaving infrastructure dilapidated and cutting access to hard currency needed for investment. Even before the latest conflict, Iran’s government warned that the economic situation was more dire than during the 1980–88 Iran–Iraq War, as sanctions and mismanagement led to infrastructure crises requiring over $500 billion to fix.

In lieu of direct war, Iran has long engaged Israel indirectly by funding and arming proxy militias across the region. This strategy carries heavy financial costs. Since 2012, Tehran is believed to have spent over $20 billion bankrolling foreign militias and terrorist groups. Major beneficiaries include Lebanese Hezbollah (which at one point received up to $700 million annually from Iran, about 70% of Hezbollah’s budget) and Palestinian factions like Hamas and Islamic Jihad. Iranian support to Hamas, for example, surged to an estimated $350 million per year in recent years as oil revenues recovered. These outlays, often off-budget and funneled via the IRGC’s Quds Force, divert national wealth toward foreign operations. Iran’s leaders openly prioritize financing these groups – described by Supreme Leader Ali Khamenei as the "backbone of war" – even at the expense of domestic needs.

From 2013–2017 (during the loosening of sanctions under the nuclear deal), Iran increased military and proxy expenditures by over 20%, only to cut back by 22% after oil sanctions returned in 2018. When oil revenue rebounded in 2021–2023 (due in part to covert sales to China), Tehran again boosted funding for the IRGC and militias despite economic hardships at home. This cycle shows how Iran’s proxy warfare strategy imposes a chronic opportunity cost on its economy: resources funneled into regional conflict could otherwise address infrastructure, jobs, and social services, areas where Iran now falls behind its neighbors.

Israel, for its part, has waged a long-running shadow war aimed at undermining Iran’s nuclear and military capabilities – with economic side effects. Between 2010 and 2012, at least four Iranian nuclear scientists were assassinated inside Iran (often via bomb attacks), and another, Mohsen Fakhrizadeh, was killed in 2020, crimes widely attributed to Israel. These assassinations robbed Iran of experienced talent and likely set back certain nuclear research projects. Israel also allegedly carried out cyber-sabotage such as the 2010 Stuxnet attack, which destroyed uranium centrifuges, and a series of mysterious explosions and power outages at facilities like Natanz in 2020 and 2021. Each such incident forced Iran to spend time and money repairing sensitive nuclear infrastructure and adding security, effectively raising the economic cost of its nuclear program. While exact figures are closely guarded, the disruption has been significant – for example, an explosion at Natanz in April 2021 damaged or destroyed thousands of centrifuges, prompting Iranian officials to decry the "nuclear terrorism" that necessitated expensive restoration work. In addition, since 2018 Israeli airstrikes in Syria have repeatedly hit IRGC supply lines and weapons depots intended for Hezbollah, indirectly compelling Iran to expend more resources to maintain its regional reach.

Over the past year, Israel even began targeting IRGC operatives directly; several senior IRGC commanders were killed in 2023–2024 (for instance, in alleged Israeli strikes on Iranian positions in Syria).

=== The escalation of 2023–25 ===
Tensions flared dangerously after October 7, 2023, when Hamas (a Palestinian group backed by Iran) launched a massive surprise attack on Israel. Israel’s retaliatory war against Hamas in Gaza raised fears that Iran and its other proxies might directly enter the war. Although Iran did not overtly join the Gaza war, it encouraged proxy attacks on U.S. bases in Iraq and Syria and let Hezbollah in Lebanon skirmish with Israel – moves that signaled heightened regional conflict. American officials reported that Tehran had provided Hamas with weapons, training, and funding leading up to the 7 October assault. In the immediate aftermath, Iran’s fragile economy shuddered – the rial currency plunged in value amid public expectations of harsher sanctions or even war. By late October 2023, the rial traded around 500,000 IRR per USD, a steep drop of 10–15% in just days. Iranian authorities blamed "war psychology" for driving people to hoard dollars and gold, worsening inflation. The government’s fiscal health also weakened as oil revenues underperformed: in the first seven months of the Iranian year (to October 2023) budget income was 30% below projections, partly due to lower oil exports.

== Escalation into open war (June 2025) ==
=== Destruction of infrastructure ===
Israeli bombing raids hit critical infrastructure in Iran across 21 of the country’s 31 provinces. Targets included major airports (such as Tabriz Airport and Tehran’s Mehrabad Airport), oil and gas facilities, power grids, and strategically important industries. Strikes on Iran’s oil infrastructure were limited but not negligible – for example, Israeli missiles struck an oil refinery in southern Tehran (Shahr Rey refinery), causing a massive fire and forcing its shutdown. They also hit fuel depots around the capital, and even a section of the giant South Pars gas field (which provides ~80% of Iran’s gas) was damaged by missile strikes, leading Iran to temporarily suspend part of its gas output. The war targeted some "domestic" energy assets rather than export terminals, so Iran’s export capacity was somewhat spared; nevertheless, the immediate effect was dramatic – Iran’s oil exports in the week of 18 June 2025 fell to roughly 102,000 barrels per day, less than half the recent average. Tanker traffic from Iran’s main export port (Kharg Island) virtually halted during the height of the conflict. This translates to tens of millions of dollars in lost revenue for those weeks and underscores how vulnerable Iran’s income is to security disruptions. Beyond energy, Israeli strikes also hit military and nuclear sites, research facilities, and government buildings in Tehran (even the Defense Ministry and state TV headquarters were bombed). Iran’s civilian infrastructure did not escape damage either – power stations and communication networks suffered outages from the raids and accompanying cyber attacks. The physical damage to Iran will require major reconstruction. Conservative estimates put the immediate rebuilding cost in the tens of billions of dollars for power grids, refineries, transportation networks, and other facilities.

=== Military expenditures and losses ===
Over the 12 days, Iran launched hundreds of ballistic missiles and drones at Israel. These weapons are costly to replace. Analysts estimate that Iran’s medium-range ballistic missiles cost on the order of $1–3 million each. A single concentrated salvo on 1 October 2024 (prior to the all-out war) involved about 180 missiles and was calculated to have cost Tehran roughly $2.3 billion in missiles and related expenses. This was an immense one-day expense – equivalent to about 22% of Iran’s annual defense budget and over 50 million percent of Iran’s GDP per capita. During the June 2025 war, Iran fired 550 missiles and launched 1000 drones.

=== Nuclear program setbacks ===
A focal point of Israel’s offensive was Iran’s nuclear infrastructure. Key nuclear sites at Natanz, Fordow, and Isfahan were struck, including with U.S. "bunker buster" bombs on June 21, 2025. These attacks damaged Iran’s enrichment plants - for instance, Israel claimed to have heavily damaged Natanz’s underground halls containing advanced centrifuges. Vital support infrastructure (power supplies, centrifuge workshops, etc.) was also hit, likely knocking the facilities offline.

=== Human casualties and talent drain ===
At least 610 Iranian civilians were killed and over 4,700 injured by Israeli strikes, according to Iran’s Health Ministry Dozens of important personnel were also eliminated. The strikes killed at least six top nuclear scientists and engineers who were present at targeted sites. Among them were figures like Dr. Fereydoun Abbasi (former head of the Atomic Energy Organization) engineering. Around 20 senior commanders were assassinated in precision strikes. Those killed included some of the country’s highest-ranking officers – notably General Mohammad Bagheri (Chief of Staff of Iran’s armed forces) and Major General Hossein Salami (Commander of the IRGC). The death toll also encompassed many IRGC regional commanders and missile experts.

=== Market effects ===
By late June 2025, with U.S. President Donald Trump warning of worse to come, the rial traded well above 1,000,000 IRR per USD in street markets. After the war the Tehran stock exchange saw sell-offs in many sectors. Gold prices fell by 2% after Trump announced ceasefire.

== Impacts on Israel ==
During the ceasefire, it was reported that the death toll was at 29 killed, over 3,238 injured (including 28 in serious condition, 111 in moderate condition), and over 9,000 others displaced. According to the Israel Central Bank Governor the economic cost of the 12 days war with Iran is $6bn.
