= 2026 U.S.–Japan yen intervention =

July 2026 economic event to support yen

In July 2026, the United States and Japan launched a rare joint currency intervention to strengthen the Japanese yen currency after it hit a 40-year low against the U.S. dollar. The effort, led by the Donald Trump administration, was done to protect U.S. Treasury holdings overseas and to keep the global economy stable. Financial analysts note that while the intervention general was effective in strengthening the yen in the short term, changes in Japan's monetary policy and economic conditions will be necessary to reverse the yen's long term decline.

== Background ==
=== Previous U.S.-led yen interventions ===
The United States has rarely attempted to influence Japan's yen currency, as there have only been a handful of U.S.-led or U.S.-supported yen interventions since exchange rates began floating in the 1970s. The first joint U.S.-Japan intervention occurred in 1995 which was carried out to address a historically weak U.S. dollar against the yen, which was rapidly rising at the time. The dollar had sunk significantly in 1995, as it also had a historic deficit against the former German mark. This intervention involved U.S. authorities purchasing hundreds of millions of dollars using yen and marks to stabilize the dollar. This resulted in the successful reversal of rapid dollar declines against the yen while minimizing initial volatility responses.

In 1998, the United States led an intervention to support the yen in the wake of the 1997 Asian Financial Crisis. Together, the U.S. and Japan spent an estimated $4 billion USD to purchase yen in foreign exchange markets, which resulted in the yen getting pushed up by more than 5 percent within hours. The intervention was reported to be immediately effective, as the yen appreciated by more than 6 yen per dollar. Prior to the 2026 intervention, the 1998 intervention was the last time the United States and Japan cooperated on a coordinated yen-buying market operation.

Following the Tōhoku earthquake in 2011, the yen underwent a period of quick but disorderly appreciation. The United States Federal Reserve and Treasury departments bought about $1 billion USD against the yen, in a coordinated effort with other G-7 countries to "stabilize the value of the yen". In the first quarter of 2011 (January 1–March 31) the dollar appreciated 2.5 percent against the yen. This was the most recent U.S. yen intervention of any kind until 2026.

=== 21st century yen trends ===
The yen remained relatively stable from the end of the Lost Decades until the 2008 financial crisis, which resulted in rapid appreciation of the yen against the dollar, which continued until 2012. From then until the early 2020s, the yen saw a period of moderate depreciation, which was driven mainly by Japan's ultra-loose monetary policy. However, beginning in 2021 the yen rapidly depreciated against the dollar due to large interest rate differentials with the US, starting with a massive 22-point depreciation between 2021 and 2022 and continuing until mid-2024.

In the summer of 2024, the Bank of Japan started an intervention which included a sudden rate increase and expectations for lower US interest rates. This resulted in the rapid strengthening of the yen against the dollar.

== Intervention ==
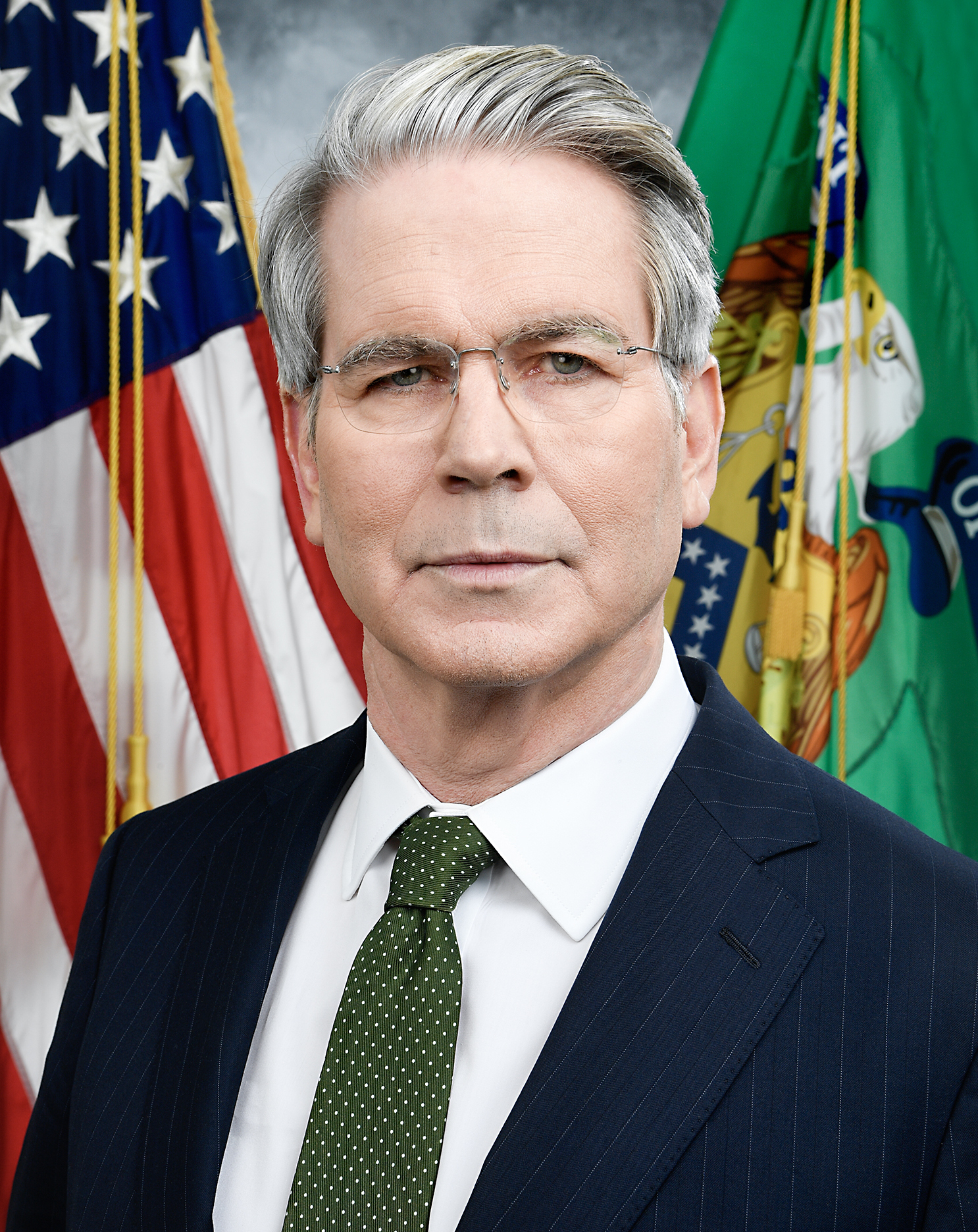
As Secretary of the Treasury, Scott Bessent oversaw the American yen-buying operations.

On Thursday, July 30, the Bank of Japan raised its policy interest rate, but the yen continued to weaken as markets focused on the still-large interest rate gap with the US. The coordinated intervention began the following day, when Japan entered the foreign exchange market to buy yen after the currency weakened to nearly ¥164 per US dollar. Japan was estimated to have bought roughly 8.45 trillion yen, or $52.8 billion USD, with some estimates suggesting as much as $59 billion was bought. This action was purported to have intervened in Japan's foreign exchange market. Simultaneously, the United States Treasury started buying large amounts of yen. Although the exact amount of yen bought by the US Treasury is unknown, Toby Nangle of the Financial Times estimated that a maximum of $26.3 billion USD worth of yen was bought. A photo of Treasury Secretary Scott Bessent's notepad, taken during a cabinet meeting on July 31, read "To Do ... Buy Japanese Yen (JPY) ... $5 – 10 bil [sic]", although no other context was provided. The Treasury, as well as the Federal Reserve Bank of New York, Morgan Stanley and Goldman Sachs, declined to comment.

According to United States President Donald Trump, the US was helping Japan prop up the yen as a sign of friendship and to help the world economy, saying "we're always there for Japan" and that "more than anything else, it was a signal of friendship." It was also noted that the yen experienced a small loss against the dollar shortly after Trump's comments. Satsuki Katayama, Japan's Finance Minister, said that Japan "will not hesitate to conduct further coordinated interventions in the future" and that Tokyo "remains attentive and in close communication with counterparts in the U.S. Treasury." Scott Bessent, Secretary of the United States Department of the Treasury, confirmed that "Friday's coordinated foreign exchange actions countered disorderly yen movements" in a statement similar to the Japanese Finance Ministry's statement, which said that the intervention was carried out "in accordance with the 'Joint Statement of the Japanese and U.S. Finance Ministers'" issued in September 2025, aimed at addressing "the recent excessive volatility and disorderly movements of the yen." Bessent further stressed that the United States government "...strongly support[s] Japan's decisive market and monetary steps to correct the substantial undervaluation of the yen." According to Axios, a Treasury official reported that the action was "a response to the speed and disorderliness of the yen sell-off, and meant to prevent that instability from spreading."

== Market impact ==
In the immediate aftermath of the intervention, the yen jumped by more than 1%, from roughly 164 per dollar towards the end of July to 155.20 per dollar, its strongest since early May 2026. The rate remained relatively stable over the next few days, trading at 156.92 per dollar on Monday, August 3. However, Mark Sobel, a former U.S. Treasury official, said that intervention cannot completely solve the problem of the declining yen, emphasizing that Japan "...needs to address the monetary and fiscal policy concerns." Jennifer Sor of Business Insider noted that American participation means the United States views the yen's weakness as a broader financial stability issue, rather than a purely Japanese problem. According to The Hill, Bessent's motive for participating in the yen intervention was to discourage Japan from selling Treasury funds to back the yen, as Japan is the world's largest holder of U.S. debt.

In the following days and weeks, however, the yen started to weaken, climbing to 159.09 per dollar by August 10, eroding much of the gains made by the intervention. Financial outlets and analysts note that foreign intervention is largely unable to correct long-term problems affecting a currency, with interest rate differentials, fiscal concerns, and higher import costs continuing to weaken the power of the yen. On August 11, the yen dropped again, prompting a selloff. Steven Englander, a market analyst with Standard Chartered Bank, wrote that "...the market may regain courage to short [Japanese yen] again" if it becomes clear that "the Treasury is trying to limit its participation and exposure." Ayako Fujita, an economist at JPMorgan Chase, said that "even if the short-term rate differential narrows somewhat, it should remain sufficiently wide for the time being", while also noting that "carry trades may shrink" as Japanese yields converge in the future. The August 2026 U.S. intervention, as well as any future interventions, may be unable to correct long-term yen trends, as intervention only changes the quantity of yen available, but doesn't eliminate the incentive to borrow or sell yen when U.S. yields remain attractive. The Dutch financial institution ING Group argues that intervention could cap the USD/JPY exchange rate but would struggle to reverse the overall trend of the declining yen without significant changes to Japanese fiscal policy. This includes tackling Japan's massive debt, which exceeded 200% of the country's gross domestic product (GDP) as of early August, as well as the Bank of Japan's hesitancy to increase interest rates despite rising inflation.

Despite the long-term weakening of the yen, the Japanese stock market is overperforming relative to the American and other western markets, with a general increase of 19% in 2026 alone, compared to the S&P Global, which is up 13% in 2026. This has been directly linked to the weakening yen, which benefits Japanese exporters like Toyota, Hitachi, Sony, and Tokyo Electron.

== See also ==
- Japanese yen
- Japan–United States relations
- Aftermath of the 2011 Tōhoku earthquake and tsunami
- United States Department of the Treasury
