= Rystad Energy =

Norwegian energy research company

Rystad Energy AS
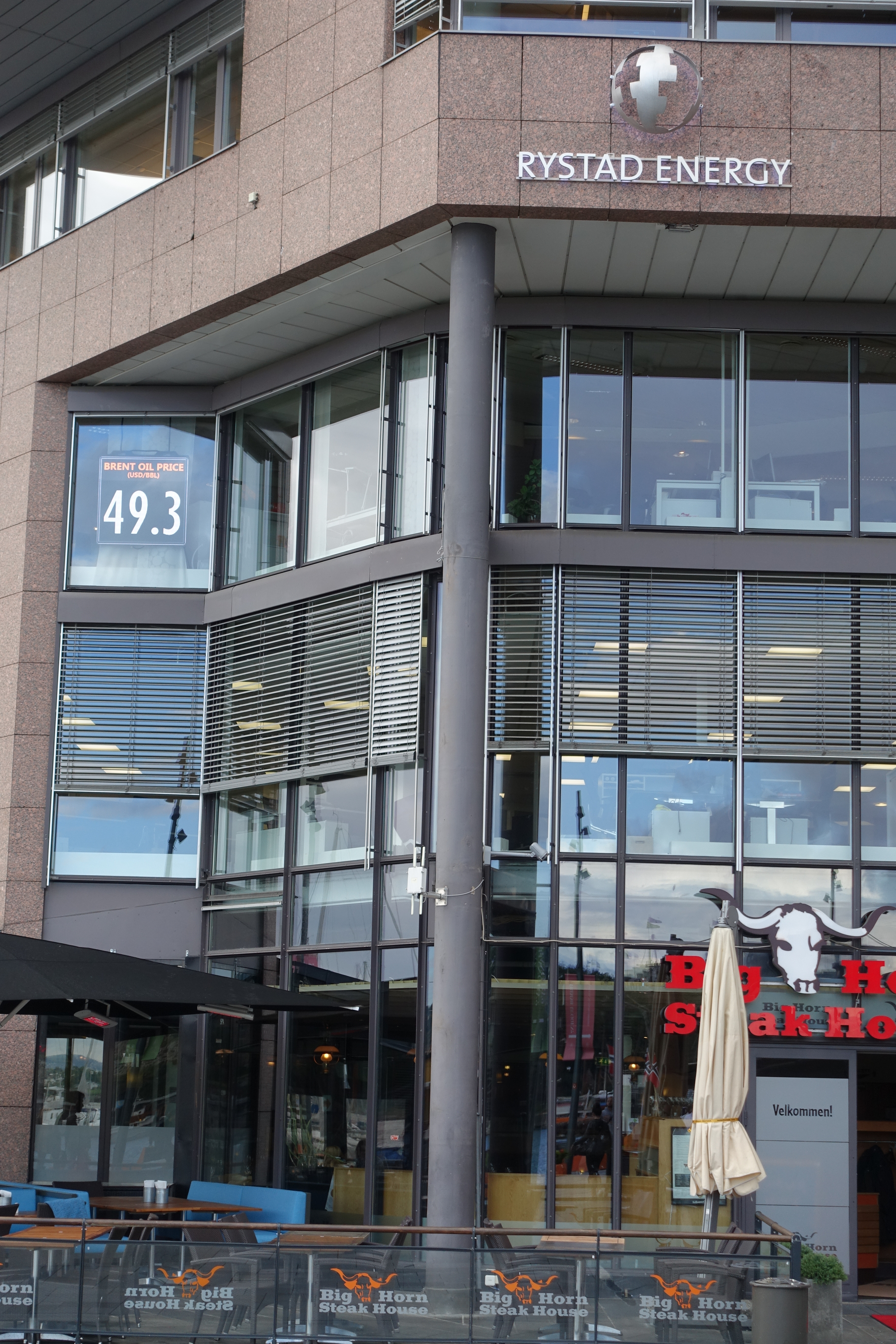
- Rystad Energy's headquarters in Aker Brygge, Oslo
- Company type: Privately held company
- Industry: Energy consultancy
- Founded: 11 November 2004
- Founder: Jarand Rystad
- Net income: US$ 94 million (2023)
- Number of employees: 700 (2024)
- Website: www.rystadenergy.com

Rystad Energy is an independent energy research and business intelligence company headquartered in Oslo, Norway. It is the biggest independent energy consultancy in Norway, and a world-leading analysis company for the energy sector. The company provides mainly oil and gas analyzes, but the share of renewable energy and carbon emission analyzes has increased continuously. Its main market is New York. In addition to oil, oil services and finance companies, its customers include institutions such as OPEC, the International Energy Agency, and the World Bank.

Rystad was founded in 2004 by Jarand Rystad, a Norwegian physicist and earlier consultancy partner for McKinsey. The company specializes in analysis of global energy issues, and has the sole comprehensive database for production data, engineering and financing of all oil and gas fields and deposits in the world. It also has developed similar databases for a wide range of segments within fossil and renewable energy production and related energy equipment and services sectors.

The company is owned by its founder and CEO Jarand Rystad with minority shares owned by senior staff of the company. Jarand Rystad is described by Financial Times as "one of the most cited petroleum analysts in the industry".

Rystad Energy is headquartered in Oslo and has global offices in Houston, Singapore, Dubai, Houston, New York, London, Aberdeen, Moscow, Istanbul, Rio de Janeiro, Singapore, Tokyo, Kuala Lumpur, Beijing, Bangalore, Stavanger, Sydney, and Perth.

In 2019, Rystad's revenue was 331 million Norwegian krone and operating profit was 8.3 million krone.

In April 2021, Rystad predicted that due to COVID-19 and energy transition oil demand will peak at 101.6 million barrels per day (16,150,000 m^{3}/d) in 2026.

It has also said that at least US$3 trillion investment into exploration and development of 313 billion barrels (4.98×10^{10} m^{3}) of new oil resources would be required to meet the oil demand in 2050.
