= Mishra Yantra =

Large 18-century astronomical instruments in India

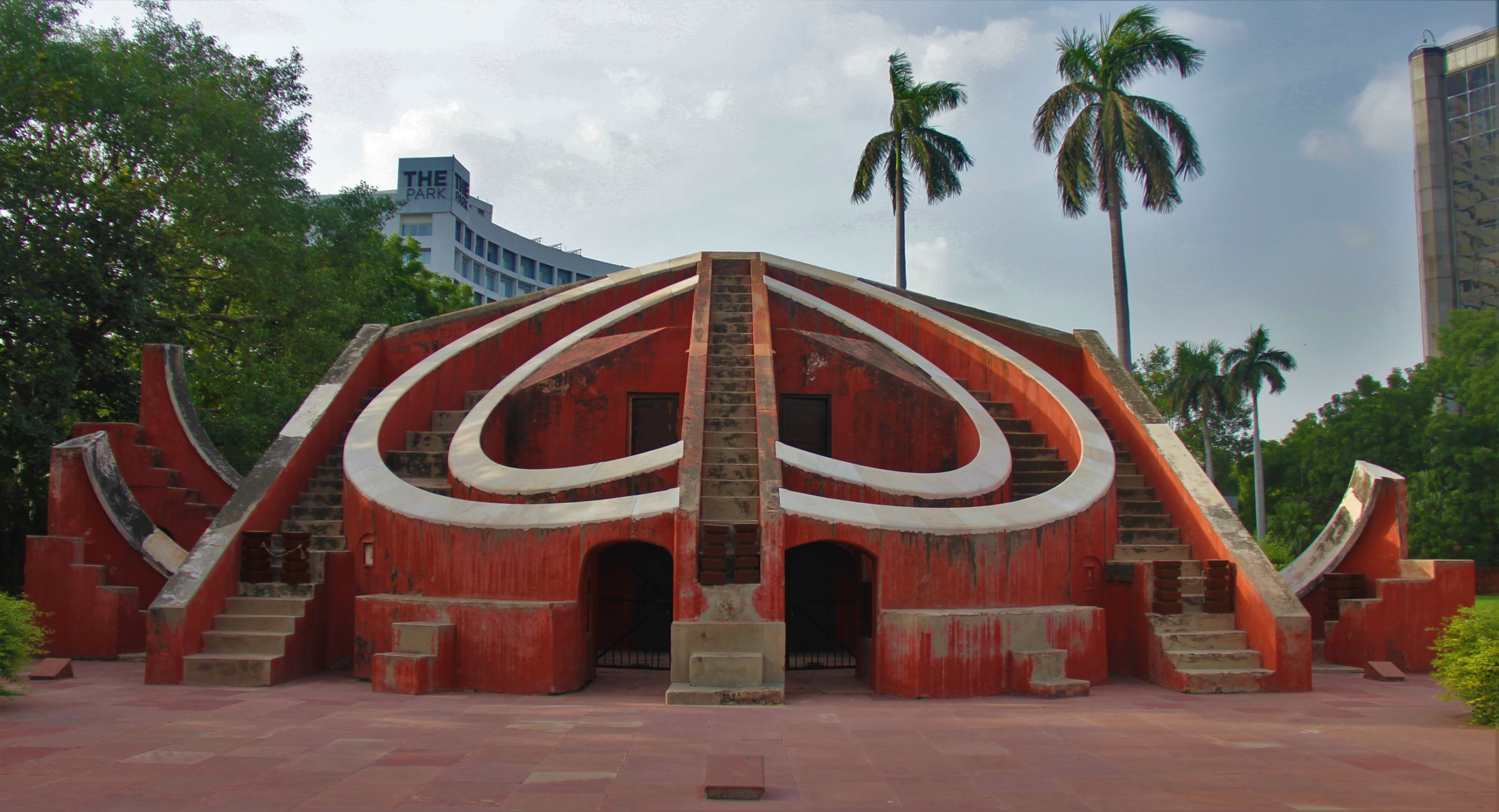
Mishra Yantra at Jantar Mantar, New Delhi

Mishra Yantra (‘mixed instruments’) is a compilation of up to 19 different astronomical instruments. (Note: The four instruments of Jantar Mantar are Samrat Yantra (a large sundial for calculating time), Jay Prakash Yantra (2 concave hemispherical structures, used to ascertain the position of Sun and other heavenly bodies), Ram Yantra (two large cylindrical structures with open top, used to measure the altitude of stars based on the latitude and the longitude on the earth).) gathered in the Jantar Mantar observatories constructed between 1724 and 1730. A total of five Jantar Mantars were constructed across North India in Jaipur, Delhi, Ujjain, Varanasi, and Mathura (this one no longer exists). Each instrument at the Jantar Mantars is architecturally constructed based on mathematical observations, and helps calculate celestial objects and measure time.

== Historical and cultural importance ==
The Mishra (composite) Yantra is composed of five instruments. This Yantra is one of the special instruments in Delhi observatory. It is believed to have been constructed by Maharaja Madho Singh (1751–68), the son of Maharaja Sawai Jai Singh II. The five yantras are the Dakshinottar Bhitti, Samrat Yantra (a smaller version of the large sundial, attached to Mishra Yantra, in two halves), Niyat Chakra, Kark Rashivalaya, and the Western Quadrant.

The Dakshinottar Bhitti was built in the Jaipur, Ujjain, Varanasi and Mathura observatories. It is a modified version of the Portable Meridian Dial present in Greek, Arabic, Hindu and European systems. The Dakshinottar Bhitti of the Mishra Yantra is in the form of a graduated semicircle located on the eastern wall.
