= 1728 =

1728 in various calendars
- Gregorian calendar: 1728; MDCCXXVIII
- Ab urbe condita: 2481
- Armenian calendar: 1177; ԹՎ ՌՃՀԷ
- Assyrian calendar: 6478
- Balinese saka calendar: 1649–1650
- Bengali calendar: 1134–1135
- Berber calendar: 2678
- British Regnal year: 1 Geo. 2 – 2 Geo. 2
- Buddhist calendar: 2272
- Burmese calendar: 1090
- Byzantine calendar: 7236–7237
- Chinese calendar: 丁未年 (Fire Goat); 4425 or 4218 — to — 戊申年 (Earth Monkey); 4426 or 4219
- Coptic calendar: 1444–1445
- Discordian calendar: 2894
- Ethiopian calendar: 1720–1721
- Hebrew calendar: 5488–5489
- Hindu calendars
- Vikram Samvat: 1784–1785
- Shaka Samvat: 1649–1650
- Kali Yuga: 4828–4829
- Holocene calendar: 11728
- Igbo calendar: 728–729
- Iranian calendar: 1106–1107
- Islamic calendar: 1140–1141
- Japanese calendar: Kyōhō 13 (享保１３年)
- Javanese calendar: 1652–1653
- Julian calendar: Gregorian minus 11 days
- Korean calendar: 4061
- Minguo calendar: 184 before ROC 民前184年
- Nanakshahi calendar: 260
- Thai solar calendar: 2270–2271
- Tibetan calendar: མེ་མོ་ལུག་ལོ་ (female Fire-Sheep); 1854 or 1473 or 701 — to — ས་ཕོ་སྤྲེ་ལོ་ (male Earth-Monkey); 1855 or 1474 or 702

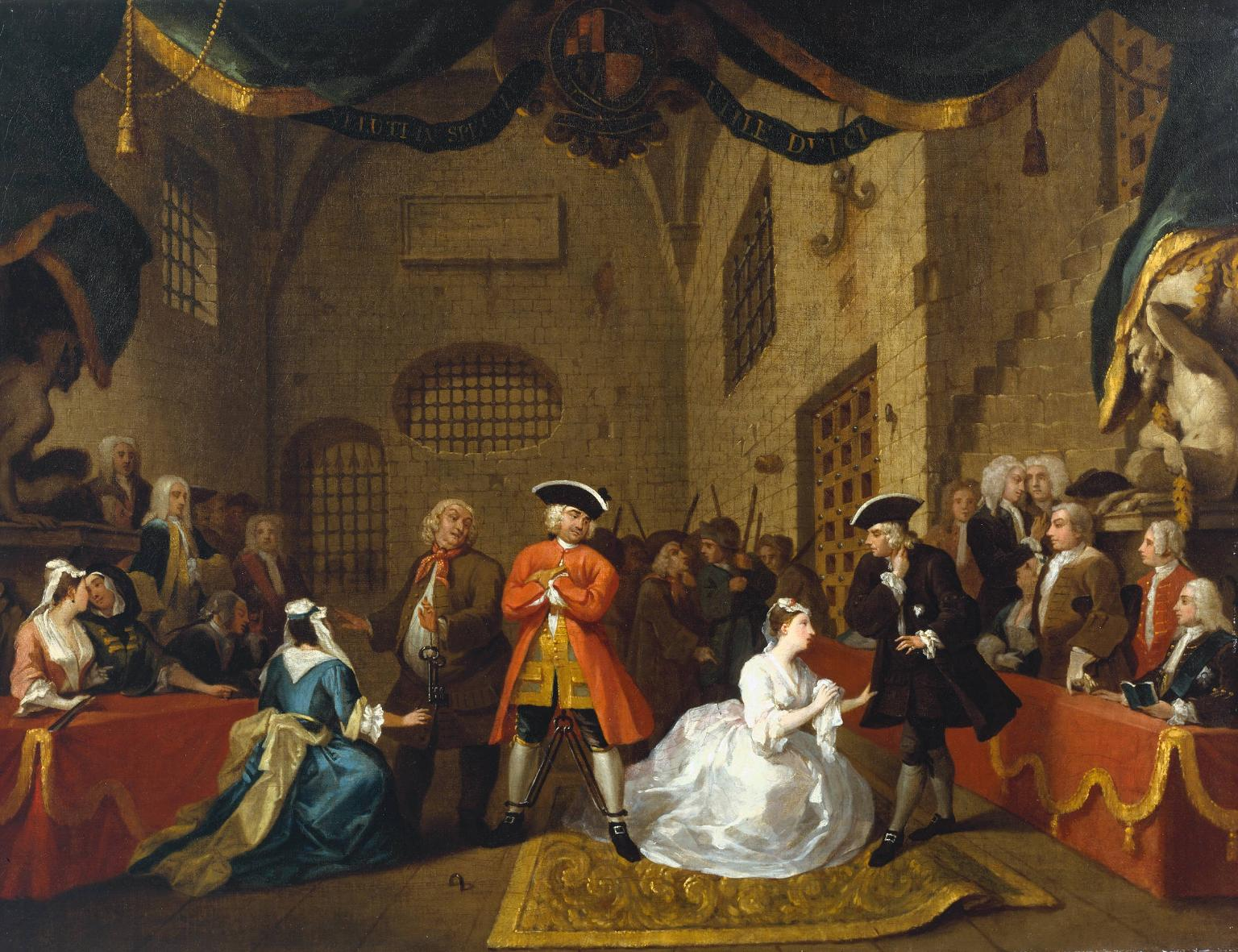
January 29: The Beggar's Opera premieres in London (1731 painting by William Hogarth).

James Bradley calculates the speed of light using stellar aberration.

1728 (MDCCXXVIII) was a leap year starting on Thursday of the Gregorian calendar and a leap year starting on Monday of the Julian calendar, the 1728th year of the Common Era (CE) and Anno Domini (AD) designations, the 728th year of the 2nd millennium, the 28th year of the 18th century, and the 9th year of the 1720s decade. As of the start of 1728, the Gregorian calendar was 11 days ahead of the Julian calendar, which remained in localized use until 1923.

== Events ==
=== January–March ===
- January 5 – The Real y Pontificia Universidad de San Gerónimo de la Habana, the oldest university in Cuba, is founded in Havana.
- January 9 – The coronation of Peter II as the Tsar of the Russian Empire takes place in Moscow.
- January 29 – The Beggar's Opera, the most popular theatrical production of the 18th century, is performed for the first time. The premiere takes place at the Lincoln's Inn Fields Theatre in London. Written by John Gay with music arranged by Johann Christoph Pepusch, the ballad opera is a satire of Italian opera.
- February 28 – Battle of Palkhed: Maratha Peshwa Bajirao I defeats the first Nizam of Hyderabad, Nizam-ul-Mulk.
- March 14 – Jean-Jacques Rousseau leaves Geneva for the first time.

=== April–June ===
- April 14 – Saint Serapion of Algiers, the first Mercedarian (of the Order of the Blessed Virgin Mary of Mercy) is canonized by Pope Benedict XIII.
- April 29 – John Essington, a member of the British House of Commons, is expelled from Commons after a successful petition to have him unseated. Essington, deep in debt, dies in Newgate Prison less than year later.
- April 30 – The 82 survivors of the wreckage of the Dutch East India Company frigate Zeewijk arrive in the new ship that they had built, Sloepie, at their original destination of Batavia in the Dutch East Indies (now Jakarta in Indonesia).
- May 16 – Saint Margaret of Cortona, the patron saint of the falsely accused, homeless people and mental illness sufferers, is canonized.
- May 25 – Pope Gregory VII (Hildebrand of Sovana), who served as pontiff from 1073 to 1085, is canonized as a Roman Catholic saint.
- May 31 – The Royal Bank of Scotland invents the overdraft, allowing Edinburgh merchant William Hogg cash credit (in the amount of £1,000) for his creditors to be paid by the bank until Hogg receives expected revenue to repay the amount owed, plus interest.
- June 14 – The Congress of Soissons opens at the French town of Soissons to negotiate a treaty between Great Britain and Spain. The treaty, which is concluded on November 9, 1729, recognizes the Spanish royal family's rule of parts of Italy, and Britain's possession of Gibraltar and Menorca.
- June 25 – The Treaty of Kyakhta is signed at the border city of Kyakhta, between Russia and China, by representatives of the Tsar Peter II, and the Emperor Yongzheng.

=== July–September ===
- July 14 – The First Kamchatka Expedition, led by Vitus Bering and his crew sail northward on the ship Archangel Gabriel from the Kamchatka Peninsula, through the Bering Strait, and round Cape Dezhnev.
- July 17 – At the age of 8, Prince Teruhito, son of Emperor Nakamikado, is named as the Crown Prince of Japan. Teruhito becomes the Emperor Sakuramachi at age 15, upon his father's death.
- July 18 – After a reign of only four months, Abdalmalik is deposed as Sultan of Morocco by his half-brother Ahmad ad Dahabi, whom he had deposed on March 13. Abdalmalik is later captured and executed on March 2, 1729.
- July 23 – At the conclusion of the Szeged witch trials in the city of the same name in Hungary, six men and six women are burned at the stake on the island of Boszorkány Sziget (Hungarian for "Witch Island").
- August 16 – Because of advancing Arctic ice, the First Kamchatka Expedition turns around after Vitus Bering concludes (inaccurately) that it had reached the easternmost point of Russia and Asia, and fails to spot the coast of Alaska because of the weather.
- August 29 – The City of Nuuk is founded in Greenland, as Fort Godt-Haab, by royal governor Claus Paarss.
- September 15 – Persian physician Mohammad Mehdi ibn Ali Naqi completes Zad al-musafirin, his treatise for travelers to Persia on preservation of their health. He notes the date as a postscript in his manual.
- September 18 – John Deane, a colonial administrator of Britain's British East India Company, returns to Calcutta (Kolkata) after an absence of more than two years, and takes office at Fort William to return to administering the Bengal Presidency, an area now covering the Indian state of West Bengal and the nation of Bangladesh.
- Late Summer – Voltaire ends his exile in England.

=== October–December ===
- October 20–23 – The Copenhagen Fire of 1728 (the largest in the Danish city's history) burns.
- November 25 – In India, the Maratha Empire's army invades the Mughal Empire's Malwa province, crossing the Narmada River. On November 29, the two armies clash at the Battle of Amjhira; the Maratha troops, commanded by General Chimaji Appa, overcome the defenders of Malwa (now part of India's Andhra Pradesh state) and Malwa's Governor Girdhar Bahadur is killed.
- December 25 – William Burnet, the British Governor of the Province of Massachusetts Bay since July 19, is appointed by King George II to be the Governor of the Province of New Hampshire as well, governing both future U.S. states simultaneously until September 7. Up until July, Burnet had been Governor of both New York and New Jersey since 1720.

=== Date unknown ===
- English astronomer James Bradley uses stellar aberration (first observed in 1725) to calculate the speed of light, and observes nutation of the Earth's axis.

== Births ==
- January 9 – Thomas Warton, English poet (d. 1790)
- February 3 – Charles Rainsford, British general (d. 1809)
- February 21 – Emperor Peter III of Russia, husband of Catherine the Great (d. 1762)
- February 25 – John Wood, the Younger, English architect (d. 1782)
- March 28 – Anton Raphael Mengs, German-Bohemian painter (d. 1779)
- April 16 – Joseph Black, Scottish physicist and chemist (d. 1799)
- June 22 – Anna Jabłonowska, Polish magnate and politician (d. 1800)
- August 26 – Johann Heinrich Lambert, Swiss mathematician, physicist and astronomer (d. 1777)
- August 28 – John Stark, American Revolutionary War general (d. 1822)
- September 3 – Matthew Boulton, English manufacturer, lifelong key partner of James Watt (d. 1809)
- September 14 – Mercy Otis Warren, American playwright (d. 1814)
- October 5 – Chevalière d'Éon, French diplomat, spy, soldier and trans individual (d. 1810)
- October 7 – Caesar Rodney, American lawyer and signer of the Declaration of Independence (d. 1784)

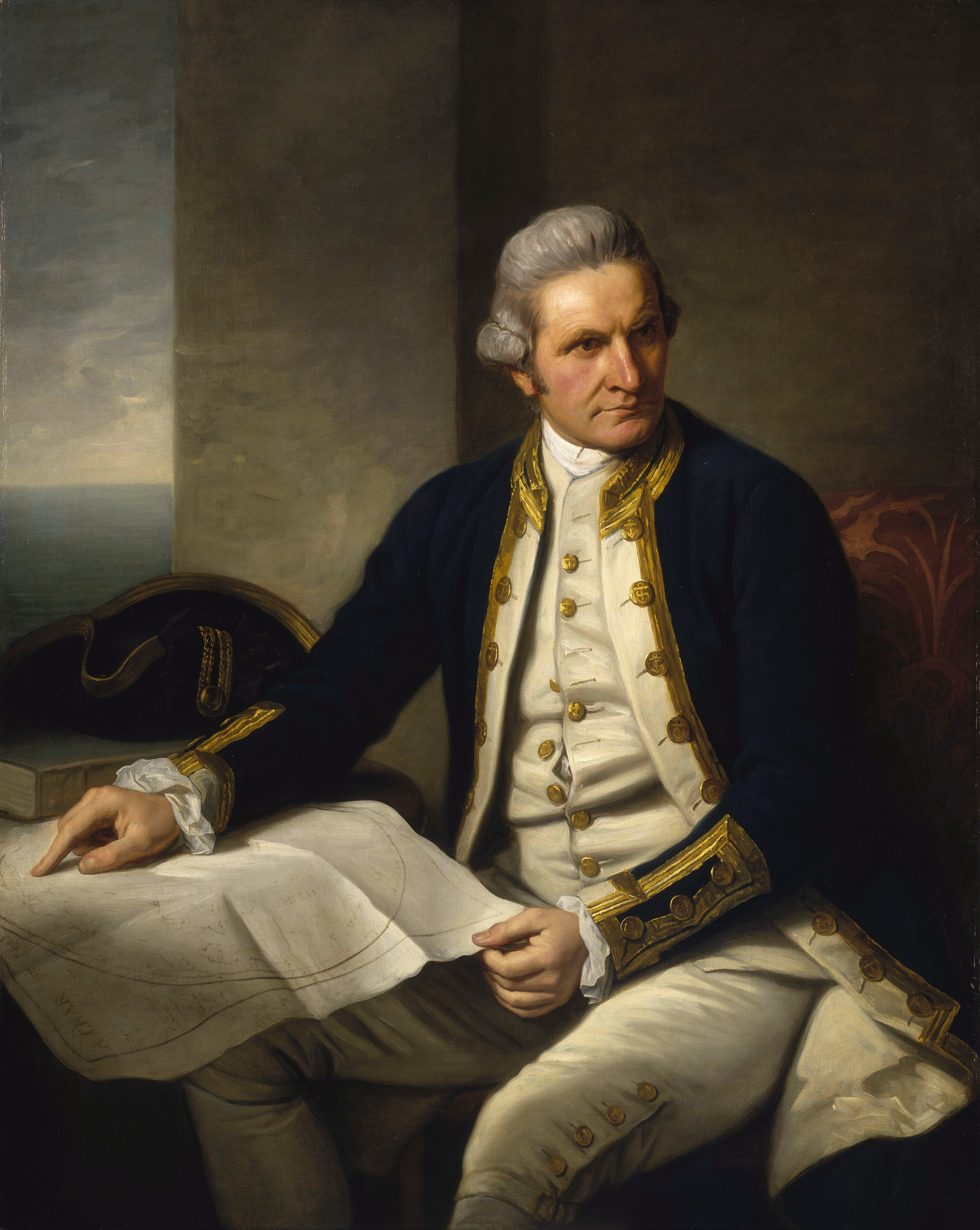
James Cook

- October 27 – James Cook, British naval commander and explorer (d. 1779)
- November 10 – Oliver Goldsmith, Irish writer (d. 1774)
- December 28 – Justus Claproth, German jurist, inventor of the de-inking process of recycled paper (d. 1805)
- date unknown
  - Josefa Ordóñez, Spanish–Mexican actress, courtesan (est. year of birth)
  - James Armstrong, American politician and Major of the Continental Army (d. 1800) (est. year of birth)
- Juan Albano Pereira Márquez godfather and tutor of Bernardo O'Higgins.

== Deaths ==
- January 26 – Paolo de Matteis, Italian painter (b. 1662)
- February 12 – Agostino Steffani, Italian diplomat, composer (b. 1654)

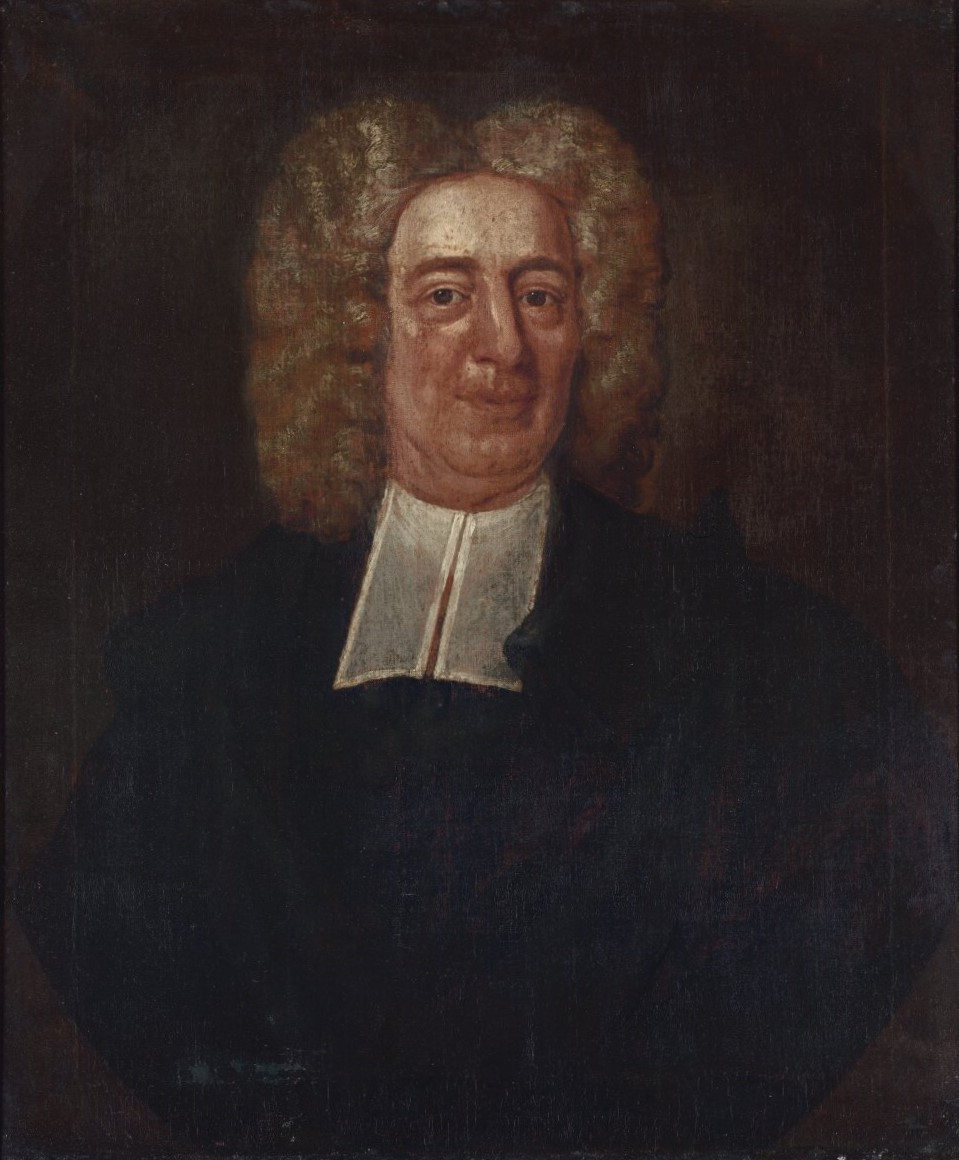
Cotton Mather

- February 13 – Cotton Mather, New England Puritan minister (b. 1663)
- February 16
  - Maria Aurora von Königsmarck, Swedish noblewoman of Brandenburg extraction (b. 1662)
  - Heinrich of Saxe-Weissenfels, Count of Barby, German prince (b. 1657)
- February 25 – Alexander zu Dohna-Schlobitten, German general (b. 1661)
- March 4 – Grand Duchess Anna Petrovna of Russia, eldest daughter of Peter the Great (b. 1708)
- March 7 – Frederick Louis, Duke of Schleswig-Holstein-Sonderburg-Beck (b. 1653)
- March 18 – George Stanhope, Dean of Canterbury (b. 1660)
- March 20 – Camille d'Hostun, duc de Tallard, Marshal of France (b. 1652)
- May 26 – William Cheyne, 2nd Viscount Newhaven, English politician (b. 1657)
- April 3 – James Anderson, Scottish historian (b. 1662)
- April 10 – Nicodemus Tessin the Younger, Swedish architect (b. 1654)
- April 21 – Filippo Antonio Gualterio, Italian Catholic cardinal (b. 1660)
- April 23 – Tomás de Torrejón y Velasco, Spanish composer, musician and organist (b. 1644)
- May 7 – Rose Venerini, Italian saint, educational pioneer (b. 1656)
- May 14 – Louise Marie d'Orléans, Mademoiselle, French princess (b. 1726)
- May 23 – William Delaune, English academic administrator and clergyman (b. 1659)
- June 6 – David Leslie, 3rd Earl of Leven, British politician (b. 1660)
- June 17 – Matthieu Petit-Didier, French Benedictine theologian (b. 1659)
- June 30 – Otto Friedrich von der Groeben, Prussian traveller, soldier and author (b. 1657)
- July 21 – Nathaniel Gould, English politician (b. 1661)
- August 3 – Abraham de Peyster, United States politician (b. 1657)
- August 7 – Jacques L'enfant, French Protestant pastor (b. 1661)
- August 11 – William Sherard, English botanist (b. 1659)
- August 15 – Marin Marais, French viol player and composer (b. 1656)
- August 26
  - William Ernest, Duke of Saxe-Weimar (b. 1662)
  - Anne Marie d'Orléans, Queen consort of Sicily and Sardinia (b. 1669)
- September 23 – Christian Thomasius, German jurist (b. 1655)
- September 24 – Frederik Krag, Danish nobleman and senior civil servant (b. 1655)
- October 1 – Robert Livingston the Elder, New York colonial official (b. 1654)
- October 15 – Bernard de la Monnoye, French lawyer (b. 1641)
- November 10 – Fyodor Apraksin, Russian admiral (b. 1661)
- November 15 – Élie Benoist, French Protestant minister (b. 1640)
- November 19 – Leopold, Prince of Anhalt-Köthen, German prince (b. 1694)
- November 22
  - Grand Duchess Natalya Alexeyevna of Russia (1714–1728), Russian grand duchess (b. 1714)
  - Joseph Boyse, Presbyterian minister (b. 1660)
- December 4 – Richard Ferrier, English politician (born c. 1671)
- December 8 – Camillo Rusconi, Italian artist (b. 1658)
- December 28 – Thomas Johnson, English politician (b. 1664)
- date unknown
  - Giovanni Barbara, Maltese architect and military engineer (b. 1642)
  - Dionysius Andreas Freher, German mystic (b. 1649)
  - Stokkseyrar-Dísa, Icelandic Galdrmistress (b. 1668)
  - Serfoji I, third Raja of the Bhonsle Dynasty (b. 1675)
  - Maria Guyomar de Pinha, Siamese cook (b. 1664)
