= Jantar Mantar, Ujjain =

Jantar Mantar
- Vedh Shala
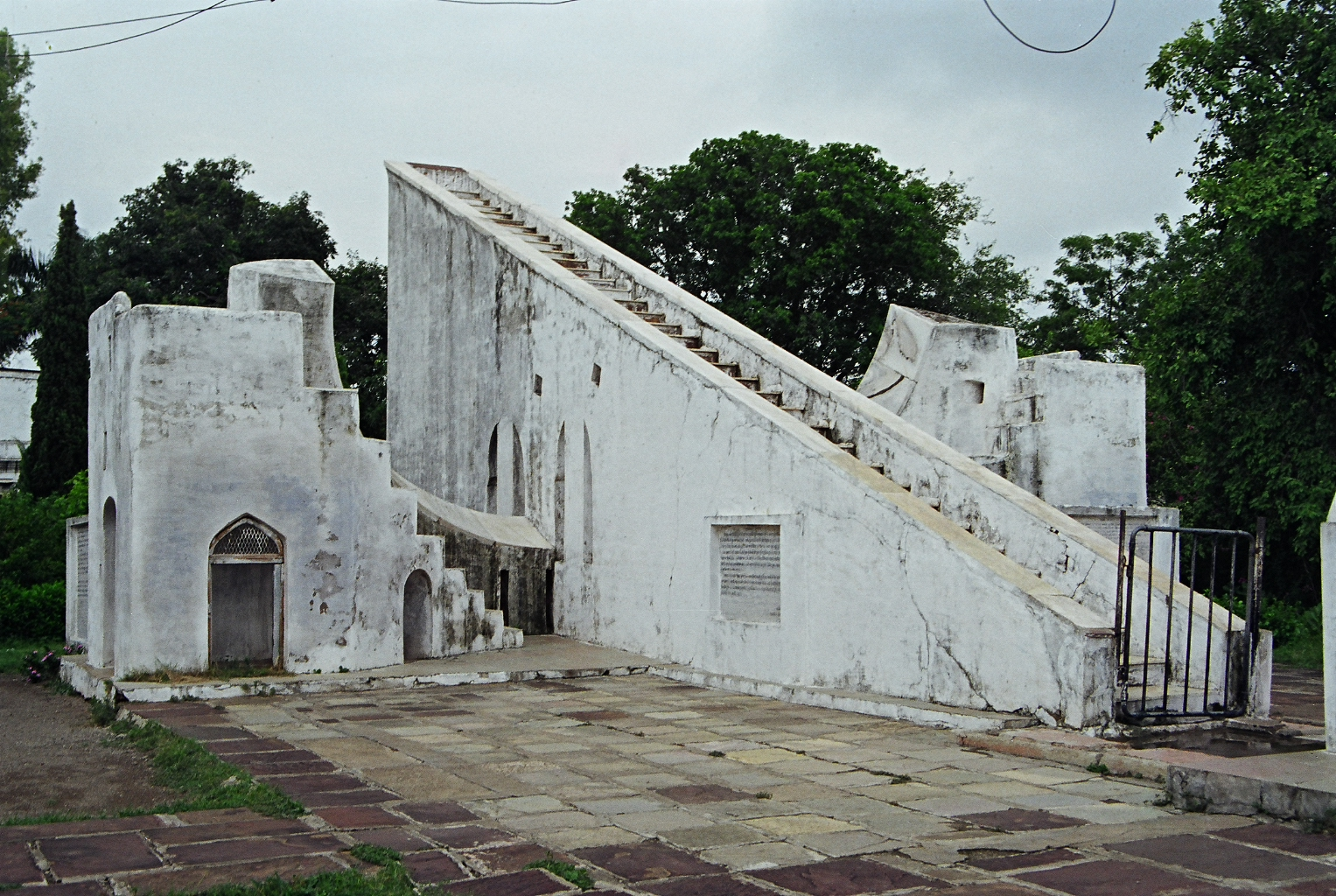
- Sun Dial at Vedh Shala
- Interactive map of Jantar Mantar
- 23°10′17″N 75°45′59″E
- Type: Observatory
- Location: Ujjain, Madhya Pradesh, India
- Nearest city: Ujjain, Indore

History
- Founder: Maharaja Jai Singh II
- Built: 1725
- Original use: Determine Eclipses
- Rebuilt: 1974

Site notes
- Elevation: 75.6 m (248 ft)
- Area: Malwa
- Restored: 1982
- Owner: Ujjain Municipal Corporation

Jantar Mantar or Vedh Shala in New Ujjain is an observatory designed to be used with the naked eye. It is one of five Jantar Mantar in India. It was built by Maharaja Jai Singh II in 1725 when he was governor of Ujjain and consists of 13 architectural astronomy instruments.

Vedh Shala was constructed with the aim of measuring local time, altitude (of the place) and also to measure declination of the Sun, stars and planets and to determine eclipses. Motion, speed and properties of stars and planets were also recorded using several special instruments.

Jai Singh II was also an astronomer and had deep interest in science and astronomy. In early 18th century, he sent his scholars to several countries to study design, construction and technology of the observatories and also the prevalent technology. The scholars returned with their observations and many manuals on astronomy. Subsequently between 1724 and 1737, Jai Singh II had five observatories constructed in Jaipur, Mathura, New Delhi, Ujjain and in Varanasi.

Geographically, the city of Ujjain is considered the Greenwich of India because the first meridian of longitude in the Indian tradition passes through it. Moreover, it sits on the tropic of cancer.
