= Jagannatha Samrat =

Indian astronomer and mathematician (1652–1744)

Paṇḍita Jagannātha Samrāṭ (1652–1744) was an Indian astronomer and mathematician who served in the court of Jai Singh II of Amber, and was also his guru.

Jagannātha, whose father's name was Gaṇeśa, and grandfather's Viṭṭhala was from a Vedic family originally from Maharashtra.

At the suggestion of Jai Singh, he learned Arabic and Persian, in order to study Islamic astronomy. Having become proficient in these languages, he translated texts in these languages into Sanskrit. These translations include:

- Rekhā-gaṇita, a translation of Euclid's Elements made from Nasir al-Din al-Tusi's Arabic recension of the same. For this work, he had to coin more than a hundred Sanskrit mathematical terms
- Siddhānta-sāra-kaustubha, a translation of Ptolemy's Almagest from Nasir al-Din al-Tusi's Arabic version

His original works include:

- ‍Siddhānta-samrāṭ, which describes astronomical instruments, their design and construction, and observations. It also describes the use of these observations in correcting parameters and preparing almanacs. It mentions how J‌ai Singh, who earlier used astronomical instruments (such as the astrolabe) made of metal, later switched to huge outdoor observatories (such as the Jantar Mantar), as they were more precise; also they were made of stone and mortar rather than brick, to diminish the effects of wear-and-tear and climate.
- Yantra-prakāra, which describes astronomical instruments, measurements, computations, etc. in more detail, and also observations made by him.

Jagannātha held that when theory and observation differed, observation was the true pramāṇa and overruled theory. While he used and described a number of astronomical instruments, telescopes were not one of them.
