= Girdhar Bahadur =

- Subahdar

Subahdar of Illahabad
- Reign: 1719 – ?
- Predecessor: Chhabile Ram

Subahdar of Oudh
- Reign: ? – 1722
- Predecessor: Mir Mushrif
- Successor: Saadat Ali Khan I

Subahdar of Malwa
- Reign: 30 August 1722 – 15 May 1723
- Predecessor: Nizam-ul-Mulk, Asaf Jah I
- Successor: Azim-ullah Khan

Subahdar of Malwa
- Reign: 2 June 1725 – 29 November 1728
- Predecessor: Azim-ullah Khan
- Successor: Jai Singh II
- Died: 29 November 1728; Amjhera, Malwa Subah, Mughal Empire
- Father: Daya Ram
- Religion: Hinduism

Girdhar Bahadur (also Giridhar) was a noble, serving as subahdar of several provinces of the Mughal Empire at various times. He was noted for his military service in Malwa against the Marathas, which led to his death at the Battle of Amjhera.

== Biography ==
He was a Nagar Brahmin. On 29 November 1716, he was appointed the faujdar of Benares and Chunar, as well as the qiladar of the Chunar Fort. After being unable to quell rebellions in the region his uncle Chhabila Ram intervened.

Mughal Emperor Muhammad Shah appointed Girdhar Bahadur the Subahdar of Malwa on 30 August 1722. Maratha incursions into the territory continued, and Nizam-ul-Mulk, Asaf Jah I of Hyderabad, exercising significant power in the Mughal government, gave Girdhar Bahadur's Subahdari to his own second cousin Azim-ullah Khan on 15 May 1723. However, the continuing rise in power of the Nizam after his defeat of Mubariz Khan in Golconda threatened the Mughal Emperor, who re-appointed Girdhar Bahadur to the Subahdari on 2 June 1725.

Maratha incursions made headway into Malwa and the Peshwa established the collection of taxes in Amjhera, Jhabua, Dhar, and Indore by 1725. Military forces pushed as far as Mandsaur but a counteroffensive by Daya Bahadur, the military commander in Malwa under Girdhar, repelled Maratha incursions and regained lost revenue in 1726. Continuing incursions in the next year led Girdhar Bahadur to lead a counteroffensive, encamping in Mandsaur in the rainy season of 1728. Girdhar Bahadur died in the Battle of Amjhera fighting against the Marathas on 29 November 1728, hit by musket shot while leading an elephant into battle. His cousin Daya Bahadur was captured and died in Amjhera itself. His nephew Bhawani Ram became the Subahdar for a brief period afterwards.
