= Jantar Mantar, New Delhi =

Historical place in New Delhi

- Mishra Yantra
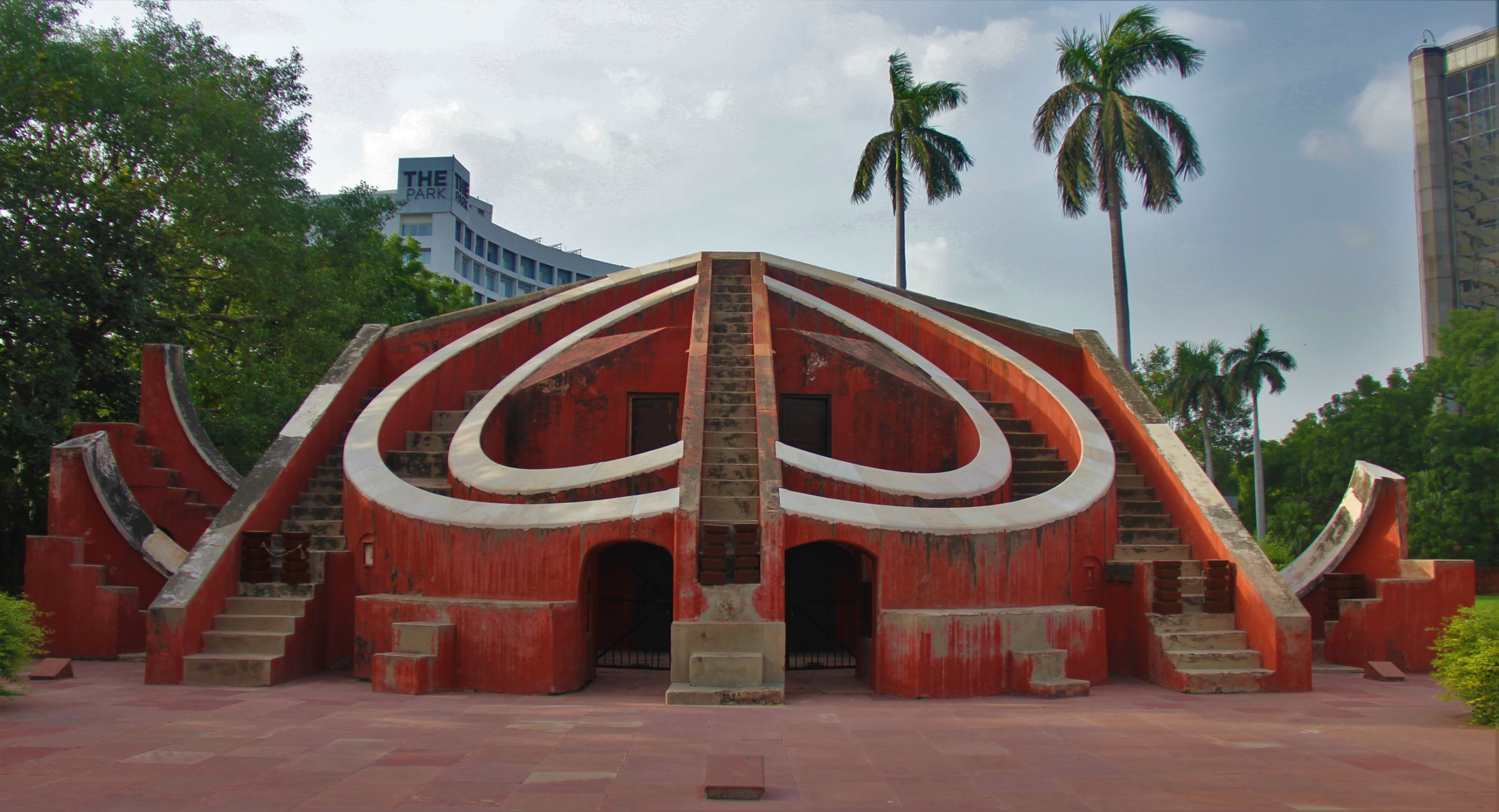
- Mishra Yantra at Jantar Mantar

- Location within Delhi
- 28°37′38″N 77°12′59″E
- Type: Observatory
- Location: New Delhi, India
- Nearest city: New Delhi

History
- Founder: Sawai Jai Singh
- Built: 1724; 302 years ago

Site notes
- Elevation: 723 feet (220 m)
- Website: jantarmantar.org

The Jantar Mantar in New Delhi is an observatory, designed to be used with the naked eye. It is one of five Jantar Mantars in India. "Jantar Mantar" means 'instruments for measuring the harmony of the heavens'. It consists of 13 architectural astronomical instruments.

The site is one of five built by Sawai Jai Singh of Jaipur, from 1723 onwards, revising the calendar and astronomical tables. Jai Singh, born in 1688 into a royal Rajput family that ruled the regional kingdom, was born into an era of education that maintained a keen interest in astronomy. There is a plaque fixed on one of the structures in the Jantar Mantar observatory in New Delhi that was placed there in 1910 mistakenly dating the construction of the complex to the year 1710. Later research, though, suggests 1724 as the actual year of construction. It is 723 feet (220 m) above sea level.

The primary purpose of the observatory was to compile astronomical tables, and to predict the times and movements of the Sun, Moon and planets. Some of these purposes nowadays would be classified as astronomy.

Completed in 1724, the Delhi Jantar Mantar had decayed considerably by the time of the 1857 uprising. The Ram Yantra, the Samrat Yantra, the Jai Prakash Yantra and the Misra Yantra are the distinct instruments of Jantar Mantar. The most famous of these structures, the Jaipur, had also deteriorated by the end of the nineteenth century until in 1901 when Maharaja Ram Singh set out to restore the instrument.

== History ==
Jantar Mantar is located in New Delhi and built by Maharaja Jai Singh II of Jaipur in the year 1724. The maharaja built five observatories during his rule in the 18th century. Among these five, the one in Delhi was the first to be built. The other four observatories are located in Ujjain, Mathura, Varanasi, and Jaipur.

The objective behind the construction of these observatories was to assemble astronomical data and to accurately predict the movement of the planets, Moon, Sun, etc. in the Solar System. It was a one of a kind in its time when it was built. By the year 1867, when India was under the British Raj, the observatory had undergone considerable decay.

== Purpose of individual structures ==
There are four distinct instruments within the observatory of Jantar Mantar in New Delhi: the Samrat Yantra, the Jayaprakash, Rama Yantra and the Mishra Yantra.

- Samrat Yantra: The Samrat Yantra, or Supreme Instrument, is a giant triangle that is basically an equal hour sundial. It is 70 feet high, 114 feet long at the base, and 10 feet thick. It has a 128-foot ih-long (39 m) hypotenuse that is parallel to the Earth's axis and points toward the North Pole. On either side of the triangle is a quadrant with graduations indicating hours, minutes, and seconds. At the time of the Samrat Yantra's construction, sundials already existed, but the Samrat Yantra turned the basic hug sundial into a precision tool for measuring declination and other related coordinates of various heavenly bodies. The Vrihat Samrat Yantra can calculate the local time at an accuracy of up to two seconds and is considered the world's largest sundial.
- Jaya Prakash Yantra: The Jaya Prakash consists of hollowed out hemispheres with markings on their concave surfaces. Crosswires were stretched between points on their rim. From inside the Ram, an observer could align the position of a star with various markings or a window's edge. This is one of the most versatile and complex instruments that can give the coordinates of celestial objects in multiple systems- the Azimuthal-altitude system and the Equatorial coordinate system. This allowed for the easy conversation of the popular celestial system.
- Rama Yantra: Two large cylindrical structures with open top, used to measure the altitude of stars based on the latitude and the longitude on the Earth.
- Misra Yantra: The Misra Yantra (Literally mixed instrument) is a composition of 5 instruments designed as a tool to determine the shortest and longest days of the year. It could also be used to indicate the exact moment of noon in various cities and locations regardless of their distance from Delhi. The Misra yantra was able to indicate when it was noon in various cities all over the world and was the only structure in the observatory not invented by Jai Singh II.
- Shasthansa Yantra: Using a pinhole camera mechanism, it has been built within the towers that support the quadrant scales. It is used to measure specific measurements of the Sun such as the zenith distance, declination, and diameter of the Sun.
- Kapala Yantra: Built on the same principle as the jai Prakash, the instrument is used more as a demonstration to indicate the transformation of one coordinate system to another. Not used for active celestial observation.
- Rasivalya Yantra: Twelve of these structures were built, each referring to the zodiacal constellations by measuring the latitude and longitude of a celestial object at the very moment the celestial object crosses the meridian.

== Other observatories ==
Between 1727 and 1734 Jai Singh II built five similar observatories in west-central India, all known by the name Jantar Mantar. They are located at

- Jaipur,
- Ujjain,
- Mathura, and
- Varanasi.

While the purpose of the Jantar Mantar was astronomy and astrology (Jyotish), they are also a major tourist attraction and a significant monument of the history of astronomy.

== Gallery ==
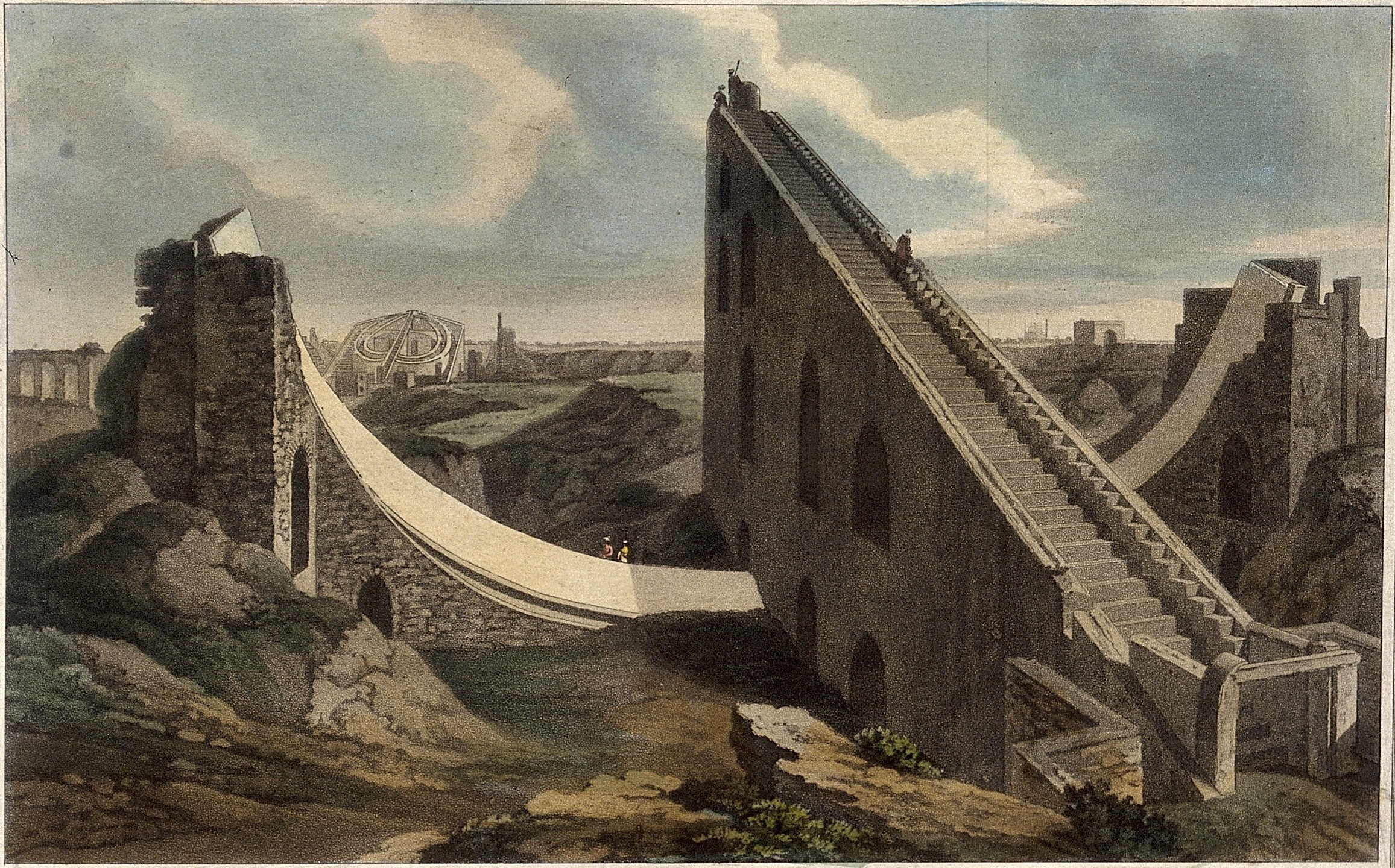
The Jantar Mantar, ca. 1790 by Thomas Daniell

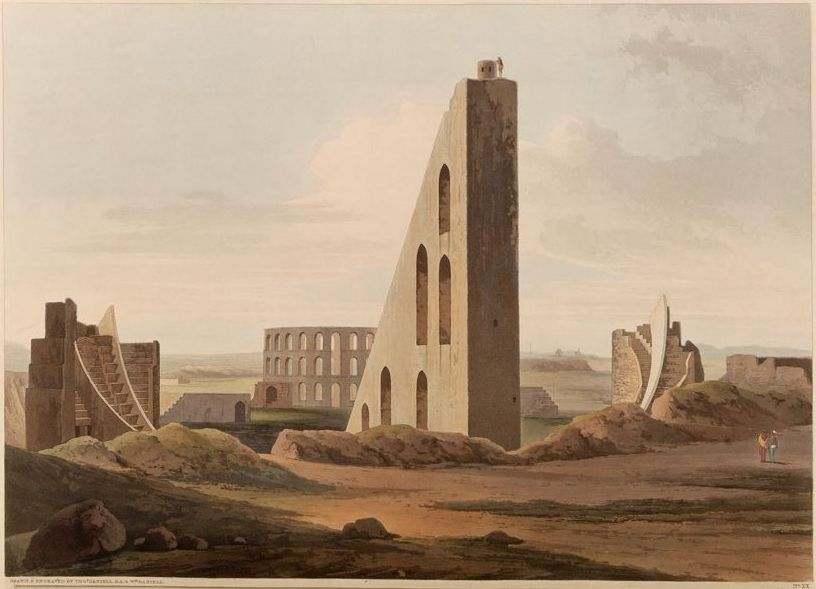
Another view by Thomas Daniell

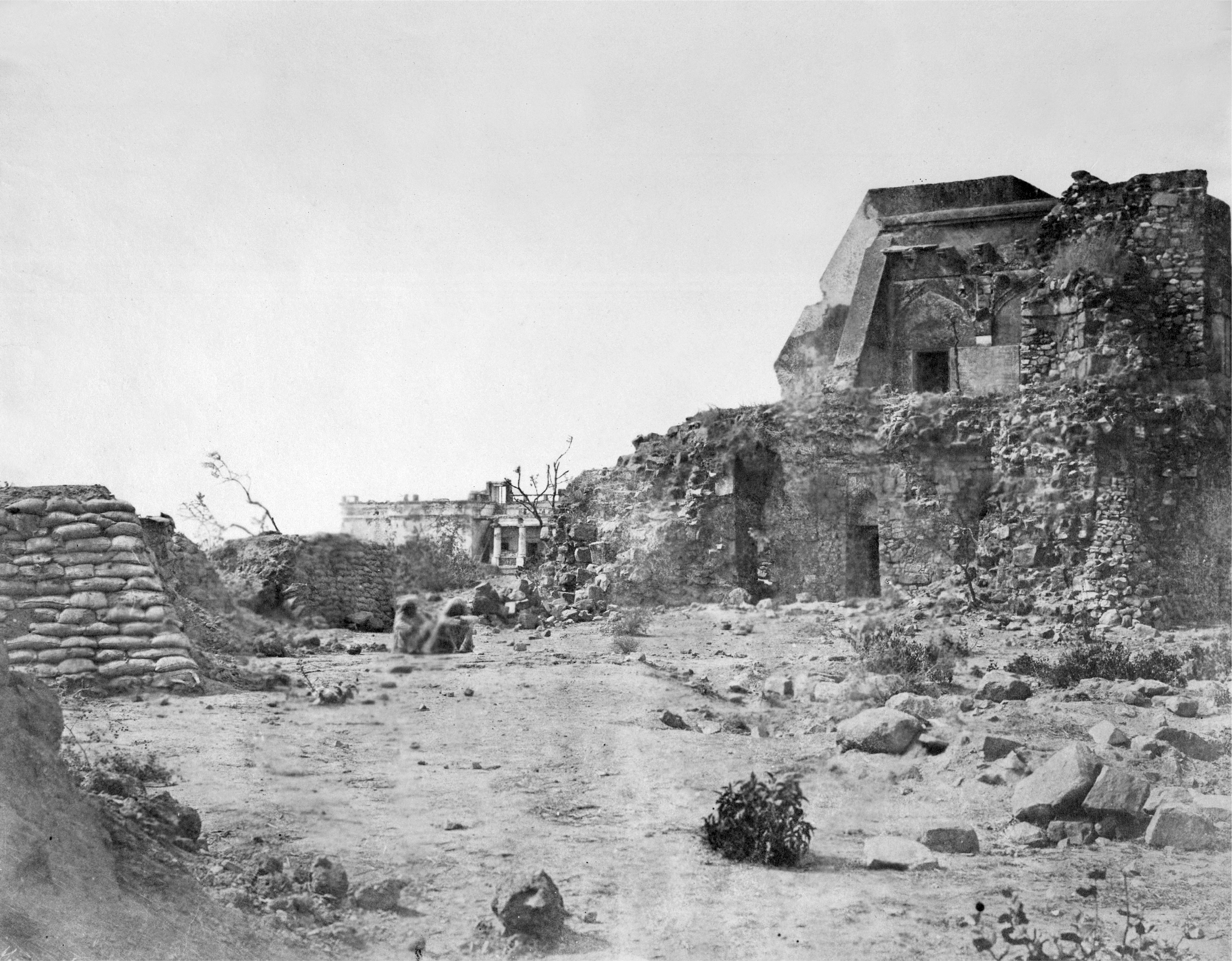
The Jantar Mantar in 1858, damaged by fighting during the Indian Rebellion of 1857

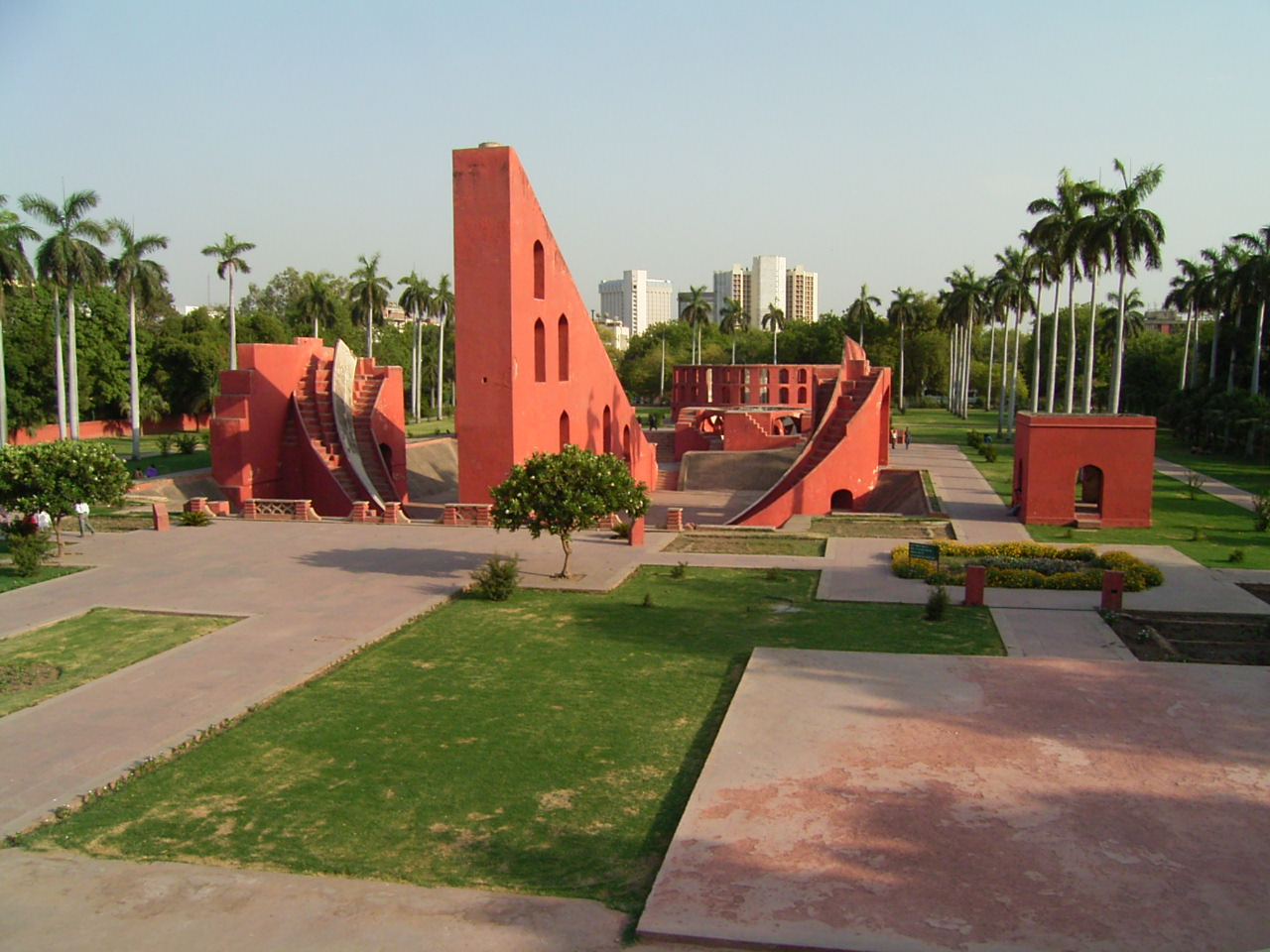
Jantar Mantar, New Delhi

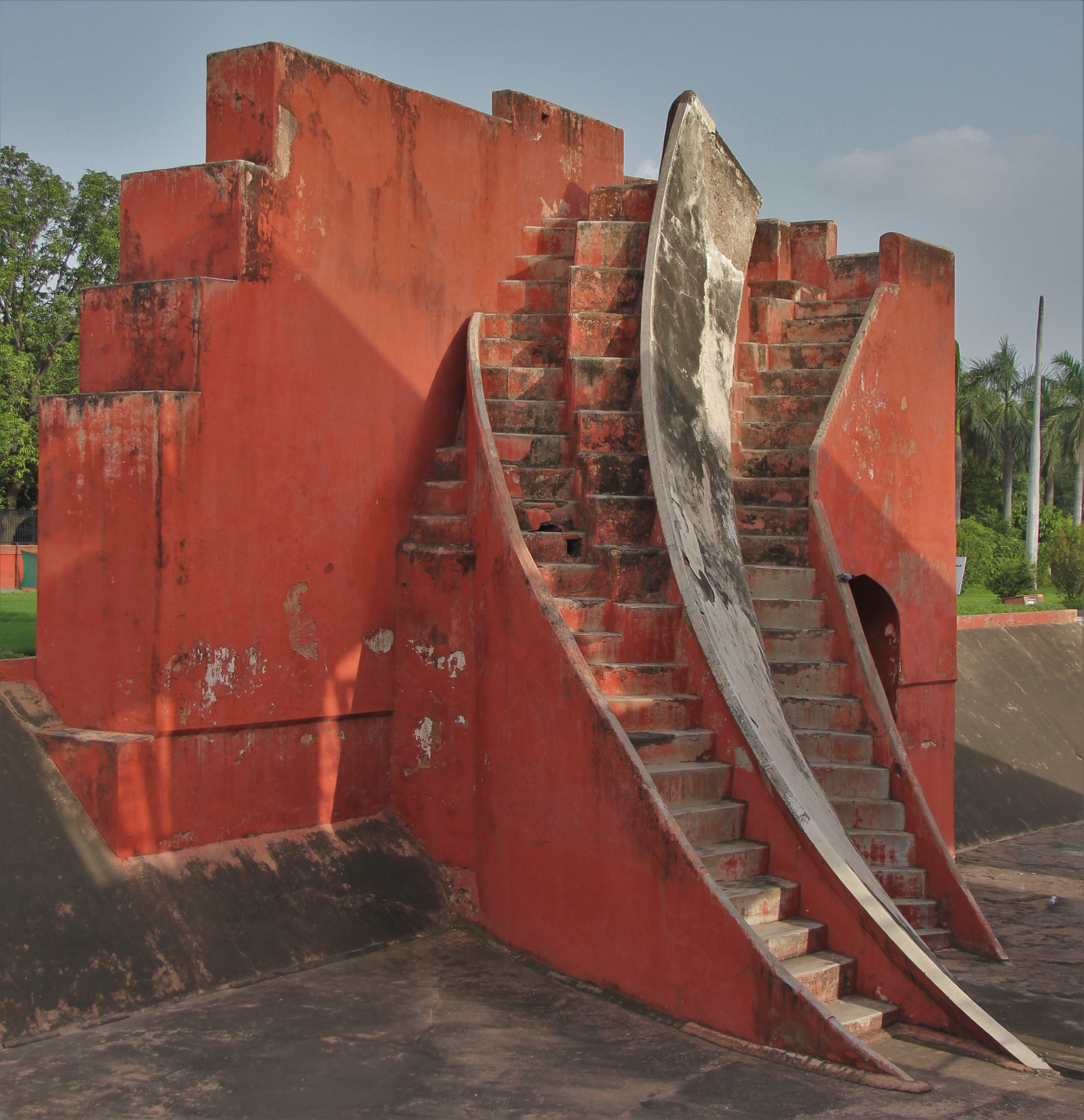
West tower of Samrat Yantra

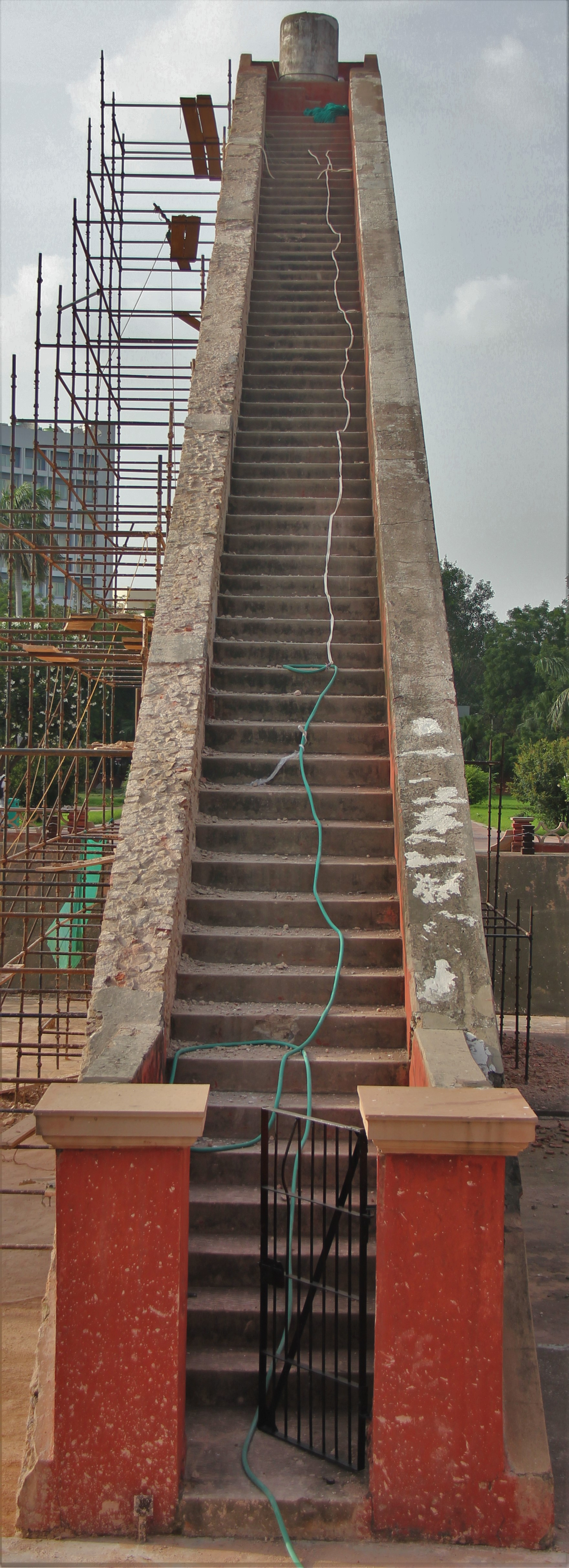
Centre tower of Samrat Yantra

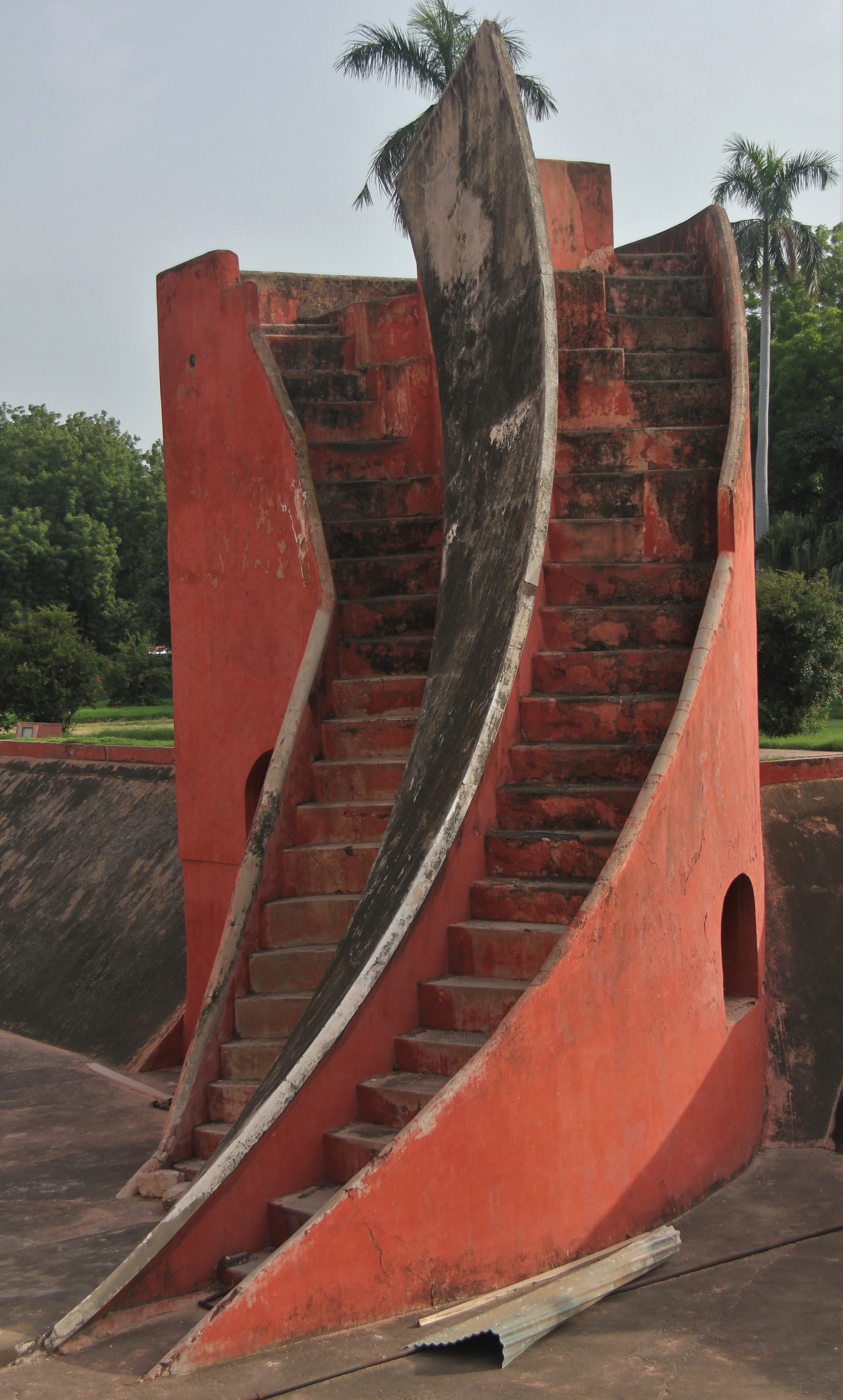
East tower of Samrat Yantra

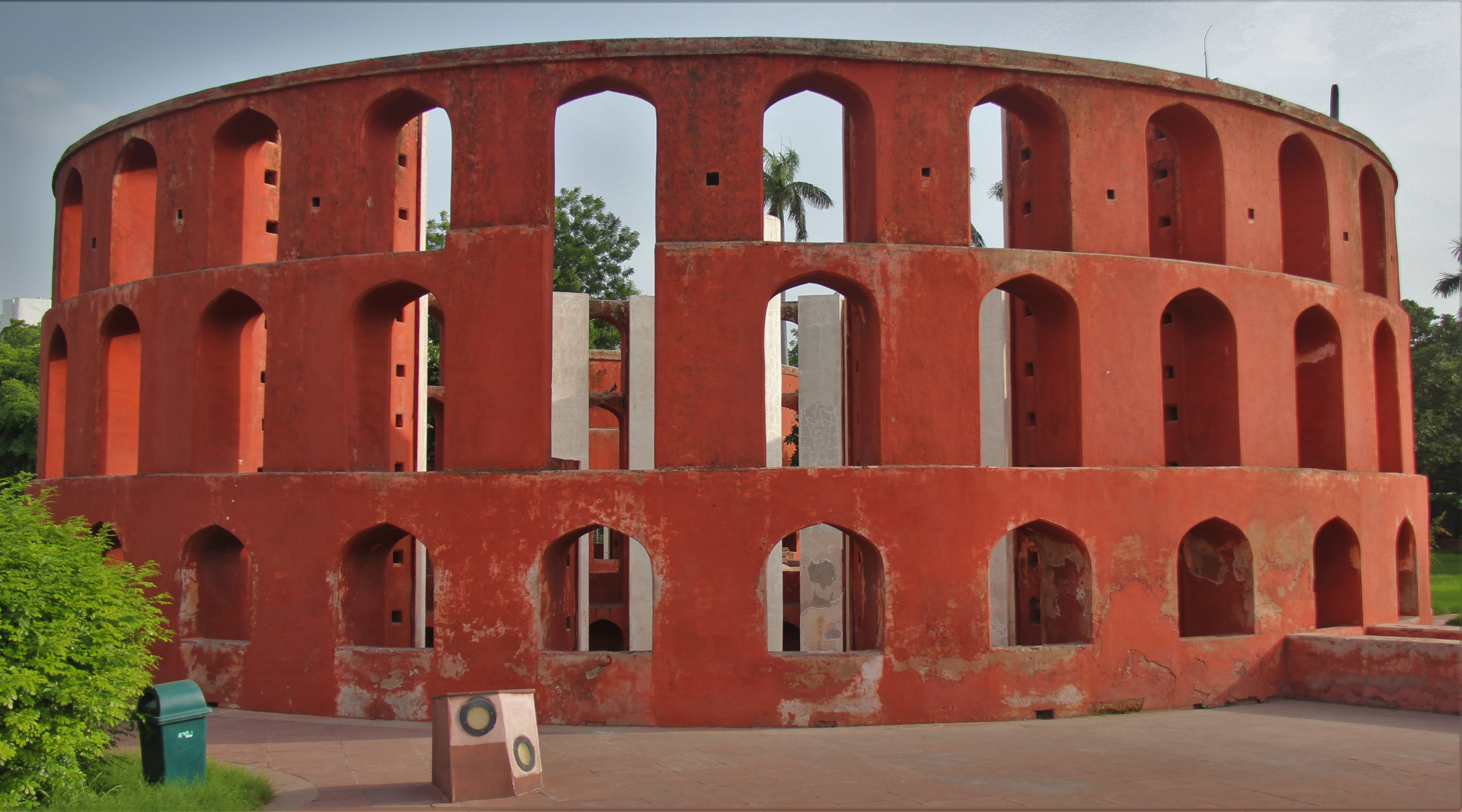
Rama Yantra (north of the two Rama Yantra)

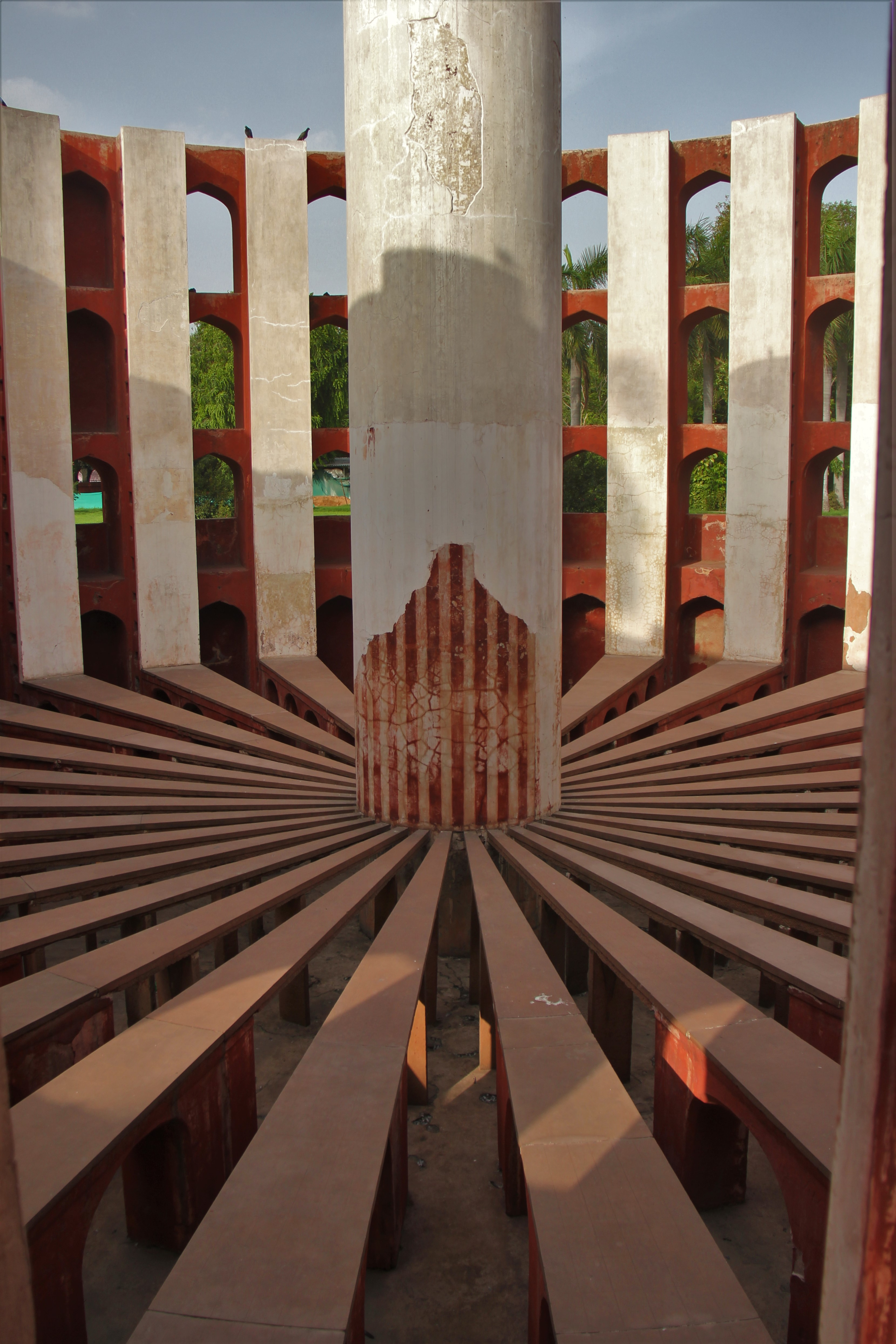
Inside view of Rama Yantra 2 of Jantar Mantar

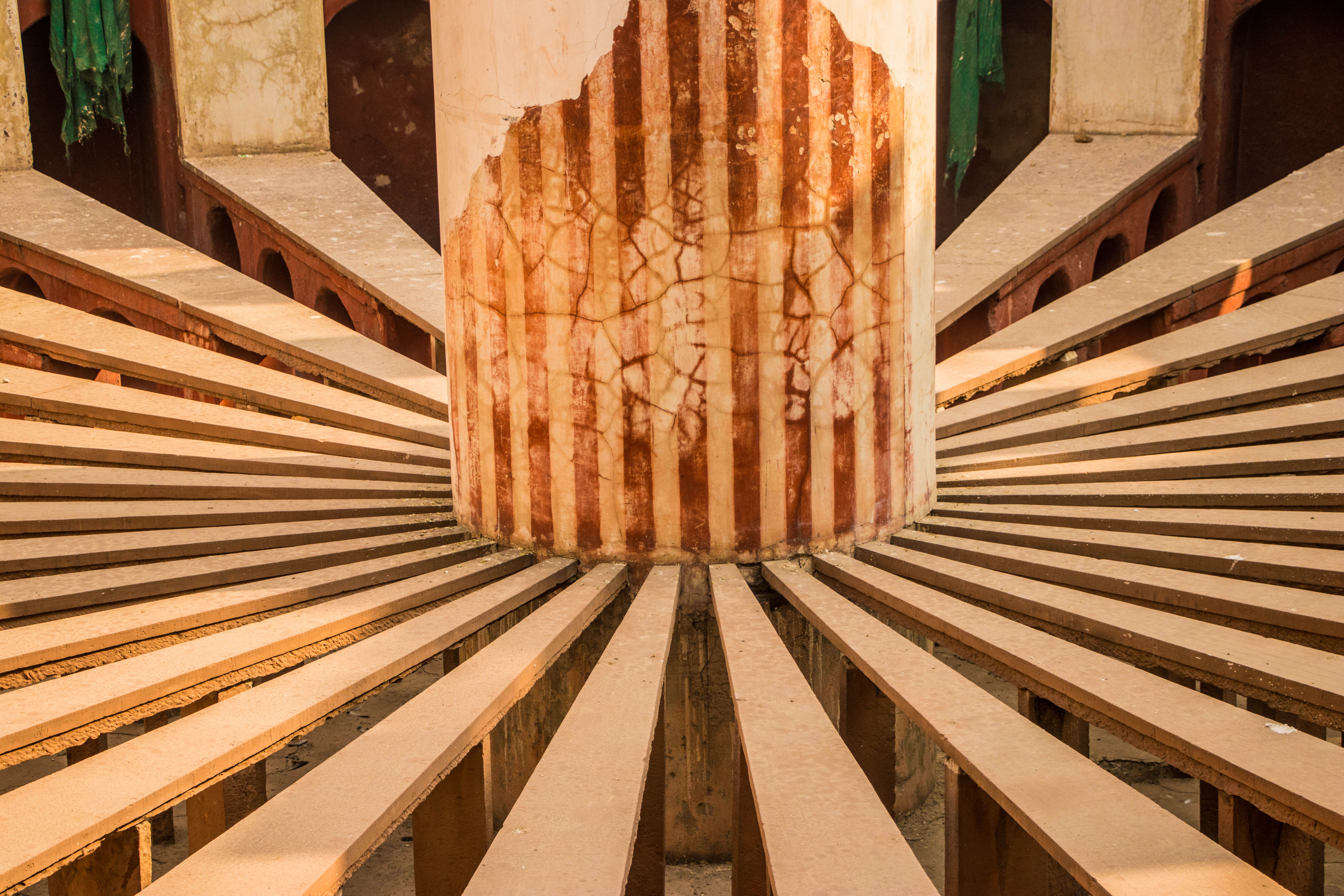
Inside view of Rama Yantra of Jantar Mantar closeup

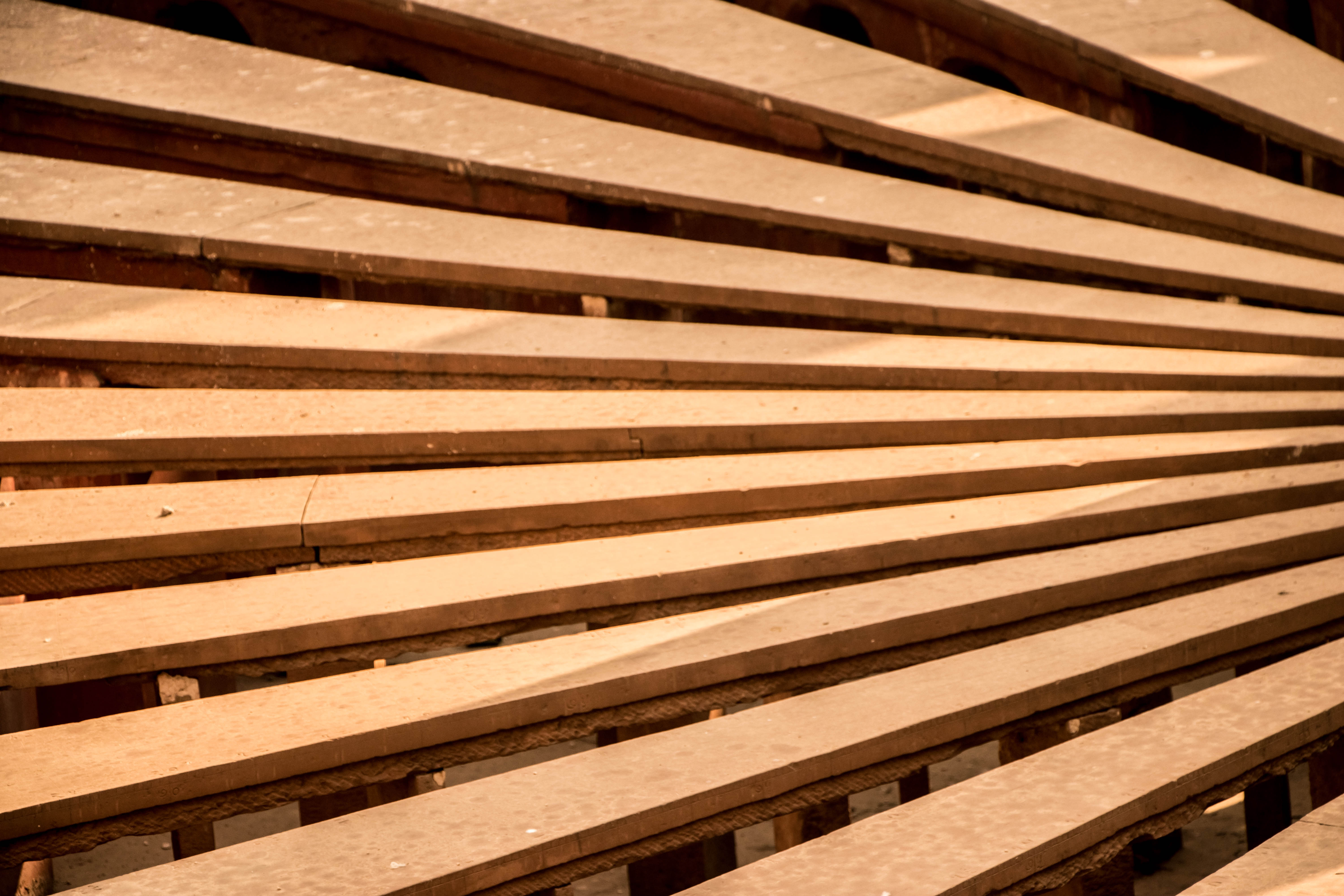
Inside view of Rama Yantra of Jantar Mantar details

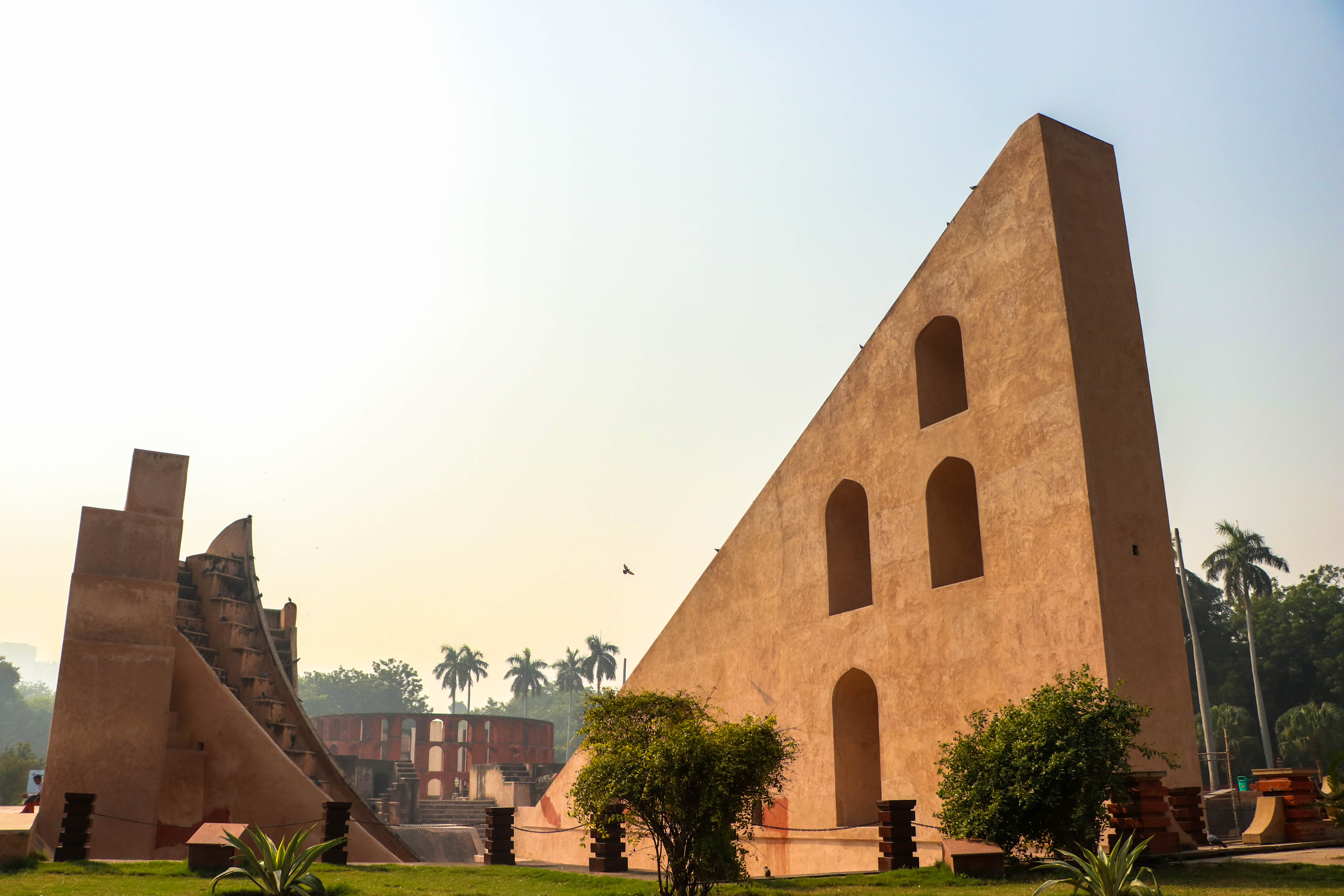
Shastansh Yantra - east side

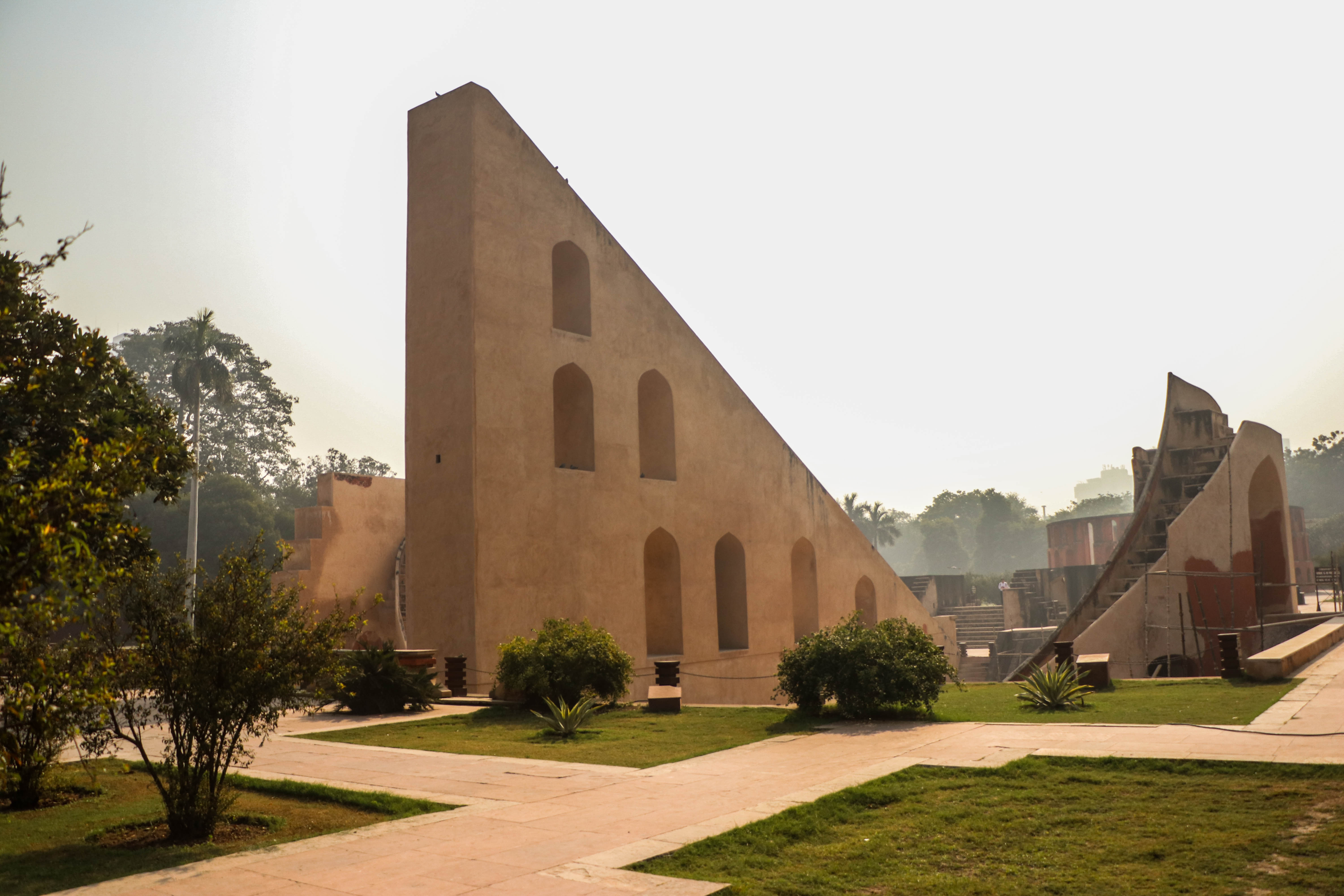
Shastansh Yantra - west side

== See also ==
- List of astronomical observatories
- Mantras
- Rajput architecture
- Tantra
- Yantra
