= Josefa Ordóñez =

Mexican actress and courtesan

Josefa Ordóñez (1728 – after 1792), was an actress and courtesan in 18th century Mexico City.

== Stage career ==
Josefa Ordóñez was born in Granada, the daughter of the actor José Ordóñez, who had some fame as an actor in Cadiz in Spain. She arrived in Mexico City in 1743, in an acting troupe composed of her parents, sister and eight musicians, one of whom was her spouse, the Italian violinist Gregorio Panseco.

In Mexico City, she was engaged as a primera dama (female lead) at the Nuevo Coliseo theater. She was described as an accomplished actress. In 1748, she advanced to be autor de comedias (production manager) of the theater, an unusual accomplishment for an artist of her gender.

She also managed an illegal gambling casino in her home. Her casino was very popular among the male members of the Mexican elite and attracted clients such as the Marquis del Valle de la Colina.

Reportedly, patrons lost thousands of pesos in her casino. She also illegally sold alcoholic beverages. She was on several occasions cautioned by the authorities for her illegal gambling and alcohol businesses, but each time, she only discontinued her business temporarily.

== Courtesan ==
Josefa Ordóñez became famous as a courtesan. Not long after her arrival to Mexico, she had a relationship with Don Esteban, a relative of viceroy Fuenclara. This may not a have been prostitution, however, but rather a love affair, as the viceroy considered it serious enough to demand that she end the relationship. When she did not, her spouse reported her to the viceroy, who had her secluded at the Recogimiento de la Misericordia, a home for women who did not wish to live with their husbands. She was not there long, however.

After leaving Recogimiento de la Misericordia, she resumed as the autor de comedias of the Coliseo. She was supported financially in her candidacy of by her then lover, Jacinte Aguirro Martinéz.

During the 1760s, the 'Poem of the Life of Ordonez' reportedly circulated in Mexico City, making her life as a courtesan famous.

In the early 1760s, she petitioned for a divorce. At that time, she was the mistress of Fernando Monserrat, brother of the viceroy Marquis de Cruillas, and the aristocrat José Gorráez. She eloped with Monserrat and Gorráez to Puebla, where she was arrested and placed in the Colegio de San Joseph de Gracia, a recogimiento or home for separated women. She was refused a divorce and forced to return to her spouse.

In the mid 1760s, she was the mistress of Francisco Cassaviella, secretary of the commander of the royal army. At the bullfighting in the honor of the king, which was held for a period of several days, she famously arrived in the company of Cassaviella. Arriving in a carriage escorted by pages and slaves, presenting herself in expensive dresses and jewelry, she made a scandal by competing with the viceroy for attention from the bullfighter, and was accused of showering the matador with coins to flirt with the governor.

This incident, which was considered a scandal, led to the Inquisition issuing an investigation. 21 witnesses were interrogated. She was denounced as a suspected prostitute, as the salary of her spouse could not finance her luxurious lifestyle; it was noted that she had been given dresses and jewelry from especially Gorráez; that rich men loaned her their carriages and slaves; and that she did not act in accordance with her social class, living a life according to the standard of a noblewoman.

She was not judged as a prostitute, as those allegations could not be proven, but she was denounced as a dangerous corrupting influence on public moral welfare, especially because her lifestyle was regarded as a bad example for the native population of New Spain in particular. The Real Sala del Crimen found her guilty of managing illegal gambling houses, and sentenced her to a short term of imprisonment at a recogimiento followed by exile. Assisted by Gorráez and Cassaviella, she attempted to escape and hide until her contacts could mitigate the sentence, but was reported by her spouse, who accused her of trying to deprive him of finances and abscond with their son.

== Later life ==
In 1770, she was back in Mexico City and petitioned for a divorce. She was refused a divorce by the court, who had her arrested and reissued their sentence of banishment. However, the sentence was not carried out, she was eventually released and allowed to remain in Mexico.

In 1782, Ordonez filed for a divorce. At this point, she lived on an allowance from her spouse, and their relationship was friendly, though the lived separately. The court refused a divorced and forced them to share a household.

In 1792, Ordonez sued her spouse for having used her statues of saints for sexual use. He defended himself by claiming that she refused him intercourse and fired her female servants every time he attempted to have sex with them. The outcome of this case is not known, and this is the last time either of them is mentioned in any documents.
