= Jantar Mantar =

Five early C18 observatories in India

Coordinates: 26°55′28″N 75°49′29.5″E

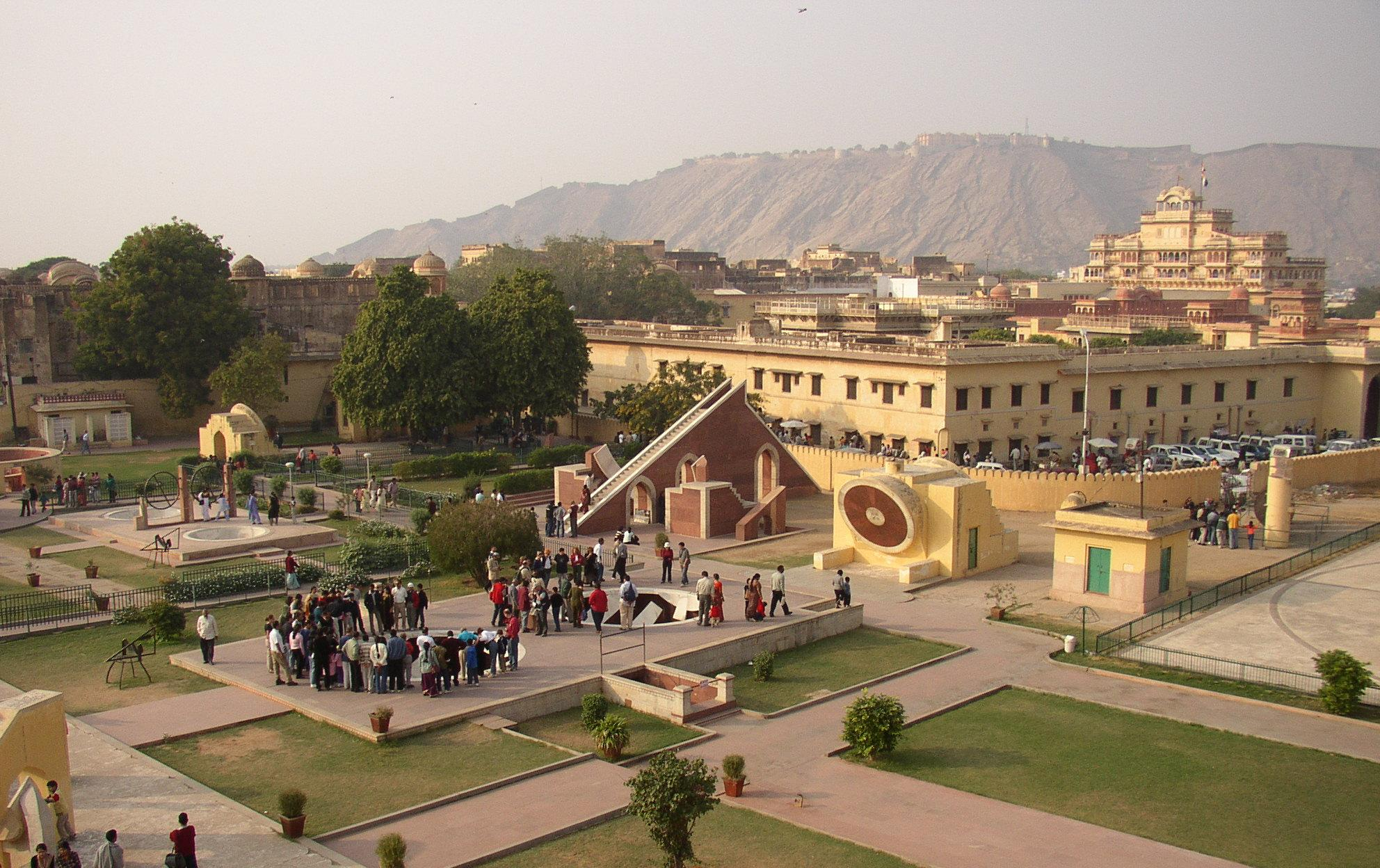
Jantar Mantar in Jaipur

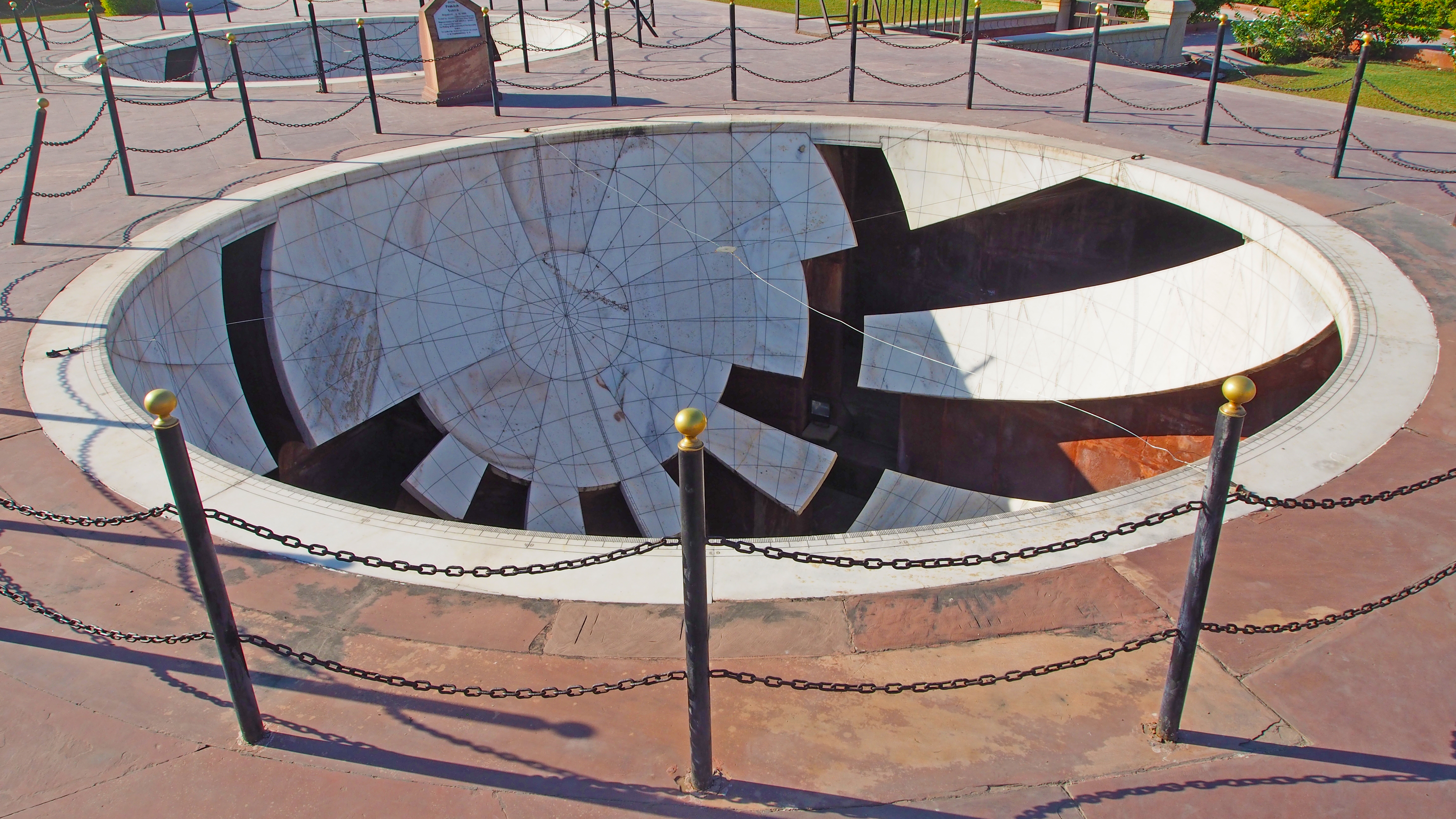
Jai Prakash Yantra Jantar Mantar Jaipur

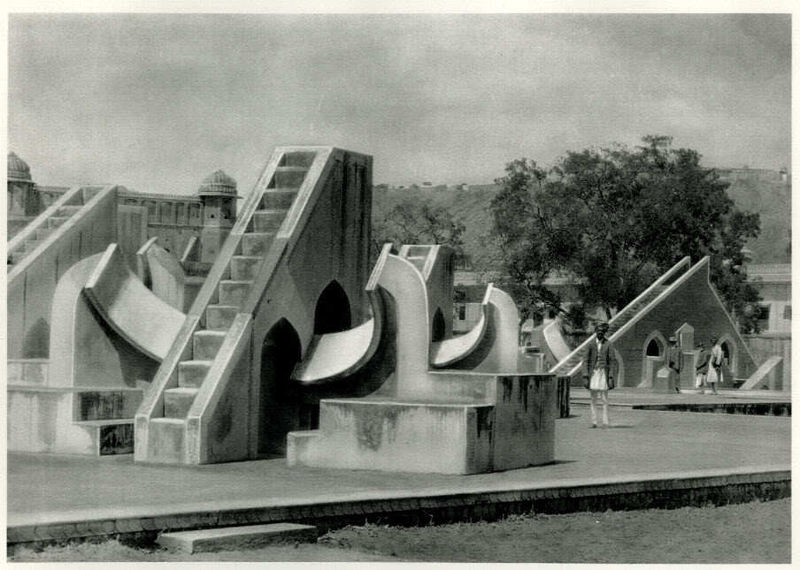
Jantar Mantar in Jaipur. 1928

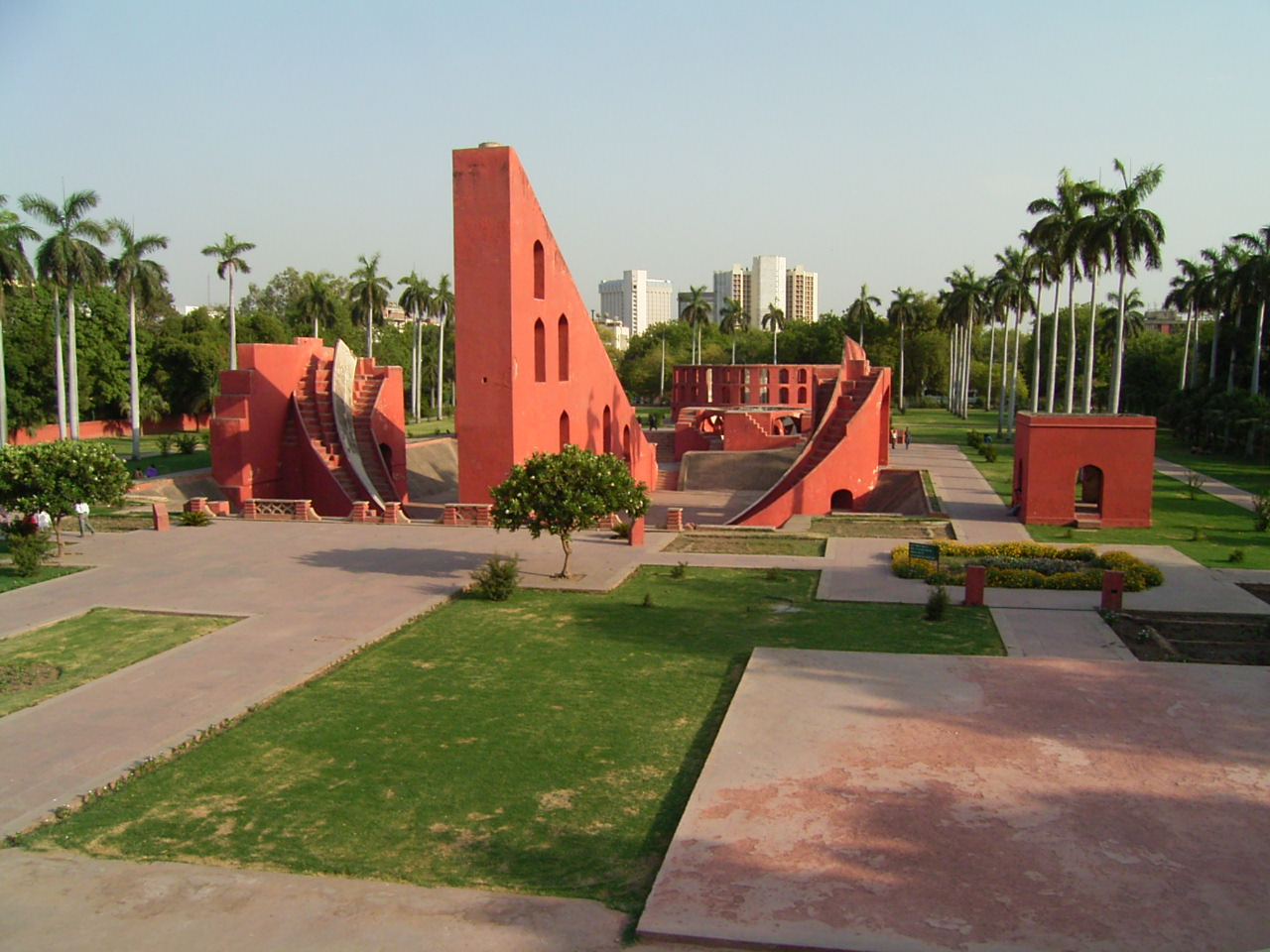
Jantar Mantar in New Delhi

A Jantar Mantar (जंतर मंतर, Hindustani pronunciation: [d͡ʒən̪t̪ər mən̪t̪ər] ‘calculation instruments’) is an assembly of stone-built astronomical instruments, designed to be used with the naked eye. There were five Jantar Mantars in India, built between 1724 and 1735. All were built at the command of the Sawai Jai Singh II, who had a keen interest in mathematics, architecture and astronomy. A total of five Jantar Mantars were constructed across North India: Jaipur, Delhi, Ujjain, Varanasi, and Mathura (the last of which no longer exists). These compilations or Mishra Yantra (‘mixed instruments’) gather up to 19 different astronomical instruments. (Note: The four instruments of Jantar Mantar are Samrat Yantra (a large sundial for calculating time), Jay Prakash Yantra (2 concave hemispherical structures, used to ascertain the position of Sun and other heavenly bodies), Ram Yantra (two large cylindrical structures with open top, used to measure the altitude of stars based on the latitude and the longitude on the earth).)

The largest example is the equinoctial sundial belonging to Jaipur's assembly of instruments, consisting of a gigantic triangular gnomon with the hypotenuse parallel to the Earth's axis. On either side of the gnomon is a quadrant of a circle, parallel to the plane of the equator. The instrument can be used with an accuracy of about 20 seconds by a skilled observer to determine the time of day, and the declination of the Sun and the other heavenly bodies. It is the world's largest stone sundial, and is known as the Samrat Yantra.The Jaipur Jantar Mantar is a UNESCO World Heritage Site.

== History ==
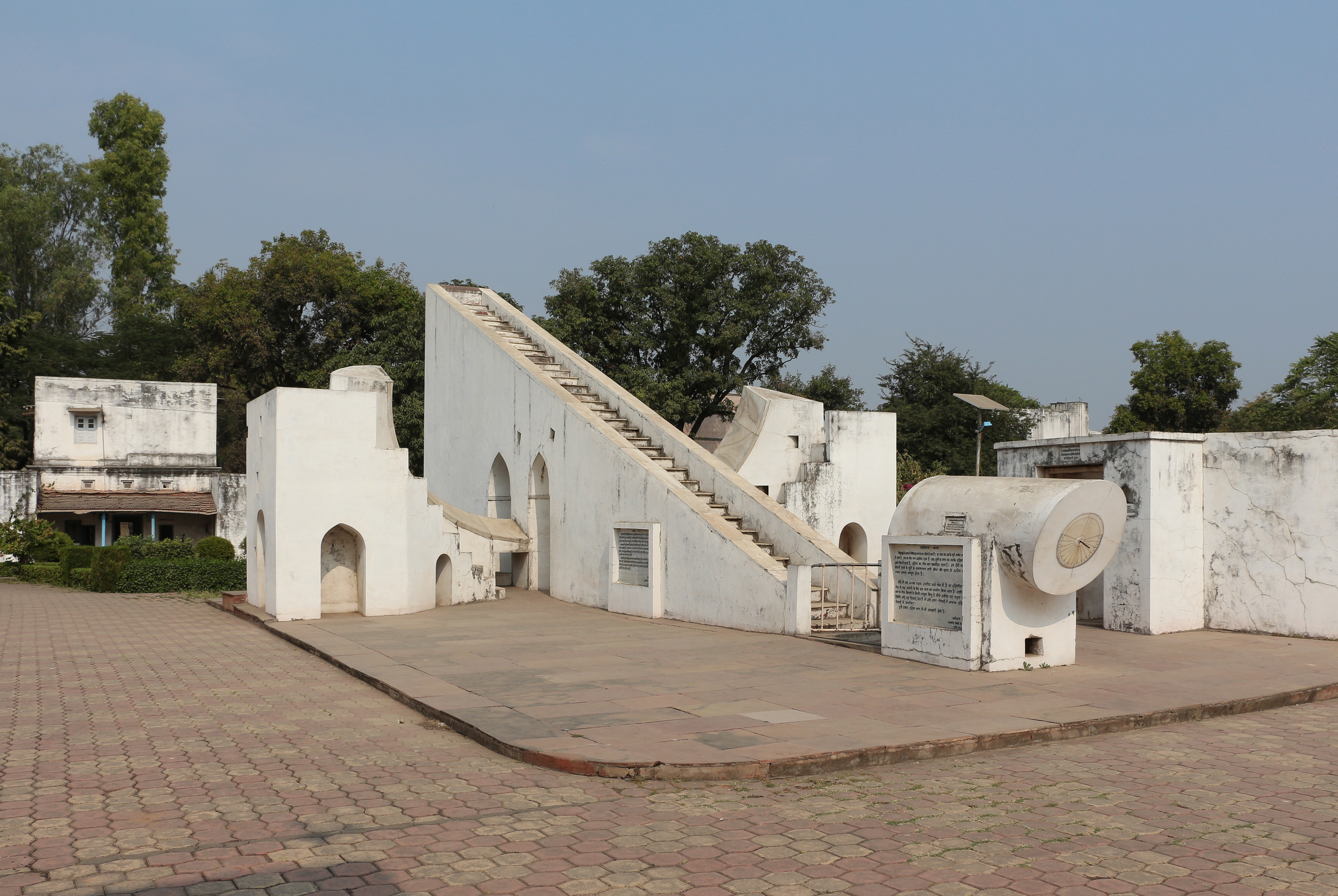
The Sun Dial at the Vedh Shala in Ujjain

In the early 18th century, Sawai Jai Singh of Amber constructed five Jantar Mantar in total, in Delhi, Jaipur, Ujjain, Mathura and Varanasi; they were completed between 1724 and 1735.

The observatory at Mathura and the fort that protected it were destroyed before 1857.

As part of Jantar Mantar there were many instruments like Samrat Yantra, Jai Prakash Yantra, Disha Yantra, Rama Yantra, Chakra Yantra, Rashiwalya Yantra, Dingash Yantra and Utaansh Yantra. The primary purpose of the instruments was to compile astronomical tables and to predict the times and movements of the Sun, Moon and Planets.

== Name ==
The name Jantar Mantar is at least 200 years old, being mentioned in an account from 1803. However, the archives of Kingdom of Amber, such as accounts from 1735 and 1737–1738, do not use this as Jantra, which in the spoken language is corrupted to Jantar. The word Jantra is derived from yantra, meaning instrument, while the suffix Mantar is derived from mantrana meaning consult or calculate.

== See also ==
- Jantar Mantar, Jaipur
- Jantar Mantar, New Delhi
- Jantar Mantar, Varanasi
- Jantar Mantar, Ujjain
- List of archaeoastronomical sites by country
- List of astronomical observatories
- Yantra
- Mantra
