= Jantar Mantar, Varanasi =

Observatory in Varnasi, India

Jantar Mantar
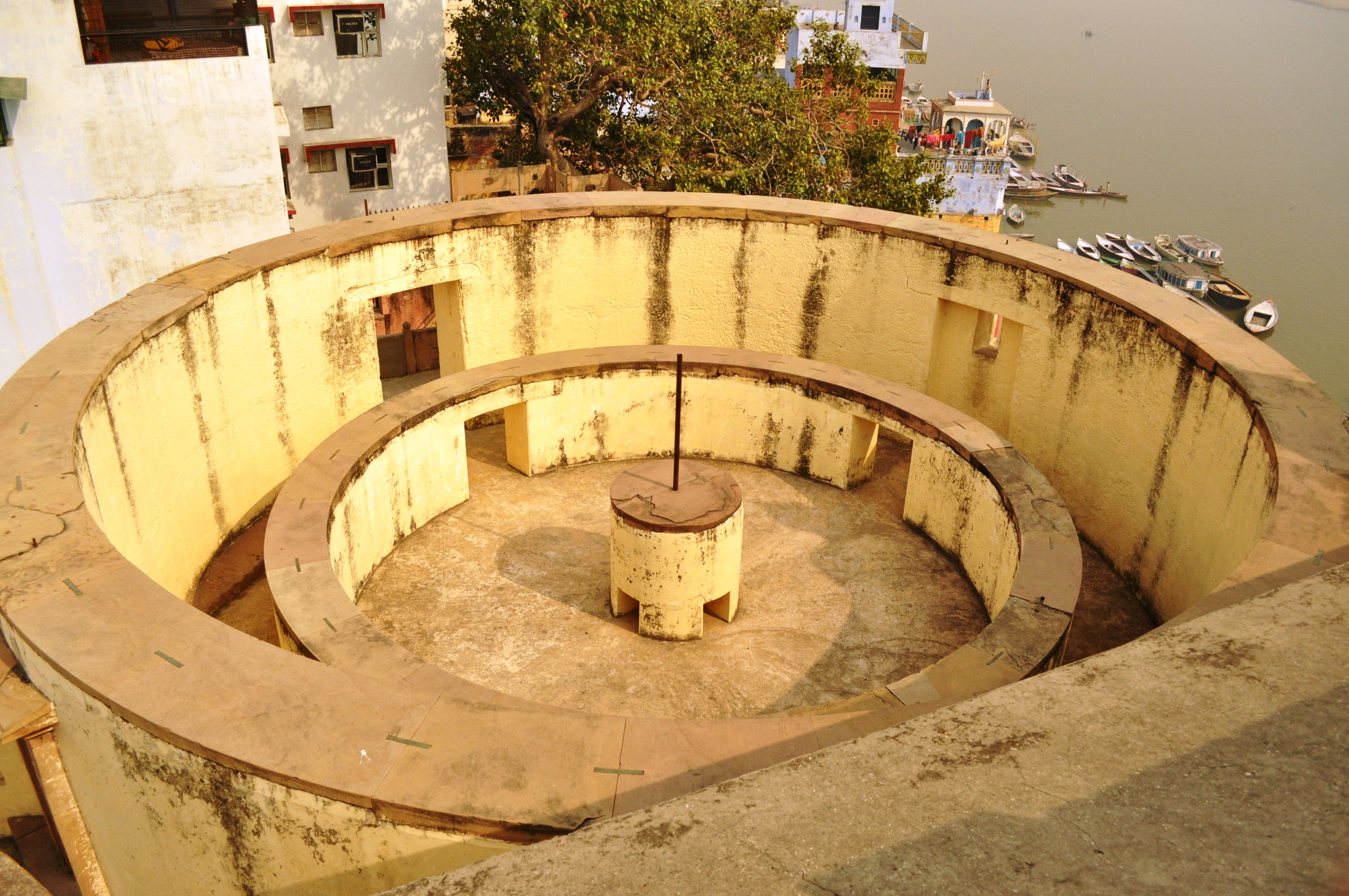
- Digansh Yantra

- Location within India
- 25.307721°N 83.010701°E
- Type: Observatory
- Location: Varanasi, Uttar Pradesh, India

History
- Founder: Maharaja Jai Singh II
- Built: 1737

Site notes
- Elevation: 75.6 m (248 ft)

Jantar Mantar in Varanasi is an observatory designed to be used with the naked eye. It is one of the five Jantar Mantar in India and was built in 1737 by Maharaja Jai Singh II of the Kingdom of Amber (later called Jaipur).

== History ==
Maharaja Jai Singh II was also an astronomer and had a deep interest in science and astronomy. In the early 18th century, he sent his scholars to several countries to study design, construction and technology of the observatories and also the prevalent technology. The scholars returned with their observations and many manuals on astronomy. Subsequently, between 1724 and 1737, Maharaja Jai Singh II had five observatories constructed in Jaipur, Mathura, New Delhi, Ujjain and in Varanasi. There is another evidence of the observatory being built at least two centuries before 1772. According to the Collected writing of Dharampal, Sir Robert Barker, in 1772, wrote that the observatory was built about 200 years before by Raja Mawnsing, son of Jaysing. He states, "The principal curiosity here is the observatory, built by Mawnsing, the son of Jysing, about 200 years ago; there is an exceedingly good mural arch cut upon a fine plaister of chunam, so fine and smooth, that it has the appearance of marble; and though it is certainly very old, it still is perfect, but the index is wanting; that is a loss which could very easily be supplied by a person who has a taste for these studies; for the centres are left in the wall." It clearly indicates that the observatory was built centuries before the British came to India.

A rather curious point arises here out of this chronology about the dating of the Benares observatory: Barker along with Pearse, and A. Campbell visited the observatory in 1772. If the observatory was actually built in 1737, it was only 35 years old at this date. Both Barker and Pearse specifically state that it had been there for some two centuries. They must have arrived at this statement after meeting and conversing with people who, if the observatory had been constructed only 35 years previously, must have been eyewitnesses to its construction. As there was no controversy in 1772 about the date of the construction of the observatory, it is inconceivable that Barker's informants misled him on this point. The conversion of two centuries into 35 years is the most fabulous aspect of this controversy.

== Purpose ==
Jantar Mantar was constructed with an aim of measuring local time, altitude (of the place) and also to measure declination of Sun, stars and planets and to determine eclipses. Motion, speed and properties of stars and planets were also recorded using several special instruments.

== See also ==
- List of astronomical observatories
