= Sawai Jai Singh =

Maharaja of Amber (1688–1743)

Sawai Raja Jai Singh II
- Saramad-e-Raja-e-Hindustan; Raj-Rajeshwar Raj-Rajendra; Shri Maharajadhiraj; Maharaja Sawai; Bahadur; Shri
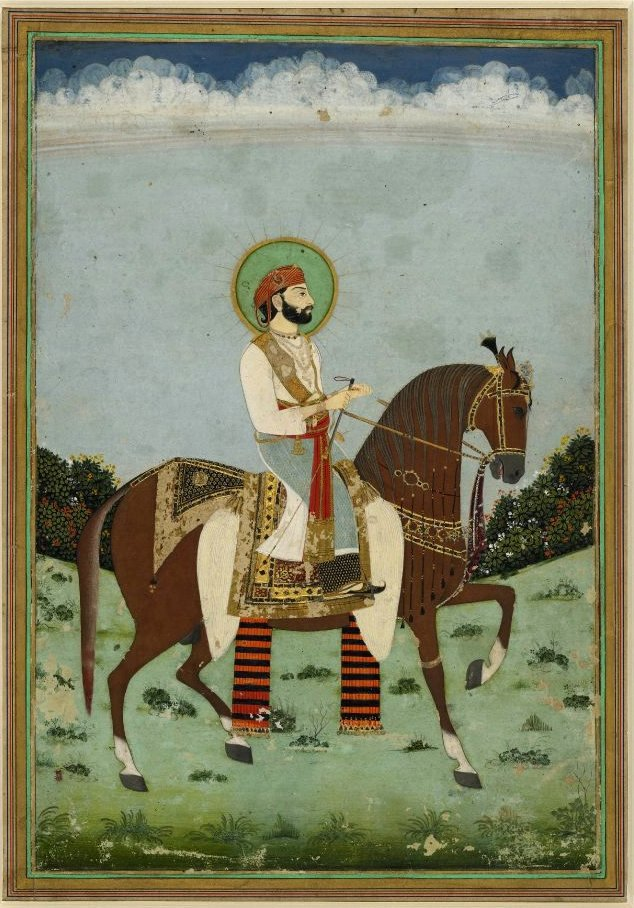
- Sawai Jai Singh's portrait (1725) from British Museum

30th Raja of Amber
- Reign: 5 March 1699 – 18 November 1727
- Coronation: 5 March 1699 (first); 25 January 1700 (second)
- Predecessor: Bishan Singh
- Successor: Ishwari Singh of Jaipur

1st Raja of Jaipur
- Reign: 18 November 1727 – 21 September 1743
- Successor: Ishwari Singh

Subahdar of Malwa
- Reign: 25 October 1732 – 24 December 1737
- Emperor: Muhammad Shah
- Predecessor: Muhammad Khan Bangash
- Successor: Nizam-ul-Mulk, Asaf Jah I
- Born: Kunwar Vijay Singh; 3 November 1688; Kharwa, Ajmer Subah, Mughal Empire
- Died: 21 September 1743 (aged 54); Jaipur, Jaipur State, Rajputana
- Burial: Royal Crematorium at Gaitore, Jaipur, Rajasthan
- Spouse: Gaurji Kesar Kanwarji of Sheopur in Malwa; Khichanji Sukh Kanwarji of Raghogarh-Vijaypur in Malwa; Ranawatji Chandra Kanwarji of Mewar; Rathorji Suraj Kanwarji of Marwar; Rathorji Anand Kanwarji of Kishangarh; Sisodiniji Phool Kanwarji of Banera in Mewar; Chundawatji Amrit Kanwarji of Devgarh in Mewar; Jadonji Indra Kanwarji of Karauli; Hadiji Umaid Kanwarji of Bundi; Hadiji of Kota; Rathorji Chandan Kanwarji of Bandanwara in Ajmer; Rathorji Bakht Kanwarji of Amjhera in Malwa; Tanwarji Laad Kanwarji of Lakhasar in Bikaner; Rathorji of Pisangan in Marwar; Solankiniji Gulab Kanwarji of Aligarh in Tonk
- Issue: Sons: Shiv Singh Ishwari Singh Madho Singh; Daughters: Vichitra Kanwarji m. to Maharaja Abhay Singh of Kingdom of Marwar; Kishan Kanwarji m. to Rao Dalel Singh of Bundi State
Names
- Sawai Raja Jai Singh
Regnal name
- Jai Singh II
- Dynasty: Kachhwaha
- Father: Bishan Singh
- Mother: Rathorji Indra Kanwarji d. of Rao Kesari Singh of Kharwa in Ajmer
- Religion: Hinduism

Sawai Jai Singh II (3 November 1688 – 21 September 1743), was the 30th Kachhwaha ruler of the Kingdom of Amber, who later founded the fortified city of Jaipur and made it his capital. He became the ruler of Amber at the age of 11, after the untimely death of his father Mirza Raja Bishan Singh on 31 December 1699.

Initially, Raja Jai Singh served as a vassal of the Mughal Empire. He was given the title of "Sawai" by Mughal Emperor Aurangzeb before the siege of Vishalgad Fort in Deccan. "Sawai" means one and a quarter times superior to his contemporaries. He received the title of "Maharaja Sawai, Raj Rajeshwar, Shri Rajadhiraj " in the year 1723 which happened to be the reign of later Mughals under emperor Muhammad Shah; this was in addition to the title of "Saramad-i-Raja-i-Hindustan", conferred on him on 21 April 1721.

Sawai Mirza Raja Jai Singh asserted his sovereignty by performing the Ashvamedha sacrifice, an ancient rite that is conducted by high rulers. He moved his kingdom's capital from the town of Amber to the newly established walled city of Jaipur in 1727 and performed two Ashwamedha sacrifices, one in 1734, and again in 1741.

Sawai Jai Singh II other than administration and state craftship had a profound interest in the fields of Mathematics, Architecture, Astronomy, Astrology and Literature. He commissioned the Jantar Mantar observatories at multiple places in India, including his capital Jaipur. He had Euclid's "Elements of Geometry" translated into Sanskrit.

== The situation on his accession ==
When Jai Singh acceded to the ancestral throne at Amber, he had barely enough resources to pay for the support of 1000 cavalry. This abysmal situation had arisen during the previous 96 years, coinciding with the reign of the Mughal Emperor Aurangzeb. The Jaipur kings had always preferred diplomacy over arms in their dealings with the Mughals, since their kingdom was located so close to the Mughal power centers of Delhi and Agra.

Six months after his accession, Jai Singh was ordered by Aurangzeb to serve in the Deccan wars. However, there was a delay of about one year in his responding to the call. One reason for this was that he was ordered to recruit a large force, in excess of the contingent required by his mansab. He also had to conclude his marriage with the daughter of Udit Singh, the nephew of Raja Uttam Ram Gaur of Sheopur, in March 1701. Jai Singh reached Burhanpur on 3 August 1701, but he could not proceed further due to heavy rains. On 13 September 1701, an additional cut in his rank (by 500) and pay was made. His feat of arms at the siege of Khelna (1702) was rewarded with the mere restoration of his earlier rank and the title of Sawai (meaning one and a quarter, i.e., more capable than one man). When Aurangzeb's grandson Bidar Bakht deputed Sawai Jai Singh to govern the province of Malwa (1704), Aurangzeb angrily revoked this appointment as jaiz nist (invalid).

== War with the Mughals ==
The Mughal emperor Bahadur Shah I conferred the title of Mirza Raja to Jai Singh's younger brother, Vijay Singh, and declared him as the Raja of Amber ousting Jai Singh from the throne and demoting him to an ordinary Jagirdar. In response, Jai Singh formed a political alliance with the Kingdom of Marwar and matrimonial alliance with the Kingdom of Mewar against the emperor, leading to the Rajput rebellion and re-annexation of lost territories.

== Jai Singh and the Marathas ==
The Kachhwaha ruler was appointed to govern Malwa three times between 1714 and 1737. In Jai Singh's first viceroyalty (subahdar) of Malwa (1714–1717), isolated Maratha war-bands that entered the province from the south (Deccan) were constantly defeated and repulsed by Jai Singh. In 1728, Bajirao I defeated the Nizam of Hyderabad, part of the Mughal Deccan (Treaty of Mungi-Shevgaon, March 1728). With an agreement from Baji Rao to spare the Nizam's own domains, the Nizam allowed the Marathas a free passage through Berar and Khandesh, the gateway into Hindustan. The Marathas were then able to plant a permanent camp beyond the southern frontier of Malwa. Following the victory of the Peshwa's brother, Chimaji Appa, over the governor of Malwa Girdhar Bahadur on 29 November 1728, coupled with the subsequent rebellion in Bundelkhand led by Chhatrasal with Maratha support, the Marathas were able to convulse much of the country beyond the Northern and Southern borders of the Narmada River.

Upon Jai Singh's second appointment to Malwa (1729–1730), as a far-sighted statesmen, Jai Singh was able to perceive a complete change in the political situation, during the twelve years which had passed since his first viceroyalty there. Imperial power had by then been crippled by the rebellion of the Nizam of Hyderabad as well as the ability of Peshwa Baji Rao to stabilize the internal situation of the Marathas, which resulted in their occupation of Gujarat and an immense increase of their forces. Nonetheless, in the name of the friendship between their royal ancestors, Jai Singh II, was able to appeal to Shahu I to restore to the imperialist, the great fortress of Mandu which the Marathas had occupied a few weeks earlier (order date 19 March 1730). By May, Jai Singh was recalled back to Rajputana to attend more pressing matters, which thus resulted in his two years disassociation from Malwa.

In 1732, Jai Singh was for the last time, appointed Subahdar of Malwa (1732–1737), during which time he petitioned Muhammad Shah to compromise with the Marathas under Shahu, who remembered the positive relationship between the late Jai Singh I and his own grandfather, Shivaji. For this sensible advice, coupled with anti–Jai Singh rhetoric at the Mughal court at Delhi, as well as Muhammad Shah's inability to assert his own will, Jai Singh was removed from his post while the Mughals decided on war. In this regard, Jai Singh II was practically the last subahdar of Malwa, as Nizam-ul-Mulk, Asaf Jah I, who replaced him in 1737, met with most discomfiting failure at the hands of the Peshwa, resulting with the ceding of the whole of Malwa to the Marathas (Treaty of Duraha, Saturday 7 January 1738).

Exploiting the weakening of the Mughal state, the Persian raider Nader Shah defeated the Mughals at Karnal (13 February 1739) and finally sacked Delhi (11 March, same year). Through this period of turmoil, Jai Singh remained in his own state—but he was not idle. Foreseeing the troubled time ahead, Jai Singh II initiated a program of extensive fortification within the thikanas under Jaipur. To this day, most of the later fortifications around the former Jaipur state, are attributed to the reign of Jai Singh II.

== Militarization ==
Jai Singh increased the size of his ancestral kingdom by annexing lands from the Mughals and rebel chieftains—sometimes by paying money and sometimes through war. The most substantial acquisition was of Shekhawati, which also gave Jai Singh the most able recruits for his fast-expanding army.

According to an estimate by Jadunath Sarkar, Jai Singh's regular army did not exceed 40,000 men, which would have cost about 60 lakhs a year, but his strength lay in the large number of artillery and copious supply of munitions which he was careful to maintain and his rule of arming his foot with matchlocks instead of the traditional Rajput sword and shield - He had the wisdom to recognize early the change which firearms had introduced in Indian warfare and to prepare for himself for the new war by raising the fire-power of his army to the maximum, he thus anticipated the success of later Indian rulers like Mirza Najaf Khan, Mahadaji Shinde and Tipu Sultan. Jai Singh's experimental weapon, Jaivana Cannon, which he created prior to the shift of his capital to Jaipur, remains the largest wheeled cannon in the world. In 1732, Jai Singh, as governor of Malwa, maintained a force of 30,000 soldiers, split evenly into horsemen and foot-Musketeers. This figure does not include his contingents in the Subahs of Agra and Ajmer or in his own dominions and fort garrisons.

== Diplomacy in Rajputana ==
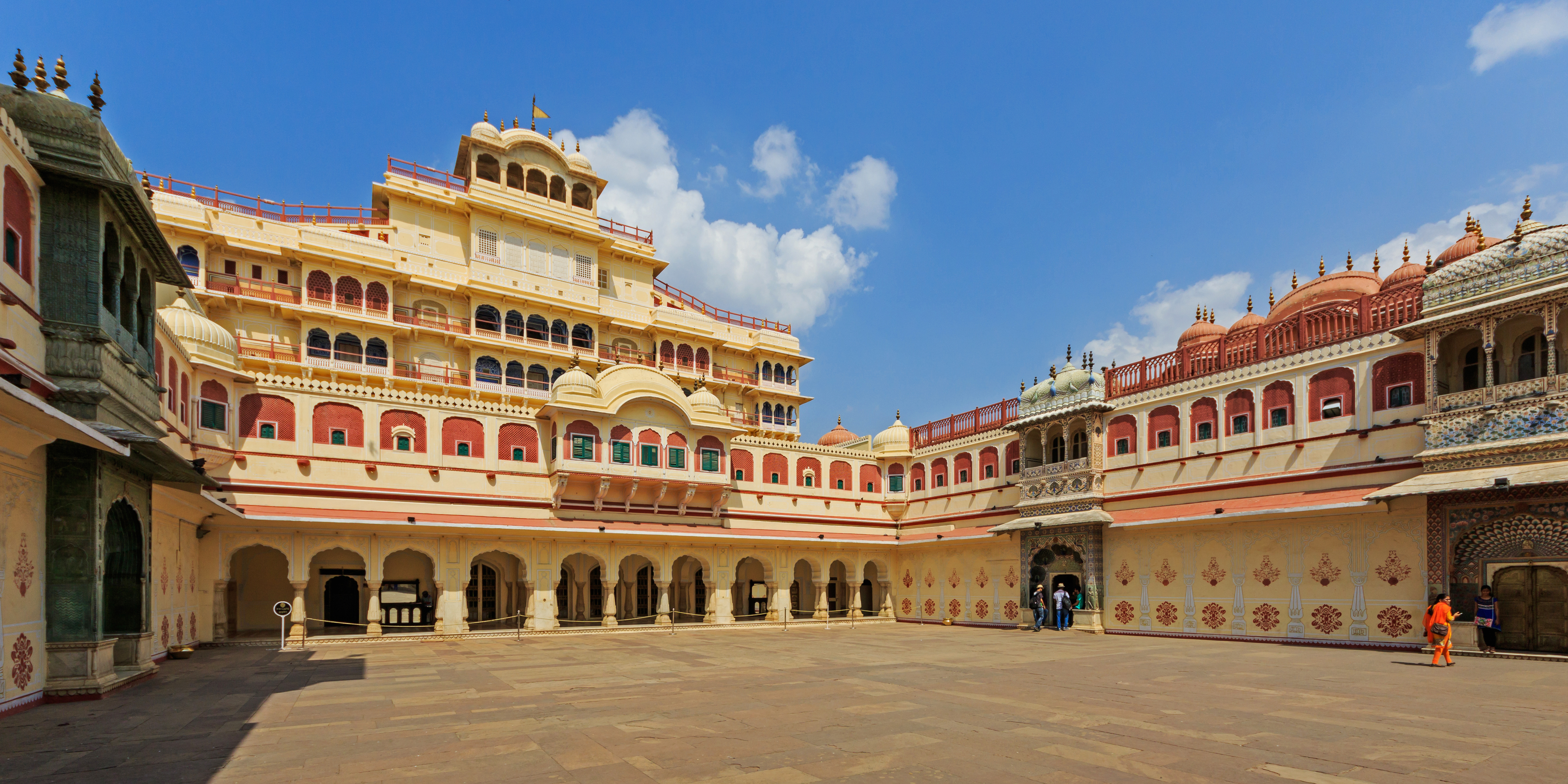
City Palace, Jaipur built in 1727

The armed strength of Jai Singh had made him the most formidable ruler in Northern India, and all the other Rajas looked up to him for protection and the promotion of their interests at the Imperial court. As the fast-spreading Maratha dominion and their raids into the north had caused alarm among the Rajput chiefs, Jai Singh called a conference of Rajput rulers at Hurda (1734) to deal with this peril, but nothing came of it. In 1736, Peshwa Baji Rao imposed tribute on the Kingdom of Mewar. To thwart further Maratha expansion, Sawai Jai Singh planned the formation of a local hegemony, led by Jaipur, and a political union in Rajputana. To this end, he annexed Bundi and Rampura in the Malwa plateau, strengthen alliance with Mewar, and intervened in the affairs of the Rathores of Bikaner and Jodhpur. These half-successful attempts only stiffened the backs of the other Rajput clans, who turned to the Marathas for aid, consequently hastening that state's domination over Rajasthan. Jai Singh's ambitions in Rajputana failed after the Battle of Gangwana.

== Death and succession ==
The Battle of Gangwana was Jai Singh's last significant battle.Due to old age and some health issues he died two years later, in 1743. Madho Singh I later avenged his father by poisoning Bakht Singh of Marwar. Jai Singh was cremated at the Royal Crematorium at Gaitore in the north of Jaipur. He was succeeded by his son Ishwari Singh.

== Contributions to society, culture, and science ==
Jai Singh was the first Hindu ruler in centuries to perform ancient Vedic ceremonies like the Ashvamedha sacrifices (1716) and the Vajapeya (1734); on both occasions, vast amounts were distributed in charity. Being initiated in the Nimbarka Sampradaya of the Vaishnava sect, he also promoted Sanskrit learning and initiated reforms in Hindu society, including the abolition of Sati and the reduction of wasteful expenditures associated with Rajput weddings. It was at Jai Singh's insistence that the hated Jizya tax, imposed on the Hindu population by Aurangzeb (1679), was finally abolished by the Emperor Muhammad Shah in 1720. In 1728, Jai Singh prevailed on him to also withdraw the pilgrimage tax on Hindus at Gaya.

In 1719, he was witness to a noisy controversy in the court of Mughal Emperor Muhammad Shah. The argument concerned astronomical calculations intended determine an auspicious date on which the emperor could start a journey. This discussion led Jai Singh to believe that the nation needed to be educated on the subject of astronomy. His interest may have been kindled as early as 1702 by his tutor Jagannatha Samrat. Despite local wars, foreign invasions, and consequent turmoil, Jai Singh found time and energy to build astronomical observatories.

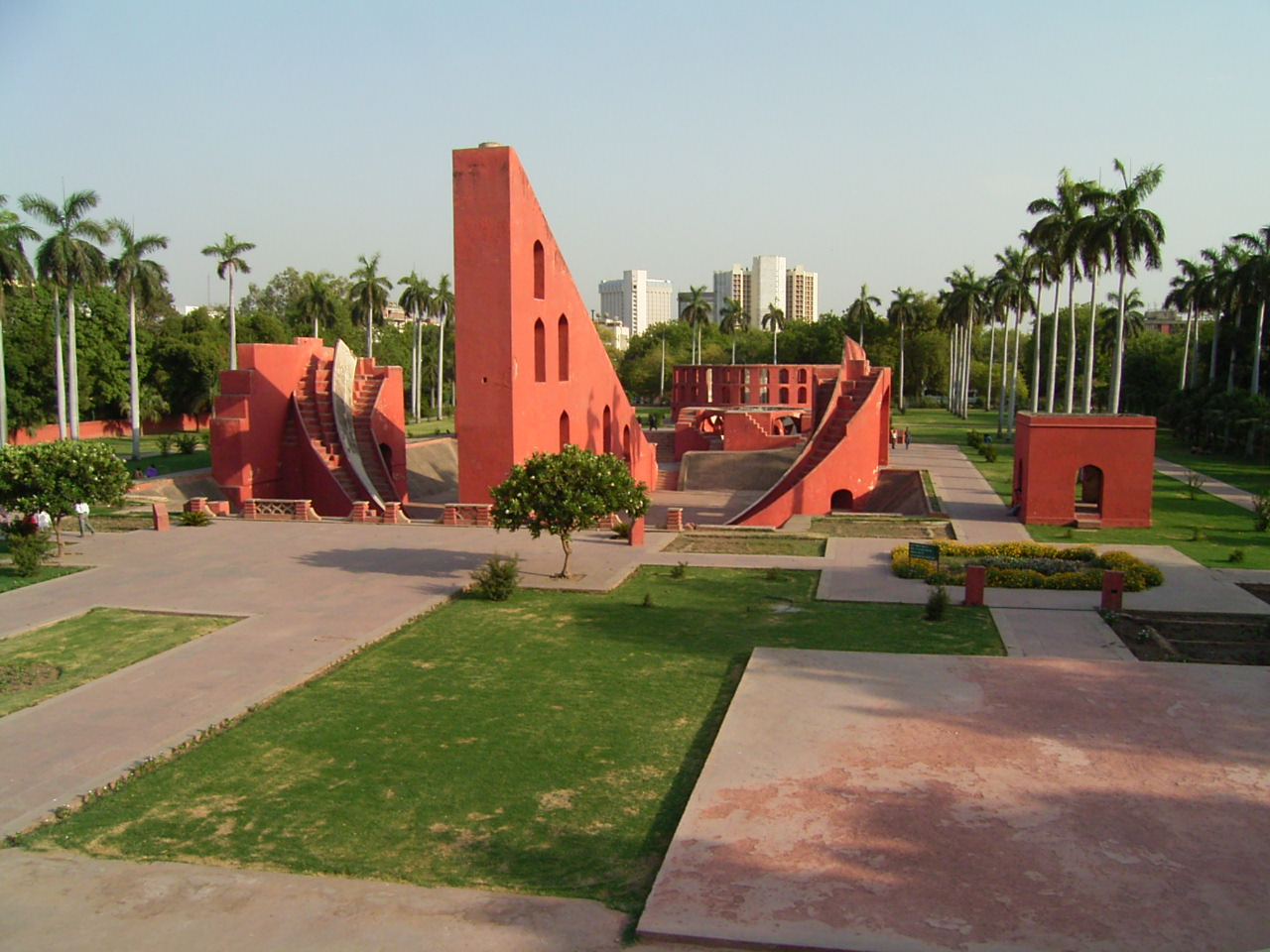
The observatory built by Sawai Jai Singh in Delhi

He ordered the construction of five such buildings—at Delhi, Mathura (in his Agra province), Varanasi, Ujjain (capital of his Malwa province), and his own capital of Jaipur. His astronomical observations were remarkably accurate. He drew up a set of tables, entitled Zij-i-Muhammadshahi, to enable people to make astronomical observations. He instigated the translation into Sanskrit of Euclid's Elements of Geometry, several works on trigonometry, and Napier's work on the construction and use of logarithms. Relying primarily on Indian astronomy, his observatories were used to accurately predict eclipses and other astronomical events. The observational techniques and instruments used in his observatories were also superior to those used by the European Jesuit astronomers he invited to his observatories. Termed as the Jantar Mantar, they consisted of the Ram Yantra (a cylindrical building with an open top and a pillar in its center), the Jai Prakash (a concave hemisphere), the Samrat Yantra (a huge equinoctial dial), the Digamsha Yantra (a pillar surrounded by two circular walls), and the Narivalaya Yantra (a cylindrical dial).

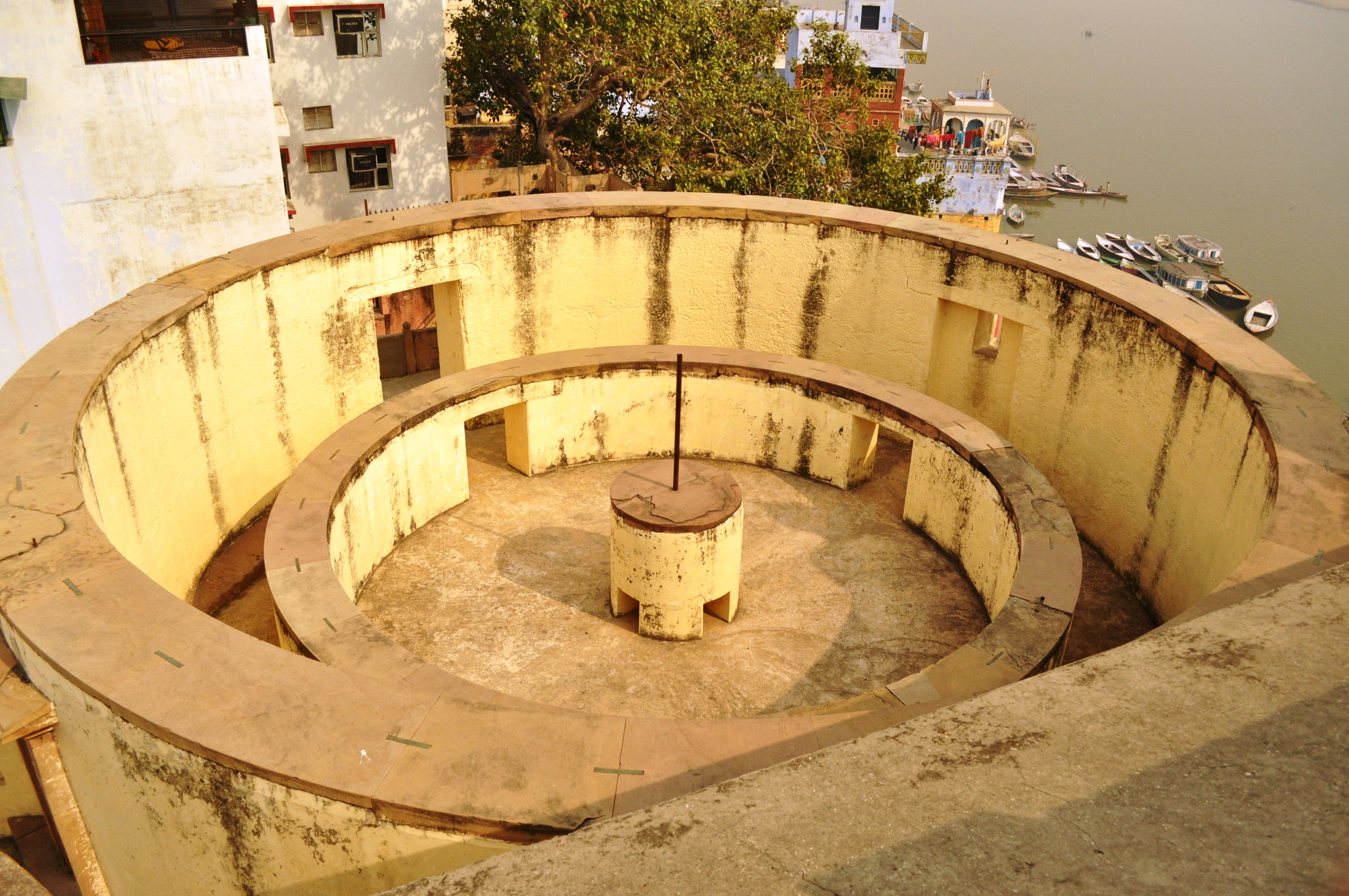
Jantar Mantar in Varanasi

The Samrat Yantra is a huge sundial. It can be used to estimate the local time, to locate the Pole star, and to measure the declination of celestial objects. The Rama Yantra can be used to measure the altitude and azimuth of celestial objects. The Shanku Yantra can be used to measure the latitude of the place.

Jai Singh's greatest achievement was the construction of Jaipur (known originally as Jai Nagara in Sanskrit and as the 'city of victory' and later as the 'pink city' by the British by the early 20th century). The planned city later became the capital of the Indian state of Rajasthan. Construction of the new capital began as early as 1725, although it was only in 1727 that the foundation stone was ceremonially laid. By 1733, Jaipur officially replaced Amber as the capital of the Kachhwaha. Built on the ancient Hindu grid pattern, found in the archaeological ruins of 3000 BCE, it was designed by Vidyadhar Bhattacharya, who was educated in the ancient Sanskrit manuals on city-planning and architecture (silpa-sutras). Merchants from all over India settled down in the relative safety of this rich city, protected by thick walls and a garrison of 17,000 (including adequate artillery). The Sanskrit epic 'Ishvar Vilas Mahakavya', written by Kavikalanidhi Devarshi Shrikrishna Bhatt, recounts various important events of that era, including the construction of Jaipur, in detail.

Jai Singh also translated works by people like John Napier. Due to his versatility and achievements, Jai Singh II is remembered as the most enlightened king of 18th-century India. These days Jai Singh's observatories ,Yantra-Mantra now called as Jantar Mantar, at Jaipur, Varanasi, and Ujjain are functional. The one at Delhi is not functional and the one at Mathura disappeared a long time ago.

== See also ==
- Kachhwaha
- List of Rajputs

== Bibliography ==
1. Bhatnagar, V. S. (1974) Life and Times of Sawai Jai Singh, 1688-1743, Delhi: Impex India
2. Sarkar, Jadunath (1984, reprint 1994) A History of Jaipur, New Delhi: Orient Longman, ISBN 81-250-0333-9
3. Jyoti J. (2001) Royal Jaipur, Roli Books, ISBN 81-7436-166-9
4. Tillotson G, (2006) Jaipur Nama, Penguin books
5. Schwarz, Michiel (1980) Observatoria : De astronomische instrumenten van Maharaja Sawai Jai Singh II in New Delhi, Jaipur, Ujjain en Benares, Amsterdam: Westland/Utrecht Hypothekbank
6. Sharma, Virendra Nath (1995, revised edition 2016) Sawai Jai Singh and his Astronomy, Delhi: Motilal Barnasidass Publishers
