= Amjhira =

- Village
- Location within Madhya Pradesh Location within India
- Coordinates: 23.200675°N 77.537862°E
- Country: India
- State: Madhya Pradesh
- District: Bhopal
- Tehsil: Huzur

Population (2011)
  - Total: 1,115
- Time zone: UTC+5:30 (IST)
- ISO 3166 code: MP-IN
- Census code: 482442

Amjhira is a village in the Bhopal district of Madhya Pradesh, India. It is located in the Huzur tehsil and the Phanda block.

== Demographics ==
According to the 2011 census of India, Amjhira has 224 households. The effective literacy rate (i.e. the literacy rate of population excluding children aged 6 and below) is 50.86%.

Demographics (2011 Census)
	Total	Male	Female
Population	1115	583	532
Children aged below 6 years	183	97	86
Scheduled caste	53	24	29
Scheduled tribe	22	14	8
Literates	474	277	197
Workers (all)	463	287	176
Main workers (total)	377	257	120
Main workers: Cultivators	118	108	10
Main workers: Agricultural labourers	33	27	6
Main workers: Household industry workers	110	14	96
Main workers: Other	116	108	8
Marginal workers (total)	86	30	56
Marginal workers: Cultivators	17	10	7
Marginal workers: Agricultural labourers	9	5	4
Marginal workers: Household industry workers	36	2	34
Marginal workers: Others	24	13	11
Non-workers	652	296	356
