= National Eligibility cum Entrance Test (Postgraduate) =

Entrance examination for postgraduate medical admissions in India

National Eligibility Entrance Test (Postgraduate)
- Acronym: NEET (PG)
- Type: Computer based test
- Administrator: National Board of Examinations in Medical Sciences
- Skills tested: Subjects as per the Graduate Medical Education Regulations
- Purpose: Admission to postgraduate medical programmes
- Year started: 2013
- Duration: 210 minutes
- Score range: -200 to 800
- Score validity: 1 year
- Offered: Once a year
- Regions: India
- Languages: English
- Annual number of test takers: ▲2,85,000 (2024)
- Prerequisites: MBBS degree as per Indian Medical Council Act
- Fee: ₹4000 ₹2500 (SC/ST/PWD)
- Used by: AFMS and ESI Institutions, Medical Educational Institutions of Central and State Govts
- Website: nbe.edu.in
- As per 2024 information bulletin

The National Eligibility cum Entrance Test (Postgraduate), abbreviated as NEET (PG) is an entrance examination in India conducted by the National Board of Examinations in Medical Sciences (NBEMS) for determining eligibility of candidates for admission to postgraduate medical programmes in government or private medical colleges, such as Doctor of Medicine (MD), Master of Surgery (MS), PG diploma, Diplomate of National Board (DNB), Doctorate of National Board (DrNB), and NBEMS diploma. This exam replaced All India Post Graduate Medical Entrance Examination (AIPGMEE). The counselling and seat allotment is conducted by Directorate General of Health Services (DGHS).

== Eligibility criteria ==
Candidates studying in India, having Bachelor of Medicine, Bachelor of Surgery (MBBS) degree or provisional MBBS pass certificate as per Indian Medical Council Act, and MBBS registration certificate issued by the Indian or state medical council and have completed one year of internship or will be completing the internship, are eligible to apply for the exam.

The candidates having Indian citizenship, but have graduated from any foreign medical college, should qualify the Medical Council of India Screening Test (also called Foreign Medical Graduate Examination). They also need to be registered with Indian or state medical council and have completed one year of internship or will be completing the internship.

For foreign nationals, registration is necessary from the country they have obtained basic medical qualification. Medical Council of India (MCI) registration is not compulsory. Temporary registration might be given on payment of application fees.

== Organising body ==
The exam is conducted by National Board of Examinations, an autonomous organisation of Ministry of Health and Family Welfare, Government of India. It also conducts exams other National Eligibility cum Entrance Test for Super Specialty courses (SS) and Master of Dental Surgery (MDS).

== Exam pattern and structure ==
The examination is computer based, consisting of 200 mcqs multiple choice questions (MCQ) with single response. The language is English only. It is held in 162 test centres across India. For each correct response, four marks are allotted and for each wrong response one mark (25 percent) is deducted. No marks awarded or deducted for an unattempted question. There will be 5 section of 40 question each with time slot of 42 minutes, then that part will be auto submitted once the time slot is over. It can't be reviewed then, however, this pattern has recently incorporated for NEET-PG 2024. The Time allotted is 3.5 hours (210 minutes).

=== Syllabus ===
The syllabus comprises subjects prescribed by the Graduate Medical Education Regulations issued by Medical Council of India. It includes Anatomy, Physiology, Biochemistry, Pathology, Pharmacology, Microbiology, Forensic Medicine, Preventive and Social Medicine, General Medicine, General Surgery, Obstetrics & Gynaecology, Pediatrics, Otorhinolaryngology, Ophthalmology, Dermatology, Anesthesiology, Radiology, Psychiatry, Orthopaedics

== Application fees ==
The application fees for General and Other Backward Classes (OBC) candidates is ₹3,500 (equivalent to ₹3,700 or US$40 in 2026) and for Scheduled Castes (SC), Scheduled Tribes (ST), Person with Disabilities (PwD) candidates is ₹2,500 (equivalent to ₹2,700 or US$28 in 2026). The application process is completely online.

== Cutoff and results ==
The cutoff marks in the exam is divided into four categories based on the groups of people and castes in India. Cutoffs were reduced in 2020. For General candidates it is 30th percentile, for general but PwD candidates it is 25th percentile, for both SC/ST/OBC and PwD under SC/ST/OBC, it is 20th percentile.

The results of the exam is valid for current admission session, i.e. one year. It can not be carried forward for the next session.

== Seat allotment ==
The whole seat pool for Diploma, MD and MS is divided into half. One for medical institutes under central government (which is the all India 50 percent quota) and the rest half for all the respective state governments. Seat allotment is done through a centralised counselling procedure. For all India quota it is conducted by DGHS. Merit list of qualified students is prepared based on score and percentile. Seats are reserved for the SC, ST, PwD and non-creamy layer OBC candidates, which is 15, 7.5, 5 and 27 percent respectively. Wherever Economically Weaker Section (EWS) quota is implemented, 10 percent seats will be reserved for them. Eligibility and other criteria are different in case of Armed Forces Medical Services institutions. There is no reservation in Armed Forces Medical Service Institutions.

== Institutes ==
114 medical colleges and institutes, both government and private, take admission through this exam.

=== Institutes not covered by the exam ===
5 INIs (Institute of National Importance) are exempted from centralised admission via this exam. They are:

1. All India Institutes of Medical Sciences (AIIMSs)
2. Postgraduate Institute of Medical Education and Research (PGIMER)
3. Jawaharlal Institute of Postgraduate Medical Education and Research (JIPMER)
4. National Institute of Mental Health and Neurosciences (NIMHANS)
5. Sree Chitra Tirunal Institute for Medical Sciences and Technology (SCTIMST)

Admission to these institutes is via another entrance test i.e. INI-CET.

== Number of applicants ==
In 2020, 167,102 candidates registered for the exam, 18,389 more than the previous year. 166,702 candidates were Indian citizens, 16 were Non-Resident of India, 130 Person of Indian Origin and 254 foreigners. 160,888 candidates appeared for the exam and, out of which 89,549 qualified. 12 were declared ineligible.

== DNB courses ==
The exam is also used for admission into various Diplomate of National Board (DNB) courses. No other entrance exam is held for it. The eligibility criteria are same as that of PG courses. Reservation in DNB courses is determined by the institution.

== Controversies ==
=== NEET (PG) 2021 ===
The exam is generally held in December–January but in 2021 it was postponed due to the COVID-19 pandemic and was held in September 2021. However, counselling for students who appeared for the exam has not been conducted yet because of cases pending in the Supreme Court over reservations to the economically weaker section. The delay in counselling has resulted in shortage of doctors at hospitals, increasing workload for existing resident doctors. Protests over the delay in counselling began on November 27 with resident doctors boycotting work in out patient departments which gradually escalated to “withdrawal from all service”. The boycott was suspended on December 9 after the doctors were given assurances that the counselling schedule will be released in a week, but they resumed the boycott from December 17 as the government failed to act on those assurances. On 27 December 2021, resident doctors that were marching towards the Supreme Court were stopped and “brutally thrashed, dragged, and detained” by the Delhi Police according to FORDA, an association of resident doctors.

=== NEET (PG) 2026 ===
The exam was first announced to be conducted on March 3rd. It was then officially postponed to July 7th due to reasons unknown. Later, NBE made an announcement that the exam is Preponed to June 23rd. Admit cards were released and all arrangements were made for the exam. On June 22nd night at around 10pm, the NBE made an official announcement stating the exam is postponed in view of integrity of the examination. After several weeks, the board finally announced the new date, and conducted the exam in two shifts on August 11th. The students expressed disparity in the level of toughness due to the two shifts. Normalization was undertaken & results were announced. Supreme court cases emerged stating lack of transparency regarding the result, normalization, answer key, etc. This caused a lot of delay in the counselling process.

=== NEET (PG) cutoff revisions ===
In 2023, the Indian Medical Association (IMA) had written to Union Health Ministry seeking reduction in cutoff marks for NEET (PG) 2023 to prevent medical college seats from going vacant. Subsequently, the Union Health Ministry directed the National Medical Commission (NMC) to reduce NEET (PG) qualifying cutoff to zero percentile across all categories, effectively allowing students scoring -13 marks to qualify for counseling which can be as low as -40 for SC/ST category. The same pattern of revision of NEET (PG) cutoff criteria was repeated in 2025 but for 7th percentile down from 50th percentile for General and EWS category, 5th percentile down from 45th percentile for PwD category and zero percentile down from 40th percentile for SC/ST/OBC category, after over 9,000 seats of 65,000 - 70,000 PG medical seats remained vacant even after second round of counseling. The IMA, writing again to the Union Health Ministry warned of doctor shortages, increased workload and its effect on academics and healthcare in the nation. While NBEMS officials clarified that the exam is meant to generate a merit list and not reassess competence of doctors already qualifying MBBS and that admissions will remain merit based, the move has seen sharp criticism from doctors questioning the prioritization of interest of stakeholders of medical education over its effect on quality of healthcare in India, with Dr. Rohan Krishnan, chief patron of a medical fraternity, Federation of All India Medical Association (FAIMA) expressing disappointment in the decision explaining that the move is intended to fill seats in "substandard" private medical colleges that do not fulfill seats due to low interest from higher scoring candidates and also identifying the recently added private medical college seats as a result of confidence in demand due to pattern of lowering of cutoff criteria. Federation of Resident Doctor's Association (FORDA) also opposed the move, claiming that it “undermines meritocracy, transparency and public trust in the medical education system.” Federation of Obstetric and Gynaecological Societies of India (FOGSI) also expressed serious concern about the cutoff revision's effect on healthcare quality and criticized that transparent algorithm for filling vacant seats already set in NEET PG information bulletin must be strictly followed and exhausted before taking such steps. The association also called for lowering of medical fees which it attributed to causing vacancy of seats.

A public interest litigation (PIL) filed by a lawyer challenging NEET (PG) 2023 cutoff revision reached the Supreme Court that while questioning his right to represent the matter, dismissed the plea citing the petitioner for having no locus standi. In 2026, the Supreme Court is hearing petitions challenging the 2025 revisions that it violates Article 14 and Article 21 of the Constitution, and challenges legality and fairness of altering eligibility conditions after the selection process had already begun. Under affidavit issued by NBEMS, it claims no role in the cut-off revision and that it merely acted in compliance of orders from the Union Health Ministry while emphasizing that 95,913 additional qualifying candidates will be affected by any interference and referring to a recent Delhi High Court ruling squashing a public interest litigation challenging the same.

== See also ==
- Medical colleges in India
- National Board of Examinations
- National Eligibility cum Entrance Test (UG)
- National Exit Test
- All India Pre Medical Test – Medical entrance examination
