= Medical education in India =

Medical education

Education in India
Medical Education
- Minister of Health and Family Welfare: Jagat Prakash Nadda

National education budget (2024-25)
- Budget: ₹94,371 crore (US$10 billion)

General details
- Primary languages: English
- System type: National
- Medical Education Start: 1947

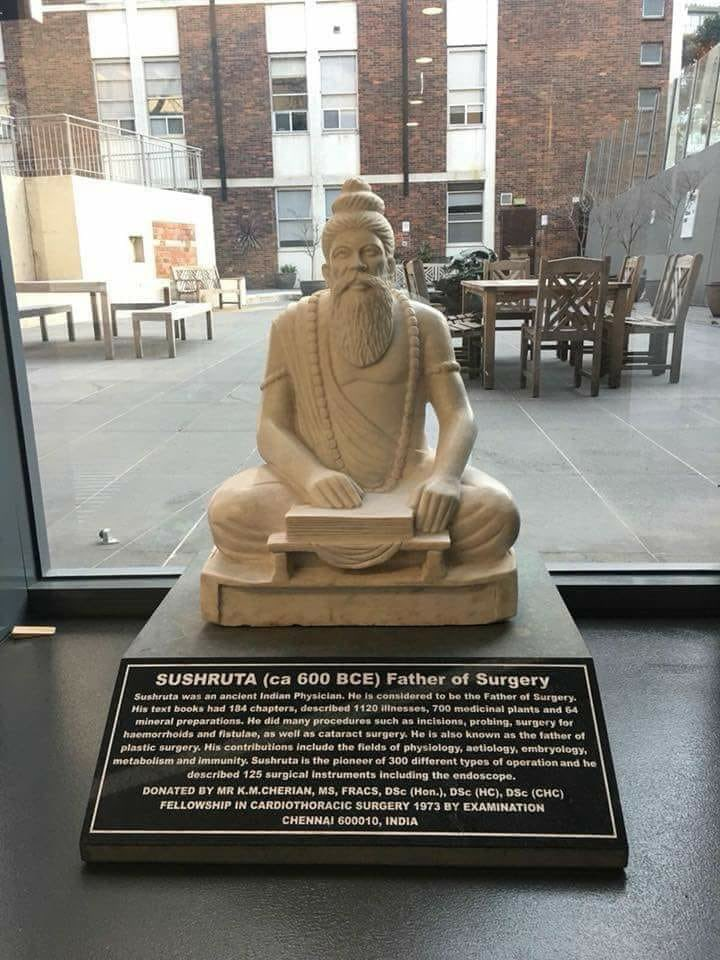
A statue of Sushruta (800 BCE), author of Sushruta Samhita and the founding father of surgery, at Royal Australasian College of Surgeons (RACS) in Melbourne, Australia.

The standard entry-to-practice degree in modern evidence-based medicine in India is the Bachelor of Medicine and Bachelor of Surgery (MBBS). Alternative systems of Medicine in India are Ayurveda (BAMS), Unani (BUMS), Siddha (BSMS) and Homeopathy (BHMS). M.B.B.S. (Bachelor of Medicine and Bachelor of Surgery) a credential earned upon completion of a five-and-a-half-year undergraduate program. The curriculum is divided into one year of preclinical studies in general science subjects and three and a half years of paraclinical and clinical studies, followed by a one-year clinical internship. Before beginning the internship, students are required to pass several examinations, the final one of which is conducted in two parts. Postgraduate education in medical specialties typically takes 3 additional years of study after the MBBS and concludes with the award of a Master of Surgery or Doctor of Medicine (MD). Postgraduate diplomas in medical specialities may also be awarded upon the completion of two-year training programs. After that a person can further get a degree in superspeciality (D.M. or M.Ch.) in his or her respective branch after successful completion of 3 years of superspeciality in a medical college.

India has various ancient systems of medicine that long predate the introduction of modern evidence based medicine during British colonial rule. Ancient Indian system of medicine is referred to as Ayurveda (Science of life). All traditional systems like Ayurveda, Yoga, Naturopathy, Unani, Siddha, and Homeopathy (collectively referred to as AYUSH) are common forms of medical care in India, especially in rural regions. While these forms of medicine also play a major role in India's public health care system along with modern system of medicine and are often practiced informally, practitioners are officially mandated to be licensed by one of the country's 29 state medical councils. Professional degree programs in traditional systems are structured similarly: Credentials like the Bachelor of Ayurveda, Medicine and Surgery (BAMS), the Bachelor of Homeopathic Medicine and Surgery (BHMS) are awarded upon the completion of five-and-a-half-year undergraduate programs. Graduation typically requires passing annual examinations and completing a final one-year clinical internship. Graduate education in medical specialties typically takes three additional year of studies After BAMS And BHMS And conclude with Award of Master of Ayurveda (BAMS MD/MS (AYU)) And Master of Homeopathy (BHMS MD(HOMEO)). In BAMS Postgraduate diplomas in medical specializations may also be awarded upon the completion of two-year training programs.

In terms of oversight, Ayush system of medical Education regulated by a separate ministry CCIM (Central Council Of Indian Medicine) and CCH (Central Council of Homeopathy. Modern system of medicine MCI (Medical Council of India) or the new National Medical Commission.

== Colleges and Universities ==
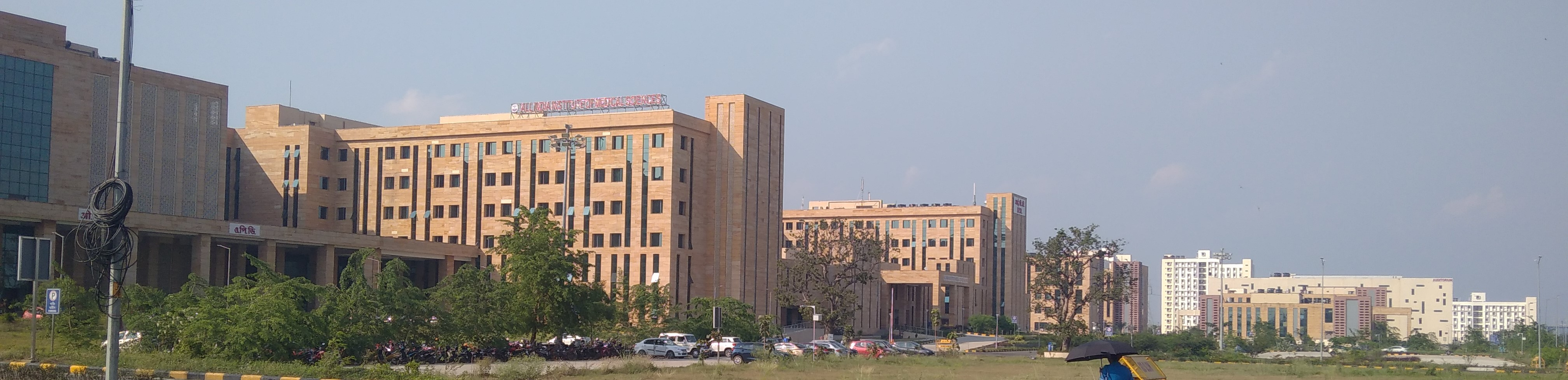
The campus of All India Institute of Medical Sciences, Kalyani.

In India, a medical college is an educational institution that provides medical education. These institutions may vary from stand-alone colleges that train doctors to conglomerates that offer training related in all aspects of medical care. The term is synonymous with "medical school" as used in the US and some other countries. MBBS is a degree in Modern Scientific Medicine established by Indian Medical Council Act 1956 and continued in National Medical Commission Act 2019. After MBBS, they register with state medical councils. Indian law requires these institutions to be recognized by the National Medical Commission. The Indian government keeps an updated list of these approved medical colleges. Many Persons without MBBS degrees practice like doctors in India. They are called quacks. According to National Medical Commission Act 2019, punishment for quackery has been enhanced to up to 1 year imprisonment and up to Rs. 5 lakh fine.

== Admissions ==
Admissions to courses in Medical Colleges of India have been streamlined in the last few years. There criteria vary from one country to other. For example, applicants should be undergraduates when they apply to American universities while they pursue bachelor's degrees when they apply to China medical colleges. The whole admission process is under a major reform with ongoing court cases from parties against it. In general, admission was based on one of the following:

1. Marks obtained in the competitive examinations conducted at central level (NEET)
2. Minimum 50%(for general category) Marks obtained in PCB (P stands for physics, C stands for chemistry and B stands for biology) in the final examinations of Std. XII.
3. Donation/Management based seats.

Similarly for Post-graduate degrees and diplomas (residencies) the competitive examinations conducted at central (NEET) level forms the basis for admission or donation based seats. Specific institutions may also require a personal interview of the candidate but this is more in cases of sub-specialty courses.

These donation based seats have come under heavy criticism because this makes effectively India the only country that authorises, as official policy, the sale of medical seats by private medical colleges, implicitly accepting the principle that the ability to pay, and not merit, is what counts. These illegal capitation fees range from ₹50 lakh (equivalent to ₹64 lakh or US$69,000 in 2026) to ₹2.25 crore (equivalent to ₹2.9 crore or US$310,000 in 2026) for a MBBS seat. For any medical seat a student from general category should minimum have scored 50 percentile in NEET UG to get seat in UG courses. But medical colleges in states like Kerala, require minimum marks / ranks in their respective competitive entrance exams even for the management seats.

In order to reduce stress of multiple examinations and ensuring minimum competence and importantly with the purpose to weed out corruption in medical education across the country NTA-NEET-UG and NEET-PG were first proposed in the Vision 2015 by Board of Governors (BOGs) appointed after by Government of India after dissolution of MCI.NEET examination is a single window for entry into a medical college. Although specifics of implemented NEET for UG and PG courses are different from what was proposed in Vision 2015 document, it has essentially maintained its core purpose.

Entrance examinations were conducted by the following agencies and abolished in 2019:

- AIIMS Entrance Exams – All India Institute of Medical Science
- NEET (National Eligibility cum Entrance Test) - National Testing Agency (NTA)
- JIPMER Entrance Exams – Jawaharlal Institute of Post-graduate Medical Education and Research

=== Undergraduate Admission ===
NTA-NEET (Undergraduate), for MBBS and BDS courses, was conducted in 2013 by the Central Board of Secondary Education (CBSE). NEET-UG replaced the All India Pre Medical Test (AIPMT) and all individual MBBS exams conducted by states or colleges themselves. However, many colleges and institutes took a stay order and conducted private examinations for admission to their MBBS and BDS courses. Nevertheless, many other reputed institutes such as the Armed Forces Medical College and Banaras Hindu University have opted to admit students on the basis of the NEET-UG. The first exam was held on 5 May 2013, and the results were announced on 5 June 2013. In India, there is a huge competition to qualify for an MBBS seat. In NEET-UG 2024, among the registered candidates, a total of 2,406,079 candidates were eligible to appear in the NEET-UG, 2024, out of which 2,333,297 candidates appeared in the test and 1,316,268 candidates qualified the test for 108,915 seats. This makes a 4.52% appearing the exam to securing a seat success rate, and around 2.32% appearing the exam to securing a seat success rate for government medical colleges.

On 18 July 2013 the Indian Supreme Court struck down the NEET exam with a 2:1 decision. The Medical Council of India has appealed for a review in August 2013, in may of 2016 supreme court of India cancelled all medical exams and NEET (UG) and NEET (PG) becomes an only way to get admission in almost all medical colleges of India. From 2019 NEET Examinations are conducted by the National Testing Agency (NTA).

=== Postgraduate Admission ===
Similarly for Post graduation courses (residencies), the NBE NEET (PG) is the most popular eligibility cum entrance examination for MD/MS and post-graduate diploma courses. This effectively replaced the existing AIPGMEE and similar state level exams for entry into post-graduate courses. The first NEET (PG) was conducted by the National Board of Examinations from 23 November – 6 December 2012, which was referred to as the testing window (with 24th, 25th, 28 November and 2 December as non-testing days). The test was a computer-based test unlike the traditional paper and pen based test AIIMS had been conducting over years for admission to 50% all India quota Post graduate courses in the country. In all, 90,377 candidates took the exam.

In addition to NEET-PG, The INI CET (Institute of National Importance Combined Entrance Test) is another significant examination conducted in India for admission to postgraduate medical courses. It is a combined entrance test for MD, MS, MCh (3–6 years), DM (3–6 years), and MDS courses in various Institutes of National Importance (INIs) like AIIMS, JIPMER, PGIMER, and NIMHANS.

The INI CET was introduced to streamline the admission process to these prestigious institutions, replacing the separate entrance exams that were previously conducted by each institute. The INI CET is conducted twice a year, typically in January and July sessions.

This examination is computer-based and consists of multiple-choice questions that cover a wide range of topics related to the medical field. The INI CET is known for its high standards and competition, as it opens doors to well sought-after postgraduate medical programs in India. Candidates who score well in the INI CET are eligible for admission to various specialties in the participating INIs, making it a normal step for those pursuing advanced medical education.

=== Superspeciality Course Admission ===
Similarly for Superspeciality courses (residencies), the NBE NEET (SS) is the most popular eligibility cum entrance examination for DM/MCh. This successfully replaced other exams conducted for superspeciality course admission. In addition to NEET-SS, another important examination for post-graduate medical courses in India is the INI-SS (Institute of National Importance Super Specialty) exam. The INI-SS is conducted for admission to various DM, MCh, and MD (Hospital Administration) courses in prestigious institutes like AIIMS, JIPMER, PGIMER, and NIMHANS, which are designated as Institutes of National Importance (INIs).

The INI-SS exam is held twice a year and is designed to select candidates for super-specialty programs. It is a computer-based test, much like the NEET-PG, and includes questions that assess candidates' knowledge and aptitude for advanced medical and surgical training. This exam is considered the most competitive and challenging in the medical field due to the high standards and limited seats available in the INIs.

=== Admission for Foreign nationals ===
Apart AIIMS non-resident Indian and person of Indian origin (NRI) quotas in different government as well as private colleges, Government of India has also allocated a number of seats for students from developing countries where facilities for medical education are either inadequate. The exact number and country-based allocation of these reserved seats may vary annually.

Students seeking admission to the reserved seats are required to apply through the Indian missions abroad or through the diplomatic missions of the respective countries in India. The Indian Embassy or High Commission in a country will be able to provide more information on request. The requirement for an entrance is usually waived for such sponsored candidates.

Its important to note that foreign nationals wishing to take seats through NRI quota should still qualify through NEET (at least for all government colleges) and seats will be allotted on merit in that quota from all the NRI candidates eligible. The fee structure for NRI candidates is also different.

== Licensure ==
India follows a semi-centralized licensure model regulated by the National Medical Commission, with registration executed through State Medical Councils. Once registered with a State Medical Council, the practitioner is automatically included in the Indian Medical Register maintained under the NMC framework. This registation permits the holder to practice medicine anywhere in India.

== Undergraduate Education ==
=== MBBS ===
A medical college offers graduate degree Bachelor of Medicine and Bachelor of Surgery (MBBS). Only institutions offering MBBS course in its curriculum are referred to as a Medical Colleges. The college may teach Post Graduate as well as Paramedical courses. The admission to government MBBS programs is highly competitive.

The MBBS program starts with the learnings in basic pre and para-clinical subjects such as biochemistry, physiology, anatomy, microbiology, pathology and pharmacology. The students simultaneously obtain hands-on training in the wards and out-patient departments, where they interact with real patients for five years. The curriculum aims to inculcate standard protocols of history taking, examination, differential diagnosis and Complete patient Management. The student is taught to determine what investigations will be useful for a patient and what are the best treatment options. The curriculum also contains a thorough practical knowledge and practice of performing standard clinical procedures. The course also contains a 12-month-long internship, in which an intern is rotated across various specialties. Besides standard clinical care, one also gets a thorough experience of ward management, staff management and thorough counselling skills.

The degree awarded is "Bachelor of Medicine and Bachelor of Surgery". The minimum requirements for the MBBS course are 50% marks in physics, chemistry, biology and English in the '10+2' examinations. For reserved category students the requirement is 40%. MBBS admissions are not centralised. The admission requirements differ across universities. Generally, students who attain higher marks in the qualifying examinations and in the Medical Entrance examinations conducted by various agencies are accepted onto the MBBS course.

==== I (First) MBBS ====
The pre-clinical course consists of Anatomy, Physiology and Biochemistry, and these are the basic subjects of medical students and it lasts for a year. Prior to 1997 the I MBBS consisted of 1½ years, but this was trimmed to make more time available for clinical exposure. Passing the I MBBS final examination is mandatory to proceed with the course. A candidate failing the first MBBS examination is detained until all the 1st MBBS subjects are cleared. However the MCI has changed this in regulations on graduate medical education 2012. In many universities if one does not clear a subject that student will get into an intermediate batch. It is a severe drawback. Morning session usually consist of an Anatomy lecture followed by dissection, except for one day when a class in biostatistics may be taken. Afternoon sessions consist of a theory class followed by laboratory work in Physiology or Biochemistry or it may be histology branch of anatomy.

==== II (Second) MBBS ====
Pathology, Pharmacology, Microbiology, and Forensic Medicine for one and half years. After clearing all the four subjects a student advances to III MBBS. The lecture classes and lab work of these subjects are usually held in the afternoons to enable students to attend the clinical wards and out patient departments in the mornings. These are followed by Short postings (15days duration) in Pediatrics, Psychiatry, Forensic medicine, Skin & Leprosy,& Respiratory medicine & TB. This may be followed directly by major postings or a clinical posting in Community Medicine may intervene.

==== III (Final) MBBS – Part I ====
Part I consists of one year, where Social and Preventive Medicine (Community Medicine), Ear Nose and Throat and Ophthalmology form the core subjects.

==== III (Final) MBBS – Part II ====
One year of focused training in the four basic clinical subjects, namely: Medicine, Surgery (incl. Orthopaedics), Paediatrics, Obstetrics & Gynaecology. On passing the final MBBS examination, a candidate is awarded provisional registration by the MCI or the State medical council and can start the internship. Permanent registration (license to practice) and the final Medical degree (i.e., MBBS) is given only after successful and satisfactory completion of the Compulsory Rotating Medical Internship.

==== Internship ====
After successful completion of the MBBS course, one has to compulsorily work in the hospital attached to the medical college or in any other approved hospital allowed in some medical colleges, for a period of one year. This posting is called the Compulsory Rotating Medical Internship or the House Surgeon in Kerala/Tamil Nadu. The student gets the degree only after satisfactory completion of their internship. Interns are posted in all clinical departments of the hospital on a rotation basis, receiving basic clinical and practical knowledge about all the disciplines of medicine to make the medical graduate fit to work in the community as a General Physician. The schedules of an intern is usually extremely exhaustive. For example, one may have to work for the whole night and then have to start the next day duty only after about one or two hours. This may last till the afternoon. 24-hour sleepless duty at a stretch is not uncommon and sometimes the scheduled breaks are also not allowed by the superiors. The intern is also paid a monthly stipend for work at the hospital, which differs in different medical colleges on the basis of the management. The person is licensed to practice medicine only after completion of this internship. And only after finishing internship, one can receive his MBBS degree and can pursue postgraduate studies.

Post-internship, some graduates may choose to work in different medical specialities and are often referred to as House Officers or House Physicians or House Surgeons. This is different from postgraduate training and does not lead to award of a degree. A doctor undergoing higher speciality training is referred to as a "post-graduate trainee" or simply a PGT. House Physicians, PGTs and interns are also called junior doctors across Indian hospitals. PGTs and House Officers are sometimes referred to as Junior Residents. After completion of postgraduate work, doctors may enter subspeciality training and are then known as "post-doctoral trainees" or simply PDTs. They are also called as senior residents at some institutes.

==== Residency ====
The Internship is different from House Officership (which may follow Internship), as understood in UK and other countries. The latter is not a compulsory tenure. The House Physician or House Surgeon, unlike an Intern, works in a particular department of his or her choice and is paid a monthly 'salary' for his work in the hospital (especially, in the UK). The American counterpart is simply called a "Resident" (i.e., a Resident Physician or a Resident Surgeon). The entire period of residency in India can be very demanding, both physically and psychologically. The Maharashtra Association of Resident Doctors (MARD) had filed a complaint with the Maharashtra Human Rights Commission (MHRC) regarding resident doctors being made to work for more than 30 hours at a stretch. There have been instances of doctor suicides due to stress and burnout. Institutions have been criticised for lack of hygienic food supply to resident doctors and their shabby living conditions.

=== Alternative Medicine ===
Ayurveda, Yoga & Naturopathy, Unani, Siddha Homeopathy are collectively called as AYUSH – Alternative medicine.

- B.A.M.S., Bachelor of Ayurvedic Medicine and Surgery followed by M.D.
- B.H.M.S., Bachelor of Homeopathic Medicine & Surgery followed by M.D.
- B.N.Y.S., Bachelor of Naturopathy & Yogic Sciences followed by M.D.
- B.S.M.S., Bachelor of Siddha Medicine and Surgery followed by M.D.
- B.U.M.S., Bachelor of Unani Medine and Surgery followed by M.D.

=== Other Undergraduate courses ===
- BSc in Nursing
- BSc in Medical Lab Technology
- BSc in Speech Therapy
- BSc in Neurology
- B.P.T (Physiotherapy)
- [B.O.T] (Occupational Therapy)
- B.D.S, (Dental Surgery)

=== Pharmacy ===
1. B.Pharma

== Postgraduate Education ==
=== Speciality degrees and residency ===
After completing M.B.B.S. (Bachelor of Medicine, Bachelor of Surgery) and obtaining a valid medical license which is the primary medical qualification in India, physicians can pursue postgraduate medical education to pursue specialisation in various specialities. The system is based on degree-cum-residency model.

Postgraduate medical training operates on a residency model, where trainees are officially referred as residents or junior residents. The residents live and work full-time in an academic college or hospital and are paid stipends.

Candidates pursuing postgraduate medical education in India are selected through two major entrance examinations: NEET (PG), conducted by the National Board of Examinations (NBE) for admission to general medical colleges across the country, and INI-CET, conducted by AIIMS New Delhi for admission to Institutes of National Importance (INIs). Afterwards the candidates are matched into various residencies primarily on the basis of merit and choice. Candidates opting for medical specialities are enrolled in Doctor of Medicine (M.D.) course and candidates opting for surgical specialities are enrolled in Master of Surgery (M.S.) course, both being 3-year courses.

List of medical specialities
Subject	Degree	Category
Anesthesiology	Doctor of Medicine (M.D.)	Core Clinical
General medicine	Doctor of Medicine (M.D.)	Core Clinical
Cardiology	Doctor of Medicine (M.D.)	Core Clinical
Neurology	Doctor of Medicine (M.D.)	Core Clinical
Oncology	Doctor of Medicine (M.D.)	Core Clinical
Pediatrics	Doctor of Medicine (M.D.)	Core Clinical
Endocrinology	Doctor of Medicine (M.D.)	Core Clinical
Psychiatry	Doctor of Medicine (M.D.)	Core Clinical
Urology	Doctor of Medicine (M.D.)	Core Clinical
Immunology	Doctor of Medicine (M.D.)	Core Clinical
Gastroenterology	Doctor of Medicine (M.D.)	Core Clinical
Dermatology, Venereology and Leprosy	Doctor of Medicine (M.D.)	Core Clinical
Pulmonology	Doctor of Medicine (M.D.)	Core Clinical
Family medicine	Doctor of Medicine (M.D.)	Core Clinical
Emergency medicine	Doctor of Medicine (M.D.)	Core Clinical
Nuclear medicine	Doctor of Medicine (M.D.)	Core Clinical
Sports medicine	Doctor of Medicine (M.D.)	Core Clinical
Diagnostic Radiology	Doctor of Medicine (M.D.)	Core Clinical
Radiation oncology	Doctor of Medicine (M.D.)	Core Clinical
Physical medicine and rehabilitation	Doctor of Medicine (M.D.)	Core Clinical
Community medicine	Doctor of Medicine (M.D.)	Laboratory & Allied
Laboratory medicine	Doctor of Medicine (M.D.)	Laboratory & Allied
Pathology	Doctor of Medicine (M.D.)	Laboratory & Allied
Haematology	Doctor of Medicine (M.D.)	Laboratory & Allied
Forensic medicine	Doctor of Medicine (M.D.)	Laboratory & Allied
Microbiology	Doctor of Medicine (M.D.)	Laboratory & Allied
Biochemistry	Doctor of Medicine (M.D.)	Laboratory & Allied
Pharmacology	Doctor of Medicine (M.D.)	Laboratory & Allied
Geriatric medicine	Doctor of Medicine (M.D.)	Basic Medical Sciences
Anatomy	Doctor of Medicine (M.D.)	Basic Medical Sciences
Physiology	Doctor of Medicine (M.D.)	Basic Medical Sciences
Palliative medicine	Doctor of Medicine (M.D.)	Basic Medical Sciences
Aerospace medicine	Doctor of Medicine (M.D.)	Basic Medical Sciences

List of surgical specialities
Speciality	Degree
Cardiothoracic surgery	Master of Surgery (M.S.)
General surgery	Master of Surgery (M.S.)
Neurosurgery	Master of Surgery (M.S.)
Gynaecology	Master of Surgery (M.S.)
Otolaryngology (ENT)	Master of Surgery (M.S.)
Orthopaedic surgery	Master of Surgery (M.S.)
Pediatric surgery	Master of Surgery (M.S.)
Plastic surgery	Master of Surgery (M.S.)
Vascular surgery	Master of Surgery (M.S.)
Ophthalmology	Master of Surgery (M.S.)
Surgical oncology	Master of Surgery (M.S.)
Trauma surgery	Master of Surgery (M.S.)
Endocrine surgery	Master of Surgery (M.S.)
Urology	Master of Surgery (M.S.)
Podiatry	Master of Surgery (M.S.)
Oral and Maxillofacial Surgery	Master of Dental Surgery (M.D.S.)

=== Super speciality residency ===
Super speciality training and education is the highest tier of formal clinical education in India. Candidates seeking super-speciality training may do so either directly after completing M.B.B.S via 6-year integrated course or after obtaining a postgraduate qualification, such as Doctor of Medicine (M.D.) or Master of Surgery (M.S.) through a 3-year course.

Candidates pursuing super-speciality training are allotted either the Doctorate of Medicine (DM) course for medical disciplines or the Master of Chirurgiae (MCh) course for surgical disciplines. Admission and residency placement are determined through two main examinations — NEET-SS, conducted for general medical colleges across India, and INI-SS, conducted for the Institutes of National Importance (INIs). Additionally, candidates who have completed only MBBS may gain entry into direct 6-year DM/MCh programs offered by some INIs through the INI-CET examination.

Candidates undergoing super-speciality training follow a structured residency system and are designated as Senior resident(s), receiving a monthly stipend from their respective teaching hospitals.

==== List of surgical sub specialities ====
- Neurosurgery
  - Neuro oncology
  - Vascular neurosurgery
  - Spinal surgery
  - Skull base surgery
  - Pediatric neurosurgery
  - Endoscopic & minimally invasive surgery
  - Epilepsy surgery
  - Functional and movement disorder surgery
  - Neuro trauma and neurocritical care
  - Stereotactic radiosurgery
- Cardiothoracic surgery
  - Pediatric cardiac surgery
  - Thoracic surgery
  - Robotic & minimally invasive surgery
  - Adult cardiac surgery
  - Heart transplant and mechanical circulatory support
- Orthopaedic surgery
  - Arthroplasty
  - Orthopaedic trauma
  - Hand & upper extremity surgery
  - Paediatric orthopedics
  - Reconstructive orthopedics

== Doctoral and Post Doctorate ==
Post-doctoral fellowship courses in Neuro-radiology, Neuro or Cardiac anesthesiology, etc. are offered by select institutions.

=== Doctoral/Fellowship ===
- Doctor of Philosophy (PhD)
- Pharm D, Doctor of Pharmacy

=== Post Doctorate ===
- Postdoctoral researcher
- Post-doctoral degree

== Brain Drain ==
India has been one of the most important source country of medical doctors for the advanced countries since the 1960s. High academic pressure and limited institutional mental health support have been cited as contributing factors to dissatisfaction among Indian medical students, potentially influencing decisions to seek training or work abroad. An estimated total of 20,315 emigrated Indian physicians and 22,786 Indian nurses were working in the OECD countries in the year 2000. With 59,523 physicians of Indian origin working in the English speaking Western world (the US, UK, Australia and Canada combined) in 2004, India had become by far the single largest source of emigrated physicians in the world. Indian Physician Dr Edmond Fernandes called for engaging doctors beyond medicine and building them holistically to strengthen Indian medical education.

== See also ==
- Education in India
- List of Indian inventions and discoveries
