= Gadag Institute of Medical Sciences =

K. H. Patil Institute of Medical Sciences
- Other name: Gadag Medical College
- Former name: Gadag Institute of Medical Sciences
- Motto: "ಸರ್ವೇಜನೋ ಆರೋಗ್ಯಂ ಭವತು"
- Motto in English: Sarvejano Arogyam Bhavathu
- Type: Government
- Established: 2013; 13 years ago
- Affiliations: National Medical Commission, WHO, Paramedical Board Bengaluru
- Academic affiliations: Rajiv Gandhi University of Health Sciences
- Budget: INR 400 crores
- Director: Dr. Basavaraj P. Bommanahalli
- Undergraduates: 150 (M.B.B.S), 100 (BSc Nursing), 70 (BSc Allied Health Sciences), 280 (paramedics) per year
- Postgraduates: 35 (MD, MS, CPS, DNB)
- Location: GIMS Campus, State Highway 6, Mallasamudra, Gadag, Karnataka, 582103, India; 15.3786°N 75.6021°E
- Campus: District Hospital, Gadag
- Language: English, Kannada
- Website: karunadu.karnataka.gov.in/gimsgadag/Pages/Home.aspx

K. H. Patil Institute of Medical Sciences is an Indian government medical college. It is located in Mallasamudra village of Gadag, Karnataka, India. The institution is affiliated with Rajiv Gandhi University of Health Sciences and offers courses for medical, paramedical and nursing students. It is renamed to K. H. Patil Institute of Medical Sciences on 17 March 2025 by the then chief minister Siddaramaiah in the honour of K. H. Patil.

== Affiliated Teaching Hospitals ==
Affiliated Teaching hospitals with the institution are:

- Government District Teaching Hospital Gadag
- Dundappa Manvi Maternal and Child Health Care Hospital, K.C. Rani Road, Gadag
- Urban Health Training Centre, Gandhi Circle, Gadag
- Primary Health Centre, Hulkoti
- Primary Health Centre, Nagavi
- Shirahatti Taluk Hospital, Shirahatti
- Lakshmeshwar Taluk Hospital, Laxmeshwar

== UG / PG Courses Offered by the Institute ==
=== Undergraduate courses ===
The college offers four-and-a-half-year M.B.B.S courses with a one-year Compulsory Rotating Medical Internship at the above mentioned Affiliated Teaching hospitals.

Undergraduate courses include M.B.B.S, Bachelor of Science in Allied Health Sciences, Bachelor of Science in Nursing and Diploma in Nursing.

=== Postgraduate courses ===
Gadag Institute of Medical Sciences is the only college overseen by the National Board of Examinations to offer a Post-graduate DNB course in surgery in Karnataka.

The institute is the only medical college in India to obtain post-graduate seats in its all clinical departments within five years of its inception.

Admission is coordinated through PG NEET conducted by DNB, India.

Post-graduate courses including MD, MS, DNB, and CPS are offered.

== Departments ==
- Anatomy
- Physiology
- Biochemistry
- Pharmacology
- Pathology
- Microbiology
- Forensic medicine
- Community Medicine
- General medicine
- Pediatric
- TB and Chest
- Skin & V D
- Psychiatry
- General surgery - The college is presently permitted by the Indian government to run a DNB course in surgery. This is the first post-graduate course to be offered.
- Orthopedics
- ENT
- Ophthalmology
- OBG
- Anesthesia
- Radiology
- Dentistry
