= Tata Main Hospital, Jamshedpur =

Multispecialty teaching hospital in Jamshedpur, Jharkhand, India

Tata Main Hospital
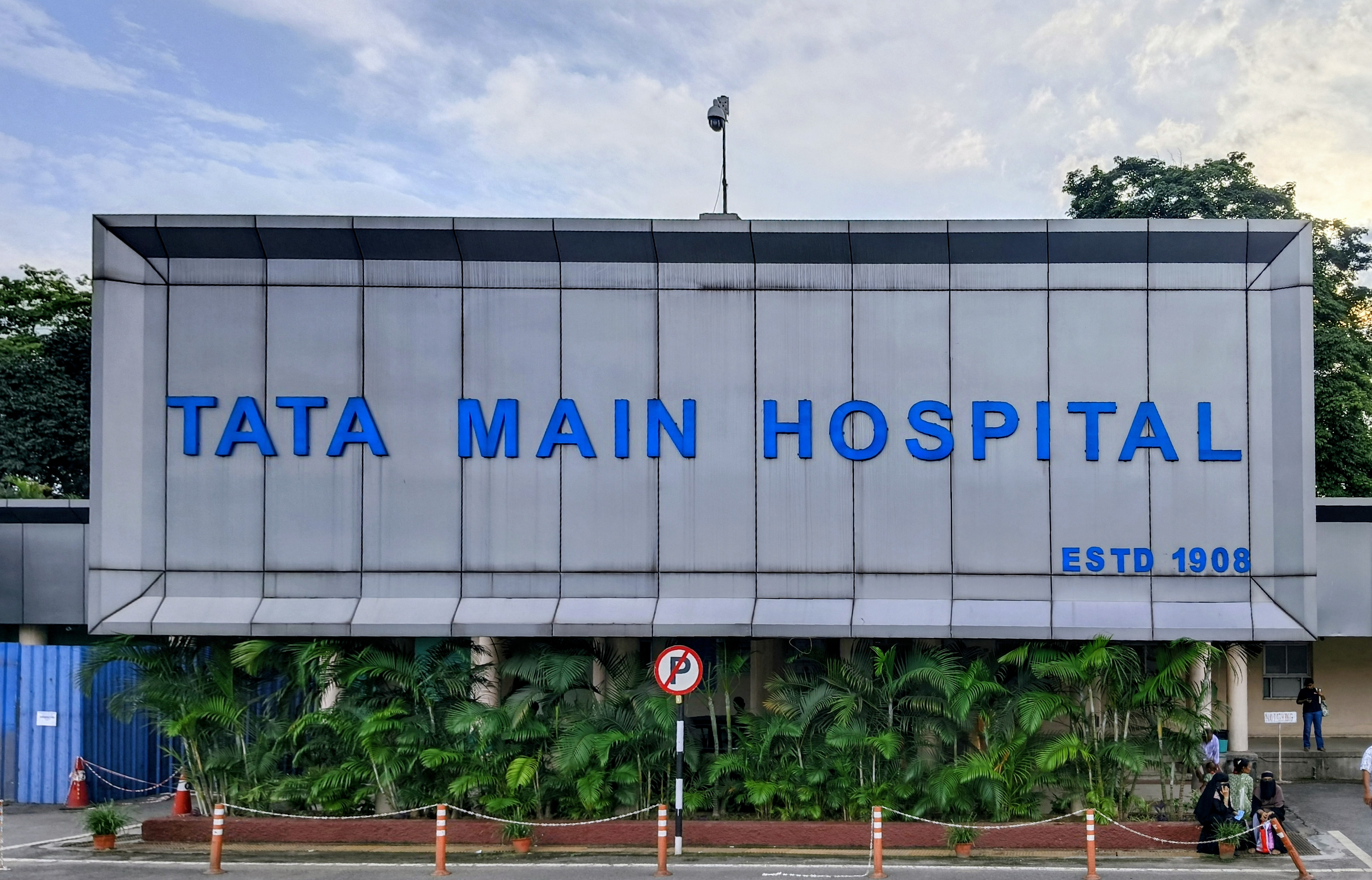
- Tata Main Hospital, Jamshedpur

Geography
- Location: C Road West, Northern Town, Bistupur, Jamshedpur, Jharkhand, India

Organisation
- Care system: Private
- Type: General

Services
- Emergency department: Yes
- Beds: 983

History
- Founded: 1908

Links
- Website: www.tatamainhospital.com
- Lists: Hospitals in India

Tata Main Hospital (TMH), Jamshedpur is a multi-specialty teaching hospital located in Bistupur, Jamshedpur, Jharkhand, India. Established in 1908, the hospital was developed as part of the healthcare infrastructure for employees of Tata Steel and has since expanded to provide tertiary medical services to the wider population of Jamshedpur and surrounding regions.

== Clinical services ==
The hospital provides outpatient services, Emergency care, and a comprehensive range of specialist and super-speciality services.

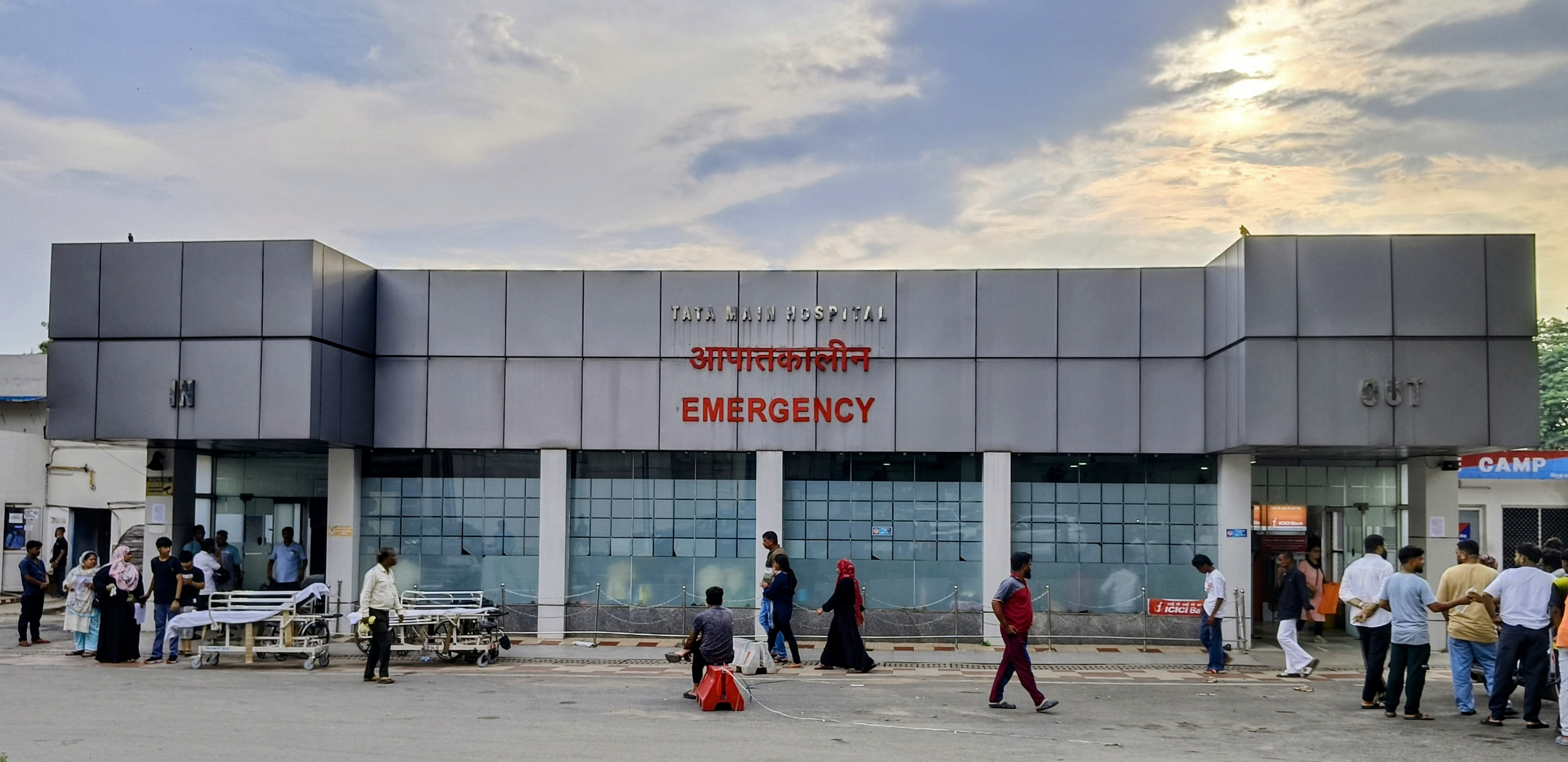
TMH Emergency Department

== Academics ==
TMH functions as a teaching hospital for the MBBS programme of Manipal-Tata Medical College, Jamshedpur, and is recognised by the National Board of Examinations in Medical Sciences (NBEMS) for postgraduate Diplomate of National Board (DNB) training in General Medicine, General Surgery, Obstetrics and Gynaecology, Paediatrics, Orthopaedics, Emergency Medicine, Otorhinolaryngology (ENT), Ophthalmology, Anaesthesiology, and Pathology. It is also recognised for Doctorate of National Board (DrNB) super-speciality training in Cardiology, Neurosurgery, Neonatology, and Critical Care Medicine.

== Accreditation ==
Tata Main Hospital is accredited by the National Accreditation Board for Hospitals & Healthcare Providers.

In 2025, its organ transplant licence was renewed by the Jharkhand state organ transplant advisory council, as reported by The Times of India.
