= Deen Dayal Upadhyay Hospital =

- Directorate General of Health Services, Government of NCT of Delhi
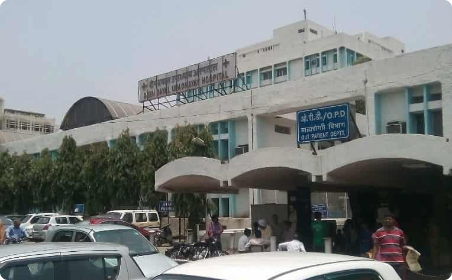

Geography
- Location: Hari Nagar, West Delhi, New Delhi, Delhi, India

Organisation
- Care system: Public
- Type: District / tertiary care hospital
- Affiliated university: Government medical colleges (Delhi)

Services
- Emergency department: Yes
- Beds: 640

History
- Founded: 1970; 56 years ago

Links
- Website: https://dduh.delhi.gov.in/en
- Lists: Hospitals in India

Deen Dayal Upadhyay Hospital (commonly abbreviated as DDU Hospital) is a government-run multi-specialty tertiary care hospital located in Hari Nagar, West Delhi, India. It is operated by the Government of the National Capital Territory (NCT) of Delhi. and provides emergency, inpatient, outpatient, diagnostic and specialist services to residents of West Delhi and neighbouring areas.

This 650+ bed hospital deals with around 5,000 patients daily on an OPD basis and admits three times its bed strength. The hospital also acts as the first referral centre for the 10,000 odd prisoners lodged in Tihar Jail.

== History ==
Deen Dayal Upadhyay Hospital was established in 1970 as a 50-bed district hospital to serve the growing population of West Delhi. The hospital was progressively expanded, increasing capacity to about 500 beds by the late 1980s and commissioning a trauma block in 2008 which further increased bed strength to 640 beds. The casualty (emergency) services became round-the-clock in 1998. During the 2020 Covid crisis, it was a major center for Covid Care.

== Administration and governance ==
The hospital is administered under the Directorate General of Health Services (DGHS), Government of NCT of Delhi, and functions as a fully state-funded public hospital.

== Facilities and infrastructure ==
DDU Hospital is a multi-storey facility that includes:

- Outpatient departments (OPD) with scheduled registration counters.
- A 24-hour casualty/emergency department and a dedicated trauma block commissioned in 2008.
- Intensive Care Unit (ICUs), operation theatres, diagnostic laboratories, radiology/imaging services and pharmacy services.
- Blood transfusion / regional blood centre facilities (listed in hospital contacts and manuals).
- Dialysis Center & Kidney Care
- Oxygen Plant
- Cancer Care Centre (District-level & Day care)

== Teaching and training ==
DDU Hospital supports medical education, internships and paramedical and nursing training programs in coordination with government medical colleges and training institutes in Delhi; it also hosts continuing medical education (CME) activities and departmental teaching. It is a major center for DNB education and offers many specialities for Post-Graduate DNB Diploma studies.

== See also ==
- Healthcare in India
- List of hospitals in Delhi
