= Shri Vinoba Bhave Civil Hospital =

Hospital in India

Coordinates: 20°16′15″N 73°00′28″E

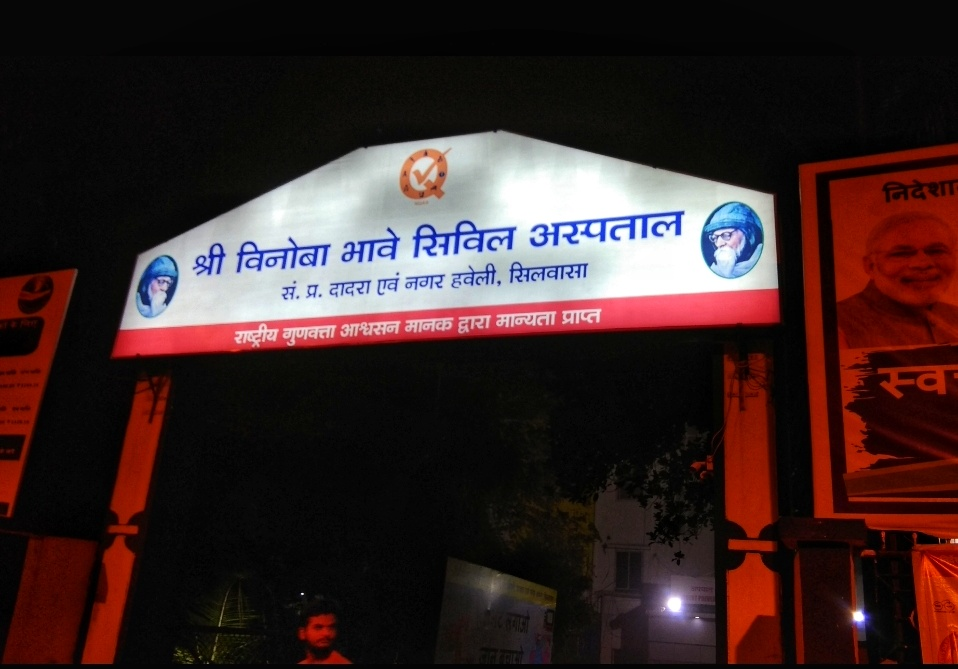
Main gate of the hospital

NAMO Hospital, Silvassa formerly Shree Vinoba Bhave Civil Hospital (VBCH) / Cottage Hospital is a government multi-speciality hospital located in Silvassa, Dadra and Nagar Haveli and Daman and Diu, India.

It is the largest specialty hospital in Dadra and Nagar Haveli and Daman and Diu, catering to the population of the union territory and the adjoining areas of Gujarat and Maharashtra for their curative, preventive and rehabilitation needs. Virtually free-of-cost services are provided to the underprivileged sections of the society and with a daily OPD of circa 3500 patients, the hospital treats over 1 million out-patients annually.

The Hospital is an NQAS-certified hospital, by the Union Ministry of Health. It acts as the tertiary centre for all public health centres throughout Dadra and Nagar Haveli.

== History ==
Earlier known as Cottage Hospital, it was established in 1952 with the aim to provide affordable and comprehensive medical care to the residents of the Union Territory, with the prime focus on weaker sections in rural areas.

After renovation it was renamed as "Shri Vinoba Bhave Civil Hospital" after Vinoba Bhave, who is considered as National Teacher of India and the spiritual successor of Mahatma Gandhi, and re-dedicated to the people on 1 June 1999.

The hospital recently underwent a massive upgrade with construction of a new state-of-the-art building which was inaugurated by the honorable Prime Minister Shri Narendra Modi in the year 2024, and renamed to NAMO Hospital.

== Facilities ==
The hospital is equipped with:-

- 316 beds (out of which 40 are for high-risk patients)
- Accident Prevention cum Trauma and Emergency Medical Services

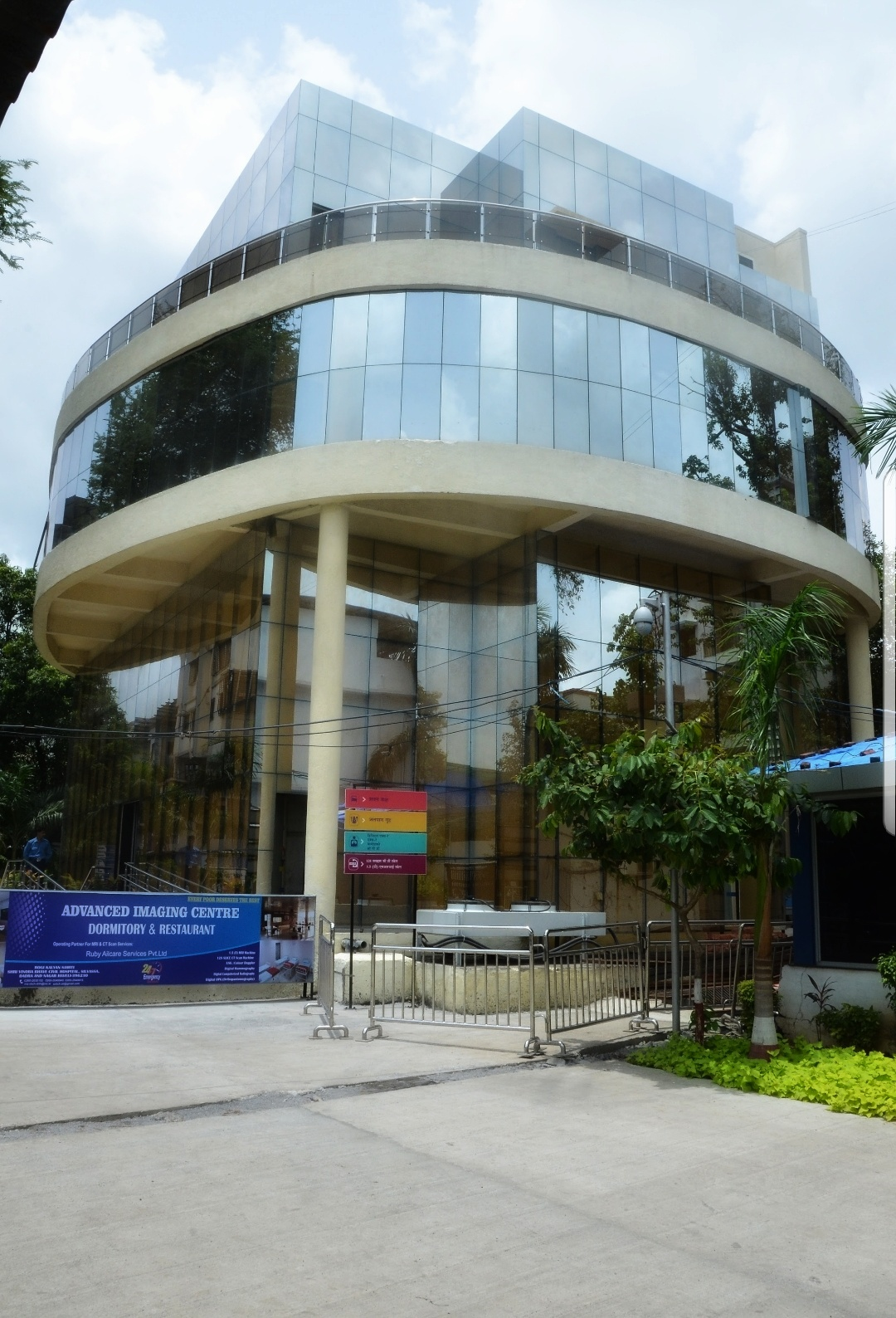
Advanced Imaging Centre

- 6 Operation theatres with 4-bedded casualties
- 16 bedded ICU
- 22 bedded NICU
- 2 bedded Step-down ICU
- 3 bedded ISO-ICU
- Advanced Imaging Centre (with 128-slice CT, 1.5 T MRI machines, four Ultrasound machines with Lithotripsy center and modern Digital X-ray machines)
- Dialysis Center (8 unit)
- Physiotherapy Center
- Ambulance Service (Cardiac Ambulance Service)
- Mobile Medical Unit
- Telemedicine Center
- Free Pharmacy.

A multi-storey building is under development in the hospital campus which will result in upgradation of capacity to 650 beds, so as to cater to the ever-increasing population in the territory.

== Awards and accolades ==
- First Prize for Safe Delivery among all Small States
- Best In-Patient Service Award
- 2nd Prize for Best In-Patient & Surgical Services among all Small States
- Best TB Control Program among Union Territories.
- Swasth Bharat Yatra Award for Best State (Special Mention).

== Medical education ==
The Central Government has set up a Medical College named NAMO Medical Education and Research Institute in the vicinity of the hospital. The foundation stone was laid by the Honourable Prime Minister of India Shri Narendra Modi on 19 January 2019.

The first batch of 150 students for MBBS undergraduate course commenced on 16 August 2019. The college is affiliated to Veer Narmad South Gujarat University.

=== Postgraduate Medical Education ===
Since 2016, the hospital has been imparting medical postgraduate training to doctors through Diploma courses in various specialities, recognized by the College of Physicians & Surgeons of Mumbai. Since 2020, the hospital started with DNB broadspeciality course in various branches

== Shri Vinoba Bhave College of Nursing ==
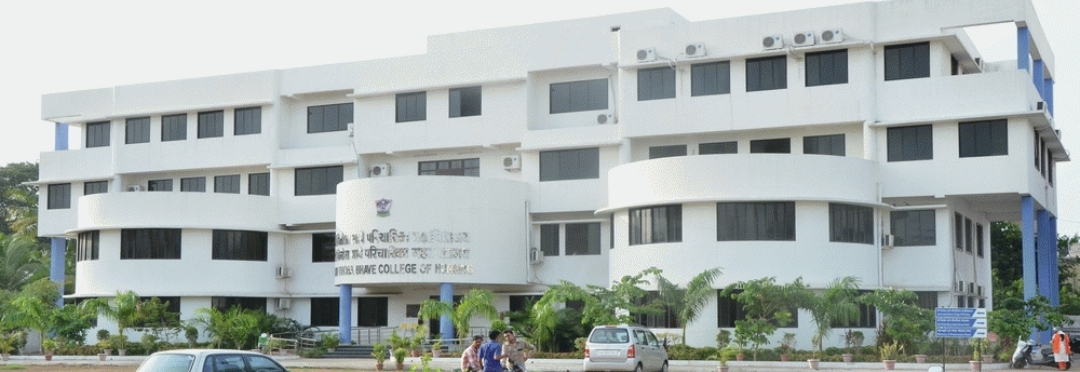
Nursing College

Shri Vinoba Bhave Civil Hospital established a School of Nursing in 2008. In 2013, it was upgraded to College of Nursing, with a yearly intake of 40 Students for its B.Sc nursing course, increasing to 60 in 2016. An M.Sc course was initiated in 2016 with an annual intake of 20 students. The courses are recognized by the Indian Nursing Council, Gujarat Nursing Council and the College is affiliated to Veer Narmad South Gujarat University, Surat.
