= Manipal-Tata Medical College, Jamshedpur =

Medical College in Jharkhand, India

Manipal-Tata Medical College
- Type: Private
- Established: 2020; 6 years ago
- Affiliations: Manipal Academy of Higher Education, NMC
- Dean: Dr. Harish Chander Bandhu
- Director: Dr. Rajiva Dwivedi
- Students: Totals: MBBS - 200
- Location: Kadani Road, Jamshedpur, Jharkhand
- Website: https://manipal.edu/mtmc-jamshedpur.html

Manipal-Tata Medical College, Jamshedpur, established in 2020, is a private medical college located in Jamshedpur, Jharkhand. It is one of the first medical colleges in private-private partnerships in India. Manipal-Tata Medical College is affiliated with Tata Main Hospital, Jamshedpur for (MBBS) courses and has an annual intake capacity of 200.

Apart from MBBS, MTMC also offers B.Sc. and M.Sc. programs in Allied Health Sciences (AHS), in accordance with the National Commission of Allied Healthcare Professions. The AHS programs are offered in Cardiovascular Technology, Clinical Psychology, Medical Laboratory Technology, Medical Imaging Technology, Renal Replacement Therapy & Dialysis Technology, Exercise & Sports Sciences, Health Information Management and Optometry under the aegis of Manipal College for Health Professions, Manipal Academy of Higher Learning, Manipal - 576104, Karnataka, India. The college is affiliated with the Manipal Academy of Higher Education and recognized by the National Medical Commission.

== See also ==
- List of hospitals in India
