= Dr. Babasaheb Ambedkar Medical College and Hospital =

Medical college in New Delhi, India

Dr. Baba Saheb Ambedkar Medical College and Hospital
- Main hall
- Other names: BSAMCH; BSA Medical College, Delhi
- Type: Medical college and hospital
- Established: 6 June 2016; 10 years ago
- Affiliations: National Medical Commission
- Academic affiliations: Guru Gobind Singh Indraprastha University
- Director-Principal: Dr. Suresh Kumar
- Location: Rohini, New Delhi, India
- Campus: Urban
- Website: bsamch.ac.in

Dr. Baba Saheb Ambedkar Medical College and Hospital is a medical college and hospital located in Rohini, Delhi, India. The college is recognized by National Medical Commission and is affiliated with the Guru Gobind Singh Indraprastha University. The selection to the college is done on the basis of merit through NEET (UG). This college is associated with the 540-bedded Dr. Baba Saheb Ambedkar Hospital.

== Courses ==
Dr. Baba Saheb Ambedkar Medical College and Hospital undertakes the education and training of students in MBBS courses. Every year 125 Medical Students are admitted through the National eligibility Cum Entrance Test UG [NEET UG] through State Quota and All India Quota.
