= National Eligibility cum Entrance Test (Undergraduate) =

Medical Entrance Exam in India

- Acronym: NEET (UG)
- Type: Computer Based Test (from 2027)
- Administrator: National Testing Agency: Central Board of Secondary Education (2013–2018); National Testing Agency (2019–present)
- Skills tested: Zoology, Botany, Chemistry and Physics
- Purpose: Admission to undergraduate Medical courses in Central and State government and private colleges all over India. Qualification mandatory for pursuing the same abroad.
- Year started: 2013 except 2014 and 2015 (except 2014 & 2015, when AIPMT was conducted instead.); Preceded by AIPMT
- Duration: 180 minutes
- Score range: -180 to +720
- Score validity: 1 year (India); 3 years (abroad)
- Offered: Once a year
- Restrictions on attempts: unlimited attempts
- Regions: India
- Languages: Assamese; Bengali; English; Gujarati; Hindi; Kannada; Marathi; Oriya; Tamil; Telugu; Urdu; Malayalam
- Annual number of test takers: ▼1,999,895 (2026)
- Fee: ₹1,700 (US$18) for General candidates; ₹1,600 (US$17) for General-EWS/OBC-NCL (Central List) candidates; ₹1,000 (US$10) for SC/ST/PwD/Third Gender candidates
- Used by: Medical schools in India; Veterinary colleges in India; Colleges offering courses in alternative medicine
- Qualification rate: 55.97%
- Acceptance rate (MBBS): 2.73% (Overall); 0.004% for AIIMS (ND); 0.01% for JIPMER (P); 0.09% for AIIMS
- Website: neet.nta.nic.in As per NTA Public Notice dated 30.12.2024

The National Eligibility cum Entrance Test (Undergraduate) or NEET (UG) (/niːt/ "neat"), formerly known as the All India Pre-Medical Test (AIPMT), is an Indian nationwide entrance examination conducted by the National Testing Agency (NTA) for admission in undergraduate medical programs. As a mandatory exam for admission in medical programs, it is the largest exam in India in terms of number of applicants.

Until 2012, the AIPMT was conducted by the Central Board of Secondary Education (CBSE). In 2013, NEET-UG was introduced, conducted by CBSE, replacing AIPMT. However, due to legal challenges, NEET was temporarily replaced by AIPMT in both 2014 and 2015. In 2016, NEET was reintroduced and conducted by CBSE. From 2019 onwards, the NTA has been responsible for conducting the NEET exam.

After the enactment of NMC Act 2019 in September 2019, NEET-UG became the sole entrance test for admissions to medical colleges in India including the All India Institutes of Medical Sciences (AIIMS) and Jawaharlal Institute of Postgraduate Medical Education & Research (JIPMER) which until then conducted separate exams.

== History ==
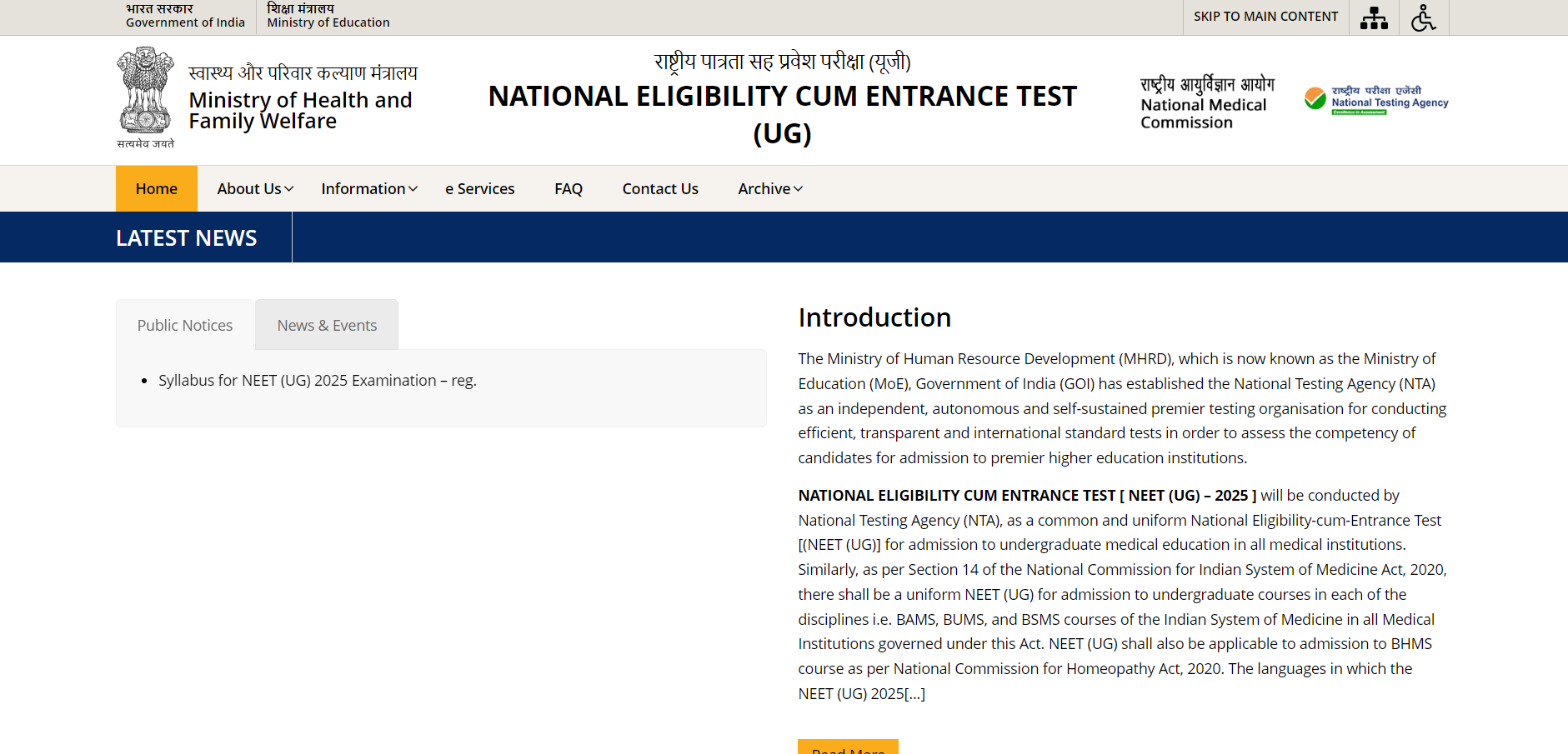
Official website of NTA NEET 2025

Before NEET (UG) was implemented nationwide, states conducted their own entrance tests and some medical colleges like such as AIIMS, JIPMER, IMS-BHU and CMC Vellore conducted their own entrance exams.

NEET was initially proposed to take place from 2012 onwards. However, for several reasons, the CBSE and Medical Council of India deferred NEET by a year. The test was announced by the Government of India and was held for the first time on 5 May 2013 across India for students seeking admission for both undergraduate and postgraduate medicine. On 18 July 2013, the Supreme Court ruled in favor of 115 petitions and cancelled the NEET exam and announced that the MCI could not interfere with the admission process done by colleges.

Following the announcement from the Medical Council of India that it would introduce the NEET-UG exam in 2012, several states including Andhra Pradesh, Karnataka, Gujarat, West Bengal and Tamil Nadu strongly opposed the change, stating that there was a huge variation in the syllabus proposed by the MCI and their state syllabi.

Even though NEET 2016 is conducted in English and Hindi, it was announced that students can write exams in Tamil, Telugu, Marathi, Bengali, Assamese and Gujarati languages from 2017 onwards. Kannada and Odia languages are added to the list so that students can write the exams in nine Indian languages and English. The Supreme Court of India quashed the NEET for admissions into all medical and dental colleges on 18 July 2013. The apex court ruled that the Medical Council of India cannot conduct a unified examination.

According to a 2013 announcement by CBSE, CBSE planned to conduct AIPMT on 4 May 2014. The final decision on NEET UG was planned to be taken after the verdict of the Supreme Court of India.

The Central Board of Secondary Education announces the results and the All India Merit List for NEET-UG. The merit list and the waiting list are prepared as per the directives of the Supreme Court of India, DGHS, MCI and DCI. The results for 2013 were announced on 5 June.

NEET was declared illegal and unconstitutional by the Supreme Court of India in 2013. However, it was restored on 11 April 2016, after a five-judge Constitution bench recalled the earlier verdict and allowed the Central Government and the Medical Council of India (MCI) to implement the common entrance test until the court decides afresh on its validity.

Phase One Test (2016)

The All India Pre Medical Test, also known as AIPMT, held on 1 May 2016, was considered as the first phase of the NEET. Students who registered for Phase One were given a chance to appear for the next phase of NEET held on 24 July 2016, but with a condition that candidates have to give up their NEET Phase 1 score. The above dates are as per the order of the Supreme Court.

== Exam pattern and structure ==
There are a total of 180 questions asked in the exam, 45 questions each from Physics, Chemistry, Botany and Zoology. Each correct response fetches 4 marks and each incorrect response gets −1 negative marking. The exam duration is 3 hours (180 min). The exam is of 720 marks (maximum marks).

== Syllabus ==
NEET (UG) syllabus consists of the core concepts of Physics, Chemistry and Biology taught in classes 11 and 12 as prescribed by the NCERT.

== Organizing body ==
The National Testing Agency (NTA) has been made the nodal agency for conduct of all India competitive exams and conducts NEET (UG) from 2019. The Central Board of Secondary Education conducted NEET between 2013 and 2018 before the setting of NTA.

== Opposition and criticism ==
The introduction of NEET has received opposition from some entities, most notably the state of Tamil Nadu. The bulk of the major political parties represented in the state, including the AIADMK and the ruling DMK have expressed resistance to the test on multiple grounds. Notably many of these states had regional State Boards which taught slightly different materials in the 11th and 12th grade posing a significant disadvantage for aspirants.

Albert P'Rayan writing for The Hindu criticized NEET for introducing a Unified Standard Testing Examination that has encouraged the emergence of various coaching institutions in India which end up favoring the rich, urban and of those part of the historical Indian upper caste. A 2023 report that interviewed 38 of the top 50 in NEET-2023, revealed that all but one had undergone some level of coaching. Among the 50, 29 belonged to the general category and 37 of the 50 also studied in urban area schools and reported investing significant amounts of money in coaching. To address these disparities, initiatives like the National Level Common Entrance Examination (NLCEE) stepped in, offering free online coaching during the COVID-19 pandemic.

NEET-UG has also been criticized for not setting up a minimum qualifying percentage for each individual subject. A 2017 report that analyzed the results of 1,990 students who got admitted to MBBS with 0, single digit and negative marks in individual subjects through heavy donations.

== Number of applicants ==
Year	Date of examination	No. of candidates registered	No. of candidates appeared	Ref.
2013	5 May 2013	717,127	658,040	
2014	Exam not held (AIPMT held instead)			
2015	Exam not held (AIPMT held instead)			
2016	1 May 2016 (Phase I)	802,594	731,233	
2016	24 July 2016 (Phase II)	802,594	731,233	
2017	7 May 2017	1,138,890	1,090,085	
2018	6 May 2018	1,326,725	1,269,922	
2019	5 May 2019	1,519,375	1,410,755	
2020	13 September 2020 (Note: Postponed due to the COVID-19 pandemic.)	1,597,435	1,366,945	
2021	12 September 2021	1,614,777	1,544,275	
2022	17 July 2022	1,872,343	1,764,571	
2023	7 May 2023	2,087,462	2,038,596	
2024	5 May 2024	2,406,079	2,333,297	
2025	4 May 2025	2,276,069	2,209,318	
2026	3 May 2026	(Exam cancelled due to paper leak)		
2026	21 June 2026 (Re-examination)	2,279,743	1,999,895	

== Exam cutoff and reservation ==
Each year in the NEET exam, a substantial number of candidates qualify by meeting the minimum percentile-based criteria set by the NTA which only makes them eligible for counselling. However, the number of MBBS seats available is far lower: only about 60,000 seats for government medical college and 58,000 seats for private medical colleges in India. This causes a steep gap: many who qualify according to the eligibility criteria still do not get admission because the actual cutoff for admission into a college (based on marks, category, rank and seat availability) is much higher than the qualifying cutoff. This means only about 2.73% of students actually get a government sponsored medical seat.

Many private medical seats go unfilled each year because of extremely high education fee, even though millions of students qualify NEET. While government medical colleges charge around ₹7,000 (US$73) to ₹6 lakh (US$6,200), private MBBS fee can go upwards of ₹1 crore (US$100,000).

Over 1,700 private medical seats in Uttar Pradesh alone were left vacant during the mop-up round solely due to unaffordable fee, lack of educational loans and government funding; also considering the socio-economic condition of Indian population, it is extremely difficult to cash a private medical seat.

Category	Minimum Qualifying Percentile
As of 2019
Unreserved (UR)	50th Percentile
Unreserved PH (UR-PH)	45th Percentile
Scheduled Caste (SC)	40th Percentile
Scheduled Tribe (ST)	40th Percentile
Other Backward Classes (OBC)	40th Percentile
SC-PH	40th Percentile
ST-PH	40th Percentile
OBC-PH	40th Percentile

Category	PwD	% Reservation in Total Medical Seats
OBC	No	25.65
OBC	Yes	1.35
SC	No	14.25
SC	Yes	0.75
EWS	No	9.5
EWS	Yes	0.5
ST	No	7.125
ST	Yes	0.375
Unreserved (Open) (Note: Note that Unreserved seats can be contested by all candidates regardless of the reservation already implemented.)	No	38.475
Unreserved (Open)	Yes	2.025

== Colleges and medical seats ==
As per the orders of the Supreme Court and the NMC Act 2019, a single medical entrance exam is conducted all over India for admission into medical and dental colleges. Colleges and universities will not be able to conduct their own medical entrance exam and will accept students based on the All India Rank obtained in NEET-UG. After the declaration of the results, an All India Rank (AIR) is allotted to each candidate and a merit list is released.

The National Medical Commission conducts counselling (allotment of seats according to merit and candidate choice) for 15% state seats, central institutes and deemed universities. The counselling for remaining 85% state quota seats and private colleges is done by the medical boards of respective states. States prepare their separate merit list on basis of NEET-UG results. The total number of seats offered combining Gov. and under NEET as of 2024 are 196,515 (109,170 for MBBS, 28,088 for BDS, 52,720 for AYUSH and 6537 for BVSc).

College	No. of seats offered
MBBS colleges	109,170
BDS colleges	28,088
AYUSH colleges	52,720
BVSc colleges	6537
All colleges combined	196,515

== Courses ==
Under NEET(UG) following courses can be taken by a candidate:

- Bachelor of Medicine, Bachelor of Surgery (MBBS)
- Bachelor of Dental Surgery (BDS)
- Bachelor of Ayurvedic Medicine and Surgery (BAMS)
- Bachelor of Homeopathic Medicine and Surgery (BHMS)
- Bachelor of Naturopathy and Yoga Sciences (BNYS)
- Bachelor of Unani Medicine and Surgery (BUMS)
- Bachelor of Siddha Medicine and Surgery (BSMS)
- Bachelor of Veterinary Science and Animal Husbandry (BVSC & AH)
- Bachelor of Physiotherapy (BPT)
- Bachelor of Science in Nursing (BSc. nursing)

== Controversies ==
The NEET examination has been criticised for harbouring institutionalised corruption and accusations reached a pinnacle in the 2024 examination year. Investigations where undetaken by the CBI which reported "no systemic or institutional corruption involving the exam body itself, but rather serious procedural negligence". The CBI however has itself been repeatedly accused of political bias, internal corruption, and eroded credibility. The NTA body was also criticised for its opacity.

=== 2024 controversy ===
==== Paper leak ====
The exam paper for the 2024 NEET-UG exam was allegedly leaked a day before the exam in Patna, Bihar. On 5 May 2024, the day of the exam, an FIR was filed at the Shastri Nagar police station in Patna. According to police officials, the paper leak gang allegedly charged ₹30 lakh (US$31,000) to ₹50 lakh (US$52,000) from several candidates, providing them with the question papers, claimed to be those of NEET-UG, a day prior for memorization. The police have arrested several suspects in connection with the paper leak.

On 22 June, the NTA chief, Subodh Kumar Singh, was removed from his position. The Ministry of Education handed over the case related to the leak to the Central Bureau of Investigation (CBI).

The CBI, on 18 July has carried out various arrests including four MBBS students from AIIMS Patna and a civil Engineering student from NIT Jamshedpur (Pankaj Kumar) in connection to the paper leak and solving of the leaked paper. On 19 July, a first year MBBS student (Surabhi Kumari) from RIMS Ranchi who was allegedly involved in solving the paper.

The CBI so far has arrested 36 persons in relation to the NEET Paper leak case.

==== Discrepancies in result ====
The results of the examination were declared on 4 June 2024, ten days earlier than the previously scheduled date. A total of 67 students achieved a perfect score, a significantly higher number than in previous examinations, which raised controversy. The National Testing Agency (NTA), the examination organizer, clarified that the higher number of top scorers was due to 44 of the 67 students answering a physics question incorrectly but still being awarded marks because of a mistake in the NCERT book.

Several examinees received scores of 718 or 719, which students argued was mathematically impossible under the exam marking scheme. The NTA later clarified that 1,563 examinees, including six toppers from the same center, were awarded compensatory marks for lost time. (Note: Compensatory marks were awarded based on a normalization formula established by the Supreme Court in a 2018 judgment.) Examinees at some centers in Haryana, Delhi, and Chhattisgarh complained that they were given less than the allotted time to complete their examination and filed writ petitions before the High Courts of Punjab & Haryana, Delhi, and Chhattisgarh. However, after the intervention of the Supreme Court, the NTA decided to withdraw the grace marks and hold the examination again for those 1,563 candidates on 23 June 2024. Out of these, 813 students took the retest.

==== Petitions filed in the Supreme Court ====
Several petitions were filed in the High Courts of different states and the Supreme Court of India, including one by Alakh Pandey, co-founder of the ed-tech company Physics Wallah. On 13 June 2024, the Supreme Court of India allowed the cancellation of the scorecards of the 1,563 candidates who were given grace marks and ordered a re-test for those candidates.

A Bench of Chief Justice of India Dhananjaya Yeshwant Chandrachud with Justices Jamshed Burjor Pardiwala and Manoj Misra dealt with the matter.

On 8 July, the CJI led bench of the Supreme court ordered the CBI Investigation officer to file an Investigation report and scheduled the next hearing for July 11 which was later postponed to 18 July.

The petitions requesting re NEET were heard on 8 July, 11 July, 22 July as well as 23 July. The Supreme Court of India led by Chief Justice Dhananjaya Yeshwant Chandrachud upheld the examinations and said that there was no indication of a widespread leak all over the country.

=== 2026 controversy ===
The 2026 examination was held on 3 May 2026. On May 11, it was reported that the Rajasthan Special Operations Group (SOG) had started an investigation after a "guess paper" circulated in Sikar was found to be very similar to the actual exam. According to reports, questions worth nearly 600 out of 720 marks matched the circulated material. While investigations are ongoing, the National Testing Agency (NTA) stated they are looking into these claims of paper leak and malpractice.

On 12 May 2026, the examination that was held on 3 May was cancelled. The exam was reconducted on 21 June 2026. The leaked paper was circulated to a large number of students on social media platforms like Whatsapp, that made it difficult to trace who benefited from the leaked paper. The issue was formally turned over to the Central Bureau of Investigation for a thorough investigation. Initial investigations revealed that the leak may have occurred during the printing of the examination papers.

== Computer-based exam ==
On 15 May 2026, the Union education minister Dharmendra Pradhan announced that the examination would be conducted in a fully computer-based test (CBT) mode from the following year (2027), marking a major reform to the national medical entrance examination system.

== See also ==
- National Testing Agency
- National Exit Test
- All India Pre Medical Test
- National Eligibility cum Entrance Test (Postgraduate)
- National Board of Examinations in Medical Sciences – Board governing medical licensure in India
- Joint Entrance Examination – Main
- Junior Science Talent Search Examination
- Compulsory Rotating Medical Internship
- Medical Council of India Screening Test

=== Related to Indian medical system ===
- Healthcare in India
- Medical education in India
- National Medical Commission
- Indian Council of Medical Research
- National Commission for Indian System of Medicine
- Ministry of Health and Family Welfare
- List of medical colleges in India
- List of hospitals in India
- All India Institutes of Medical Sciences
