= National Exit Test =

Proposed exam in India

National Exit Test (abbreviated as NExT) is a proposed examination for all MBBS students in India that is required to pass the final year and obtain a license to practice medicine. Admissions to postgraduate courses will be based on the merit of a candidate in NExT. Introduced by the National Medical Commission Act, 2019, National Commission for Indian System of Medicine Act, 2020 and National Commission for Homoeopathy Act, 2020. NExT will also serve the purpose of Screening Test for Foreign Medical Graduates who are now required to qualify Foreign Medical Graduate Examination (FMGE) and will for admission into postgraduate medical courses. In January 2020, the Ministry of Health and Family Welfare also introduced the draft National Dental Commission Act, 2023 that also called for National Exit Test after BDS for dentists in India.

== History ==
The very first amendment to the NMC Bill was in February 2018, then again in March 2019. A lot of debates and discussions regarding these came up from medical practitioners and medical aspirants.

On January 7, 2019, The National Commission for Indian System of Medicine Bill, 2019 was introduced in Rajya Sabha by Shripad Yesso Naik, Minister of State for AYUSH.

On July 17, 2019, The Union Cabinet approved the Bill with a purpose to unify all the medical entrance examinations and setting uniform standards for Indian System of Medicine.

Among other reforms, NMC Bill sought to introduce the National Exit Test in the Indian System of Medicine. In year 2020 the Medical Council of India was replaced with a new authority that is called National Medical Commission or NMC.

The National Medical Commission released draft regulations in 2021 on foreign medical graduates (FMGs) that amends the requirement for the Foreign Medical Graduate Exam. Starting at an unknown date, overseas graduates will be required to qualify the new National Exit Test (NExT) in place of the Foreign Medical Graduate Exam (FMGE). Candidates intending to practice in India will have to clear NExT, within two years of completing their medical studies abroad. The draft regulation is expected to become official when published in the next gazette.

== Criticism ==
A lack of provision for repeaters and failures of the test was cited as a concern. However, it was clarified that the exam will have no cap on the number of attempts.
