= Graduate Pharmacy Aptitude Test =

Entrance examination in India

- Acronym: GPAT
- Type: Computer-based test (CBT)
- Administrator: National Board of Examinations in Medical Sciences (NBEMS) on behalf of the Pharmacy Council of India (PCI)
- Skills tested: Pharmaceutical chemistry, pharmaceutics, pharmacognosy, pharmacology
- Purpose: Admission to M. Pharm
- Year started: 2010
- Duration: 180 minutes
- Score range: 0 to 500
- Score validity: Three years
- Offered: Once a year
- Regions: India
- Languages: English
- Prerequisites: B. Pharm (or equivalent)
- Fee: ₹3500 (General/OBC/EWS) ₹2500 (SC/ST/PwD)
- Used by: Indian universities and colleges
- Website: natboard.edu.in

The Graduate Pharmacy Aptitude Test (GPAT) is a computer-based standardised test in India conducted by the National Board of Examinations in Medical Sciences (NBEMS) on behalf of the Pharmacy Council of India (PCI), to determine the eligibility of candidates for admission to the Master of Pharmacy (M. Pharm) programme in Indian government and private universities, colleges, and institutes.

The first GPAT examination was held in 2010. Until 2018, it was conducted by the All India Council for Technical Education (AICTE). From 2019 to 2023, the exam was conducted by the National Testing Agency. Since 2024, it is conducted by the Pharmacy Council of India (PCI) through National Board of Examinations in Medical Sciences (NBEMS).

== Organising authority ==
The first GPAT examination was held in 2010, conducted by the All India Council for Technical Education (AICTE) under the Ministry of Education, Government of India. Until 2018, AICTE conducted the exam. From 2019 to 2023, the exam was conducted by the National Testing Agency as per the direction of the Ministry of Education. In March 2020, the Supreme Court of India held that the AICTE Act should not be applied to pharmacy, for which the Pharmacy Act of 1948 will be applicable, making the Pharmacy Council of India (PCI) the sole authority over matters related to pharmacy. Since 2024, the examination is conducted by the Pharmacy Council of India (PCI) through the National Board of Examinations in Medical Sciences (NBEMS).

== Examination ==
The exam is held only in English. Candidate must be an Indian citizen. There is no age restriction. Bachelor of Pharmacy (B. Pharm) or its equivalent degree holders are eligible to apply, however, B. Tech in Pharmaceutical and Fine Chemical Technology or its equivalent degree holders are not eligible to apply. As per the official syllabus, the subjects are listed as: pharmaceutical chemistry and allied subjects, pharmaceutics and allied subjects, pharmacognosy and allied subjects, pharmacology and allied subjects, and other subjects. There are 125 questions, with a maximum of 500 marks. Each correct answer carries four marks and one mark will be deducted for every incorrect answer.

== See also ==
- Public service commissions in India
