= NAMO Medical Education and Research Institute =

Indian government medical college in Silvassa

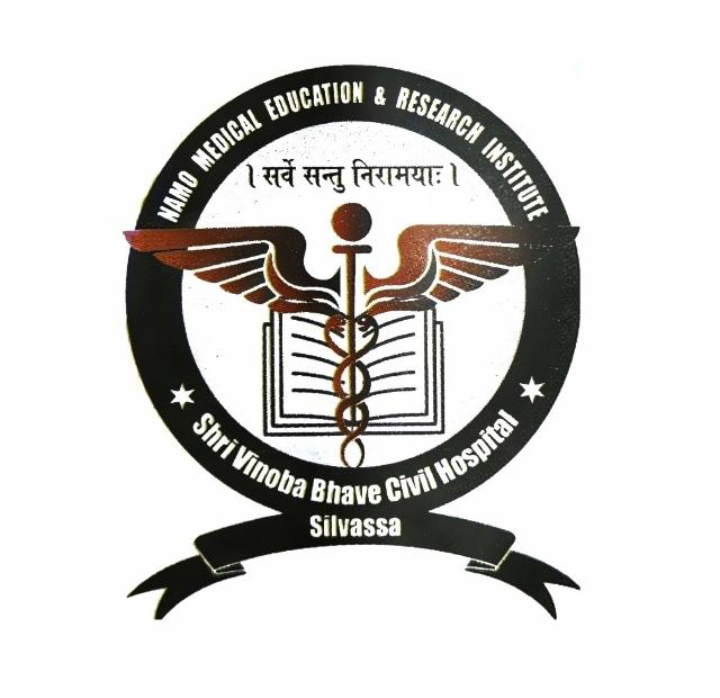
- Other name: GMC Silvassa
- Type: Medical college, Research institute and Hospital
- Established: January 19, 2019; 7 years ago
- Affiliations: Veer Narmad South Gujarat University, NMC
- Dean: Dr. Ram Chandra Goyal
- Location: Sayali Road, Silvassa, Silvassa, Dadra and Nagar Haveli and Daman and Diu, Dadra Nagar Haveli & Daman Diu, India
- Campus: 15 Acres; Semi-Urban
- Website: namomeridnhdd.in

NAMO Medical Education & Research Institute (also known as Government Medical College, Silvassa) is a government medical college located in Silvassa in the union territory of Dadra and Nagar Haveli and Daman and Diu. The union government allocated the fund of 289 crore for its construction. The foundation stone was laid by the Prime Minister of India Narendra Modi on 19 January 2019, and the first undergraduate batch commenced on 15 August 2019.

The medical college is attached to Shri Vinoba Bhave Civil Hospital, Silvassa. It is expected to meet the growing demand of doctors in the region. The college is affiliated to Veer Narmad South Gujarat University and imparts the Bachelor of Medicine and Bachelor of Surgery (MBBS) degree which is recognized by National Medical Commission. The selection of the college is done purely on the basis of merit through National Eligibility and Entrance Test (UG). The yearly undergraduate student intake is 177.

== Courses ==
NAMO Medical Education and Research Institute undertakes education and training of students for MBBS course. This college offers 177 MBBS seats of which 85% Seats are filled through State quota and 15% through All-India quota.
