= Medical Council of India =

Indian medical organization (1933–2020)

- Medical Council of India
- Abbreviation: MCI
- Successor: National Medical Commission
- Formation: 1933; 93 years ago
- Dissolved: 25 September 2020; 6 years ago
- Type: Statutory body
- Legal status: Abolished
- Headquarters: New Delhi, India
- Main organ: Council
- Parent organization: Ministry of Health and Family Welfare

The Medical Council of India (MCI) was a statutory body for establishing uniform and high standards of medical education in India until its dissolution on 25-September-2020 when it was replaced by National Medical Commission. The Council granted recognition of medical qualifications, gave accreditation to medical schools, granted registration to medical practitioners, and monitored medical practice in India. The MCI faced persistent criticism for corruption.

The Supreme Court of India authorized the Central Government to replace the medical council and to monitor the medical education system in India with the help of five specialized doctors from July 2017.

The NITI Aayog recommended the replacement of Medical Council of India (MCI) with National Medical Commission (NMC). First approved by most states, followed by the Prime Minister, the NMC bill was passed into law by parliament and approved by the president on 8 August 2019. Once the National Medical Commission came into being on 25 September 2020, the 87-year old Medical Council of India was automatically dissolved and the Indian Medical Council Act stood abolished.

== History ==
The Medical Council of India was first established in 1934 under the Indian Medical Council Act, 1933. The council was later reconstituted under the Indian Medical Council Act, 1956 that replaced the earlier Act.

The Council granted recognition of medical qualifications, gave accreditation to medical schools, granted registration to medical practitioners, and monitored medical practice in India.

The MCI faced persistent criticism for corruption. The growth of privately run medical colleges, starting in the 1980s, presented a major regulatory challenge for the MCI. Frontline reported that corruption in the MCI was exacerbated by the amendment of 1993 (Section 10A) that gave powers to the MCI to endorse or decline the establishment of new colleges and courses in India. After 1993, the MCI neglected to maintain the Indian Medical Register (IMR) of registered medical practitioners in the country. Author Sanjeev Kelkar writes that the election process of the MCI was faulty since "those who are to be regulated get elected as the regulator."

In 2001, the Dehli High Court ordered the removal of the MCI president Ketan Desai after concluding that the organization suffered from a high level of corruption with Desai found guilty of corruption and abuse of power. Desai returned to the MCI in 2007 and was again appointed president in 2009.

The MCI was dissolved by the President of India on 15 May 2010 following the arrest of MCI's president Ketan Desai by the Central Bureau of Investigation(CBI) on 22 April 2010. Desai, alleged middle-man J. P. Singh and doctors Sukhwinder Singh and Kanwaljit Singh, were booked under the Prevention of Corruption Act. The CBI recovered 1.5 kg of gold and 80 kg of silver from Desai's premises. Further, gold worth ₨ 35 lakhs were recovered from Desai's bank lockers in Ahmedabad. Desai, the head of urology at B J Medical College and president of the Gujarat Medical Council was caught by the CBI for accepting a bribe of 2 crores to grant recognition to a private college. Desai was removed from the MCI and his registration cancelled.

The council was superseded by the President of India and its functions entrusted to a Board of Governors, notified on 13 May 2011.

The MCI was reconstituted on 6 November 2013.

=== Replacement by National Medical Commission (NMC) ===
The NITI Aayog, an Indian government think tank, presented a draft towards a new National Medical Commission (NMC) in 2016. Restructuring and reforming the MCI was also the subject of a 2017 report that was part of the Brookings India Impact Series. The Supreme Court of India authorized the Central Government to replace the MCI and to utilize a team of five specialized doctors to monitor the nation's medical education system, from July 2017. The Central Information Commission stated that the MCI had failed to disclose requested meeting notes and membership records surrounding the suspension records of Desai in 2017, and would not furnish the requested qualifications of professors and doctors who inspected medical colleges for the MCI since 2013.

The government of India issued an ordinance on 26 September 2018 to divest the functions of the MCI and replace it with a seven member board of governors. The National Medical Commission (NMC) was brought in to replace Medical Council of India (MCI) through an ordinance issued in January, 2019 by the President of India. The National Medical Commission Bill was re-introduced in the Lok Sabha on 22 July 2019. The bill was passed by the Lok Sabha on 30 July 2019 and by the Rajya Sabha on 1 August 2019. The National Medical Commission Act, 2019 came into force on 8 August 2019.

On 25 September 2020 the MCI was dissolved and replaced by the National Medical Commission.

== Functions of the council ==
The main functions of the MCI were listed as:

- Establish and maintain uniform standards for undergraduate medical education.
- Regulate postgraduate medical education in medical colleges accredited by it. (The National Board of Examinations is another statutory body for postgraduate medical education in India).
- Recognition of medical qualifications granted by University or UGC in medical institutions in India.
- Recognition of foreign medical qualifications in India.
- Accreditation of medical colleges.
- Registration of doctors with recognized medical qualifications. The state medical councils maintained a register of doctors, forwarded quarterly to the national MCI. Foreign medical graduates could register directly.
- Maintain a directory of all registered doctors (called the Indian Medical Register).
- Amend, as needed, the regulation of medical education and practices.

=== Telemedicine ===
During the COVID-19 pandemic in March 2020, the Medical Council of India made necessary guidelines for the telemedicine in India which had previously been considered unethical. These regulations helped patients to consult their doctors during the pandemic without the need to visit the hospital.

== State Medical Councils ==
- Punjab Medical Council
- Bihar Medical Council
- Gujarat Medical Council
- Andhra Pradesh Medical Council
- Jharkhand Medical Council
- Hyderabad Medical Council
- Maharashtra Medical Council
- Rajasthan Medical Council
- Travancore Cochin Medical Council, Trivandrum
- Vidharba Medical Council
- Assam Medical Council
- Karnataka Medical Council
- Orissa Council of Medical Registration
- Bombay Medical Council
- Madhya Pradesh Medical Council
- West Bengal Medical Council
- Uttar Pradesh Medical Council
- Madras Medical Council
- Tamil Nadu Medical Council

== MCI Online ==
"MCI Online" was the portal of the Medical Council of India for online processing of applications for registration (of medical qualifications) and for professional certificates. "MCI Online" also provided online search of the Indian Medical Register. Medical Council of India was superseded vide Indian Medical Council (Amendment) Ordinance, 2018 (Ordinance 8 of 2018) dated 26.09.2018, by the Board of Governors. The Board of Governors assumed the functions of the Medical Council of India on 26.09.2018 AN.

== Awards ==
- Dr. B. C. Roy Awards: Dr. B.C. Roy National Award Fund was instituted in 1962 to perpetuate his memory. The Award was presented to a distinguished medical person in each of the categories of Statesmanship of the Highest Order in our country, Medical man-cum-Statesman, Eminent Medical Person, Eminent person in Philosophy and Eminent person in Arts.
- Hari Om Ashram Award: Hari Om Ashram Alembic Research Award Fund accepted nominations for Hari Om Ashram Alembic Research Awards under the categories of Basic Research in Medical Sciences, Clinical Research and Operational Research.
- Silver Jubilee Award: Silver Jubilee Research Award Fund was available to individuals for original and outstanding work in the field of medical and allied science in India. The award also provided aid or assistance for projects in medical institutions engaged in education, for research, and to support travel fellowship.

== See also ==
- All India Institute of Medical Sciences
- Compulsory Rotating Medical Internship
- Medical Council of India Screening Test
- Medical deemed universities
- National Testing Agency
- The National Council for Human Resource in Health in India
- University Grants Commission
