= Diplomate of National Board =

Postgraduate degree in medicine awarded in India

The Diplomate of National Board (DNB) is a postgraduate degree in medicine (equivalent to doctoral degree in science ) awarded by the National Board of Examinations in Medical Sciences (NBEMS) under the Ministry of Health and Family Welfare, Government of India, on completion of three-year training in any of 30 broad specialties. DNB is equivalent to the Master of Medicine (MD), Master of Surgery (MS), Doctor of Medicine (DM), and Master of Chirurgiae (MCh) in all purposes. Doctors who already hold an MD/MS/DM/MCh are eligible to directly appear in the DNB final examination.

Doctorate of National Board (DrNB) is a post MD/MS/DNB doctoral level super speciality degree awarded by NBE. It is equivalent to Doctorate of Medicine (DM) / Master of Chirurgiae (MCh) degrees awarded respectively in medical and surgical super specialities.

== Demand ==
Doctors who already hold an MD/MS/DM/MCh are eligible to directly appear in the DNB exit examinations in their specialty. In 2023, about 50 percent of the candidates who attended the DNB exit examinations were MS, MD, DM, or MCh holders. Observing the trend, the then director of NBEMS, Minu Bajpai, commented that it "serve as a validation of their degrees.It also underscores the credibility of DNB and DrNB exits". Noting the exponential increase in MBBS holders opting for DNB, B. Srinivas, the then secretary of National Medical Commission (NMC), said that it is "because it [DNB] does not come with restrictions of bond policies. Besides, it has a moderate fee structure as compared to MD/MS courses", and that "some Middle Eastern countries give prominence to DNB degrees, which encourages young doctors to opt for it".

The DNB qualification is recognised by the NMC and is widely accepted clinically as well as academically both nationally and internationally, which enhances the career prospects for doctors".

== Recognition of DNB qualifications ==
Diplomate of National Board (DNB) postgraduate degree is equivalent to the Master of Medicine (MD), Master of Surgery (MS), Doctor of Medicine (DM), and Master of Chirurgiae (MCh) in all purposes (including appointment to teaching posts). On 20 February 2009, the Government of India notified the same through an extraordinary gazette order, pertaining to the amendment made in the First Schedule of the Indian Medical Council Act of 1956, where DNB qualifications are listed.

The postgraduate degree awarded by the National Board of Examinations in Medical Sciences (NBEMS) is called the Diplomate of National Board (DNB). The list of recognised qualifications awarded by the NBEMS in various broad specialties and super-specialties as approved by the Government of India are included in the First Schedule of the Indian Medical Council Act, 1956.

== List of broad specialties ==
Three-year postgraduate residency programme is available in the following broad specialties:

- Anaesthesiology 2 years
- Anatomy
- Biochemistry
- Community medicine
- Dermatology, venereology, and leprosy 2 years
- Emergency medicine
- Family medicine
- Forensic medicine
- General medicine
- General surgery
- Geriatric medicine
- Hospital administration
- Immunohematology and blood transfusion
- Maternal and child health
- Microbiology
- Nuclear medicine 2 years
- Obstetrics and gynaecology 2 years
- Ophthalmology, 2 years
- Orthopedics
- Otorhinolaryngology (ENT) 2 years
- Paediatrics 2 years
- Palliative medicine
- Pathology 2 years
- Pharmacology
- Physical medicine and rehabilitation 2 years
- Physiology
- Psychiatry 2 years
- Radiation oncology 2 years
- Radio diagnosis 2 years
- Respiratory medicine 2 years

== Doctorate of National Board ==
The Doctorate of National Board (DrNB) is a postdoctoral-level super-specialty programme conducted by the NBEMS in various super-specialty disciplines. The duration of the course is three years for postgraduates, such as MS, MD, or DNB. Candidates can also join after MBBS directly into an integrated six-year DrNB programme in limited super-specialty disciplines. The programme is available in the following super-specialties:

Three-year programme

- Cardiac anaesthesia
- Cardio vascular and thoracic surgery
- Cardiology
- Clinical haematology
- Clinical immunology and rheumatology
- Critical care medicine
- Endocrinology
- Gynaecological oncology
- Interventional radiology
- Medical gastroenterology
- Medical genetics
- Medical oncology
- Neonatology
- Nephrology
- Neuro anasthesia
- Neuro surgery
- Neurology
- Paediatric cardiology
- Paediatric critical care
- Paediatric neurology
- Paediatric surgery
- Plastic and reconstructive surgery
- Surgical gastroenterology
- Surgical oncology
- Thoracic surgery
- Urology
- Vascular surgery

Six-year programme

- Cardiac anasthesia
- Cardio vascular and thoracic surgery
- Neurosurgery
- Paediatric surgery
- Plastic and reconstructive surgery

== List of subspecialties for FNB ==
The National Board of Examinations also runs Postdoctoral fellowship programme in select subspecialties. On successful completion of two-year residency, candidates are awarded Fellow of National Board (FNB).

Fellowship programme is available in the following subspecialties:

- Arthroplasty
- Breast imaging
- Hand & Micro Surgery
- Maternal and Foetal medicine
- Infectious Diseases
- Interventional Cardiology
- Laboratory Medicine
- Liver Transplantation
- Minimal Access Surgery
- Neurovascular intervention
- Paediatric Gastroenterology
- Paediatric Haemato Oncology
- Paediatric Nephrology
- Pain medicine
- Reproductive Medicine
- Spine Surgery
- Sports Medicine
- Trauma & Acute Care surgery
- Vitreo-Retinal Surgery

== See also ==
- Medical Council of India Screening Test – Doctors' qualifying examination
- National Eligibility cum Entrance Test (Postgraduate) – Entrance examination for postgraduate medical admissions in India
- Paper leak in India – Unauthorised disclosure of examination papers in India also known as Exam Mafia
