= Compulsory Rotating Medical Internship =

Compulsory work in hospitals attached to a medical college

The Compulsory Rotating Medical Internship (CRMI) refers to one year of compulsory work in hospitals attached to a medical college or in any other approved teaching hospital before becoming qualified to practice as an independent doctor or dentist in India. As stipulated by the National Medical Commission (NMC), the CRMI is essential for the award of the MBBS degree and full NMC registration as a physician. For dentists, the CRMI is regulated by the Dental Council of India.

== Description ==
An intern (also called an Internee or CRMI) is posted in all the clinical departments of the hospital on a rotational basis. This gives them the basic clinical exposure to all the specialties. For CRMI completion, interns are assigned a list of procedures that they must perform and observe.

The intern is given a monthly stipend. The amount is dependent on university and state policies. Completion of an internship is a necessary prerequisite for acquiring a license to practice medicine, postgraduate studies, and higher specialty training.

On passing the final MBBS/BDS examination at the end of 4.5 years, a medical/dental student is first awarded a Provisional Registration certificate by the National Medical Commission or Dental Council of India. Permanent Registration certificate along with the "NMC/DCI Registration number" and the final medical/dental degree is given only after obtaining a CRMI Completion Certificate endorsing the successful and satisfactory completion of CRMI requirements.

== Comparison ==
This internship is different from the United Kingdom's system of foundation doctors, in which the transition period from medical school to general practice is not required. Unlike a house physician/surgeon, interns are provided a stipend based on university and state policies, as opposed to monthly salaries. The American counterpart is conducted within a specific medical specialty and is called a "resident" or a "resident doctor" (i.e., a resident physician or a resident surgeon, etc.). In some countries, they are also called a "senior house officer".

Post-internship, a MBBS graduate can practice medicine independently in India. The National Medical Commission and National Board of Examinations (NBE) approves MD, MS, DM, MCh, and DNB post-graduate degrees. In comparison, MD graduates in the US must pursue a residency to be able to practice independently, which can range from 1-3 years in order to get a license.

== Responsibilities ==
Interns are entrusted with clinical responsibilities under the supervision of an experienced clinician. They do not work independently but can treat patients. Interns cannot issue medical certificates, death certificates, or medico-legal documents under their own signatures since they lack a MCI registration number.

MBBS graduates that studied abroad in institutions affected by the COVID-19 pandemic and 2022 Russian invasion of Ukraine are required to undergo two years of CRMI to ensure full clinical exposure.

== Stipend and Pay ==
Medical graduates undertaking the Compulsory Rotating Medical Internship (CRMI) are paid a monthly stipend for the duration of their internship. The stipend is a form of remuneration for the clinical training and duties performed by interns during the compulsory internship period and is separate from the tuition fees and other charges payable for the MBBS course.

The stipend is not uniform across India. Under the National Medical Commission (NMC)'s "Compulsory Rotating Medical Internship Regulations, 2021", all interns are to be paid a stipend "as fixed by the appropriate authority applicable to the institution/University or State". Consequently, the amount received by an intern can vary substantially, even when the institutions are located within the same state. Differences may arise from the administrative authority governing the medical college, the applicable government or university pay order, the status of the institution, and subsequent revisions to the stipend.

Monthly stipend paid to compulsory rotating medical interns (CRMI) across Indian states and union territories, in Indian rupees (₹) per month.

=== Central government medical institutes ===
Medical interns at centrally administered medical institutions receive stipends determined by the Government of India. These include institutions such as the All India Institutes of Medical Sciences (AIIMS), Institute of Medical Sciences (BHU), Jawaharlal Institute of Postgraduate Medical Education and Research (JIPMER), Vardhman Mahavir Medical College (VMMC) and other medical institutions administered by the Union Government or autonomous central institutions.

The centrally prescribed MBBS internship stipend was increased from ₹23,500 per month to ₹26,300 in 2020 and subsequently to ₹30,070 from 1 January 2022. Although the actual stipend may vary between institutions according to their respective administrative and financial arrangements.

Effective date	Monthly stipend
2018	₹23,500
2020	₹26,300
2022	₹30,070

=== State government medical colleges ===
==== Andaman and Nicobar Islands ====
Andaman and Nicobar has only one medical college, the Andaman & Nicobar Islands Institute of Medical Sciences, and the internship stipend listed by the National Medical Commission (NMC) for undergraduate medical interns is ₹30,070 per month.

==== Andhra Pradesh ====
Medical interns at government medical institutions in Andhra Pradesh receive stipends determined by the Government of Andhra Pradesh. The state-prescribed MBBS internship stipend in Andhra Pradesh was revised to ₹22,527 per month in October 2022 and subsequently increased to ₹25,906 per month, effective from 1 January 2024.

==== Arunachal Pradesh ====
Arunachal Pradesh has only one medical college, the Tomo Riba Institute of Health and Medical Sciences, and the internship stipend listed by the National Medical Commission (NMC) for undergraduate medical interns is ₹25,000 per month.

==== Assam ====
Medical interns at government medical institutions in Assam receive stipends determined by the Government of Assam. These include state-run institutions such as Gauhati Medical College, Silchar Medical College and other such state funded institutions. The state-prescribed MBBS internship stipend in Assam was revised in recent years to around ₹31,000 per month and has been further updated to ₹36,225 per month for state government medical colleges.

==== Bihar ====
Medical interns at government medical institutions in Bihar receive stipends determined by the Government of Bihar. The state-prescribed MBBS internship stipend in Bihar was raised from ₹20,000 per month to ₹27,000 per month by the state's cabinet decision following protests by interns at Patna Medical College and Hospital (PMCH). A distinct exception in the state is that the Indira Gandhi Institute of Medical Sciences (IGIMS) is a Institute under State Legislature Act and possesses its own financial framework, thereby paying its medical interns a sum of ₹30,000 per month.

==== Chandigarh ====
Chandigarh has only one state funded medical college, the Government Medical College and Hospital, and the internship stipend listed by the National Medical Commission (NMC) for undergraduate medical interns is ₹18,000 per month in FY 2024.

==== Chattisgarh ====
In September 2026, the Chhattisgarh government set the monthly MBBS internship stipend at ₹25000.

==== Dadra and Nagar Haveli and Daman and Diu ====
Dadra and Nagar Haveli & Daman and Diu has only one state funded medical college, the NAMO Medical Education & Research Institute, and the internship stipend listed by the National Medical Commission (NMC) for undergraduate medical interns is ₹15,000 per month in FY 2024.

==== Delhi ====
Medical interns at state-administered medical institutions under the Government of Delhi receive stipends determined by the Delhi Health Department. These include state-run medical colleges such as Maulana Azad Medical College (MAMC), Dr. Baba Saheb Ambedkar Medical College, etc. The state-prescribed MBBS internship stipend for Delhi state government institutions stands at ₹26,300 per month (revised from ₹23,500), following the Delhi state pay guidelines.

==== Goa ====
Goa has only one state funded medical college, the Goa Medical College. The state-prescribed MBBS internship stipend by the Government of Goa was raised from ₹20,000 per month to ₹30,000 per month following a 50% increase approved by the state cabinet.

==== Gujarat ====
Medical interns at state-administered medical institutions along with institutions managed by the Gujarat Medical Education & Research Society in Gujarat receive stipends determined by the Government of Gujarat. The state-prescribed MBBS internship stipend in Gujarat was revised from ₹18,200 per month to ₹21,840 per month following a 25% pay hike by the state cabinet.

==== Haryana ====
Medical interns at state-administered medical institutions in Haryana receive stipends determined by the Department of Medical Education and Research (DMER), Government of Haryana. The state-prescribed MBBS internship stipend in Haryana was revised from ₹17,000 per month to ₹24,310 per month.

==== Himanchal Pradesh ====
Medical interns at state-administered medical institutions under the Government of Himachal Pradesh receive the state-prescribed MBBS internship stipend of ₹20,000 per month.

==== Jammu and Kashmir ====
Medical interns at state-administered medical institutions in the Union Territory of Jammu and Kashmir receive stipends determined by the Government of J&K. The current monthly stipend for MBBS interns in Jammu and Kashmir is ₹12,300, but a hike is under active government review following recent protests.

==== Jharkhand ====
The monthly stipend for MBBS interns in government medical colleges across Jharkhand is ₹25,000, following a government revision from the previous ₹17,500.

==== Karnataka ====
The monthly stipend for MBBS interns in government medical colleges across Karnataka is ₹28,889.

==== Kerala ====
MBBS interns in Kerala government medical colleges receive a monthly stipend of around ₹27,300, while interns in private and self-financing medical colleges face a wide disparity, receiving anywhere from ₹1,500 to ₹15,000.

==== Madhya Pradesh ====
The state-prescribed MBBS internship stipend in Madhya Pradesh was revised from ₹14,337 per month to ₹21,500 per month in September 2026, following a Government of Madhya Pradesh approval for a 50% stipend hike, after the three day protest of medical interns.

==== Maharashtra ====
MBBS interns in Maharashtra receive a standard monthly stipend of ₹18,000 in both government and mandated private medical colleges.

==== Manipur ====
MBBS interns in Manipur receive a standard monthly stipend of ₹17,000 in state run medical colleges.

==== Meghalaya ====
Meghalaya has only one state funded medical college, the Shillong Medical College, and the internship stipend listed by the National Medical Commission (NMC) for undergraduate medical interns is ₹26,300 per month.

==== Mizoram ====
Mizoram has only one state funded medical college, the Zoram Medical College, and the internship stipend listed by the National Medical Commission (NMC) for undergraduate medical interns is ₹12,000 per month.

==== Odisha ====
MBBS interns in Odisha receive a monthly stipend of ₹44,319 per month. The Government of Odisha structures this remuneration by combining a base pay of ₹28,050 with the prevailing Dearness Allowance (DA), making Odisha the highest-paying region for medical internships in India.

==== Puducherry ====
MBBS interns in Puducherry receive a monthly stipend of ₹20,000 at state-run and private medical institutions, following a Directorate of Health and Family Welfare government mandate.

==== Punjab ====
MBBS interns in Punjab receive a monthly stipend of ₹22,000 at government medical and dental colleges. The Punjab government enacted this increase from the previous baseline of ₹15,000 per month following sustained representations by medical student associations.

==== Rajasthan ====
The mandated base monthly stipend for an MBBS intern in Rajasthan government medical colleges stands at ₹14,000 to ₹18,000 per month.

==== Tamil Nadu ====
MBBS interns in Tamil Nadu receive a monthly stipend of ₹28,139 at state funded medical institutions.

==== Telangana ====
The official monthly stipend for MBBS interns, called as house surgeons in Telangana is ₹29,792.

==== Uttar Pradesh ====
The MBBS internship stipend in Uttar Pradesh is currently set at ₹25,000 per month. Following a 108% increase by the Government of Uttar Pradesh in response to widespread protests around various state run medical institutions such as King George's Medical University (KGMU), Baba Raghav Das Medical College (BRD), Dr. Ram Manohar Lohia Institute of Medical Sciences (Dr. RMIMS) etc.

==== Uttarakhand ====
The current monthly stipend for MBBS interns in Uttarakhand is ₹17,000 per month.

==== West Bengal ====
Medical interns at state-administered medical institutions under the Government of West Bengal get paid around ₹43,000 to ₹44,000 when accounted alongside state Dearness allowance (DA) changes. In February 2025, Chief Minister Mamata Banerjee announced a significant structural revision, implementing a monthly stipend increase of for all medical interns from ₹28,050 to approximately ₹38,050 per month before the addition of DA, thereby making West Bengal one of the highest paying states of India.

== See also ==
- Bachelor of Medicine and Surgery
- Bachelor of Dental Surgery
- Medical College (India)
- List of dental colleges in India
- Medical school
- Medical education
