= Indian Medical Council Act, 1956 =

Indian legislation

Parliament of India
- Long title: An Act to provide for the reconstitution of the Medical Council of India, and the maintenance of a Medical Register for India and for matters connected therewith.
- Citation: Act No. 102 of 1956
- Territorial extent: India
- Enacted by: Parliament of India
- Assented to: 30 December 1956

Repeals
- Indian Medical Council Act, 1933

Amended by
- Indian Medical Council (Amendment) Act, 1964; Indian Medical Council (Amendment) Act, 1993; Indian Medical Council (Amendment) Act, 2001; Delegated Legislation Provisions (Amendment) Act, 2004; Indian Medical Council (Amendment) Act, 2010; Indian Medical Council (Amendment) Act, 2011; Indian Medical Council (Amendment) Act, 2012; Indian Medical Council (Amendment) Act, 2016; Indian Medical Council (Amendment) Act, 2019

Repealed by
- National Medical Commission Act, 2019
- Status: Repealed

The Indian Medical Council Act, 1956 was an Indian legislation that provided for the constitution of the Medical Council of India (MCI). The Act was repealed on 25 September 2020 and the MCI was dissolved on the same date. Prior to its dissolution, the MCI regulated standards of medical education, permission to start colleges, courses or increase the number of seats, registration of doctors, standards of professional conduct of medical practitioners. The MCI was replaced by the Nation Medical Commission.

== Amendments ==
Indian Medical Council (Amendment) Bill, 2016 was passed by Rajya Sabha on 1 August 2016 approving the applicability of the National Eligibility cum Entrance Test (NEET), an entrance exam for medical institutes in India.

== Repeal ==
The National Medical Commission (NMC) came into force from September 25, 2020, repealing the nearly 64-year-old Indian Medical Council Act 1956 and also dissolving all its bodies such as Medical Council of India and Board of Governors in Supersession of the MCI. As a result, the much-awaited NMC will start to function effectively to bring reforms in the Indian medical education sector. The National Medical Commission Act 2019 was passed by both houses of Parliament. For the initial three-year period of the NMC, Suresh Chandra Sharma, from the All India Institute of Medical Sciences, New Delhi, was appointed chairman, and Rakesh Kumar Vats, ex-Secretary General, Board of Governors - MCI, was appointed secretary.

The NMC is structured to have 10 ex-officio members and 22 part-time members appointed by the Central government. Members must declare their assets at the time of joining and departing the office, and must declare their professional and commercial engagement or involvement to ensure transparency. It has been further provided that chairperson/member on ceasing to hold office will not accept for a period of two years any employment in any capacity in a private medical institution whose matter has been dealt with them either directly or indirectly. The NMC will frame policies and co-ordinate the activities of four autonomous boards, which includes - (i) Under-Graduate Medical Education Board (UGMEB),(ii) Post-Graduate Medical Education Board (PGMEB), (iii) Medical Assessment and Rating Board, (iv) Ethics and Medical Registration Board. According to the Central government, the NMC Act is a progressive legislation which will reduce the burden on students, ensure probity in medical education, bring down costs of medical education, simplify procedures, help to enhance the number of medical seats in India, ensure quality education, and provide wider access to people for quality healthcare. According to the government, the MCI had failed in almost all spheres and became highly ineffective. As one of the mandates of the NMC is to look at the cost of medical education, it will also provide for a common entrance examination for MBBS (NEET) along with common counselling for all medical institutions in the country. According to the health ministry, this provision will prevent seat blocking in parallel counselling processes and will eliminate the need for students to approach multiple colleges and take part in multiple counselling processes for admission. This will save students and their families from unnecessary physical and financial trauma. Under the NMC Act, the final year examination has been converted into a nationwide exit test called NEXT. This single examination will grant - i) a license to practice medicine, ii) an MBBS degree, and iii) entrance to postgraduate courses. There is a provision for common counselling for entrance to PG courses also. Students will be able to get admission to seats in all medical colleges and to institutes of national importance like AIIMS, PGI Chandigarh and JIPMER through a single counselling process. The Act does not impose any restriction on the number of attempts at NEXT examination. A singularly outstanding feature of the NMC Act is that it provides for the regulation of fees and all other charges in 50 per cent seats in private colleges as well as deemed to be universities as there was no provision to regulate fees in the Indian Medical Council Act 1956. According to the government, nearly 50 per cent of the total MBBS seats in the country are in government colleges, which have nominal fees. Of the remaining seats, 50 per cent would be regulated by NMC. This means that almost 75 per cent of total seats in the country would be available at reasonable fees. The government also informed that a provision has been made in the NMC Act to register some Community Health Providers (CHPs) who shall be modern medicine professionals with limited powers, however, they shall not be dealing with any alternative system of medicine. (ANI)
