= All India Pre Medical Test =

Medical entrance examination

- Acronym: AIPMT
- Type: Pen and Paper Based
- Administrator: National Testing Agency
- Purpose: admission to BDS and MBBS degree seats
- Regions: All India
- Languages: English

The All India Pre-Medical test/ Pre-Dental Entrance Test was an annual medical entrance examination in India. The exam was conducted by the Central Board of Secondary Education (CBSE) but has now been replaced by NEET-UG by the National Testing Agency.

The exam was a requirement for admission to MBBS and BDS degree programs in several medical colleges across the country. 15% of the total seats in all medical and dental colleges run by the Union of India, state governments, municipal or other local authorities in India, except in the states of Andhra Pradesh, Telangana and Jammu and Kashmir, were reserved for candidates who qualified for this examination.

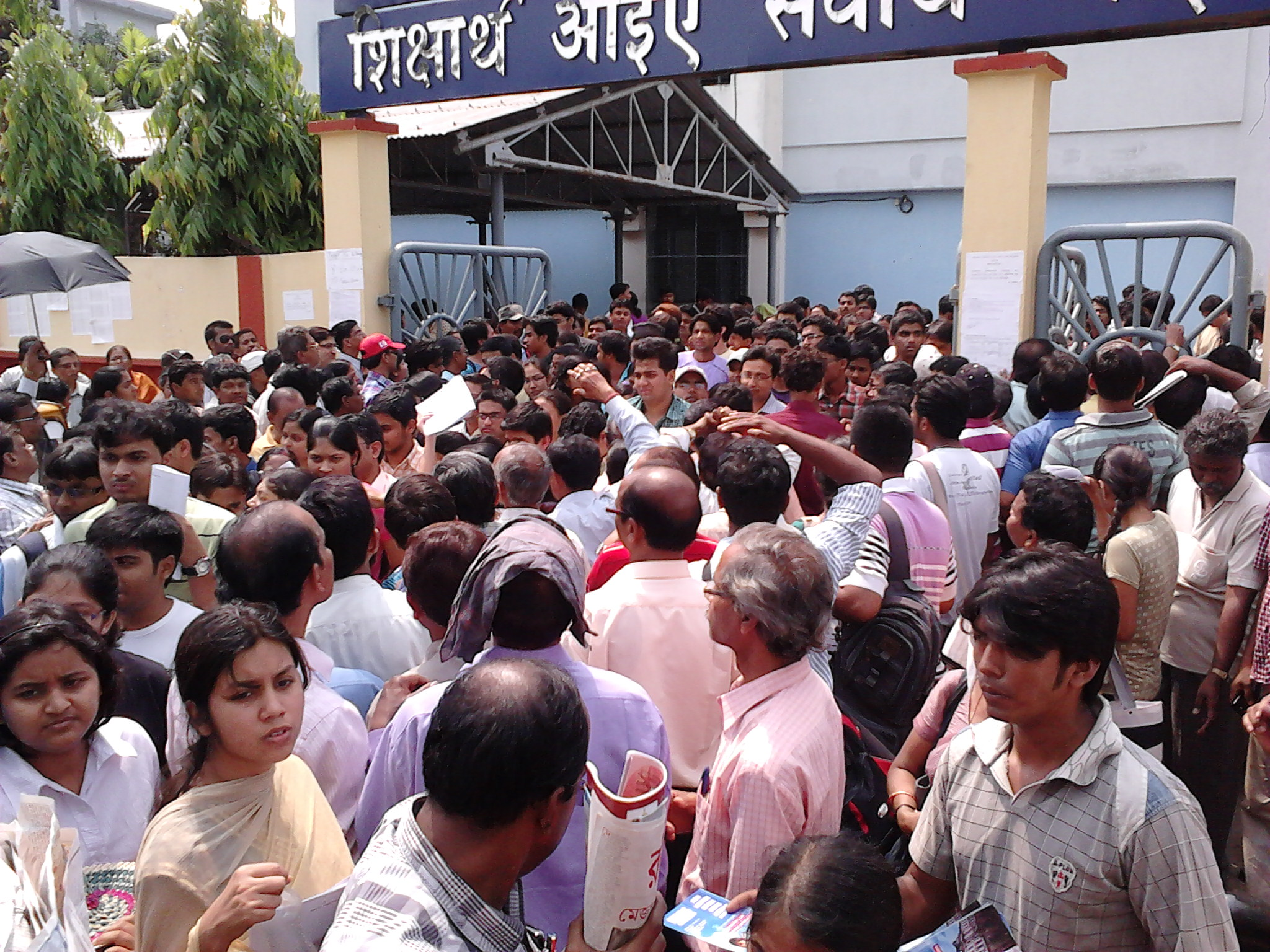
Examinees leaving the examination Centre at Kolkata, after completion of the AIPMT 2011 preliminary examination

== Conduct ==
The primary aim of this standardized nationwide test was to make medical education accessible on an equitable basis to all regions of the nation and to foster inter-regional exchange.

Every Year, AIPMT was conducted on the first Sunday in May. In 2016, AIPMT/NEET Phase-1 was conducted on 1 May 2016, and NEET Phase-2 was conducted on 24 July 2016.

Timeline of how AIPMT was scrapped

In 2012 - The Medical Council of India (MCI) and the Dental Council of India (DCI) conducted NEET for the admissions in UG and PG programmes in government and Private colleges in India. However, the exam was delayed by a year due to several reasons.

On 18 July 2013- The NEET Exam was scrapped by the Supreme Court in favor of 115 petitions. They also announced that private medical colleges should not conduct their own UG and PG exams based on the NEET.

Academic Session 2016-17 On 11 April, the Supreme Court decided to hear the case regarding the Medical Council of India. On 28 April 2016, the court announced that there would be only one common entrance test just before the 2 days of AIPMT, which is called the NEET Phase 1 exam.

On 18 April- In the session of 2016-17, the SC agreed to hold the NEET in 2 phases. Those candidates who did not appear in the phase 1 exam, AIPMT, will be considered in phase 2.

On 1 May- The CBSE conducted NEET phase 1, and almost 6 lakh candidates appeared in the exam.

On 25 May- The SC cleared all confusion that private colleges would no longer conduct separate exams for medical admissions.

On 9 May - The SC rejected the pleas filed by state governments and minority institutions to administer a separate entrance exam for MBBS and BDS courses for the current year as well.

On 20 May - The National Testing Agency came out to keep state government exams out of the field of the common test.

On 23 May - The Delhi govt finally decided to make NEET the only exam for admission to medical colleges.

On 24 May - The President of India finally signed an order to hold the common medical entrance exam for a year.

== Exam pattern ==
=== Exam changes ===
In 2010, the pattern of AIPMT was changed. A two-tier or two-stage test replaced the examination – the AIPMT Prelims and the AIPMT Mains, in which the AIPMT Prelims was an objective exam, and the AIPMT Mains was a subjective exam. Candidates who qualified for the AIPMT Prelims were eligible to take the AIPMT Mains test. Finally, those who scored well in the AIPMT Mains were selected for admission based purely on the merit of the candidate in the AIPMT Mains. Admission was done rank-wise.

In 2013, the pattern changed again - The two-tier examination was replaced by the National Eligibility cum Entrance Test (NEET-UG). It was a nationwide test through which admissions were to be done for all seats of MBBS and BDS in all the colleges which were covered by the previous exam.

From 2014 onwards, the exam was named AIPMT again, and done for 15% seats only, as was done earlier to National Eligibility cum Entrance Test (NEET-UG). See the current exam pattern below for more details.

=== Current exam pattern ===
The exam was conducted in a single stage, usually occurring on the first Sunday of May. Now, AIMPT has been cancelled due to the NEET examination. The examination consisted of one paper containing 180 objective-type questions from Physics, Chemistry and Biology (Botany & Zoology), with 45 questions from each subject. The exam duration was 3 hours, and each question carried 4 marks. For each incorrect response, one mark was deducted from the total score. Hence, negative marking played a large role. However, no deduction from the total score was made if no response was indicated for an item. Indication of more than one answer for a question was deemed an incorrect response and negatively marked.

=== AIPMT registration over time ===
The following graph shows the approximate number of registrations in the past two years:

Number of registrations in AIPMT over two years
Year	Approximate number of registrations
2015	5,210
2014	10,210

=== Number of Candidates for AIPMT over time ===
The following graph shows the approximate number of candidates appearing in the past two years:

Number of candidates for AIPMT over two years
Year	Approximate number of candidates
2015	500,000
2014	523,701

== AIPMT participating states and institutions ==
In 2015, 9 states and 4 medical institutions participated in AIPMT for filling their MBBS and BDS seats. The list of AIPMT 2015 participating states and institutions is:

=== Participating states ===
- Andaman & Nicobar
- Arunachal Pradesh
- Haryana
- Himachal Pradesh
- Maharashtra
- Manipur
- Meghalaya
- Odisha
- Rajasthan
- Tamil Nadu

In 2016, 8 states initially participated in AIPMT, but later it was converted into NEET-UG by the Supreme Court. Subsequently, many other states opted for the test. Bihar and Uttarakhand later opted for the test to fill their state seats in medical colleges.

- Haryana
- Himachal Pradesh
- Madhya Pradesh
- Manipur
- Meghalaya (subject to confirmation)
- Odisha
- Rajasthan
- Chandigarh (UT)

=== Participating institutes ===
- Armed Force Medical Services (Armed Forces Medical College (India))
- Banaras Hindu University
- Jamia Hamdard University
- University of Delhi

== Reservation ==
- (a) 15% seats are reserved for SC candidates,
- (b) 8% seats are reserved for ST candidates,
- (c) 27% seats are reserved for non-creamy layer OBC candidates

== Criticism ==
The AIPMT is criticized for being conducted only in English and Hindi, making it harder for students whose vernacular languages, such as Bengali, Tamil, Telugu, Kannada, Malayalam, Marathi or Gujarati are more prominent. For example, in September 2011, the Gujarat High Court acted on a Public Interest Litigation by the Gujarati Sahitya Parishad to conduct the exams in Gujarati. A second petition was made in October 2011.

== AIPMT 2015, 2016: The banning of scarves controversy ==
The AIPMT in 2015 had listed scarves in its banned items list, creating controversy and outrage, especially in the state of Kerala, where a nun was refused to appear for the test as she refused to remove her headgear. This comes after the Supreme Court upheld the CBSE's ban. The Kerala HC had permitted two Muslim girls to wear a headscarf and a full-sleeve dress on the condition that they be frisked if the invigilator deemed it necessary. However, in the case of Sister Seba, the official had disallowed it, even though she was ready for any frisking.

The AIPMT maintained the same norm in its 2016 instructions, sparking protests by the Campus Front of India in front of the CBSE office in Kerala on 13 April. The subsequent protest led to the detention of several girl protesters. Thus CBSE challenged a Kerala High Court single bench order and granted permission to Muslim girls to wear the Hijab for All India Pre-Medical Test 2016 Justice Muhammed Mushtaq had permitted all candidates who want to wear headscarf and full sleeved length dress to appear for the examination but on a condition that they would be present at the hall half an hour before the exam for frisking, if necessary by women invigilators The order was issued while hearing a petition for changing the dress code

== AIPMT 2015 paper leak ==
In AIPMT 2015 (3 May 2015), Haryana (Rohtak) police caught four people, including two dentists and an MBBS student, from Rohtak for allegedly passing on answer keys of AIPMT 2015 Exam to candidates during the exam, using vests with SIM card units and conducted on 3 May 2015. Later, the results were rescheduled to be declared on June 12, 2015. On 15 June 2015, the Supreme Court asked CBSE to re-conduct the AIPMT 2015 Exam within 4 weeks (by 12 July 2015). After a hearing on the pleas of CBSE, the Supreme Court decided to re-conduct the exam on 25 July 2015. The exam was conducted safely and successfully across the country on the scheduled date (25 July 2015). The result of Re-AIPMT was declared on 17 August 2015.

== See also ==
- The National Council for Human Resource in Health in India
- Health in India
