= Foreign Medical Graduate Examination =

Doctors' qualifying examination

The Foreign Medical Graduate Examination (FMGE), is a licensure examination conducted by the National Board of Examinations in Medical Sciences (NBEMS) in India.

The test is one of the mandatory requirements for an Indian citizen who has a medical degree from a college outside India to practice medicine in the country. The screening test was introduced in 2002 as a qualifying examination for Indian students obtaining their medical degrees from countries other than India, such as China, Bangladesh, Nepal, Mauritius, Philippines, Eastern European, Central Asian and Caribbean countries.

Indian doctors holding basic medical degrees from the above countries have to take the MCI screening test. The Medical School should have been listed in the WHO international directory of Medical Schools (Now The World Directory of Medical Schools). Candidates who qualify the Screening Test may apply to the National Medical Commission of India or to any Indian State Medical Council for provisional registration or permanent registration.

The legality of the test was challenged in the Indian courts and was upheld by the Supreme Court of India in 2009. This test has generated controversy with accusations that it is unfair and lacks transparency—for example, not allowing examinees to retain their question paper after examination, or not showing the exact marks or answer sheet upon appeal for failure. An appeal petition filed under RTI India to reveal the marks of an appealing student was not granted.

This examination is held twice in year in June and December on the third Monday and Tuesday of the month.

The National Medical Commission (which replaced the Medical Council of India in 2020) released draft regulations in 2021 on foreign medical graduates (FMGs) that amends the requirement for the Screening Test. Starting in 2022, overseas graduates will be required to qualify the new National Exit Test (NExT) in place of the Foreign Medical Graduate Exam (FMGE). Candidates intending to practice in India will have to clear NExT, within two years of completing their medical studies abroad. The draft regulation is expected to become official when published in the next gazette.

== Results ==
Success rates vary considerably depending on the Medical School and countries of training.

For the 2025 sessions, the top three pass rates for countries where at least 50 candidates were trained were Mauritius, Uzbekistan and Bangladesh for the June session and Serbia, Moldova and Mauritius for the December session.

== See also ==
- Compulsory Rotating Medical Internship
- National Medical Commission
- National Eligibility and Entrance Test
- The National Council for Human Resource in Health in India
- Educational Commission for Foreign Medical Graduates
