= Medical college in India =

In India, a medical college is an educational institution that provides medical education. These institutions may vary from stand-alone colleges that train doctors to conglomerates that offer training related in all aspects of medical care. The term is synonymous with "medical school" as used in the US and some other countries. MBBS is a degree in medicine established by Indian Medical Council Act 1956 and continued in National Medical Commission Act 2019. After MBBS, doctors register with state medical councils.

== Recognition ==
Indian law requires these institutions to be recognized by the National Medical Commission, which replaced the Medical Council of India (MCI) in 2019. The Indian government keeps an updated list of these approved medical colleges. Many persons without MBBS degrees practice like doctors in India. They are called quacks. According to National Medical Commission Act 2019, punishment for quackery has been enhanced to up to 1 year imprisonment and up to INR 5 lakh fine.

== Admissions and education ==
The standard entry-to-practice degree in modern medicine in India is the Bachelor of Medicine and Bachelor of Surgery (MBBS), earned upon completion of a five-and-a-half-year undergraduate program. The curriculum is divided into one year of preclinical studies in general science subjects and three and a half years of paraclinical and clinical studies, followed by a one-year clinical internship. Before beginning the internship, students are required to pass several examinations, the final one of which is conducted in two parts. Graduate education in medical science typically takes three additional years of study after the MBBS and concludes with the award of the Master of Surgery or Doctor of Medicine. Postgraduate diplomas in medical specializations may also be awarded upon completing two-year training programs.

== Medical college ==
According to the World Federation for Medical Education, India is the country with the greatest quantity of operational medical schools (550). A list of schools by region is provided below:

=== By region (2013) ===
S.No	Regions	List of Medical college	Number of Colleges offering MBBS	State-run Colleges	Private Colleges	Govt. college seats	Private College Seats	Total no. of seats
SI	South India		154	52	102	6830	13705	20535
WI	West India		77	34	43	4540	5295	9835
NI	North India		70	37	33	4499	3745	8244
EI	East India		47	37	10	4116	1010	5026
T	Total		348	160	188	19985	23755	43640

== National rankings ==
The National Institutional Ranking Framework (NIRF), released annually by India's Ministry of Education, ranks medical colleges based on five parameters: Teaching, Learning & Resources (30%), Research & Professional Practice (30%), Graduation Outcomes (20%), Outreach & Inclusivity (10%), and Perception (10%).

NIRF Ranking (2025) of Medical Colleges in India
Rank	Name	City	State/UT	NIRF Score	Budget	Ownership	Institutional classification
1	All India Institute of Medical Sciences (AIIMS, New Delhi)	New Delhi	Delhi	91.80	₹5,500.92 crore (US$570 million)	Government of India	Public
2	Postgraduate Institute of Medical Education and Research (PGIMER, Chandigarh)	Chandigarh	Chandigarh	82.58	₹2,504.65 crore (US$260 million)	Government of India	Public
3	Christian Medical College (CMC, Vellore)	Vellore	Tamil Nadu	76.48	₹1,738 crore (US$180 million)	CMC Vellore Association	Private
▲4	Jawaharlal Institute of Postgraduate Medical Education and Research (JIPMER, Puducherry)	Pondichéry	Puducherry	73.30	₹1,496.46 crore (US$160 million)	Government of India	Public
▲5	Sanjay Gandhi Postgraduate Institute of Medical Sciences (SGPGIMS, Lucknow)	Lucknow	Uttar Pradesh	70.09	₹1,160.5 crore (US$120 million)	Government of Uttar Pradesh	Public
▲6	Institute of Medical Sciences (IMS-BHU, Varanasi)	Varanasi	Uttar Pradesh	70.05	—N/a	Government of India	Public
▼7	National Institute of Mental Health and Neurosciences (NIMHANS, Bengaluru)	Bengaluru	Karnataka	69.77	₹917.21 crore (US$95 million)	Government of India	Public
▲8	King George's Medical University (KGMU, Lucknow)	Lucknow	Uttar Pradesh	68.77	₹1,640 crore (US$170 million)	Government of Uttar Pradesh	Public
▼9	Amrita Vishwa Vidyapeetham	Coimbatore	Tamil Nadu	68.52	—N/a	—N/a	Private
▼10	Kasturba Medical College	Manipal	Karnataka	68.05	—N/a	—N/a	Private
▲11	Saveetha Institute of Medical and Technical Sciences	Chennai	Tamil Nadu	66.50	—N/a	—N/a	Private
▼12	Dr. D. Y. Patil Medical College, Hospital & Research Centre	Pune	Maharashtra	65.17	—N/a	—N/a	Private
▲13	All India Institute of Medical Sciences, Rishikesh (AIIMS, Rishikesh)	Rishikesh	Uttarakhand	65.02	—N/a	Government of India	Public
▲14	All India Institute of Medical Sciences, Bhubaneswar (AIIMS, Bhubaneswar)	Khordha	Odisha	64.31	—N/a	Government of India	Public
▲15	Siksha 'O' Anusandhan	Bhubaneswar	Odisha	63.73	—N/a		Private
▼16	Madras Medical College	Chennai	Tamil Nadu	63.71	—N/a	Government of Tamil Nadu	Public
▼17	Sree Chitra Tirunal Institute for Medical Sciences and Technology	Thiruvananthapuram	Kerala	63.36	—N/a	Government of India	Public
18	SRM Institute of Science and Technology	Chennai	Tamil Nadu	63.22	—N/a		Private
▼19	All India Institute of Medical Sciences, Jodhpur	Jodhpur	Rajasthan	63.18	—N/a	Government of India	Public
▲20	Datta Meghe Institute of Higher Education and Research	Wardha	Maharashtra	62.37	—N/a		Private
▼21	Sri Ramachandra Institute of Higher Education and Research	Chennai	Tamil Nadu	61.62	—N/a		Private
▼22	Vardhman Mahavir Medical College	New Delhi	Delhi	61.50	₹2,179.58 crore (US$230 million)	Government of India	Public
▼23	Institute of Post Graduate Medical Education & Research (IPGMER, Kolkata)	Kolkata	West Bengal	61.07	₹970.23 crore (US$100 million)	Government of West Bengal	Public
▲24	Kalinga Institute of Industrial Technology	Bhubaneswar	Odisha	61.00	—N/a		Private
▲25	All India Institute of Medical Sciences, Bhopal (AIIMS, Bhopal)	Bhopal	Madhya Pradesh	60.15	—N/a	Government of India	Public
▼26	Maulana Azad Medical College	New Delhi	Delhi	59.47	—N/a	Government of Delhi	Public
▼27	All India Institute of Medical Sciences, Patna	Patna	Bihar	59.24	—N/a	Government of India	Public
▲28	Institute of Liver and Biliary Sciences	New Delhi	Delhi	59.22	—N/a	Government of Delhi	Public
▼29	Aligarh Muslim University	Aligarh	Uttar Pradesh	58.82	₹1,036 crore (US$110 million)	Government of India	Public
▼30	St. John's Medical College	Bengaluru	Karnataka	58.74	—N/a		Private

== Statistics ==
Yearwise Medical colleges Numbers in chart

View source data.

Note: Mar 16, 2023 Data

=== By state ===
S.No	State / UT	Number of Colleges	Govt. Colleges	Private Colleges	Govt. college seats	Govt. college seats per million pop.	Private College Seats	Total no. of seats
1	Andhra Pradesh	31	13	18	2410	49	2800	5210
2	Assam	13	13	0	1600	51	0	1600
3	Arunachal Pradesh	1	1	0	50	36	0	
4	Bihar	11	11	2	-	-	-	
4	Chandigarh	1	1	0	150	142	0	150
5	Chhattisgarh	10	7	3	895	35	450	1345
6	Delhi	10	8	2	1222	73	200	1422
7	Goa	1	1	0	180	123	0	180
8	Gujarat	31	18	13	3700	61	2000	5700
9	Haryana	12	5	7	710	28	950	1660
10	Himachal Pradesh	8	7	1	770	112	150	920
11	Jammu and Kashmir	10	9	1	1035	84	100	1135
12	Jharkhand	8	7	1	630	19	150	780
13	Karnataka	60	19	41	2900	47	6445	9345
14	Kerala	31	10	21	1555	47	2550	4105
15	Madhya Pradesh	23	14	9	2135	29	1450	3585
16	Maharashtra	57	26	31	4430	39	4570	9000
17	Manipur	2	2	0	225	88	0	225
18	Mizoram	1	1	0	100	91	0	100
19	Odisha	12	8	4	1250	30	700	1950
20	Puducherry	9	2	7	380	304	1150	1530
21	Punjab	10	4	6	650	23	775	1425
22	Rajasthan	24	16	8	2900	42	1300	4200
23	Sikkim	1	0	1	0	0	50	50
24	Tamil Nadu	62	36	26	3650	51	4350	8000
25	Telangana	34	11	23	1790	51	3450	5240
26	Tripura	2	1	1	125	34	100	225
27	Uttar Pradesh	57	26	31	3178	16	4250	7428
28	Uttarakhand	6	4	2	525	52	300	825
29	West Bengal	26	20	6	3150	35	850	4000
T	Total	558	289	269	43435	36	39840	83275
