= National Board of Examinations in Medical Sciences =

Board governing medical licensure in India

Agency overview
- Formed: 1975; 51 years ago
- Type: Autonomous body
- Jurisdiction: India
- Status: Active
- Headquarters: New Delhi; 28°34′40″N 77°03′39″E
- Parent Ministry: Ministry of Health and Family Welfare President: Dr.Abhijat Sheth, NBEMS Executive director: Dr. Minu Bajpai, NBEMS
- Website: www.natboard.edu.in

National Board of Examinations in Medical Sciences (NBEMS) is an autonomous body under the Ministry of Health and Family Welfare, Government of India, and established in 1975 at New Delhi as a Society under Delhi Society registration act, to standardizing postgraduate medical education and examination in India.

The postgraduate degree awarded by the National Board of Examinations is called the Diplomate of National Board (DNB) for specialty and Doctorate of National Board (DrNB) for superspecialty. The list of recognised qualifications awarded by the Board in various specialties and super-specialties are approved by the Government of India and are included in the First Schedule of Indian Medical Council Act, 1956. The National Board of Examinations conducts the largest portfolio of examinations in the field of medicine in India.

== FMGE screening tests ==
- Foreign Medical Graduate Examination (FMGE) for Indians graduated from foreign countries to practice in India
- Foreign Dental Screening Test (FDST) for Indians holding BDS or MDS/PG Diploma to practice in India
  - FSDT (BDS)
  - FSDT (MDS & PGD)

The screening test is governed by the screening test regulations as notified by the Medical Council of India with previous approval of Central Government of India and the judgments of the Supreme Court of India.

A section of Foreign Medical Graduates (FMGs) had been protesting, demanding compensatory/grace marks primarily over two issues:

- Video-based questions: Candidates argued that the introduction of 14 video-based questions (out of 300) and alleged lack of familiarity with the format disadvantaged them.
- Examination centre conditions: Some candidates reported issues like inadequate ventilation and high temperatures at certain centres, claiming these affected performance.

NBEMS has rejected the demand for grace/compensatory marks, while noting that there is scope for meaningful improvements in future examinations (e.g., better communication, interface familiarisation, and centre infrastructure).

== Examinations ==
The National Board of Examinations in Medical Sciences conducts the following examinations:

=== Entrance exams ===
- NEET-PG for admission to MD/MS/DNB postgraduate medical courses across India
- NEET-MDS for admission to postgraduate dental courses across India
- NEET-SS for admission to DM/Mch/DrNB superspecialty medical courses across India
- Fellowship Entrance Test (FET) for admission to Fellow of National Board (FNB)/Fellow of National Board - Post Doctoral (FNB-PD) courses.
- DNB-PDCET for admission to various post diploma DNB courses in broad specialty subjects.
- Graduate Pharmacy Aptitude Test (GPAT) for admission to M. Pharm.

=== Exit exams ===
- DNB/DrNB – Final, exit examination leading to the award of DNB/DrNB.
- FNB Exit, exit examination leading to the award of FNB/FNB-PD.

== NBEMS Contact ==
The NBEMS Contact Centre remains operational from 09.30am to 6:00pm on all working Monday to Friday. The Contact Number is +91-11-45593000. Address:Ring Road, Mahatma Gandhi Rd, Medical Enclave, Ansari Nagar East, New Delhi, Delhi 110029.

== See also ==
- The National Council for Human Resource in Health in India
- All India Institute of Medical Sciences
- Medical Council of India Screening Test
- Compulsory Rotating Medical Internship
- Paper leak in India also known as Exam Mafia
