= 2026 Delhi Jantar Mantar protests =

Protests led by the Cockroach Janta Party in New Delhi

- Indian Gen Z protests Cockroach protests Part of the Gen Z protests in Asia
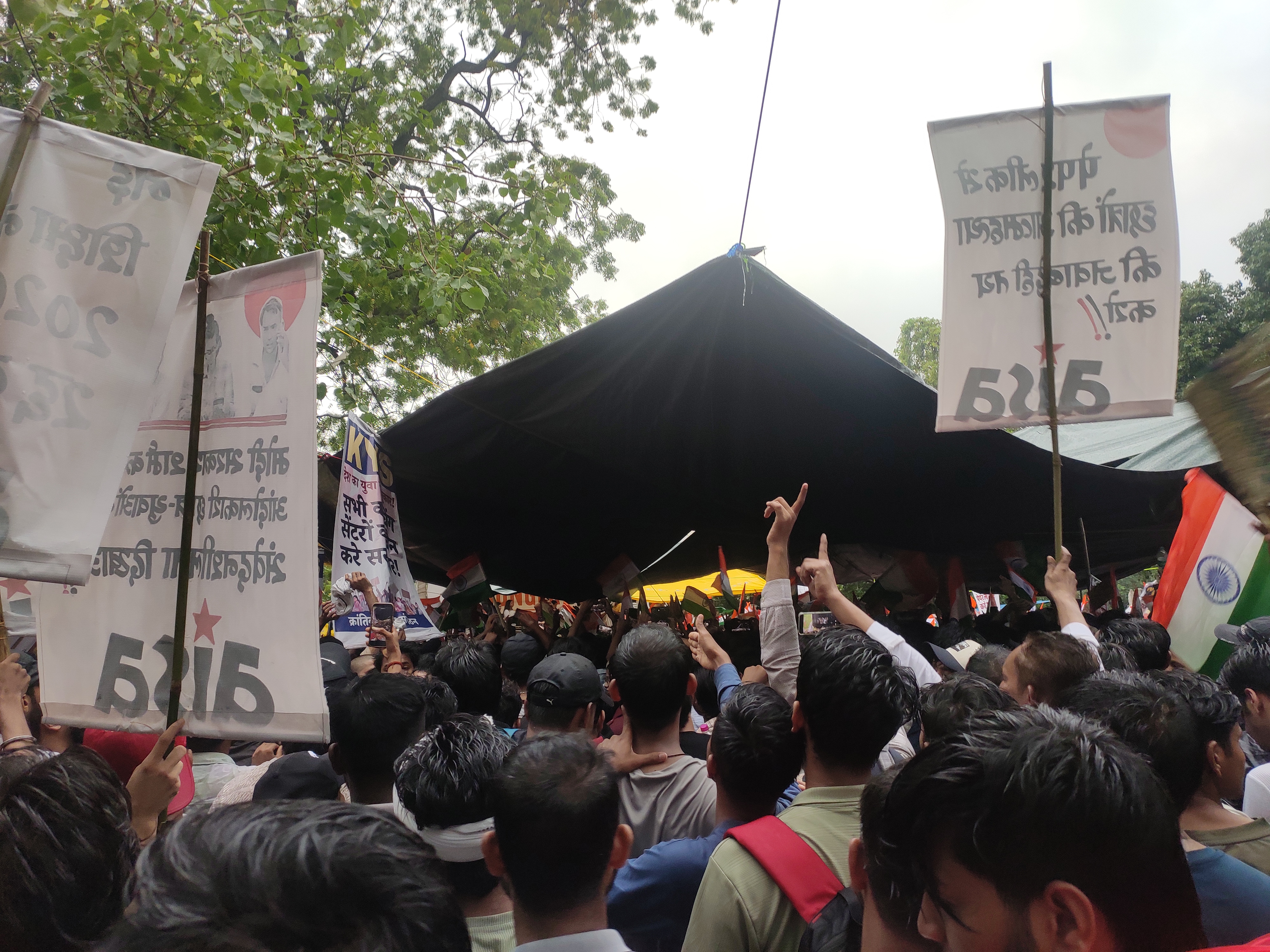
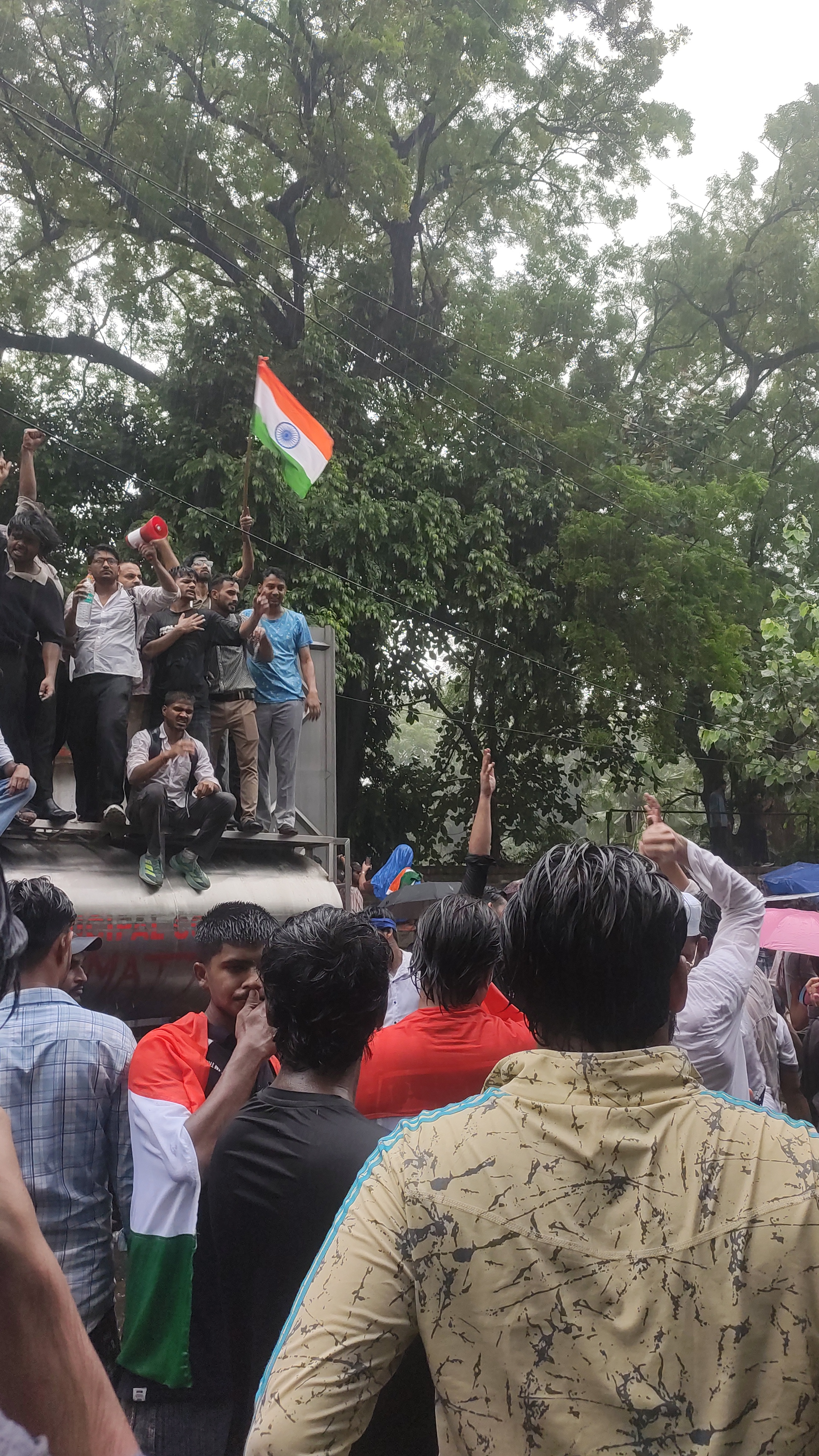
- Date: 6 June 2026 – 25 July 2026 (1 month and 19 days)
- Location: Jantar Mantar, New Delhi, India (Note: smaller protests also occurred in other cities)
- Caused by: 2026 NEET paper leak and related student suicides; CBSE On-Screen Marking irregularities; Repeated lapses in public examination administration over several decades, resulting in widespread paper leaks
- Goals: Resignation of Union Education Minister Dharmendra Pradhan; Reforms in the examination system and the overall education system
- Methods: Demonstrations (Sansad Chalo march), sit-ins, hunger strikes, vandalism
- Result: Protests successful: Resignation of Minister of Education Dharmendra Pradhan; Government assures of withdrawing cases against protesters and compensation to the families of students who committed suicide; Passage of Public Examinations (Prevention of Unfair Means) Amendment Act, 2026

Parties
- Government of India
  - Ministry of Education
  - Ministry of Home Affairs
    - Delhi Police
    - Central Reserve Police Force
      - Rapid Action Force
Supported by:
- Bharatiya Janata Party
- Rashtriya Swayamsevak Sangh
- Cockroach Janta Party
- All India Students' Federation
- Students' Federation of India
- All India Students' Association
- Krantikari Yuva Sangathan
Supported by:
- Communist Party of India
- Communist Party of India (Marxist)
- Communist Party of India (Marxist–Leninist) Liberation
- All India Forward Bloc
- Revolutionary Socialist Party
- Socialist Unity Centre of India (Communist)
- Aam Aadmi Party
- Dravida Munnetra Kazhagam
- Rashtriya Janata Dal
- Samajwadi Party
- Aazad Samaj Party (Kanshi Ram)
- Jammu and Kashmir Peoples Democratic Party
- Indian National Congress
- Nationalist Congress Party – Sharadchandra Pawar
- Vanchit Bahujan Aaghadi
- Viduthalai Chiruthaigal Katchi
- Bahujan Samaj Party
- Shiromani Akali Dal
- Thiyya Vamsham
- Tamilaga Vettri Kazhagam
- Maharashtra Navnirman Sena
- Jammu & Kashmir National Conference
- Indian National Lok Dal
- Shiv Sena (Uddhav Balasaheb Thackeray)
- All India Majlis-e-Ittehadul Muslimeen
- All India Trinamool Congress
- We the Leader Foundation

Lead figures
Narendra Modi; Amit Shah; Dharmendra Pradhan	Sonam Wangchuk; Abhijeet Dipke; Neha Bora; Adarsh M. Saji; Aishe Ghosh; Viraaj Devang

Casualties
- Injuries: 118 police personnel (official claim); 100+ protesters (hospital sources)

A series of demonstrations took place in Jantar Mantar, New Delhi, India, between 6 June and 25 July 2026. They were initiated by the Cockroach Janta Party (CJP), an Indian youth-based satirical political movement, along with left-wing student organisations including the All India Students Federation, All India Students Association, and Students' Federation of India. Held primarily at Jantar Mantar in New Delhi, the protesters have demanded the resignation of Union Education Minister Dharmendra Pradhan over irregularities in several of that year's national examinations — the 2026 NEET paper leak and the CBSE On-Screen Marking irregularities — along with broader reforms in the conduct of public examinations. The CJP, along with the Congress party, also sought compensation for the families of students who died by suicide due to the examination turmoil. The agitation drew national attention after activist Sonam Wangchuk began an indefinite hunger strike at the protest site on 28 June.

The CJP had been created in May 2026 by digital communications strategist Abhijeet Dipke as a political satire, alluding to a statement by Surya Kant, the Chief Justice of India, who compared unemployed youth and social media activists to "cockroaches" and "parasites". Having gained widespread online popularity, the movement transitioned into offline demonstrations, which were initially permitted by the Delhi Police.

On 28 June 2026, Ladakhi environmentalist and education activist Sonam Wangchuk joined the demonstration at Jantar Mantar. He started an indefinite hunger strike and demanded the resignation of Dharmendra Pradhan.

In mid-July 2026, following a leadership change in the Delhi Police, police removed barricades at the protest site and transferred Wangchuk to a hospital, a move organisers claimed was done against his will. This action, along with an incident where a woman who chanted Hindutva slogans and threw ink at Dipke, drew increased media attention to the agitation.

On 20 July, thousands of protesters, comprising primarily students and Gen Z congregants, gathered near Jantar Mantar, defying orders from the Delhi Police to disperse, and began to march toward Parliament. Clashes ensued, with police using baton charges and tear gas against protesters in an attempt to prevent them from reaching the Parliament, where the monsoon session was underway. International media outlets, including France 24 and CNN, described the protests as the largest demonstrations against the country's government in several years, while the Delhi Police stated their actions were necessary to maintain public order. Following the police response, CJP leaders announced the movement would not organise further street marches in the capital, though the sit-in at Jantar Mantar and the campaign for Pradhan's resignation would continue.

Following the crackdown, the Delhi Police dismantled the protesters' tents at the designated site, though demonstrators quickly began rebuilding their camps amidst rain and rubble.

On 23 July 2026, Wangchuk ended his hunger strike after the government assured him that no legal action would be taken against protesters rallying at Jantar Mantar site, a discussion would be held on preventing paper leaks in future and compensation would be given to students who committed suicide. Pradhan resigned on 25 July 2026. The protests were called off later in the day after the government agreed to the CJP's demands.

== Background ==
=== Formation of the Cockroach Janta Party ===
Logo of the Cockroach Janta Party

In May 2026, Surya Kant, the Chief Justice of India, drew criticism for remarks made during a Supreme Court hearing in which he compared the unemployed youth to "cockroaches" and "parasites" who attack institutions through social media activism and litigation.

There are already parasites of society who attack the system, and you want to join hands with them? There are youngsters like cockroaches; they don't get any employment, and they don't have any place in a profession. Some of them become media, some of them become social media, some of them become RTI activists, some of them become other activists, and they start attacking everyone [...] And you people file contempt petitions.

The remarks drew widespread public criticism. On 16 May 2026, digital communications strategist Abhijeet Dipke founded the Cockroach Janta Party (CJP; Cockroach People's Party). Its name is a direct reference to Kant's remarks. The movement rapidly gained a large social media following. Kant later clarified that his criticism was directed at individuals who had entered the legal, media, and activist professions using fraudulent academic credentials, and that he respected the youth.

=== Scandals ===
The protests followed two examination-related scandals in 2026: a paper leak affecting the NEET-UG medical entrance examination and irregularities in the Central Board of Secondary Education's on-screen marking and revaluation process, which left thousands of students awaiting clarity on their final results.

== Timeline ==
=== May ===
==== 3 May 2026 ====
- The National Eligibility cum Entrance Test (NEET-UG) 2026 was conducted across India.

==== 12 May 2026 ====
- The National Testing Agency (NTA), with the approval of the Government of India, cancelled the NEET-UG 2026 examination following allegations of a question paper leak and referred the matter to the Central Bureau of Investigation (CBI) for investigation.

=== June ===
==== 1 June 2026 ====
Members of the All India Students' Association (AISA) and Krantikari Yuva Sangathan (KYS) protested outside the Ministry of Education in New Delhi against the alleged NEET paper leak, irregularities in the CBSE Class 12 examinations and CUET, and demanded accountability from the government.

==== 6 June ====
- Abhijeet Dipke arrives from the United States to India, launching the CJP's first street protest.

==== 7–19 June ====
- The movement transitions into periodic sit-ins, digital campaigns, and awareness drives across Delhi.

==== 20 June ====
- Demonstrators regroup at Jantar Mantar for extended mobilisation.

==== 21 June ====
- Dipke issues a public appeal for NEET aspirants to join the venue following re-examination.

==== 22–27 June ====
- Protests gain widespread attention on social networking sites.

==== 28 June ====
- Prominent Ladakhi environmentalist and engineer Sonam Wangchuk joins the protest, declaring an indefinite hunger strike alongside six students of the All India Students Association (AISA), demanding the resignation of Dharmendra Pradhan, the Union Minister of Education.

==== 30 June ====
- CJP launches nationwide 'Pradhan Go Back' campaign.

=== July ===
==== 1–17 July ====
- CJP protests gain support from opposition parties, garnering widespread public support, especially for Sonam Wangchuk's hunger strike.

==== 18 July ====
- Sonam Wangchuk is removed from the protest site by police; Rahul Gandhi, Leader of the Opposition in the Lok Sabha, criticises the action.
- Abhijeet Dipke and others start an indefinite hunger strike in protest of his removal.

==== 20 July ====
- Tens of thousands of protesters gather at Jantar Mantar and attempt to march toward the Parliament House. CJP representatives Ashutosh Ranka and Saurav Das meet Union Health Minister J. P. Nadda to present demands, including the release of Wangchuk, the resignation of Dharmendra Pradhan, and financial compensation of ₹1 crore (10 million rupees, equivalent to US$103,534) for families of deceased NEET aspirants.
- Security forces used baton charges and tear gas to disperse protesters attempting to march towards the Parliament through police barricades. Gurdwara Bangla Sahib became a refuge for several such students and protesters fleeing batons and teargas.
- Some protesters clashed with the Delhi Police and engaged in stone-pelting. The Delhi Police stated that it would register first information reports (FIR) against protesters who engaged in violence.
- Delhi Police stated that at least 118 personnel were hurt and between 15–20 government vehicles were damaged during the protests.
- Hospital authorities and police sources reported that around 60 protesters were injured. Ram Manohar Lohia Hospital alone recorded 65 medico-legal cases involving both protesters and police by 7 pm.
- According to the CJP, one party member suffered a broken leg during interactions with Delhi Police.
- Three of the AISA activists who had joined Wangchuk's hunger strike on 28 June ended their fast on 20 July, while Wangchuk continued his own fast at Safdarjung Hospital.
- Following the removal of the stage and tents, protesters returned to Jantar Mantar during the night of 20–21 July and began rebuilding the protest infrastructure.
- According to CJP leaders, around 150 protesters were hospitalised and roughly 70 were detained.
- An additional district commissioner of police (DCP), later identified as Sandeep Lamba, was witnessed and recorded slapping a woman. Lamba's assault on the female protestor, footage of which was later circulated widely, was cited in a public interest litigation on the disproportionate usage of force by police in a hearing currently underway in the Delhi High Court. Saket Gokhale, former Rajya Sabha MP, lodged a complaint seeking the registration of an FIR against Lamba.

==== 21 July ====
- Protesters reclaimed the Jantar Mantar protest site after police cleared the stage and tents during Monday's demonstrations.
- Vijeta Dahiya, the CJP spokesperson, was removed from his position after taking a fast food break while protesters and party members were clashing with police.
- The Delhi High Court ordered Sonam Wangchuk to be shifted immediately from Safdarjung hospital to Medanta Hospital in Gurugram.
  "Having regard to the submissions made by learned Counsel for the Parties and the opinions given and concerns expressed by the doctors present, we are of the opinion that husband of the Appellant ought to be shifted to a hospital of his choice. During the hearing of this matter before this Court yesterday as also today, on behalf of the Appellant it has been stated that husband of the Appellant can be medically taken care of at Medanta Hospital, Gurugram ("Medanta Hospital"), which is the hospital of his choice."
  — "Gitanjali J. Angmo vs. Union of India & Ors" (PDF), Delhi High Court, 21 July 2026, archived from the original (PDF) on 21 July 2026
- Congress MPs led by Congress president Mallikarjun Kharge and Leader of Opposition in the Lok Sabha Rahul Gandhi, alongside leaders from other opposition parties, protested outside Prime Minister Narendra Modi's residence demanding answers regarding the police actions during the march.
- Police subsequently detained Rahul Gandhi along with other opposition leaders outside the PM's residence and released a few hours later.
- CJP announced their intent to conduct a protest at the Delhi Police headquarters if the detained protesters were not released, while the Delhi Police stated that no protesters were detained during the march.
- Demonstrations were held by Hindus for Human Rights in New York City and San Jose, California, to express solidarity with Wangchuk. Similar solidarity demonstrations were also held outside the Indian High Commission in London and the Indian Embassy in Dublin.
- Volunteers and supporters donated food and water supplies for the demonstrators at Jantar Mantar. Food deliveries and supplies from supporters in India and abroad were being collected by volunteers near police barricades and distributed among protesters at the site. Medical volunteers who had been at the site for a month were also present to treat wounded and sick protesters.
- A panel consisting of Chief Justice D.K. Upadhyaya and Justice Tejas Karia of the Delhi High Court declined an urgent student hearing following what petitioners termed the police's disproportionate and excessive use of force against protesters, stating "Don't drag us into it."

==== 22 July ====
- The protests spread to many other cities of India, including in Mumbai, Chandigarh, Surat, Patna, Bengaluru, Hyderabad, Kerala, Lucknow and Kolkata.
- Chief Justice of India Surya Kant rejected an urgent hearing on a petition alleging Delhi Police brutality against the student protesters during the 20 July march, telling the petitioner to not waste their time, as the court said it would not review the cited videos allegedly documenting a disproportionate police response.
- The Delhi Metro Rail Corporation (DMRC) temporarily closed down 16 metro stations across Central Delhi as authorities widened security measures.
- A total of 20 Central Reserve Police Force (CRPF) companies were airlifted from Kolkata to be deployed in Delhi after the Ministry of Home Affairs ordered their immediate deployment in the national capital on Tuesday night.
- Thousands of CJP supporters continued to protest in the capital despite heavy rains overnight.
- Wangchuk, in a letter addressed to Union Ministers J.P. Nadda and Jitendra Singh Rana, said he would end his indefinite hunger strike if the Union Government gave an unequivocal assurance that no punitive or retaliatory action would be taken against students and youth who participated in the protest against alleged examination irregularities. He set this out as the last of three conditions communicated in the letter, the other two being government acknowledgement of compensation for the families of students who died by suicide following the NEET-UG paper leak, and a substantive parliamentary discussion on accountability for the examination failures, including consideration of Pradhan's resignation; Nadda and Singh had reportedly indicated during an earlier meeting at Medanta Hospital that the government would positively consider these first two demands. Around 65 opposition members of Parliament, including John Brittas, Shashi Tharoor, Ram Gopal Yadav, Sagarika Ghose and Kapil Sibal, separately wrote to Wangchuk asking him to withdraw his fast, pledging to press the government not to take coercive action against protesters while taking up the education debate in Parliament; Wangchuk thanked the MPs in his reply.
- Two assistant commissioners of police (ACPs) and four other police personnel were reported to have been injured in stone-pelting allegedly by protesters near Jantar Mantar during the evening.

==== 23 July ====
- The DMRC stated that 17 metro stations across Delhi would remain closed until further notice.
- Both houses of Parliament were repeatedly adjourned, marking the fourth consecutive day of disruption since the Monsoon session began. The opposition maintained that Pradhan should resign before any discussion, while the government said it was willing to debate the issue without preconditions.
- The Students' Federation of India (SFI) held solidarity protests across Kerala over the police crackdown on student demonstrators in Delhi, while the Kerala Students Union (KSU) observed an educational bandh.
- Prime Minister Narendra Modi announced creation of fast-track courts to expedite paper leak cases. The Delhi High Court set up a fast-track court to try paper leak cases a few hours after the announcement, the court will try the cases under Public Examinations (Prevention of Unfair Means) Act, 2024.
- While the central government offered to hold talks with the protesting groups, with union minister Jitendra Singh Rana stating that it had sent four proposals since 22 July, the protest leaders demanded that talks be held at Jantar Mantar or at a neutral venue.
- Sonam Wangchuk broke his fast after 26 days in presence of J.P. Nadda and Jitendra Singh Rana, following written assurances given by the government to take back cases against non-violent protesters, hold discussions on preventing paper leaks and give suitable compensation to families of students who are suicide victims.

==== 24 July ====
- Dipke announced that the protest will continue until the resignation of Dharmendra Pradhan despite Wangchuk ending his fast.
- The Ministry of External Affairs dismissed allegations of foreign funding to the Cockroach Janta Party, which is leading student protests at Jantar Mantar and elsewhere in the country. "I have no information to share on this issue with you," said spokesperson Randhir Jaiswal during a press briefing in response to a question on the funding of the protest.
- The DMRC stated that 18 metro stations would remain closed on 24 July in view of the security situation.

==== 25 July ====
- The DMRC announced closure of 18 metro stations for the fourth consecutive day.
- Dharmendra Pradhan resigned. In a letter addressed to his "young friends", Pradhan said that he has sent his resignation to Prime Minister Narendra Modi, considering the situation that has developed at Jantar Mantar and across the country. He further took moral responsibility for the developments surrounding the medical entrance examination while defending the government's handling of the crisis.
- A Special Commissioner of Police and two other police officers were injured in stone-pelting according to the Delhi Police, following which it resorted to lathi charge and tear gas to disperse the protesters clashing with the police.
- CJP called off the protests during a joint press conference with J.P. Nadda and Jitendra Singh Rana, stating that the government had agreed that police cases filed against protesters would be withdrawn in all NDA-ruled states and no action would be taken against them in the future, while maximum compensation would be given to students who committed suicide per the rules.

== Protests ==
=== First protest at Jantar Mantar ===
The CJP held its first street protest at Jantar Mantar, New Delhi on 6 June 2026, to demand the resignation of Dharmendra Pradhan, the union minister of education; it was the first major demonstration at Jantar Mantar since the 2023 Indian wrestlers' protest. The Delhi Police granted permission for the protest until 5 P.M. in what they described as a one-time exception. The police deployed around 5,000 personnel in the New Delhi district and strengthened their presence at several locations, including Indira Gandhi International Airport, ahead of the protest. Organisers asked participants to protest peacefully and encouraged them to bring the national flag and a book, which they said symbolised the right to education and equal opportunity.

Dipke, who arrived in New Delhi from the United States shortly before the protest, was joined at the site by Indian engineer, activist, and education reformer Sonam Wangchuk. Hundreds of protesters gathered at the site, including students, parents, doctors, lawyers, and teachers, among others, with some holding placards and wearing cockroach masks. The Communist Party of India affiliated All India Youth Federation (AIYF) and All India Students' Federation (AISF) alleged that people affiliated with the Rashtriya Swayamsevak Sangh (RSS), a Hindutva paramilitary organisation, attempted to disrupt the protest by harassing and assaulting some protesters. The CJP announced that it would launch a nationwide agitation if Pradhan did not resign within seven days.

=== National campaign ===
On 11 June 2026, the CJP launched a nationwide campaign seeking reforms in the education system, beginning at Savitribai Phule Pune University in Pune. Dipke released what he called an exam manifesto containing five demands, including compensation of ₹10,000 for students affected by a paper leak, postponement of an examination, or delay in the declaration of results. He said the movement would travel to cities including Jaipur, Lucknow, Amritsar, and Bengaluru before returning to Jantar Mantar on 20 June 2026.

=== Second protest at Jantar Mantar ===
The CJP held its second protest at Jantar Mantar on 20 June 2026. Hundreds of protesters, mostly students, gathered, holding placards, singing the national anthem, and banging metal plates with spoons as a symbol of protest; many had travelled from across the nation to take part. Ahead of the protest, Dipke alleged on social media that the authorities may allow "goons" to disrupt the protest and blame the CJP, posting photos of lorries parked at Jantar Mantar which he claimed were loaded with stones.

According to the Delhi Police, the protest, which began at 1 P.M., had permission only until 5 P.M. Dipke refused to end the demonstration, stating that he would not leave Jantar Mantar until Pradhan resigned, and urged supporters to join the protest that evening. The Delhi police employed several pressure tactics to persuade the protesters to leave the barricaded site, including switching off the lights and briefly cutting off access to food and drinking water. One of the volunteers, Mohammad Junaid, who served food and water to the protestors and was thanked by Dipke himself, alleged in his petition to the Supreme Court of India that he was picked up from Delhi by police officials, kept in a vehicle for about six hours, threatened, intimidated and was subsequently dropped off at a far-off location in Dehradun. He also alleged his family being harassed by Uttar Pradesh Police.

Pradhan referred to the protesters as a "B-team of terrorists". In response, Dipke stated, "Sir, we are not terrorists. We do not need a certificate of patriotism from people like you, who are responsible for the deaths of innocent students", in reference to the students who had died by suicide amidst the 2026 NEET controversy. At the protest, Wangchuk announced that he would begin an indefinite hunger strike from 27 June if Pradhan did not resign.

=== Hunger strikes ===
==== Hunger strike of Sonam Wangchuk and AISA leaders ====
Sonam Wangchuk became a prominent figure in the protests. On 28 June, he began an indefinite hunger strike at Jantar Mantar along with six students from the All India Students Association (AISA) including their National President Neha Bora and an independent student activist named Hamad.

By 17 July, the nineteenth day of the strike, Wangchuk had lost 9.1 kilograms of body weight. A doctor attending him said he had begun losing muscle mass, and video footage showed him unable to stand or walk unaided. Politicians and entertainers, including the signatories of a statement with more than 1,800 signatures, appealed to him to end the fast. A petition filed in the Delhi High Court asked the government to admit him to a hospital to prevent his death; the government told the court that it would intervene if his health deteriorated.

On 18 July, Delhi Police removed Wangchuk from the protest site and admitted him to Safdarjung Hospital, attached to Vardhman Mahavir Medical College. Police stated that the action was taken on medical advice and in compliance with the directions of the Delhi High Court. Protest organisers criticised the police action, alleging that Wangchuk had been taken from the site forcibly and without prior notice.

Dipke warned that suppressing the protest would spark demonstrations across Delhi. On 20 July, Wangchuk announced in a handwritten statement issued from the Safdarjung Hospital, that he would continue the fast until the "youth leaders are allowed to meet the parliamentarians at the Sansad Bhawan or I am allowed to meet them here at the hospital". Three of the AISA hunger strikers who had begun fasting alongside Wangchuk on 28 June ended their strike that same day, though Wangchuk continued his own fast from hospital.

Wangchuk broke his fast after 26 days in presence of J.P. Nadda and Jitendra Singh Rana at the Medanta Hospital, where he had been shifted to on 21 July, after the government gave written assurances to take back cases against non-violent protesters and give compensation to suicide victims. Prime Minister Narendra Modi moved to address the controversy with a proposed law providing for fast-track courts and stricter punishment for those involved in paper leaks. Dipke announced that the protest will however continue until the resignation of Dharmendra Pradhan.

==== Hunger strike of Abhijeet Dipke and left-affiliated organisations ====
On 18 July, Dipke announced that he had begun an indefinite hunger strike. The announcement came after the office of the New Delhi deputy commissioner of police said Wangchuk had been shifted to hospital for essential medical care on the orders of the Delhi High Court and on expert medical advice. Dipke alleged that he had been beaten and detained by Delhi Police during what he described as a crackdown on protesters at Jantar Mantar while Wangchuk was being taken to hospital. He said that the march planned for 20 July would proceed as scheduled.

On the same day, Students Federation of India General Secretary Srijan Bhattacharyya announced that SFI President Adarsh M. Saji and SFI Joint Secretary Aishe Ghosh will join the indefinite hunger strike. Three AISA activists, Neha Bora, Ameen Amitoj and Manish Kumar and independent student Hamad continued their strike on their 21st day and so on, though according to NPR, three of the AISA fasters ended their strike on 20 July. Dipke also ended his hunger strike on Sonam Wangchuk's request, as he appealed to Dipke to participate in the Sansad Chalo March.

=== Sansad Chalo March ===
On 20 July, the first day of the monsoon session of the Parliament of India, CJP launched its 'Chalo Sansad' march. CJP asked the protesters to bring the national flag and a copy of the Constitution or photographs of B. R. Ambedkar, Mahatma Gandhi or Bhagat Singh. It also urged them to avoid political or organisational flags and to protest peacefully. The march became more important after the treatment of Wangchuk, who went on a 20-day hunger strike to support the CJP at Jantar Mantar. On Saturday, he was taken to the hospital by force. This upset CJP supporters and brought more attention to the protest movement.

Delhi Police tightened security across New Delhi district ahead of the march and imposed prohibitory orders under Section 163 of the Bharatiya Nagarik Suraksha Sanhita (BNSS). A day before the march, Deputy Commissioner of Police (DCP) Sachin Sharma issued a public advisory on X stating that Delhi Police had not granted permission for the march. Delhi Metro Rail Corporation (DMRC) closed five metro stations – Udyog Bhawan, Central Secretariat, Patel Chowk, Janpath and one of India's biggest interchange stations, Rajiv Chowk ahead of CJP's march to Parliament. Protests broke out inside metro stations as the government sealed the exit points at stations which were near the protest site. Internet services were also shut down in the vicinity of the Parliament.

Security forces used baton charges and tear gas against the protesters who were marching towards the Parliament by breaking police barricades. Near Constitution Club, tear gas affected commuters at Central Secretariat metro station and a The Wire reporter covering the protest.

Students and eyewitnesses alleged that authorities used excessive force, including beating demonstrators, dragging students along the streets, and detaining students and children in police buses. Security forces took firing positions with machine guns aimed at the Parliament gates. The South First reported that visuals showed protesters sustaining injuries to their head and upper body. Gurdwara Bangla Sahib became a refuge for several such students and protesters fleeing batons and teargas.

The police action drew widespread criticism from public figures and several opposition leaders, including Shashi Tharoor, Rahul Gandhi, and Arvind Kejriwal. Tharoor questioned the use of force, asking, "When a non-violent protest is taking place, what is the reason for a lathi charge?".

Delhi Police rejected the allegations, claiming that it had engaged in maintaining public order in a professional manner and denied reports of any violence or detentions during the protest.

=== Post-march strategic shift ===
After the 20 July crackdown, CJP leaders said the movement would not organise further marches through central Delhi, citing the risk of renewed police violence against participants, while affirming that the sit-in at Jantar Mantar and the demand for Pradhan's resignation would continue. Dipke linked the decision to reports that around 150 protesters had been hurt in the 20 July march, while CJP spokesperson Ashutosh Ranka said the movement's core demand for Pradhan's dismissal remained unchanged. NPR reported that although marches had been suspended, protesters continued to camp at Jantar Mantar and said they would remain until their demands were met. A profile of the movement published by Time on 22 July quotes Dipke describing Modi as behaving like "a dictator" in the aftermath of the crackdown, a characterisation the Bharatiya Janata Party has not directly responded to. By 23 July, the dispute over Pradhan's resignation had also stalled proceedings in Parliament, where the opposition and the government remained deadlocked over the terms of a debate on the paper leak.

=== Parliamentary deadlock over a NEET debate ===
The protests coincided with repeated disruptions to the Monsoon session of Parliament. Opposition members pressed for Pradhan's resignation as a precondition for any discussion of the alleged NEET-UG paper leak, while the government maintained that it was willing to hold a debate without preconditions. On 23 July, the fourth consecutive day of disruptions since the session began, both the Lok Sabha and the Rajya Sabha were adjourned multiple times after opposition members raised slogans demanding Pradhan's dismissal. Parliamentary Affairs Minister Kiren Rijiju said the government had approached the Congress and other opposition parties to hold the debate and that members could speak for as long as they wished, but accused the opposition of "trying to run away" from the discussion by attaching preconditions. Leader of the Opposition in the Rajya Sabha Mallikarjun Kharge responded that the Education Minister should resign before any debate could take place.

Rijiju also referred to remarks made earlier the same day by Prime Minister Modi, who announced fast-track courts to deliver punishment for those found responsible in paper-leak cases.

=== Delhi Police response ===
The handling of the protests by Delhi Police became a subject of public and legal scrutiny. Police stated that permission for the demonstration on 20 June 2026 had been granted only until 5 p.m., but organisers continued the sit-in beyond the permitted time, saying they would remain until their demands were addressed.

On 20 July, Delhi Police used lathis to disperse hundreds of protesters marching from Mandi House Metro Station to Jantar Mantar, intending to reach the Cockroach Janta Party (CJP) protest site, as reported by an eyewitness to PTI. Allegations emerged regarding the deployment of pellet gun by security personnel, Delhi Police denied these claims, describing them as "completely false and misleading". A medical report from the Safdargunj Hospital however confirmed that one of the protesters had suffered wounds from a pellet gun. A general diary entry at the Parliament Street police station recorded the use of two rounds of pellets on 20 July by the Rapid Action Force (RAF) according to media reports.

One of the protesters alleged that she was shot at with live bullets near Jantar Mantar. A medical report by Dr. Ram Manohar Lohia Hospital stated that she suffered trauma to her right ear due to a gunshot. The Delhi Police however stated that she suffered injury from a blunt weapon and not a firearm according to her medical legal report.

=== Litigation and investigations ===
In July 2026, a public interest litigation was filed before the Delhi High Court alleging that Delhi Police had subjected protesters to continuous photography, videography, and surveillance, creating what the petition called an "atmosphere of intimidation" and infringing their rights to privacy and peaceful assembly. The matter was admitted for hearing. Furthermore, police personnel from the Delhi Police were observed operating in civilian clothing during the crackdowns.

On 22 July, the Delhi High Court sought a response from the central government and the Delhi Police to PILs alleging excessive use of force against the protesters. Additional Solicitor General S.V. Raju submitted that the section of the protests had turned violent with some of the protesters engaging in stone-pelting. Lawyers arguing on behalf of the petitioners termed the police action as unwarranted and brutal.

CCTV footage from the protest sites showed protesters turning violent during the demonstration, where a section of the crowd attacked security personnel, breaking through barricades, pelting stones, using pepper spray, overturning vehicles, damaging police vehicles and assaulting officers sitting inside them. The video showed protesters damaging public property and violating prohibitory orders imposed in the area. Delhi Police alleged that 2,873 men with criminal antecedents were present at the protest sites between 20–25 July, including criminals involved in heinous crimes such as sexual assault, murder and crimes involving minors (POSCO).

The West Bengal STF is investigating an alleged Pakistan linked Jaish-e-Mohammed plot to disrupt protest at Jantar Mantar. The probe concerns allegations of plans to procure police uniforms, incite unrest during the demonstration, and maintain contact with Pakistan based handlers. Punjab Police also reported and busted a ISI-linked terror plot, aimed at carrying out terror attack in student protest at Jantar-Mantar, New Delhi. The police apprehended 9 accused including 4 juveniles, and one confessed to being in contact with an ISI-handler based in Pakistan. Punjab Police also recovered illegal pistols, molotov cocktails, and live cartridges, said the Director General of Police (Punjab).

On 17 October, the Supreme Court constituted a body, High Powered Enquiry Committee, and launched an online portal and working address to collect all reports on incidents of violence in Jantar Mantar protests for investigation.

== Aftermath ==
Two days after the protests had been paused, the CJP and the All India Students Association asserted that the government had not fulfilled its agreement to refrain from punishing protesters, and floated the possibility of restarting protests. The CJP reckoned that more than 100 students had been arrested.

== Reactions ==
Opposition leaders supported the protesters and Wangchuk's hunger strike. Samajwadi Party president Akhilesh Yadav urged Wangchuk to end his fast, calling his life "invaluable" while supporting the demand for greater accountability in the education system.

Rahul Gandhi characterised Modi as India's most "anti-youth Prime Minister", also saying "Tear-gassing students and lathi-charging them is not democratic. They have legitimate demands. The Prime Minister should accept them and act." The Congress party condemned police action against protesters marching to Parliament on the opening day of the monsoon session. It also said it had raised concerns about paper leaks before the current agitation led by the Cockroach Janta Party (CJP).

On 28 June, NCP (SP) national spokesperson Anish Gawande joined the protest at Jantar Mantar and reiterated the demand for Pradhan's resignation. He said the Trinamool Congress, the Dravida Munnetra Kazhagam, and the NCP (SP) had supported the agitation.

On 16 July, former Delhi Chief Minister Arvind Kejriwal joined the protest at Jantar Mantar, seek for Pradhan's removal, and suggested Wangchuk as education minister.

On 16 July, AIMIM president and Hyderabad MP Asaduddin Owaisi urged the Union government to seriously consider Wangchuk's demands and expressed concern over his deteriorating health. Following the police action during the 20 July march, Owaisi criticised the government for failing to engage with the students earlier and described the situation as "complete mismanagement", comparing the response with the handling of the anti-CAA and farmers' protests.

During his hunger strike, Wangchuk said the movement had "no political colour" and described its demands as an appeal for accountability and reform in the education system, not just the resignation of the education minister.

=== Solidarity demonstrations ===
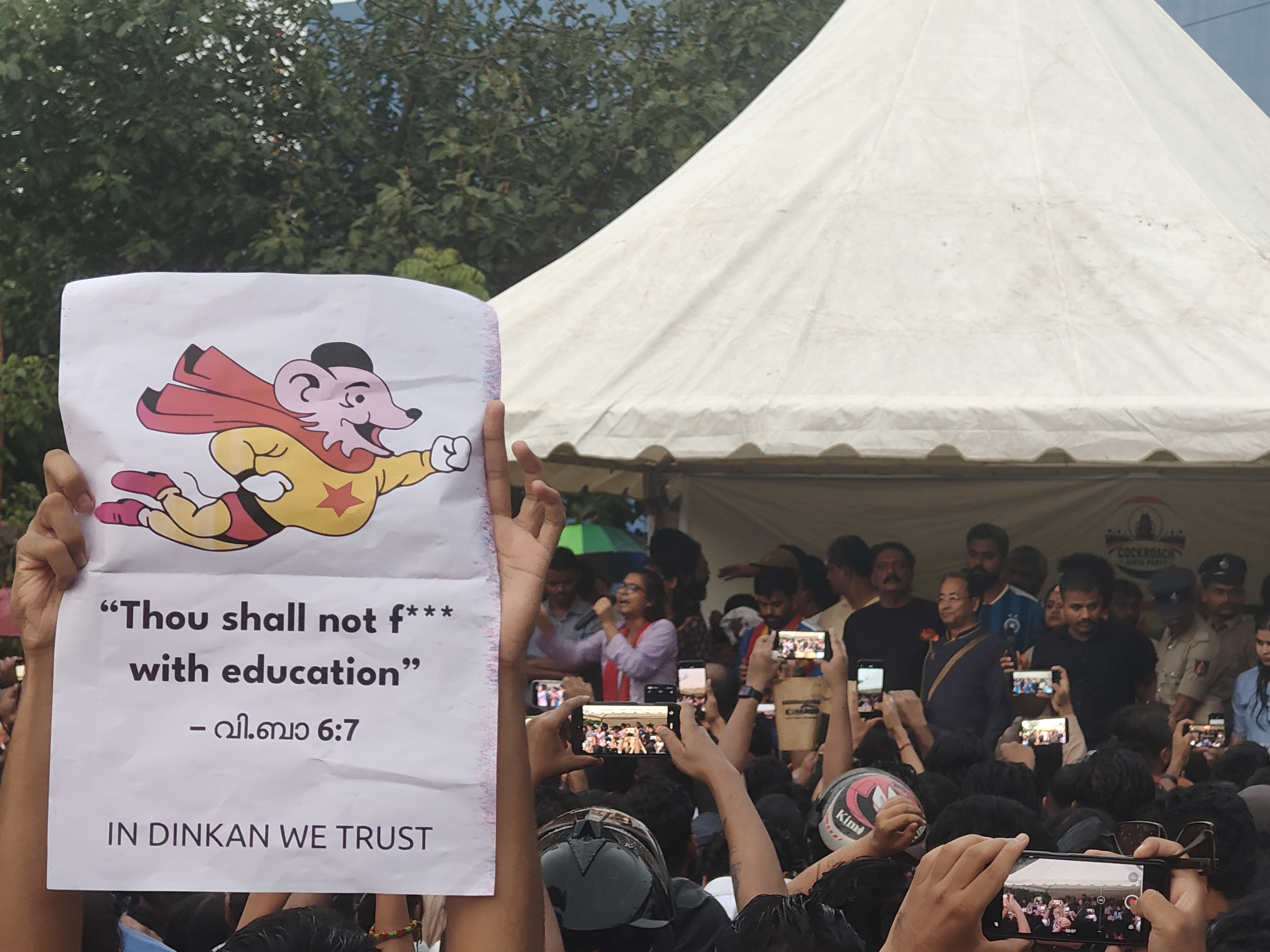
Protests were held in solidarity in Bengaluru and other cities.

Students and opposition groups held demonstrations in support of the protests and their goals across India, particularly on the day of the Sansad Chalo march, including in Mumbai, Bengaluru, Kolkata, Patna, Dehradun, Goa, Surat, Guwahati, Thiruvananthapuram, Jammu, Kargil, Vadodara, Ahmedabad and Varanasi.

Internationally, the Students Federation of India – United Kingdom held solidarity protests at the Indian high commission in London, and in Manchester, Edinburgh and Glasgow. Hindus for Human Rights held protests in New York City, Los Angeles, San Jose, London and Dublin.

Protests in Mumbai have been particularly sustained, running continuously since at least 18 July. Some protestors have accused the Mumbai police of arbitrarily detaining civilians and committing human rights violations. The Mumbai police registered FIRs against 400 people for their participation in the protests, citing a lack of police permission.

In Kerala, solidarity demonstrations were held in several cities, including Thrissur, Kochi, Kozhikode and Thiruvananthapuram, where students, activists, and civil society groups expressed support for the Jantar Mantar protests.Student organisations in Kerala, including SFI and Kerala Students' Union, organised solidarity protests, with KSU also observing a statewide educational bandh.

On 26 July 2026, the Students Federation of India – United Kingdom organised a demonstration at the Trafalgar Square in London, to celebrate the victory i.e. resignation of Dharmendra Pradhan, in solidarity with the protestors of India. It was attended by the activist, Greta Thunberg. Addressing the crowd, she gave a short speech:

"The Indian student protest shows what we can achieve when people come together and resist. The protests show the true meaning of people power. The Indian student struggle for justice and broader struggle for democracy and liberation is also our struggle," she said. She closed with the words "Power to the people."

=== Film fraternity of India ===
The protest was supported by actors such as Prakash Raj, Naseeruddin Shah, Ratna Pathak Shah, Sonakshi Sinha and Seema Pahwa. However, overall solidarity from Bollywood was signally absent, especially from actors who had previously supported political causes in other countries. Amrit Dhillon wrote in The Guardian that Bollywood was widely understood to have been captured by the Modi government in recent years.

Actors from the Malayalam film industry — including Tovino Thomas, Parvathi, Mammootty and Ranjini Haridas — extended support to the student protests.

=== Hip-hop community of India ===
Indian and Desi hip-hop as an art form also played a crucial role in the protests. Songs like "Azadi", by Indian rapper Divine and producer Dub Sharma, and "Boom Shaka" by rappers KR$NA and Dhanda Nyoliwala, were used extensively to promote the cause, while members of the hip-hop collective Zuban-e-Lucknow, came together to perform a rap cypher, whose message was centred on accountability and education reforms.

Indian rappers like Hanumankind, Chaar Diwaari, Encore ABJ of Seedhe Maut, Raga, Karma and KR$NA joined the Delhi protests. Meanwhile, Emiway Bantai and Raftaar, among others attended Mumbai solidarity protests. Vedan was among the 100 protesters booked for protesting in Kochi in solidarity with the CJP. Arivu was also detained while leading a surprise protest outside the Tamil Nadu Secretariat.

== See also ==
- Citizenship Amendment Act protests
- 2026 Anti-CEC protests
- List of Indian student organisations
- 2026 NEET controversy
- Sansad Chalo march
- Gen Z protests
- 2026 Jharkhand student protests
