= Vineet Joshi =

Indian civil servant and former Higher Education Secretary

Secretary, Ministry of Panchayati Raj
- Incumbent
- Assumed office 31 July 2026
- Minister: Lalan Singh
- Preceded by: Vivek Bhardwaj

Secretary, Department of Higher Education
- In office 25 December 2024 – 31 July 2026
- Minister: Dharmendra Pradhan
- Preceded by: K Sanjay Murthy
- Succeeded by: Naresh Pal Gangwar

Chief Secretary of Manipur
- In office 1 July 2023 – 25 December 2024
- Preceded by: Rajesh Kumar
- Succeeded by: Prashant Kumar Singh

Director General, National Testing Agency
- In office 13 December 2019 – 10 November 2020

Chairman, Central Board of Secondary Education
- In office 12 February 2010 – 27 November 2014

Personal details
- Born: 2 November 1968 (age 58) Uttar Pradesh, India
- Education: Indian Institute of Foreign Trade (MBA); IIT Kanpur (B.Tech)
- Occupation: Civil servant
- Known for: Introducing Continuous and Comprehensive Evaluation

Vineet Joshi (born 2 November 1968) is an Indian bureaucrat who works at the Ministry of Panchayati Raj. He also served as Secretary in the Department of Higher Education (India) under the Ministry of Education from 26 December 2024 till 23 July 2026. He was also given additional charge as the chairman of the University Grants Commission, on 11 April 2025. Previously, he served as Chief Secretary of Manipur, Director-General of National Testing Agency (NTA), which is responsible for conducting entrance examinations in India. He also served as the resident commissioner of Government of Manipur. IAS Vineet Joshi was re-appointed as the Chairman of Central Board of Secondary Education (CBSE) on 14 February 2022, after which he was succeeded by IAS Nidhi Chhibber.

== Early life and education ==
He was educated at Annie Besant School, Allahabad, and GIC, Allahabad. Joshi pursued an undergraduate degree in mechanical engineering at IIT Kanpur and a Master of Business Administration from the Indian Institute of Foreign Trade. His elder brother is Vivek Joshi, an IAS officer of the 1989 batch.

== Transfer amid NEET protests ==
He belongs to the 1992 batch IAS (Manipur cadre) and started service in the Youth Affairs and Sports department in Manipur. He joined the Ministry of Youth Affairs and Sports as private secretary in the 1999. Late in 2010 and then again in 2022, he was appointed as the chairperson of Central Board of Secondary Education. He was appointed as the Chief Secretary of Manipur on 7 May 2023 by the Government of Manipur and served there till 25 December 2024. Thereafter, he was appointed as Secretary in the Department of Higher Education (India) under Ministry of Education from 26 December 2024 onwards. On 11 April 2025, he was given additional charge of the chairman of University Grants Commission.

On 23 July 2026, Joshi was transferred from the Department of Higher Education to the Ministry of Panchayati Raj as part of a wider secretary-level bureaucratic reshuffle. He was succeeded as Higher Education Secretary by Naresh Pal Gangwar.

The transfer occurred during 2026 NEET youth protests over the leak and subsequent cancellation of the 2026 NEET-UG examination. The cancellation affected approximately two million candidates and was followed by reports that about a dozen students had died by suicide, intensifying public anger and demands for accountability. Protesters demanded reforms to the examination system, compensation for the affected families and the resignation of Education Minister Dharmendra Pradhan.

Although news reports connected the timing of Joshi's transfer with growing scrutiny over the examination controversy, the Government of India did not publicly describe the transfer as a dismissal or officially state that it was imposed as punishment.
