= Public Examinations (Prevention of Unfair Means) Act, 2024 =

Anti-cheating legislature in India

Parliament of India
- Long title: An Act to prevent unfair means in the public examinations and to provide for matters connected therewith or incidental thereto.
- Citation: Act No. 1 of 2024
- Territorial extent: India
- Passed by: Lok Sabha
- Passed: 6 February 2024
- Passed by: Rajya Sabha
- Passed: 9 February 2024
- Assented to by: President Droupadi Murmu
- Assented to: 25 February 2024
- Commenced: 21 June 2024

Legislative history

Initiating chamber: Lok Sabha
- Bill title: Public Examinations (Prevention of Unfair Means) Bill, 2024
- Bill citation: Bill No. 15 of 2024
- Introduced by: Jitendra Singh, MoS for Personnel, Public Grievances and Pensions
- Introduced: 5 February 2024
- Passed: 6 February 2024
- Voting summary: Majority Voice voted for; Minority Voice voted against

Revising chamber: Rajya Sabha
- Passed: 9 February 2024
- Voting summary: Majority Voice voted for; Minority Voice voted against

Final stages
- Finally passed both chambers: 9 February 2024

Amends
- Criminal Law (Amendment) Ordinance, 1944 (Ordinance 38 of 1944)

Amended by
- Public Examinations (Prevention of Unfair Means) Amendment Act, 2026
- Status: In force (amended)

The Public Examinations (Prevention of Unfair Means) Act, 2024 is an Act of Parliament of India. The law aims to curb cheating and uphold the integrity of public examinations.

It was amended in August 2026 by the Public Examinations (Prevention of Unfair Means) Amendment Act, 2026, , widely known as the Anti-Paper Leak Act, 2026. This is a proposed Indian legislative bill aimed at curbing organised cheating, paper leaks, and systemic fraud in public and competitive examinations. Introduced in the Lok Sabha on 27 July 2026, by Union Minister of State Jitendra Singh, the legislation seeks to amend the existing Public Examinations (Prevention of Unfair Means) Act, 2024 by instituting significantly harsher prison sentences, massive financial fines, and expedited judicial processes.

The introduction of the bill followed intense nationwide protests led by students and activists—including a prominent hunger strike by education reformist Sonam Wangchuk—over the NEET paper leak controversy, which culminated in the resignation of Union Education Minister Dharmendra Pradhan.

== Background ==
The government felt the need to introduce the Public Examinations (Prevention of Unfair Means) Bill, 2024, due to several concerns regarding cheating and malpractices in public examinations. These included the Union Public Service Commission (UPSC), Staff Selection Commission (SSC), and the National Testing Agency (NTA). However, the summer of 2026 saw massive protests across India following widespread allegations of paper leaks and irregularities in the NEET-UG exams.

Instances of cheating in various public examinations, including entrance exams like State PSCs, and even school board exams, have been repeatedly reported. These cases involved practices like paper leaks, organized cheating gangs, impersonation, and electronic device usage.

== Provisions ==
The Act outlines several key provisions to curb cheating and promote fair conduct in public examinations. Here's a breakdown of some major points:

Defining Unfair Means:

- The Act broadly defines "unfair means" to include various malpractices, such as:
  - Leaking question papers or answer keys
  - Assisting candidates during exams (unauthorized communication, providing solutions)
  - Tampering with computer networks or resources
  - Impersonating candidates
  - Conducting fake examinations or issuing fake documents
  - Tampering with documents for merit lists or ranks

Penalties and Punishments:

- Individuals:
  - Imprisonment ranging from 3 to 10 years depending on the offense severity
  - Fines up to Rs. 1 crore for organized crimes
- Service providers:
  - Fines up to Rs. 1 crore for involvement in malpractices
  - Barring from conducting public examinations for 4 years
  - Personal liability for directors/management involved
- Organized crimes:
  - Harsher penalties, with imprisonment between 5 and 10 years and a minimum fine of Rs. 1 crore
  - Institution involved can face property attachment and forfeiture

Empowering Authorities:

- Conduct surprise checks at exam centers and seize electronic devices if suspected foul play
- Blacklist service providers found guilty of malpractices
- Share information and coordinate across agencies to effectively tackle organized cheating

Additional Measures:

- Establishing specialized courts for speedy trial of offenses
- Promoting public awareness about the bill and its implications

== Calls for amendments ==
The protests were spearheaded by medical aspirants and student organisations, notably the Cockroach Janata Party (CJP), demanding accountability and systemic reforms. Activist Sonam Wangchuk held a high-profile hunger strike, which he ended only after receiving assurances from the Central Government that strict legislative measures would be immediately adopted. During this political crisis, Education Minister Dharmendra Pradhan submitted his resignation. In response to the unrest, Prime Minister Narendra Modi promised stringent action against paper leak syndicates, leading to the Union Cabinet clearing the new amendment bill on 24 July 2026.

== Amendment Act ==
Public Examinations (Prevention of Unfair Means) Amendment Act, 2026

Parliament of India
- Long title: An Act to prevent unfair means in the public examinations and to provide for matters connected therewith or incidental thereto.
- Citation: Act No. 10 of 2026
- Territorial extent: India
- Passed by: Lok Sabha
- Passed: 29 July 2026
- Passed by: Rajya Sabha
- Passed: 30 July 2026
- Assented to by: President Droupadi Murmu
- Assented to: 31 July 2026
- Commenced: 31 July 2026

Legislative history

Initiating chamber: Lok Sabha
- Bill title: Public Examinations (Prevention of Unfair Means) Amendment Bill, 2026
- Bill citation: Bill No. 139 of 2026
- Introduced by: Jitendra Singh, MoS for Personnel, Public Grievances and Pensions
- Introduced: 27 July 2026
- Passed: 29 July 2026
- Voting summary: Majority Voice voted for; Minority Voice voted against

Revising chamber: Rajya Sabha
- Passed: 30 July 2026
- Voting summary: Majority Voice voted for; Minority Voice voted against

Final stages
- Finally passed both chambers: 30 July 2026

Amends
- Public Examinations (Prevention of Unfair Means) Act, 2024
- Status: In force

On 31 July 2026, through the Public Examinations (Prevention of Unfair Means) Amendment Act, 2026, provisions related to jail term and penalties along with introducing fast-track courts on paper leak investigations were introduced following the 2026 NEET scandal and the resultant 2026 Jantar Mantar protests.

=== Key Amendment Act provisions ===
The proposed 2026 amendments focus heavily on deterring organised crime syndicates and ensuring the rapid delivery of justice through time-bound proceedings.

==== Enhanced penalties for individuals ====
Under the 2024 Act, individuals convicted of examination fraud faced imprisonment of three to five years and a fine of ₹10 lakh. The 2026 Bill proposes:

- Minimum imprisonment increased from 3 to 5 years, with a maximum of up to 10 years.
- Maximum fines increased five-fold, from ₹10 lakh to ₹50 lakh.

==== Strictures on service providers ====
The bill heavily targets private agencies, tech firms, and institutions contracted to conduct exams, print papers, or manage logistics:

- Financial penalties for complicit service providers are raised from a maximum of ₹1 crore to ₹5 crore.
- The debarment period preventing a convicted agency from participating in future public examinations is doubled from 4 to 8 years.
- If the management or directors of a company are found complicit, they face a minimum of 5 years in prison and a fine of up to ₹5 crore.

==== Organised syndicates ====
For established crime rings and organised networks executing paper leaks, the bill mandates a minimum of 7 years in prison and raises the minimum fine from ₹1 crore to ₹10 crore. This provision is intended to financially cripple large-scale paper leak operations by making the financial risk unfeasible.

==== Fast-Track investigations and trials ====
To avoid prolonged litigation, the amendment introduces strict statutory timelines:

- Investigations by police, central agencies, or a newly empowered Central Special Task Force must be completed within two months.
- State governments and Union Territories, in consultation with their respective High Courts, must designate Special Fast Track Courts dedicated exclusively to hearing cases under the Act.
- These special courts are mandated to conduct day-to-day proceedings and conclude trials within three months of the chargesheet being filed.

=== Legislative history ===
The Union Cabinet formally approved the bill on 24 July 2026, following the Prime Minister's public commitment to bring tougher measures without delay. Parliamentary Affairs Minister Kiren Rijiju emphasized the urgency of the legislation in addressing student grievances.

On 27 July 2026, during the Monsoon Session of Parliament, Minister of State Dr. Jitendra Singh officially tabled the Public Examinations (Prevention of Unfair Means) Amendment Bill, 2026 in the Lok Sabha. The introduction occurred amid heavy protests by Opposition MPs over the NEET paper leak row and alleged police brutality during the 20 July Jantar Mantar protests, leading to severe disruptions and adjournments in both houses.

== See also ==
- National Eligibility cum Entrance Test (Undergraduate)
- Education in India
