= Naresh Pal Gangwar =

Indian Bureaucrats

Secretary, Department of Higher Education
- In office 27 July 2026 – 10 August 2026
- Minister: Pralhad Joshi
- Preceded by: Vineet Joshi
- Succeeded by: Deepti Gaur Mukerjee

Secretary, Ministry of Fisheries, Animal Husbandry and Dairying
- In office 1 September 2025 – 23 July 2026
- Minister: Lalan Singh
- Preceded by: Alka Upadhyay
- Succeeded by: Sushil Kumar Lohani

Additional Secretary, Ministry of Environment, Forest and Climate Change , New Delhi
- In office 18 January 2020 – September 2025
- Preceded by: Ms. B. V. Umadevi
- Succeeded by: Shri Vir Vikram Yadav

Personal details
- Born: 21 October 1970 (age 55) Nainital, Uttarakhand, India
- Spouse: Dr. Ranjita Singh
- Education: IIT Roorkee; IIT Delhi; Nalsar University, Hyderabad
- Occupation: Civil servant

Naresh Pal Gangwar (born 21 October 1970) is a 1994-batch Indian Administrative Service (IAS) and Bureaucrat from the Rajasthan cadre. From 26 July 2026 till 10 August 2026 he had served as the Secretary in the Department of Higher Education (India). He formerly served as the Secretary, Ministry of Fisheries, Animal Husbandry and Dairying from 1 September 2025 until 26 July 2026.Gangwar was born 21 October 1970 in Nainital, Uttarakhand in Gangwar family.

== Education ==
Gangwar's primary education was completed in her hometown after he complete .TECH.(Communication & Radar), B.TECH.(Elect.& Communication), M.A.(Economics) from IIT Roorkee and IIT Delhi and Nalsar University, Hyderabad.

== Personal life ==
Gangwar Married to Dr.Ranjita Singh and he has 1 child.

== Career ==
Gangwar has served many high level post in central government and state government of Rajasthan and He formally served as the Additional Secretary, Ministry of Environment, Forest and Climate Change New Delhi from 18 January 2022 22 August 2025.

From 1 September 2025 to 23 July 2026,he served as the Secretary, Ministry of Fisheries, Animal Husbandry and Dairying.

Gangwar served as the Secretary, Department of Higher Education from 27 July 2026 till 10 August 2026.

== Subsidy controversy ==
In June 2026, The Indian Express reported that Gangwar's wife, mother and son had collectively received more than ₹1.16 crore in subsidies over five years for commercial cucumber cultivation projects in Jaipur district, Rajasthan. The subsidies were provided under the National Horticulture Board's "Development of Commercial Horticulture through Production and Post-Harvest Management of Horticulture Crops" scheme, administered under the Ministry of Agriculture and Farmers' Welfare.

According to the investigation, Gangwar's mother received ₹46.03 lakh in January 2025, his son received ₹46.49 lakh in March 2023, and a project in the name of his wife and others received ₹24.36 lakh in 2021–22. The newspaper also reported that Gangwar had disclosed details of only one project approved under the scheme in his annual immovable-property declaration for 2021–22, raising questions over the disclosure of the family-linked projects.

Gangwar disputed suggestions of wrongdoing. He stated that his mother and son were not financially dependent on him and therefore, under his interpretation of the All India Services (Conduct) Rules, information relating to their property was not required to be included in his annual property return. The issue received renewed attention following his appointment as Higher Education Secretary in July 2026 where he served till 10 August 2026. As of July 2026, no official inquiry had concluded that Gangwar had violated any law or service rule.
