= 2024 NEET controversy =

Controversy in conduct of NEET(UG) 2024

The 2024 NEET-UG controversy was caused by multiple discrepancies, irregularities and alleged malpractices during the National Eligibility cum Entrance Test (Undergraduate). As one of India's largest exams in terms of applicant numbers, NEET-UG is the sole nationwide test for admission to undergraduate medical programs and is conducted by the National Testing Agency (NTA).

On 5 May 2024, NEET-UG faced allegations of question paper leaks. While social media posts claimed the exam questions were leaked, the NTA denied these allegations. In Patna, Bihar, police arrested 13 people, including four examinees, who had allegedly paid ₹30 lakh (US$31,000) to ₹50 lakh (US$52,000) to obtain the question paper beforehand. In Godhra, Gujarat, a raid at an exam center revealed that a teacher, who was also the deputy superintendent, instructed students not to answer questions they didn’t know, promising to fill in the answers. Five people were arrested, and it was discovered that candidates from multiple states had taken the exam at this center. The cases were handed over to the Central Bureau of Investigation (CBI).

The examination results, suddenly announced on 4 June 2024, also sparked controversy due to an unusually high number of top rankers. Many students received scores that appeared mathematically impossible, triggering widespread complaints and legal challenges. This led to nationwide protests, with demands to cancel the exam and conduct a re-test.

On 23 July 2024, the Supreme Court of India acknowledged that at least 155 students had directly benefited from the paper leak. However, it ruled that there was no evidence of a systemic failure beyond isolated incidents. The Court also rejected claims of a large-scale NEET-UG 2024 paper leak and declined to order a re-examination, citing a lack of credible proof of widespread irregularities.

An unprecedented 67 candidates secured a perfect score of 720 out of 720 in the National Eligibility cum Entrance Test (Undergraduate) (NEET-UG) 2024, compared to only two to four perfect scorers in previous years. Among these top rankers, six candidates were reported to have taken the examination from the same test center in Haryana.

== Background ==
Introduced in 2013, succeeding the All India Pre Medical Test, NEET-UG is the mandatory and sole examination for admission to medical courses in India. On 5 May 2024, approximately 2.4 million candidates across India took the examination. There has been a general trend of increasing applicant numbers over the years. In the previous year, out of 2.04 million students who registered for the exam, nearly 1.14 million qualified for admission to undergraduate medical institutions.

== Paper leak and use of unfair means ==
On 5 May 2024, the day of the NEET-UG examination, several social media posts alleged that the exam questions had been leaked in advance. The NTA denied these allegations but issued a public notice stating that an incorrect distribution of papers had occurred at the Girls Higher Secondary Model Vidya Mandir examination center in Sawai Madhopur, Rajasthan. Some students had left the examination center despite the invigilators’ efforts to stop them. The notice emphasized that this was an "isolated incident" and that the integrity of the examination process at other centers had not been compromised. The NTA reconducted the examination for the 120 candidates who had taken the exam at the center where the incorrect distribution of question papers had occurred on the same day.

=== Patna and Hazaribagh ===
The exam paper was allegedly leaked 1 day before the examination held in Patna, Bihar. On 5 May 2024, a few hours before the examination, Patna police were informed by a whistle-blower about a scandal involving the examination. The police registered a First Information Report (FIR) under Sections 407, 408, 409 (criminal breach of trust), and 120B (criminal conspiracy) of the Indian Penal Code and arrested 13 people, including four examinees. On 11 May 2024, the Economic Offences Unit (EOU) of Bihar Police took over the case after discovering the involvement of several organized gangs. The EOU found that some medical aspirants had paid large sums of money, ranging from ₹30 to ₹50 lakh, to brokers involved in the racket for obtaining the question paper before the examination. The arrested candidates told the police where they had obtained the question papers and confirmed that the questions in the actual NEET UG question paper were similar to the ones they had received from the broker the day before the examination.

The case was subsequently transferred to the Central Bureau of Investigation (CBI). In its submissions to the Supreme Court of India on 23 July 2024, the CBI reported that the leak had occurred on the morning of the examination, 5 May 2024, in contrast to the earlier investigation by the Patna Police, which had stated that the leak occurred on 4 May 2024. During the investigation, CBI had found burnt scraps of the photocopy of the NEET-UG 2024 question paper in Patna with a serial number corresponding to Oasis Public School in Hazaribagh. They traced this back to a girl examinee who had received the paper with a torn seal. The girl informed the CBI that she had noticed the torn seal but did not report it to the invigilator. According to the CBI, the center superintendent of Oasis Public School in Hazaribagh, Jharkhand had left the back door of the strong room, where exam papers were stored, open. At 8:02 am, the accused, Pankaj Kumar, also known as Aditya, entered the room with his toolkit, opened the locker, removed the seal from a question paper, took photographs of it, and then resealed it using a lighter. By 9:23 am, the photos had been forwarded to a co-conspirator at a guest house in Hazaribagh. This co-conspirator had printed out the photos, and 7-8 solvers completed the Botany and Zoology papers by 10:15 am and the Physics and Chemistry papers by 10:40 am. The solved papers were then shared with another location in Hazaribagh and two centers in Patna, where some examinees were made to memorize the answers. The city coordinator for Hazaribagh was the Principal of Oasis Public School, Ehsanul Haque, while the center superintendent was the school's Vice Principal, Imtiaz Alam.

The CBI arrested the solvers and conspirators. The CBI identified 155 students who have directly benefited from this paper leak; however, only two of these candidates scored more than 570 marks. The CBI stated that the accused had destroyed the mobile phone used to take pictures of the exam paper; however, about 18 other phones were recovered and sent for forensic analysis. The solvers were not allowed to carry their mobile phones during this exercise because the conspirators did not want to benefit those who had not paid. The solvers were MBBS students from AIIMS Patna, RIMS Ranchi, and a medical college in Bharatpur. Pankaj Kumar is a 2017 batch civil engineer from NIT Jamshedpur.

=== Godhra ===
On 5 May 2024, the district education department of Panchmahal district raided a NEET UG exam center at Jai Jalaram School in Godhra, Gujarat. During the raid, they seized a list of students from a schoolteacher who had allegedly promised to help these students. An FIR was filed by the Godhra Police on charges of criminal breach of trust, cheating, and criminal conspiracy. The police arrested five people in connection with the alleged cheating. According to the police, the teacher, who was also the deputy superintendent of the exam center, had instructed the candidates not to answer questions they didn’t know, assuring them that he would answer them after collecting their answer sheets. The police also recovered ₹7 lakh from the teacher's car, who had reportedly charged ₹10 lakh from each student for filling their answer sheets. A few days later, it was revealed that 16 of at least 26 students whose names were on the list seized from the school teacher hailed from Odisha, Jharkhand, Maharashtra, and Karnataka. Despite repeated requests by the investigating officer, the NTA did not provide the OMR sheets of the candidates involved in this case.

== Discrepancies in result ==
The NEET-UG 2024 results were unexpectedly declared on 4 June 2024, ten days earlier than the originally scheduled date, coinciding with the announcement of the 2024 Indian general election results. A total of 67 students achieved perfect scores, a significantly higher number than in previous examinations, which raised controversy. The NTA clarified that the increase in top scorers was due to 44 of the 67 students incorrectly answering a physics question but still being awarded marks because of an error in an older version of the NCERT textbook. The NTA awarded these marks after about 13,000 students challenged the answer key released prior to the results. On 22 July, the Supreme Court ordered IIT Delhi to submit a report on the controversial question. On 23 July, the Court followed the report's recommendations and ruled that the NTA could not award marks due to an error in the textbook. It upheld only one correct answer for the question, resulting in the number of toppers being reduced to 17. The re-revised result was declared on 26 July 2024.

Several examinees received scores of 718 or 719, which students argued was mathematically impossible under the exam marking scheme. The NTA later clarified that 1,563 examinees, including six top scorers from the same center, were awarded compensatory marks for lost time. The NTA awarded these marks based on a normalization formula established by the Supreme Court of India in a 2018 judgment. Examinees at some centers in Haryana, Delhi, and Chhattisgarh complained that they were given less than the allotted time to complete their examination and filed writ petitions before the High Courts of Punjab & Haryana, Delhi, and Chhattisgarh. However, after the intervention of the Supreme Court, the NTA decided to withdraw the grace marks and held the examination again for those 1,563 candidates on 23 June 2024. Out of these, 813 students took the retest.

== Petitions filed in the Supreme Court ==
Several petitions were filed in the High Courts of various states and the Supreme Court of India regarding multiple issues related to the conduct of the examination. On 17 May 2024, the Supreme Court denied the petition to stay the publication of exam results. On 11 June 2024, while hearing the petition to cancel the exam, the Supreme Court stated that the "sanctity [of the exam] has been affected" and "we need answers." However, the court refused to stay the counseling process, which was scheduled to commence on 6 July. On 13 June 2024, the Supreme Court of India allowed the cancellation of the scorecards of the 1,563 candidates who were given grace marks and ordered a re-test for those candidates.

On 8 July, a Supreme Court bench consisting of Chief Justice of India, DY Chandrachud and justices JB Pardiwala and Manoj Misra observed that the exam had been compromised by a paper leak. The court stated that the decision to conduct a re-examination could not be made without determining whether it was a widespread leak or an isolated incident. It also ordered the Central Bureau of Investigation (CBI) to submit a report on the investigation status before the next hearing, which was scheduled for 11 July. The Supreme Court later postponed the hearing to 18 July. On 18 July, the Supreme Court ordered the NTA to publish the results of the entire exam, including center and city-wise results, by 12 noon on 20 July, while keeping the identity of the students hidden. The court announced it will resume the hearing on 22 July. On 23 July, the Supreme Court established that, while there was no denying that a paper leak occurred where 155 students directly benefited from it, said that there was no indication that it was widespread enough to affect the exam as a whole. Therefore, the court upheld the examination and ruled that a retest was not necessary. Additionally, the Supreme Court transferred any and all individual petitions to the respective jurisdictional High Courts, barring those which were disposed off or resolved by its judgment.

== Reactions ==
=== National Testing Agency and Government ===
The National Testing Agency (NTA) initially denied the allegations of a paper leak, acknowledging only that an incorrect paper had been distributed at an exam center in Sawai Madhopur, Rajasthan. After the results were announced, the NTA issued a clarification regarding the inflated ranks and the higher number of toppers. The NTA conducted an investigation into the paper leak allegations and released a public notice declaring these claims to be "completely baseless and without any ground." On 6 June 2024, the NTA issued an official clarification notice refuting the suspicions of a paper leak and justified the early results declaration.

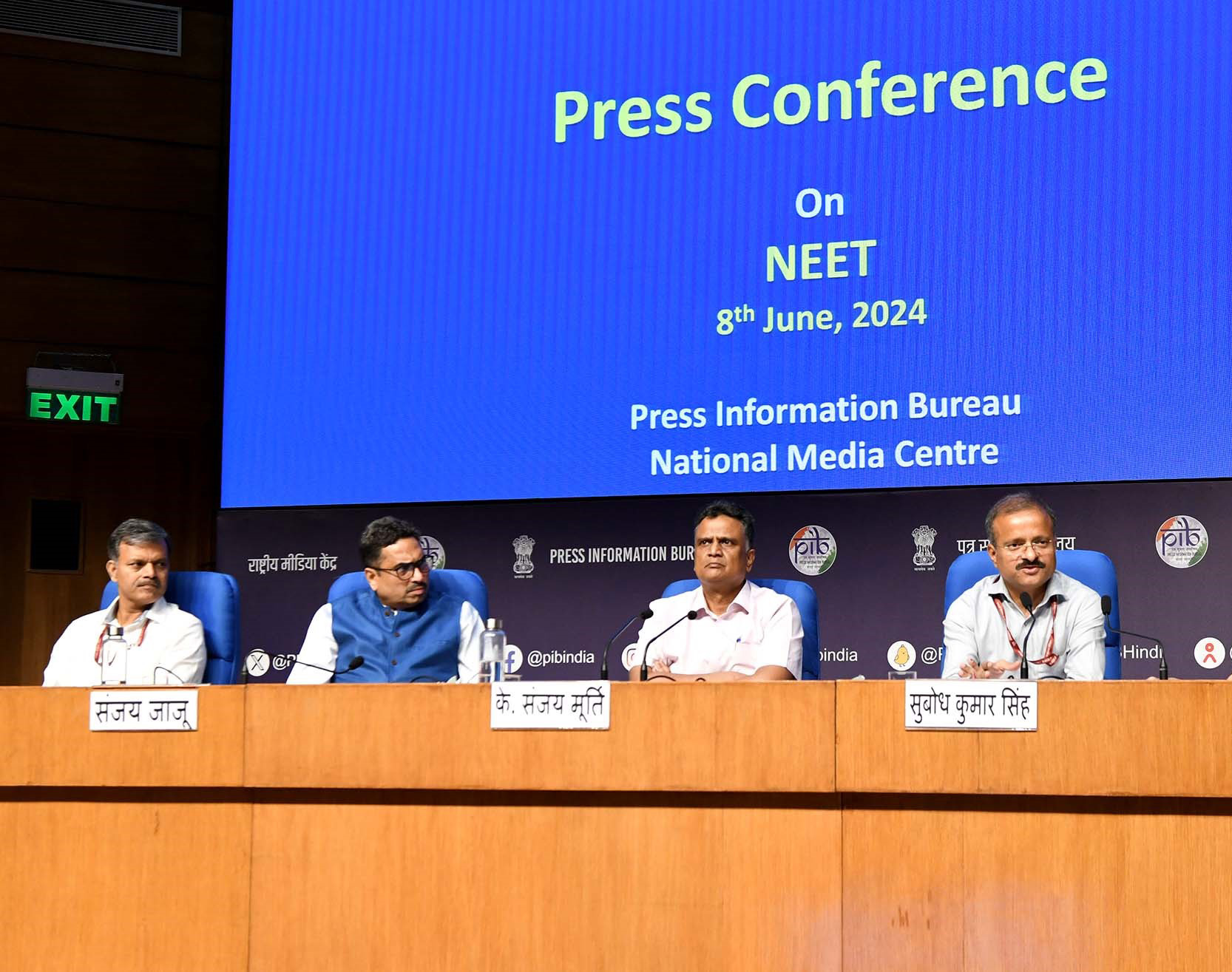
Press conference by the National Testing Agency on NEET.

On 8 June 2024, the NTA and the Ministry of Education announced in a press conference that a four-member committee would be formed to investigate the results of the 1,563 students who were given grace marks. NTA Director General Subodh Kumar Singh denied any irregularities in the results during the press conference. He explained that the grace marks and a relatively easier paper compared to previous years were the reasons for the 67 top rankers. On 13 June 2024, Union Minister of Education, Dharmendra Pradhan rejected the allegations of a paper leak as baseless, stating that "the allegations of corruption in the NTA are unfounded."

On 19 June 2024, the Education Ministry cancelled the UGC–NET June 2024 examination which was conducted on 18 June 2024 in pen-paper (OMR) mode following inputs from the Indian Cyber Crime Coordination Centre (I4C) suggesting that the exam's integrity may have been compromised. The next day, in a press conference, Pradhan revealed that the question paper had been leaked on the Darknet. Addressing the NEET issue, he took moral responsibility for the loss of faith among students. Regarding the exam cancellation, he emphasized that the future of many candidates from rural areas should not be held hostage due to isolated incidents. He also announced that a high-level committee would be formed to review the structure and functioning of the NTA. This committee, headed by former ISRO chairman Koppillil Radhakrishnan, also included former AIIMS director Randeep Guleria, among others.

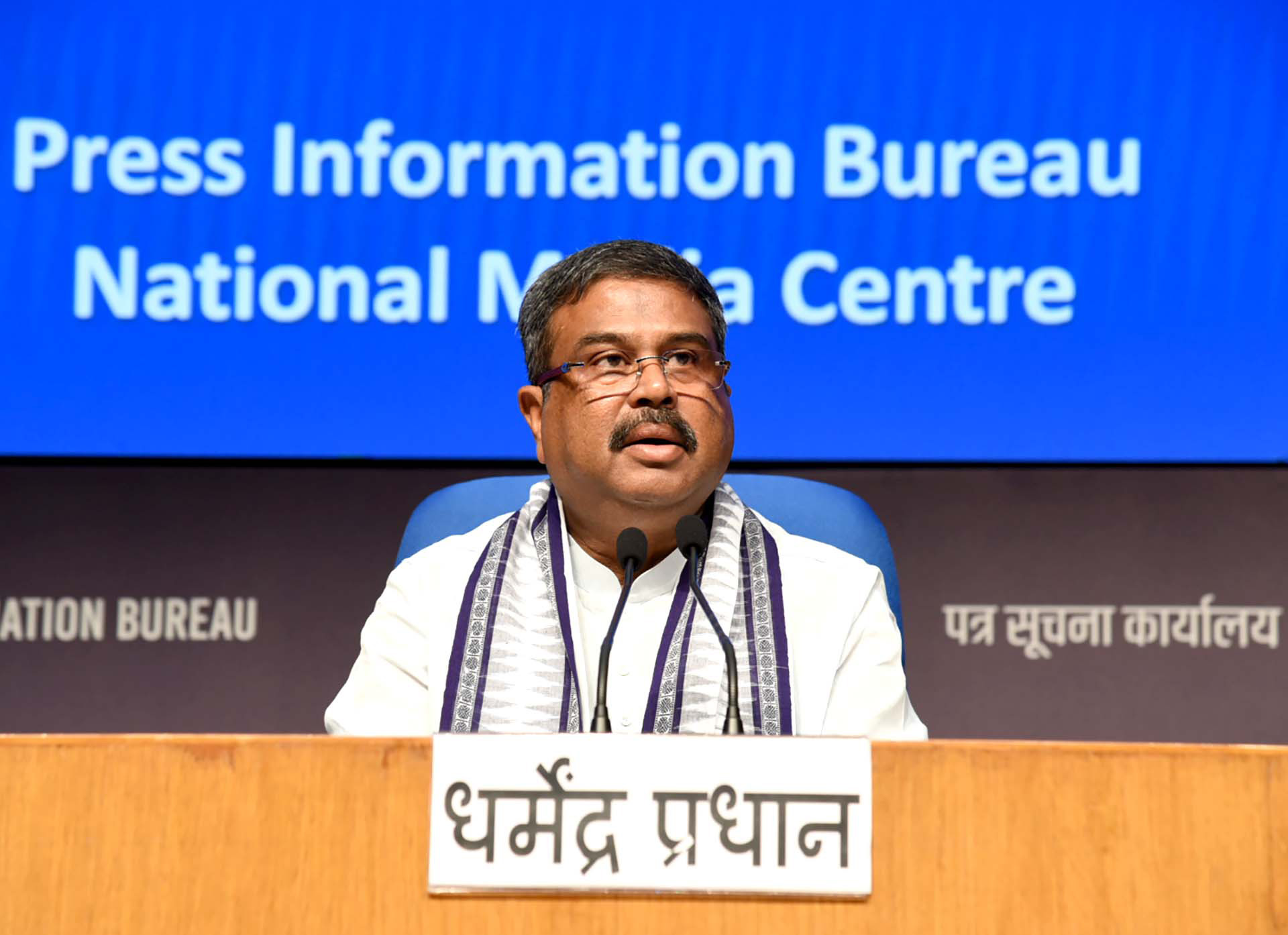
Union Minister of Education Dharmendra Pradhan addressed a press conference on the NEET issue on 20 June 2024.

On 21 June 2024, the Government of India implemented the Public Examinations (Prevention of Unfair Means) Act, 2024, an anti-cheating law originally passed by Parliament in February 2024. The NEET 2024 controversy led to the cancellation or postponement of several other examinations. On the same day, the NTA announced the postponement of the CSIR-UGC NET examination, citing unavoidable circumstances and logistical challenges. The next day, the government postponed the NEET (PG) examination a day before it was scheduled from 23 June 2024 to 11 August 2024, as a precautionary measure due to recent allegations concerning the integrity of competitive examinations. The CUET-UG 2024 result scheduled on 30 June 2024 was postponed to 28 July 2024. On 22 June 2024, the government dismissed NTA's Director General Subodh Kumar Singh from his position and handed the case related to NEET (UG) irregularities to the CBI. On 27 June 2024, President of India Droupadi Murmu, in her address to the 18th Lok Sabha, stated,

Regarding the recent instances of paper leaks in some examinations, my government is committed to a fair investigation and ensuring strict punishment for the culprits.

=== Public response ===
Following the announcement of the exam results, hashtags protesting the outcomes began trending on social media. Students called for an investigation into the examination process and urged a re-examination. Several public educators and educational technology companies raised debates in the media, questioning the authenticity of the exam. This had led to nation-wide protests where several student organizations protested against the NTA, demanding the cancellation of NEET and a re-examination. They also called for the resignation of Education Minister Pradhan. The Indian Youth Congress (IYC), the youth wing of the Indian National Congress (INC), held a protest at Jantar Mantar in New Delhi. The National Students' Union of India (NSUI), the student wing of the Congress party, also held protests against the exam. A delegation of the Akhil Bharatiya Vidyarthi Parishad (ABVP), the student wing of the Rashtriya Swayamsevak Sangh (RSS), met with the education minister, demanding a CBI probe into the matter.

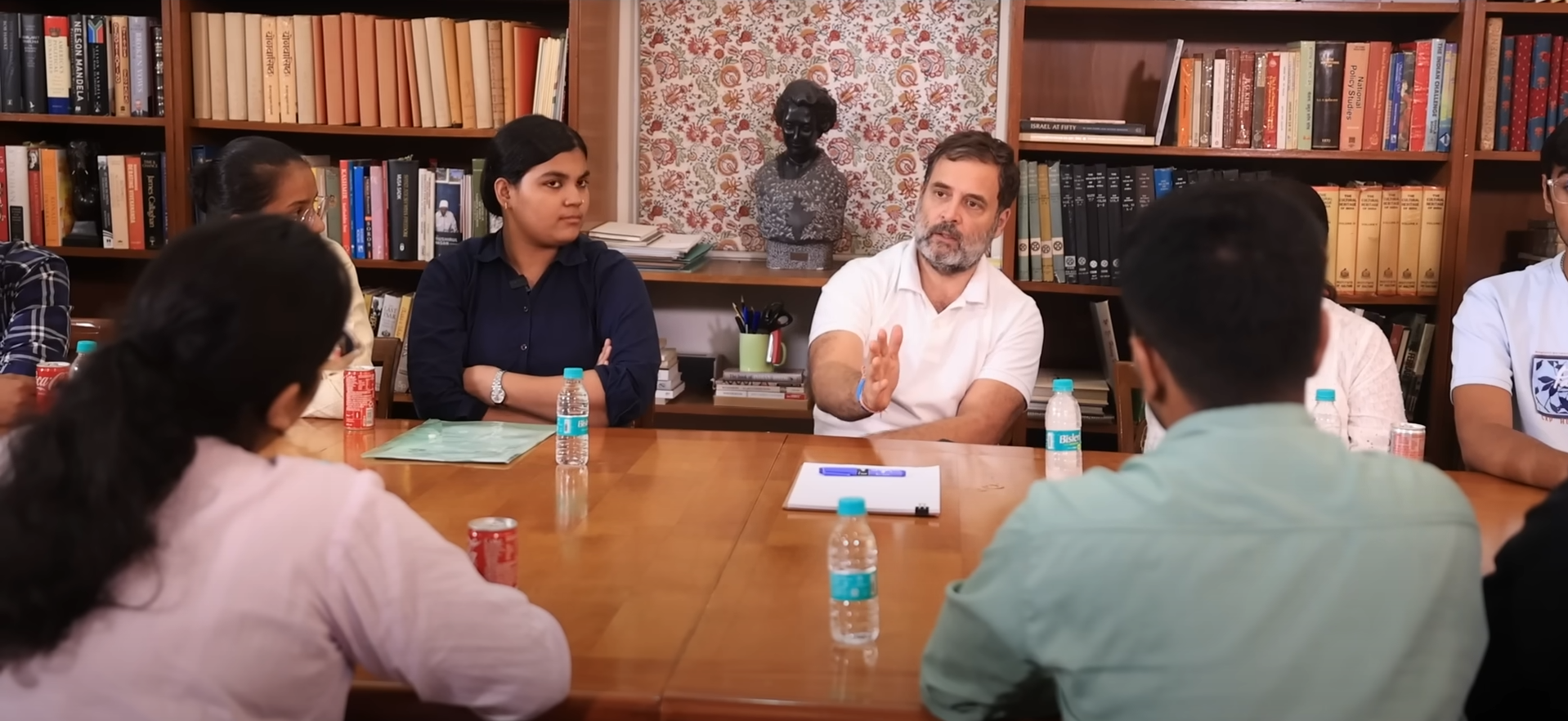
Leader of the Opposition, Rahul Gandhi, meeting with NEET aspirants.

General Secretary of the Indian National Congress, Priyanka Gandhi, questioned the government about ignoring student complaints. Leader of the Opposition in the Lok Sabha, Rahul Gandhi, criticized the government on this issue, assuring students, "I will become your voice in Parliament and strongly raise the issues related to your future." Congress President Mallikarjun Kharge also attacked the government, accusing it of covering up the NEET scam. Congress spokesperson Pawan Khera likened the NEET scam to Vyapam scam, claiming that the Modi government wants to whitewash it. On 21 June 2024, Rahul Gandhi released a video on his social media, showing him meeting with NEET aspirants. On 1 July 2024, during his speech in the Lok Sabha, Gandhi referred to the exam as a "commercial exam" rather than a "professional one," arguing that "it is designed to suit rich students."

On 22 July 2024, during the budget session of the Lok Sabha, Gandhi again questioned the government on the NEET (UG) issue, accusing it of lacking accountability and transparency. Pradhan defended the NTA, stating that over the past seven years, more than 240 exams had been conducted without controversy. He assured the students that there would be a transparent investigation.

== See also ==
- National Testing Agency controversies
- National Eligibility cum Entrance Test (Undergraduate)
- Medical education in India
- Vyapam scam
- National Council of Educational Research and Training
- NCERT textbook controversies
- 2026 NEET controversy
