= Dharmendra Pradhan =

Indian politician (born 1969)

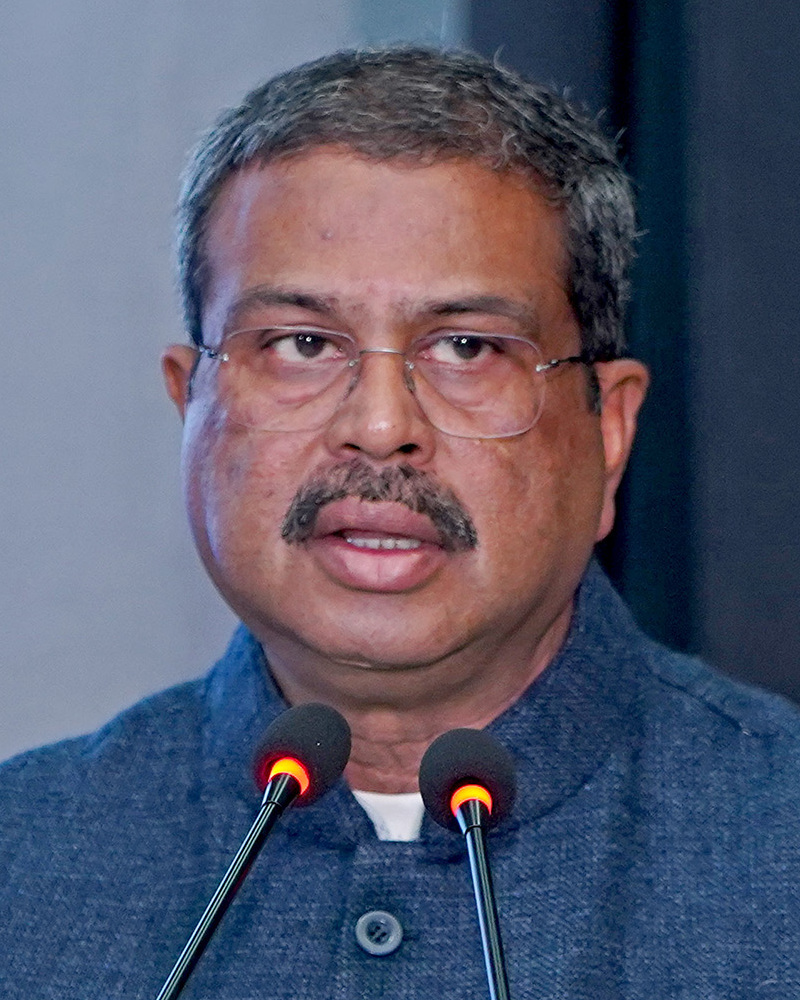
- Pradhan in 2026

Union Minister of Education
- In office 7 July 2021 – 25 July 2026
- President: Ramnath Kovind; Droupadi Murmu
- Prime Minister: Narendra Modi
- Preceded by: Ramesh Pokhriyal
- Succeeded by: Pralhad Joshi (additional charge)

Union Minister of Skill Development and Entrepreneurship
- In office 3 September 2017 – 9 June 2024
- President: Ramnath Kovind; Droupadi Murmu
- Prime Minister: Narendra Modi
- Preceded by: Rajiv Pratap Rudy
- Succeeded by: Jayant Chaudhary (as MoS I/C)

Union Minister of Steel
- In office 30 May 2019 – 7 July 2021
- President: Ramnath Kovind
- Prime Minister: Narendra Modi
- Preceded by: Chaudhary Birender Singh
- Succeeded by: Ramchandra Prasad Singh

Union Minister of Petroleum and Natural Gas
- In office 26 May 2014 – 7 July 2021
- Prime Minister: Narendra Modi
- Preceded by: Veerappa Moily
- Succeeded by: Hardeep Singh Puri

Member of Parliament, Lok Sabha
- Incumbent
- Assumed office 4 June 2024
- Preceded by: Nitesh Ganga Deb
- Constituency: Sambalpur, Odisha
- In office 2004 - 2009
- Preceded by: Debendra Pradhan
- Constituency: Deogarh, Odisha

Member of Parliament, Rajya Sabha
- In office 4 April 2018 – 3 April 2024
- Preceded by: Prakash Javadekar
- Constituency: Madhya Pradesh
- In office 3 April 2012 – 2 April 2018
- Succeeded by: Manoj Jha
- Constituency: Bihar

Member of Odisha Legislative Assembly
- In office 5 March 2000 – 15 May 2004
- Preceded by: Bibhudhendra Pratap Das (INC)
- Succeeded by: Nrusingha Sahu (INC)
- Constituency: Pallahara

Personal details
- Born: 26 June 1969 (age 57) Talcher, Odisha, India
- Party: Bharatiya Janata Party
- Spouse: Mridula Pradhan (m. 1998)
- Children: 2
- Parent: Debendra Pradhan (father)
- Education: Utkal University (M.A)
- Occupation: Social worker; politician

Dharmendra Pradhan (born 26 June 1969) is an Indian politician who served as the 9th Minister of Education from 2021 until his resignation in 2026. He previously served as Minister of Petroleum and Natural Gas from 2014 to 2021, Minister of Steel from 2019 to 2021, and Minister of Skill Development and Entrepreneurship from 2017 to 2024. Pradhan is currently a member of the Indian parliament representing the Sambalpur constituency in the Lok Sabha as a member of the Bharatiya Janata Party. Previously, he has also served as a member of Rajya Sabha representing Bihar and Madhya Pradesh.

His tenure as the union education minister was marred with irregularities, including leakage of the scripts for 2024 and 2026 NEET (UG) exams. The government conducted a re-examination involving over 2.2 million students after the 2026 leakage. The irregularities led to suicides of at least 12 students, and has served as a catalyst to the 2026 Jantar Mantar protests in Delhi calling for Pradhan's resignation. The protests turned violent, with clashes occurring between protestors and law enforcement officials, followed by negotiations between government and protestors and resignation of Pradhan.

== Early life and education ==
Pradhan was born on 26 June 1969 in Talcher, Odisha, to Debendra Pradhan, who served as Minister of State in the Vajpayee ministry (1998–2004), and Basanta Manjari Pradhan. Pradhan hails from the Chasa community. He became active in student politics through the Akhil Bharatiya Vidyarthi Parishad (ABVP) in 1983 while at Talcher College, serving as president and later secretary of the student union. He earned a postgraduate degree in Anthropology from Utkal University in Bhubaneswar.

== Political career ==
=== Early political career ===
Pradhan was elected to the Odisha Legislative Assembly from Pallahara in 2000. He entered the Lok Sabha in 2004 representing Deogarh until the constituency was abolished in 2009. He also served as National President of the Bharatiya Janata Yuva Morcha (BJYM) from 2004 to 2006, and held various party positions including National Secretary and All India General Secretary of the Bharatiya Janata Party (BJP).

=== Ministerial tenures ===
==== Petroleum and Natural Gas (2014–2021) ====
Appointed as Minister of State (Independent Charge) for Petroleum and Natural Gas in 2014, Pradhan was elevated to Cabinet rank in 2017. During his tenure, he oversaw initiatives such as the Pradhan Mantri Ujjwala Yojana, which aimed to expand LPG access in rural India. The ministry also implemented the Hydrocarbon Exploration and Licensing Policy, the PAHAL subsidy reform, and campaigns encouraging voluntary subsidy relinquishment. Investments exceeding USD 60 billion were made to expand city gas distribution networks. He also laid the foundation of Urja Ganga Gas Pipeline network, provisioning free LPG connections and plugging cooking gas subsidy diversions.

==== Steel (2019–2021) ====
As Minister of Steel, Pradhan launched initiatives including Ispati Irada and Mission Purvodaya to increase production capacity, strengthen the secondary steel sector, and promote job creation and regional industrial growth.

==== Skill Development and Entrepreneurship (2017–2024) ====
Pradhan implemented programs aimed at reskilling and upskilling the workforce, expanding ITI infrastructure by over 40% and increasing enrollment by 28% until 2019. The National Council for Vocational Education and Training (NCVET) and the Skill Saathi platform were established to standardize training and support trainees.

==== Education (2021–2026) ====
Pradhan assumed office as Minister of Education in July 2021. He oversaw reforms to the National Testing Agency (NTA) and the implementation of policies aimed at improving entrance examinations, including commissioning a committee led by former ISRO chief Koppillil Radhakrishnan. In 2024, the ministry faced scrutiny following the 2024 NEET controversy. The Supreme Court of India found no evidence of large-scale malpractice, though isolated incidents led to over 100 arrests.

=== NEET paper leak (2026) ===
In 2026, NEET-UG again became the subject of controversy after the National Testing Agency (NTA) cancelled the 3 May examination amid paper-leak allegations and scheduled a re-examination for 21 June 2026. On 6 June 2026, supporters of the Cockroach Janta Party, a satirical youth-led political movement, held a protest at Jantar Mantar in New Delhi and demanded Pradhan's resignation over examination leaks and marking-related concerns. On 25 July 2026, Pradhan resigned his position as Education Minister.

== Personal life ==
Pradhan is married to Mridula Pradhan since 1998 and has two children. He resides in New Delhi.

== See also ==
- Third Modi ministry
- Bharatiya Janata Party
