= 2026 CBSE On-Screen Marking controversy =

Education controversy in India

- Date: May 2026
- Location: India
- Type: Education controversy
- Cause: Implementation of On-Screen Marking (OSM) system for Class 12 board exams
- Participants: Students, parents, teachers, CBSE officials, politicians
- Outcome: Reduced re-evaluation fees, rescanning of thousands of answer sheets, internal probes, leadership changes at CBSE

In 2026, the Central Board of Secondary Education (CBSE) in India received public backlash following the implementation of its new On-Screen Marking (OSM) system for the Grade 12 board examinations.

The OSM system involved scanning physical answer sheets of the students and evaluating them digitally. After the Class 12 results were announced on 13 May 2026, many students reported issues such as blurred scans, missing pages, mismatched answer sheets, unmarked answers, and unexpected marks. The concerns led to calls for re-evaluation and public discussion. Questions were also raised about the OSM contract awarded to Coempt Eduteck and reported security vulnerabilities in the system.

== Background ==
The 2026 CBSE examination cycle involved simultaneous technological and pedagogical changes. A primary element of this transition was the digitisation of the evaluation infrastructure.

=== On-Screen Marking (OSM) system ===
Prior to the 2026 academic cycle, the CBSE evaluation process required the physical transportation of answer books to regional evaluation centers. On 9 February 2026, the board issued a circular mandating the implementation of an On-Screen Marking (OSM) system for Class 12 answer books. Class 10 evaluations remained in the traditional physical format for that session.

Under the OSM framework, physical answer booklets were transported to CBSE Regional Offices for scanning. The scanned images were uploaded to a centralized portal where evaluators assessed the answers digitally. The board stated this system was intended to eliminate manual calculation errors, prevent skipped answers, accelerate result declarations, and reduce the physical transport of materials.

The rollout required affiliated schools to upgrade their IT infrastructure to serve as evaluation nodes. Schools were mandated to provide dedicated computer labs, public static IP addresses, minimum internet speeds of 2 Mbit/s, and uninterruptible power supply (UPS).

=== Coempt Eduteck ===
The digital evaluation contract was awarded to Coempt Eduteck, a Hyderabad-based educational technology firm. Corporate records indicate the company previously operated as Globarena Technologies Private Limited.

Under its former name, the firm was contracted by the Telangana State Board of Intermediate Education in 2019. Following the deployment of their software, over 380,000 out of 970,000 students failed their intermediate exams, leading to statewide protests, reported student suicides, and notices from the National Human Rights Commission (NHRC).

Following the Telangana incident, Globarena Technologies changed its name to Coempt Edu Tech Private Limited, with VSN Raju maintaining his position as CEO. Raju denied that the name change was deceptive, stating that clients were informed of the transition. He noted that the Supreme Court of India cleared the company of wrongdoing in a 2019 ruling, which calculated the actual evaluation error rate at 0.16% and rejected pleas for criminal charges against the firm.

== Controversy ==
Under this new OSM framework, approximately 9,866,000 answer sheets were scanned and evaluated digitally by around 70,000 evaluators across the country. Following the declaration of Class 12 results on 13 May 2026, a substantial drop in the overall pass percentage from 88.39% in the previous year to 85.2% sparked panic among students and parents.

Large-scale complaints emerged on social media platforms as students alleged getting unexpectedly low marks especially in core subjects like Physics, Chemistry, Biology, and Mathematics. Students and teachers criticised the board for charging too much fees for answer sheet photocopies even though the board already has all the answer sheets of all the students scanned.

Upon applying for scanned copies under the board's verification process, students reported serious technical glitches, incorrect fee deduction and payment gateway failures. The board said that the portal faced unprecedented traffic and several attempts of unauthorised interference. The initial deadline of 22 May for receiving the answersheet was extended multiple times till 25 May 2026. The CBSE received 4,04,319 applications from students for obtaining scanned copies of answer books, far higher than the previous year, which indicates the lack of trust in the new system. Students who received the copies flagged blurred answer sheets, missing pages, and, in some cases, received another student's answer sheets.

The controversy intensified significantly when a Delhi-based student, Vedant Shrivastava, shared evidence on social media that his Physics answer sheet uploaded under his roll number featured different handwriting and belonged to someone else. Soon after, he became the target of trolling and abusive comments online. Some called him "anti-national", while others labelled him "Pakistani". Among those who initially called the student a "Pakistani" was Doordarshan News journalist Ashok Shrivastav. He later apologised, but his remarks sparked backlash online. After the complaint went viral, CBSE officially acknowledged the technical error, issued the correct answer sheet to the student, and promised to rectify his result.

The board faced further backlash following allegations that it attempted to manage public perception rather than addressing structural evaluation errors. Reports surfaced indicating that CBSE had allegedly circulated a communication toolkit to schools and forced school principals to flood social media with coordinated videos and posts defending its controversial On-Screen Marking System (OSM). Independent observers and online watchdogs noted a coordinated pattern where multiple school principals and institutions published videos using identical phrasing to praise the digital evaluation system. Furthermore, students on platforms like Reddit alleged that certain schools were putting immense pressure on them to upload public statements defending the accuracy of the OSM system.

A 17-year-old student, Sarthak Sidhant, questioned CBSE's appointment of Coempt Eduteck for the OSM programme. He noted that the company, formerly known as Globarena, was involved in the 2019 Telangana intermediate results controversy, where evaluation errors led to over 380,000 students failing and 21 suicides. Later, he appeared in front of Parliamentary committee to present his findings.

Another student, Nisarga Adhikary, who is a 19-year-old ethical hacker, claimed that he found serious security flaws in the OSM portal. He reported them to Indian Computer Emergency Response Team. Adhikary alleged that attackers could access examiner accounts using publicly available details and a password exposed in the system's code. He later claimed that the answer sheets and question papers stored on an Amazon Web Services server were publicly accessible online due to improper configuration.

== Response ==
Initially, CBSE defended the system by calling it secure and robust. However, it later admitted there were security gaps.

The board constantly faced criticism regarding portal glitches and high fees for scanned photocopies and verification. Due to this, the board had to reduce the fees for scanned photocopies from ₹700 to ₹100 per subject, fees for verification from ₹500 to ₹100 per subject, and fees for re-evaluation from ₹100 to ₹25 per question. Further it was decided to extend the dates for obtaining scanned copies and re-evaluation/verification.

The Ministry of Education initiated reviews, which led to the removal of CBSE Chairman Rahul Singh and Secretary Himanshu Gupta. In response to the entire situation, protests occurred outside the CBSE headquarters in New Delhi, with the Leader of the Opposition Rahul Gandhi demanding a judicial probe.

== See also ==
- NCERT textbook controversies
- 2024 NEET controversy
- 2026 NEET controversy
