= Common Management Admission Test =

Indian admissions test

Common Management Admission Test (CMAT) is an online computer-based test conducted by the National Testing Agency (NTA), India. It is a national-level admission test for facilitating institutions to select suitable students for admission in all management programmes approved by AICTE.

The first edition of CMAT was conducted in 2012. In 2014, the first CMAT was conducted between 20 February and 24 February. Around 1.2 lakh candidates participated in the test. The results were declared on 14 March 2014.

== History ==
By 2011, there were a number of entrance exams for management programmes in India. These included CAT, JMET, XAT, Gitam SAT, NMAT, SNAP, MAT, state-specific exams, exams conducted by management associations of MBA institutes and exams conducted by private colleges. AICTE launched CMAT to reduce the burden (physical, mental and financial stress) of students in attending to multiple examinations.

Until 2015, CMAT was held twice in a year but last year the practice was abolished as AICTE decided to hold the exam once a year on the third Sunday of January.

Some of business schools have decided to keep out from CMAT. The reason given for this decision was the "late announcement" by AICTE. However, a number of colleges accept their score.

== Format ==
CMAT is a three-hour test. In 2012, it was conducted in a period of nine days (20–28 February) in two shifts at 61 locations in all over India.

The better of two scores will be used for admission for 2014–15.

The question paper comprises four sections:

- Quantitative technique
- Logical reasoning
- Language comprehension
- General awareness

There are 25 questions in each section. While each correct answer carries four marks, each wrong answer carries carry one negative marking.

AICTE has now decided to conduct CMAT in foreign countries for facilitating eligible NRIs/PIOs and foreign nationals to appear in CMAT for seeking admission in institutions in India following CMAT merit list for 2014-15 under special provisions defined in AICTE Approval Process and against all vacancies left after completion of centralized admission in management institutions.

=== CMAT Eligibility ===
AICTE has certified the qualification criteria to appear for CMAT, which must be fulfilled by every one of the applicants interested in taking this test. It must be guaranteed that the applicants must fulfill the qualification conditions of CMAT, before filling the application form. Non-fulfillment of the same may lead to disqualification of the candidate regardless of the stage of admission an applicant will be. The qualification standards are as under:

- The candidate should be an Indian citizen and can apply for the test irrespective of his or her age.
- He/she should have a Graduation degree in any discipline from a recognized University or Institute.
- Additionally, last year pursuing students of Graduate courses whose results will be announced before beginning of admissions for the academic year 2017-18 were also qualified to apply.
- No age limitation.
- Graduates with 50% in any discipline
- Final year students of Graduate Courses can also apply

== Other countries ==
CMAT is also conducted by the Tribhuvan University of Nepal in compulsion to get admission in management faculty of the university. The students are required to obtain at least 40 marks to attend the classes of Bachelor in Business Administration (BBA), Bachelor in Information Management (BIM), Bachelor in Business Management (BBM), Bachelor in Hotel Management (BHM), and Bachelor in Travel and Tourism Management (BTTM).

== See also ==
- Public service commissions in India
