= Pralhad Joshi =

Indian politician (born 1962)

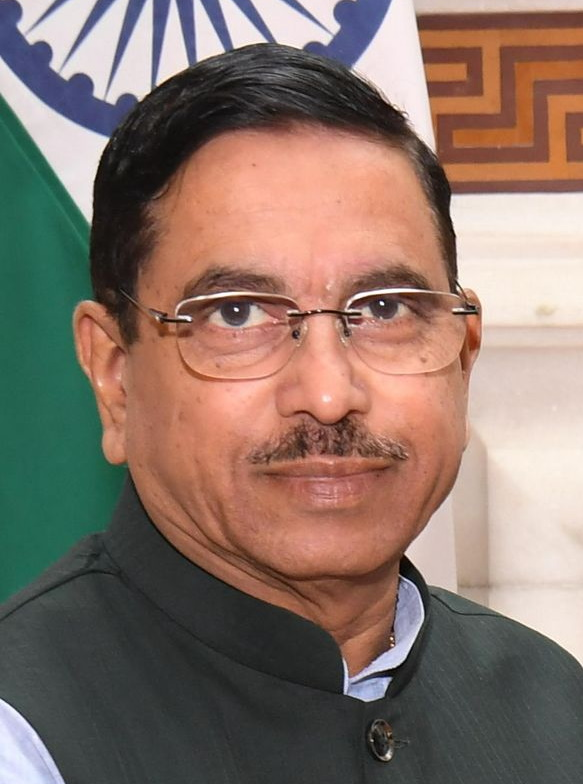
- Joshi in 2024

Union Minister of Education (Note: Additional charge)
- Incumbent
- Assumed office 26 July 2026
- President: Droupadi Murmu
- Prime Minister: Narendra Modi
- Preceded by: Dharmendra Pradhan

Union Minister of Consumer Affairs, Food and Public Distribution
- Incumbent
- Assumed office 10 June 2024
- Prime Minister: Narendra Modi
- Preceded by: Piyush Goyal

Union Minister of New and Renewable Energy
- Incumbent
- Assumed office 10 June 2024
- Prime Minister: Narendra Modi
- Preceded by: Raj Kumar Singh
Other ministerial offices
Union Minister of Coal
In office 30 May 2019 – 10 June 2024
Prime Minister	Narendra Modi
Preceded by	Piyush Goyal
Succeeded by	G. Kisan Reddy
Union Minister of Mines
In office 30 May 2019 – 10 June 2024
Prime Minister	Narendra Modi
Preceded by	Narendra Singh Tomar
Succeeded by	G. Kisan Reddy
Union Minister of Parliamentary Affairs
In office 30 May 2019 – 10 June 2024
Prime Minister	Narendra Modi
Preceded by	Narendra Singh Tomar
Succeeded by	Kiren Rijiju

President of the Bharatiya Janata Party, Karnataka
- In office 12 July 2012 – 12 January 2016
- Preceded by: K. S. Eshwarappa
- Succeeded by: B. S. Yediyurappa

Member of Parliament, Lok Sabha
- Incumbent
- Assumed office 24 May 2004
- Preceded by: Vijay Sankeshwar
- Constituency: Dharwad

Personal details
- Born: 27 November 1962 (age 63) Bijapur, Mysore State, India (present-day Karnataka)
- Party: Bharatiya Janata Party
- Spouse: Jyothi Joshi (m. 1992)
- Children: 3
- Education: Shri Kadasiddheshwar Arts College and HS Kotambri Science Institute
- Occupation: Politician

Pralhad Venkatesh Joshi (born 27 November 1962) is an Indian politician who is currently serving as the 13th Minister of Consumer Affairs, Food and Public Distribution and 10th Minister of New and Renewable Energy since 2024. In July 2026, Joshi assumed office of the 10th Minister of Education while continuing to hold his existing portfolios in the Union Cabinet.

He was also the Union Minister of Parliamentary Affairs, and played a prominent role in the smooth passing of crucial bills like Abrogation of Article 370, Citizenship Amendment Bill and many more in both the houses. He also served as the Minister of Coal and the Minister of Mines from 2019 to 2024. Joshi has also been a Member of Parliament in the Lok Sabha since 2004, representing the Dharwad Lok Sabha constituency. He was also the State President of Bharatiya Janata Party, Karnataka (BJP) from 2014 to 2016. He served in the panel of chairpersons of the Lok Sabha (2014–2018).

In July 2026, following the resignation of Dharmendra Pradhan amid the NEET 2026 Paper leak controversy and criticism over the management of the National Testing Agency (NTA), Joshi assumed office as the 10th Minister of Education while continuing to hold his existing portfolios in the Union Cabinet.

Joshi first came to public notice with Rashtriya Swayamsevak Sangh (RSS) when they organised a movement to hoist the Flag of India at the Idagah Maidan Hubli, Karnataka during 1992–1994. Recently, the Supreme Court of India has upheld the Karnataka High Court order restoring the ownership of the said maidan to the Hubli-Dharwad Municipal Corporation. He has been elected to Lok Sabha in the general elections of 2004, 2009, 2014, 2019 and 2024.

== Early life and education ==
Pralhad Joshi was born on 27 November 1962 in Bijapur, Mysore State, India, to father, Venkatesh Joshi, and mother, Malatibai Joshi. He is from a Brahmin family. His father was an Indian Railways employee and Joshi is the third child of his parents. Joshi's primary education was in the Railway School, his secondary education in New English School in Hubli, and for his higher education, Joshi graduated from Shri Kadasiddeshwar Arts College in Hubli.

== Early political career ==
An industrialist by vocation in his early days, Pralhad Joshi ingratiated himself into the political fray by organising a movement to hoist the tri-colour flag at Idagah Maidan in Hubli from 1992 to 1994. He also led the "Save Kashmir Movement" during those years, which established him as a known figure in those regions of the state. He was then elected the president of Bharatiya Janata Party (BJP) in Dharwad district. He first contested in the 14th Lok Sabha elections in 2004, where he won from the Dharwad Lok Sabha constituency by defeating INC's B.S Patil.

He's won three consecutive elections from that constituency and is the incumbent MP of Dharwad. In the 2009 General elections, he won by the second-highest margin amidst 28 constituencies in Karnataka, while most of the ministers and Members of Parliament secured a loss in the same year.

In 2019, he retained the Dharwad seat for a second term by a margin of over one lakh votes.

Joshi has been a member of the Rashtriya Swayamsevak Sangh (RSS) from a young age.

== Union ministerships (from 2019) ==
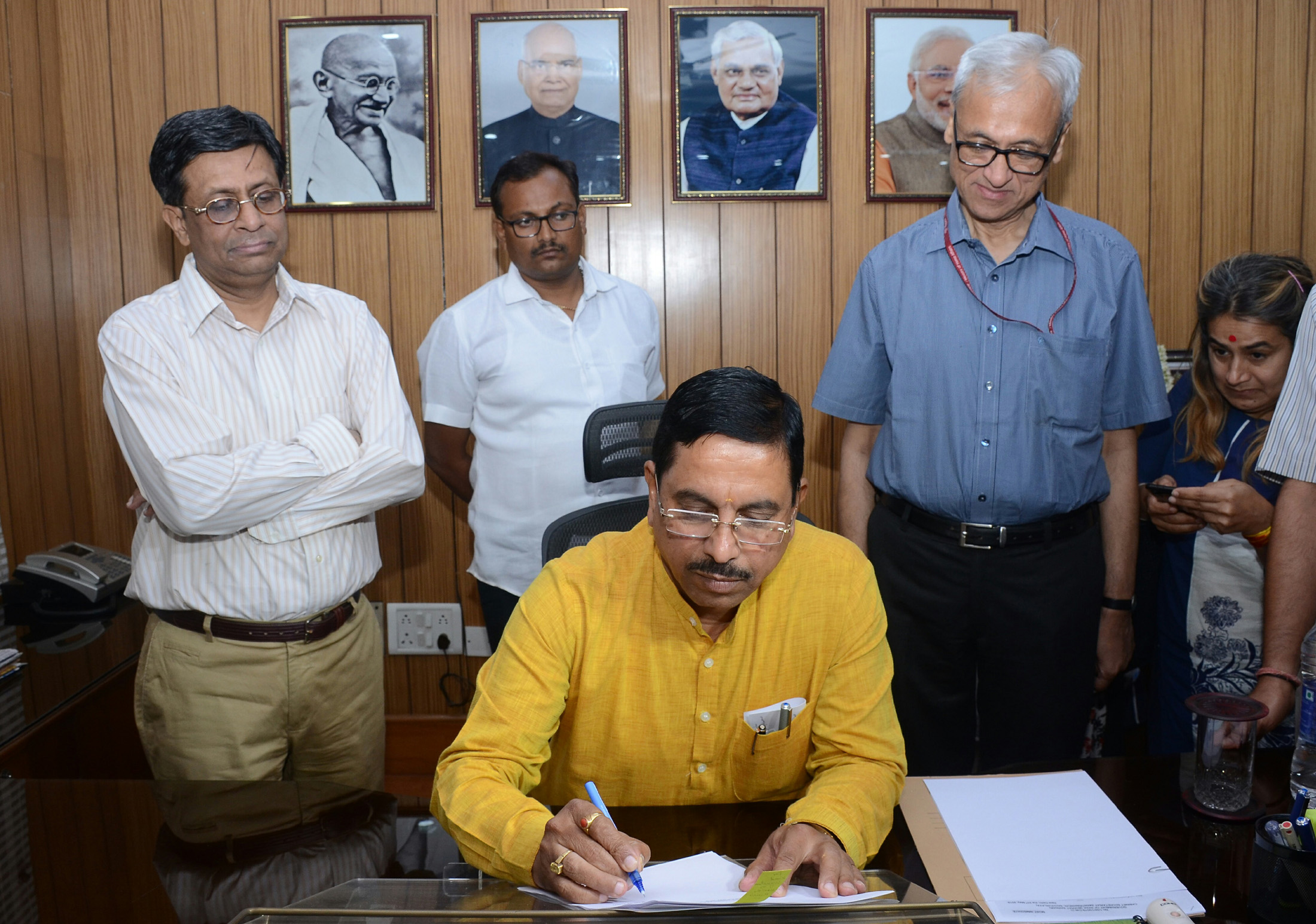
Pralhad Joshi taking charge as the Minister of Coal on 31 May 2019

Joshi took oath as a Cabinet minister on 30 May 2019, and he was appointed the Minister of Parliamentary Affairs, the Minister of Coal and the Minister of Mines. His tenure in these ministerial posts lasted till June 2024, and after the 2024 Indian general election, Joshi was appointed the Minister of Consumer Affairs, Food and Public Distribution and the Minister of New and Renewable Energy in June 2024. Joshi's win, for the fifth time in a row, from the Dharwad Lok Sabha constituency was a record of consecutive wins by any candidate in the constituency; however Joshi stated that he was unhappy due to winning with a reduced vote margin.

After nationwide student protests over the 2026 NEET paper leak controversy, which lead to the resignation of Minister of Education Dharmendra Pradhan on 25 July, Joshi was handed the additional charge of the Education minister.

== Personal life ==
Joshi married Jyoti Joshi on 26 November 1992, and they have three daughters. He has interests in reading, Indian classical music and cricket.

== See also ==
- Second Modi ministry
- Third Modi ministry

Lok Sabha
Preceded by Vijay Sankeshwar	Member of Parliament for Dharwad North; 2004–2009	Succeeded by Constituency ceased to exist
Preceded by Constituency created	Member of Parliament for Dharwad; 2009–present	Incumbent
Political offices
Preceded by Narendra Singh Tomar	Minister of Parliamentary Affairs; 31 May 2019 – 10 June 2024	
Preceded by Piyush Goyal	Minister of Coal; 31 May 2019 – 10 June 2024	
Preceded by Piyush Goyal	Minister of Consumer Affairs, Food and Public Distribution; 10 June 2024–present	Incumbent
Preceded by Piyush Goyal	Ministry of New and Renewable Energy; 10 June 2024–present	Incumbent
Preceded by Narendra Singh Tomar	Minister of Mines; 31 May 2019 – 10 June 2024	
