= 2026 NEET scandal =

Controversy in conduct of NEET(UG) 2026

2026 NEET paper leak
- Date: 3 May 2026
- Location: India
- Type: Examination scandal
- Cause: Paper leak and irregularities
- Participants: National Testing Agency, students, Central Bureau of Investigation, Rajasthan Police
- Outcome: Cancellation of the 3 May examination; re-examination scheduled; resignation of Education minister; CBI probe and arrests

The 2026 NEET scandal in India involved a paper leak and other examination irregularities affecting the National Eligibility cum Entrance Test (Undergraduate), or NEET-UG, conducted by India's National Testing Agency (NTA). The examination, which was held on 3 May 2026 for more than 2.27 million candidates seeking admission to undergraduate medical and dental programs, was cancelled on 12 May 2026 after investigators found substantial overlap between a 'guess paper' with sample questions circulated before the exam, leading to the arrest of several people, including National Testing Agency officials.

A replacement examination ("re-NEET") was announced for June 2026. At least 12 students who were scheduled to retake the exam took their own lives.

The controversy led to protests, political criticism, and petitions to the Supreme Court of India. It drew comparisons with the 2024 NEET controversy. On 25 July 2026, Dharmendra Pradhan, the education minister, resigned.

== Background ==
The NEET-UG, formerly known as the All India Pre-Medical Test (AIPMT), is an Indian nationwide entrance examination conducted by the National Testing Agency (NTA) for admission to undergraduate medical programs. As a mandatory exam for admission in medical programs, it is the largest exam in India in terms of number of applicants.

After the enactment of the NMC Act 2019 in September 2019, the NEET-UG became the sole entrance test for admissions to medical colleges in India including the All India Institutes of Medical Sciences (AIIMS) and Jawaharlal Institute of Postgraduate Medical Education & Research (JIPMER), which until then conducted separate exams.

In 2024, a similar controversy arose when on 5 May, the day of the NEET-UG examination, several social media posts alleged the exam questions were leaked in advance.

== Leak and exam cancellation ==
Soon after the exam on 3 May, allegations emerged of a guess paper or question bank being shared through WhatsApp and other channels in coaching centers like Sikar, Rajasthan, which closely matched many questions in the actual exam, especially in Chemistry and Biology. According to the reports, there was an overlap of up to 120 questions out of 180 questions.

Shashikant Suthar, a chemistry teacher from Sikar, informed the authorities about the circulation of the leaked questions after comparing the material with the official exam paper, noting nearly 140 questions which matched the actual exam paper. The Rajasthan Police Special Operations Group started an investigation, which led to several arrests. Later, the case was transferred to the Central Bureau of Investigation (CBI).

On 12 May 2026, the NTA announced that the exam was cancelled and that a repeat examination would be held. In a statement posted on X, the NTA stated that the decision was taken "in the interest of students" and to protect the credibility of the national examination system. It confirmed that the exam would be rescheduled on dates to be announced separately. It said that the fees already paid by candidates would be returned and no fresh registrations or additional fees would be required; the existing candidate data and examination centres would be used for the rescheduled exam. On 15 May, the NTA announced the re-examination would take place on 21 June 2026.

Investigators said the paper leak network had spread across Rajasthan, Maharashtra, and other states. Union Education Minister Dharmendra Pradhan admitted there was a "breach in the command chain", and announced plans to move the NEET to a computer-based exam format the following year.

== Investigation and arrests ==
In Rajasthan, the Special Operations Group initiated an investigation after identifying 42 out of 45 questions from a mock paper traced to a coaching institute in Latur that appeared on the actual test. After tracing the paper, Shubham Khairnar was arrested in Nashik, Maharashtra; he had acquired the papers from a primary source and distributed them to students for ₹15 lakh (US$16,000).

On 12 May 2026, the Central Bureau of Investigation (CBI) officially took over the investigation, and announced the arrest of several individuals, including Pune-based chemistry professor P. V. Kulkarni, who was accused to have links to NTA processes, and biology professor Manisha Gurunath Mandhare. Kulkarni had access to the question papers through his work on behalf of the NTA as a translator. He allegedly ran special classes where exam questions were dictated along with their correct answers. Handwritten notes by students who attended these classes were also found to match the actual exam. During raids, officials recovered electronic devices and notes in connection with the leaks.

CBI investigators found evidence that the NEET UG 2025 question paper was also compromised by the same racket responsible for the 2026 leak.

On 18 May 2026, the CBI arrested Shivraj Motegaonkar, owner of Renukai Chemistry Classes Coaching Institute in Latur, Maharashtra, in connection with the paper leak. The investigation agency told a New Delhi court that Motegaonkar had received the chemistry questions on 23 April 2026. Later, he was also seen in a video where he claimed the mock questions given to his students would be featured in the actual exam. Question banks, documents, mobile phone and laptops were confiscated from his residence and institute for further analysis. He was held in CBI custody for nine days.

The CBI carried out further probes at the residences of candidates who allegedly received the leaked papers at two locations in Nagpur. They were believed to be in contact with Manisha Waghmare, a beauty parlour owner, who was arrested earlier in Pune. The agency suspected the students were called to Pune a day before the exam where the questions were discussed in a private session. However, no arrests were made after this investigation.

Manisha Sanjay Havaldar, the headmistress of a Pune-based school, was arrested by the CBI on 22 May 2026 for supposedly leaking the physics question paper, which later appeared in the actual exam. She had access to these questions through her appointment as a subject expert by the NTA. Havaldar confessed to the investigators that she had recalled the physics questions from memory and shared them with a student. These were further circulated over a messaging app at the request of Mandhare. During a raid on Havaldar's home in Pune, CBI recovered several NEET UG question papers, NTA identity card copies and cash among other material. Havaldar also admitted she used the school computer to print the leaked material and then erased the chat history with Mandhare and burned her handwritten notes. The student who obtained the physics questions from Havaldar was arrested on 26 May 2026.

The CBI later clarified the supposed student was in fact a physics teacher, Tejas Harshadkumar Shah, who was associated with the Dr. Abhang Prabhu Medical Academy in Pune. Manoj Shirure, a pediatrician from Latur, was also arrested by the CBI. Shirure was suspected to be among the group of doctors who had paid money to procure leaked papers for their relatives. The CBI probe revealed financial transactions and WhatsApp chats between Shah and Havaldar's husband. Shah's number was apparently saved as 'God' in Havaldar's device. Shah had received the leaked questions from Havaldar and shared them with Motegaonkar, who eventually passed them on to Shirure. The agency further added that Shirure and Kulkarni allegedly conducted special coaching sessions for students whose families paid between ₹2 lakh (US$2,100) to ₹10 lakh (US$10,000) each for the leaked questions.

== Reactions ==
The cancellation led to large protests by students and parents in Delhi and other cities, including by members of the National Students' Union of India at Shastri Bhawan in Delhi. Protestors demanded accountability and called for the resignation of NTA officials. Many student groups said the repeated disruptions caused stress, anxiety, and a loss of motivation. According to The Indian Express at least 12 students took their own lives after news of the leaks became public.

Former Chief Minister MK Stalin urged the central government to exempt the NEET-UG for the 2026 school year and allow states to determine their own medical admission process. He criticized the NEET, arguing it has transformed medical admissions into a highly commercialized and coaching-centre-driven system in which economic privilege increasingly influences success rather than academic merit or social commitment. Political leaders, including Tamil Nadu Chief Minister C Joseph Vijay, called for the NEET to be abolished. The Leader of the Opposition, Rahul Gandhi, criticized the government's handling of the exam, describing the leak as a "crime" against the youth's future and comparing the examination process to an auction. Reacting to Gandhi's criticism, the Bharatiya Janata Party's spokesperson Sanjay Mayukh described the comments as "extremely unfortunate [and] insensitive", and accused the Congress of engaging in "politics of confusion and first introspect" over the matter.

Medical organizations such as the Federation of All India Medical Associations filed petitions in the Supreme Court, asking for reforms within the NTA and a court-monitored re-examination. Education experts also criticized the re-exam, saying it was unfair to honest students and exposed major problems in the way the exam system was being managed.

On 25 May 2026, the Supreme Court of India sought a status report on the implementation of recommendations made by the committee constituted after its 2024 ruling on the NEET-UG paper leak issue that year.

== Protests ==
=== Jantar Mantar demonstrations ===
On 6 June 2026, the Cockroach Janta Party (CJP), founded by digital strategist Abhijeet Dipke, launched physical demonstrations at Jantar Mantar, New Delhi. The youth-led movement demanded the immediate resignation of Union Education Minister Dharmendra Pradhan over systemic failures, alleged paper leaks during the 2026 NEET-UG examination, and technical glitches in the Central Board of Secondary Education's (CBSE) On-Screen Marking system.

On 28 June 2026, environmentalist and education reformer Sonam Wangchuk joined the CJP-led agitation at Jantar Mantar and began an indefinite hunger strike alongside student activists from the All India Students' Association (AISA). Wangchuk and the student leaders demanded a comprehensive, independent judicial inquiry into the National Testing Agency (NTA) and structural reforms across national examination bodies.

As the hunger strike reached its 21st day on 18 July 2026, Delhi Police forcibly removed a severely weakened Wangchuk from the protest stage and admitted him to VMMC & Safdarjung Hospital under directions from the Delhi High Court citing critical health concerns. The removal triggered immediate outrage among protesters, prompting CJP founder Dipke to launch an indefinite fast-unto-death in response.

=== Sansad Chalo march ===
On 20 July 2026, coinciding with the commencement of Parliament's Monsoon Session, CJP organised a "Sansad Chalo" (March to Parliament) rally. An estimated crowd of over 10,000 students and activists assembled near Jantar Mantar. Security forces attempted to disperse the crowd using tear gas, water cannons, and a lathi (baton) charge after marchers breached initial barricades near Constitution Club. Dozens of protesters and police personnel sustained injuries during the clashes.

Later that day, a delegation of CJP spokespersons, including Saurav Das and Ashutosh Ranka, met with Union Minister JP Nadda at his residence to formally submit a five-point petition. Their demands included the resignation of Union Education Minister Dharmendra Pradhan, an immediate judicial probe into testing irregularities, compensation for families of affected students, and the release of detained protesters.

=== Resignation of Dharmendra Pradhan ===
On 25 July 2026, due to mounting pressure and demands from the protestors, Pradhan resigned as Education Minister and was replaced with BJP MP and Union Minister Prahlad Joshi.

== Retest ==
The paper setters, translators, moderators and other team members linked to the retest scheduled on 21 June 2026 were secured at an undisclosed location. Usage of digital devices was restricted, and only authorized personnel were allowed inside the facility. All the associated people were kept under supervision until the end of the examination to avoid any contact with external sources. Security was raised at each and every step - from paper development to final transportation. After the suggestion from a previous high-level meeting chaired by the defence minister Rajnath Singh, it was confirmed Indian Air Force aircraft would transport the question papers to various sub-locations and then send them to examination centers for the retest.

While downloading the admit cards for the retest, several candidates reported technical glitches in the official portal and also sought clarification regarding the fee refund procedure. The flagged issues were acknowledged by the NTA, who assured quick resolution by the concerned teams. Further, the agency added the refund would be directly credited to the bank details shared on the official portal and advised students to beware of fraudulent messages circulating online related to this process.

The NTA worked with relevant authorities to monitor social media and messaging platforms for suspicious activity and flag fake information related to the re-examination. As part of this undertaking, the cyber-crime cell of Ahmedabad City Police arrested two people from Rajasthan who allegedly operated channels on the instant messaging service Telegram that promised NEET re-exam questions and demanded money in exchange. However, no actual evidence of the paper was found with them. On 16 June 2026, the Ministry of Electronics and Information Technology issued a directive to temporarily block Telegram across India until 22 June 2026 to prevent the spread of any unwanted data regarding the retest. The ministry also instructed Telegram to block the message editing feature until 30 June 2026 to restrict its misuse. This move was welcomed by the NTA who further added that they regretted the inconvenience caused to the general public who used the platform for genuine purposes. Telegram challenged this decision in the Delhi High Court, but the court upheld the order.

The results of the retest were declared on 16 July 2026. 110,000 candidates qualified in the examination with women accounting for more than 58% of the total number of qualified candidates. Over 270,000 candidates skipped the retest, bringing down the attendance from 96.72% to 87.72%, the second-lowest attendance recorded for the examination since 2020.

== Anti-cheating amendments ==
The government plans to amend the Public Examinations (Prevention of Unfair Means) Act, 2024 to introduce fast track courts for paper leak cases and increase the maximum jail term beyond the current 10 years. Existing provisions include up to 10 years imprisonment and a ₹1 crore (US$100,000) fine for offenders.

== See also ==
- National Testing Agency controversies
- Medical College Admission Test
- Professional and Linguistic Assessments Board
- Varsity Blues scandal, 2019 U.S. criminal prosecution of cheating on college entrance exam
