= National Testing Agency controversies =

Indian ministry controversies

The National Testing Agency (NTA) is an autonomous body under Department of Higher Education of the Ministry of Education of India. It has often been in controversy, multiple news reports including The Times of India, India Today, Scroll.in have reported that the agency has faced issues such as paper leaks, unfair grace marks, and technical or administrative problems at exam centres. Critics have also questioned how the NTA is managed, saying it lacks transparency and public accountability. Because of these problems, many court cases have been filed against it, and the government has announced reviews and possible reforms to improve its functioning.

== JEE (Main) ==
=== JEE (Main) 2020 Assam topper scam ===
In 2020, Neel Nakshatra Das, a candidate for JEE Main used a substitute to appear for the exam. He subsequently scored 99.8 percentile in the exam and ranked first in his state, Assam. Seven people have been arrested, including Bhargav Deka, the owner of a city-based coaching institute, Global Edu Light and Tata Consultancy Services employees The candidate (Neel Nakshatra Das), Neel's father, Jyotirmoy Das, and an invigilator.

=== JEE (Main) 2022 technical glitches ===
The National Testing Agency was widely criticised for the improper conduction of the JEE (Main) 2022 examination. Many students faced technical glitches during the examination, which resulted in lower scores. Glitches in answer key and response sheet of the exam were also a serious problem for the students. The agency has not considered the re-conduction of the examination.

=== Apparent misconduct and irregularity in JEE (Main) 2024 ===
The NTA has been criticised for irregularities in the difficulty level of question papers of JEE(Main), which leads to the normalisation of marks and ultimately, lower scores of candidates.

==== JEE (Main) 2024 Session 1 (January) ====
The discrepancy of appearing students in the initial four shifts of January 27(Shift 1 and 2) and January 29(Shift 1 and 2) has been reported by many students. The NTA allegedly distributed candidates erratically over the 10 shifts. Claims state that an absurdly larger appearance of students on the first two days was observed which caused major disparities in percentiles of the candidates. A surge in cutoff was also observed which further caused despair among some students. Multiple requests under the RTI Act have been filed, seeking evidence-backed statistical records of the number of students appearing in the respective shifts. However, the NTA released the data in which no uneven distribution of candidates was found.

==== JEE (Main) 2024 Session 2 (April) ====
The agency stated that one case of impersonation and nine cases of cheating or other unfair means were reported on 4 April. It was later reported that the impersonation case was reported in Noida, while the other nine cases were reported in various parts of the country. The offenders were detected through artificial intelligence enabled monitoring and biometric verification. In its concluding press release, the agency highlighted that 39 candidates have been disqualified for a period of three years due to their involvement in unfair practices during the examination.

=== Controversy in the final results of JEE (Main) 2025 ===
Following the release of the JEE Main 2025 Session 2 results by the National Testing Agency (NTA), concerns were raised by students and educators regarding discrepancies in the NTA percentile scores. Several students reported a mismatch between their raw scores and the percentiles allotted, with instances where candidates with lower scores received higher percentiles, while those with higher raw scores were awarded comparatively lower percentiles.

This anomaly sparked confusion and dissatisfaction, particularly among students who narrowly missed the eligibility cutoff for JEE Advanced 2025 due to their reported percentiles. Many candidates took to social media platforms to share their experiences, and the issue gained wider attention after it was first highlighted by a YouTuber in his video and in the comments section, who analyzed and compared scorecards submitted by affected students.

As the issue gained traction, demands for clarification from the "NTA" increased, with some students urging a review or reevaluation of the percentile normalization process used for multi-shift exams. At the time, the NTA had not issued a formal statement addressing the specific mismatches reported in Session 2.

=== Confusion over calculator use in the Information Bulletin of JEE (Main) 2026 ===
In the first version of the Information Bulletin (uploaded on 31 October 2025) for the Joint Entrance Examination (Main) 2026, the National Testing Agency (NTA) mentioned that an onscreen standard calculator would be available during the computer-based test. On 2 November, the NTA issued a clarification stating that the mention of the calculator was a typographic error and that no calculator, either onscreen or physical, will be allowed in the examination. The corrected version of the Information Bulletin was later uploaded on the official website for candidates to download.

Many aspirants and coaching institutes remarked that the inclusion of a calculator in the original bulletin would have significantly impacted preparation strategies for the high-numerical-weight sections of the exam. After the retraction, several institutes urged students to revert to strong manual calculation skills and practice without expecting electronic aids. The sudden change triggered widespread discussion on social media and exam-prep platforms until the corrected bulletin was uploaded.

== NEET (UG) ==
=== NEET (UG) 2020 discrepancies ===
In the NEET (UG) 2020 exam, the NTA incorrectly declared that Vidhi Suryavanshi of Madhya Pradesh's Chhindwara district had only scored 6 marks which were later found out to be false after Vidhi committed suicide. Vidhi's response sheet proved that she had actually scored 590 marks.

In the NEET (UG) 2020 exam, the NTA had allegedly declared Mridul Rawat as failed. Rawat claimed that he challenged the NTA and after rechecking his OMR sheet and Answer Key, it was found that he was an All India Topper (ST Category). Rawat also claimed that even after the rechecking, in the revised scorecard, his score was 650 but only three hundred twenty-nine were written in words. The NTA refuted the claims of Mridul Rawat. Director-General Vineet Joshi of the NTA said, “An aspirant has claimed that he has 650 marks whereas he has obtained 329 marks in the NEET 2020 results. The emails purported to have been written by the NTA are also fake. This news has been broadcast by some local news channels in some cities. It was totally fake, fabricated, and one-sided and news channels should have confirmed from NTA prior to broadcasting it. In the instant case, a complaint was being filed by the NTA with the cybersecurity cell under the IT Act at Noida, UP.”

=== 2024 NEET-UG controversy ===
In NEET (UG) 2024 exam, for which a little more than 24 lakh registered, the paper was leaked on 5 May 2024 in Patna, Bihar. According to the police, the paper leak mafia allegedly took ₹30 lakhs to ₹50 lakhs from many candidates and accommodated them in the lodges of Patna where they were provided question papers, claiming to be that of NEET-UG, for memorizing.

On 4 June 2024, the NEET-UG result was suddenly declared on the same day as the result of the 2024 Indian general election, 10 days before the expected result date, declared by the NTA. Publicly published results of various all-India top scorers who scored 718 and 719 marks went viral on the Internet. Many students and teachers pointed out that due to the structure of the marking scheme, it was impossible to obtain those marks in the NEET-UG examinations.

The number of candidates scoring full marks also went up from 2 in 2023 to 67 in 2024 From a merit list uploaded into the public database by the NTA, it was also revealed that of those 67, scoring 720 out of 720 marks, six took the exam from the same or nearby centres in the Jhajjar city of Haryana.

When students raised their concerns, the NTA released a statement to explain the discrepancies: "(The) NTA received few representations and Court Cases from the candidates of (the) NEET (UG) 2024, raising concerns of loss of time during the conduct of the examination on 5 May 2024. Such cases/representations were considered by (the) NTA and the normalisation formula, which has been devised and adopted by the Hon'ble Apex Court, vide its judgment dated 13th June 2018, was implemented to address the loss of time faced by the candidates of (the) NEET (UG) 2024."

The NTA noted that around 1,563 candidates were given grace marks, and the revised marks of such candidates vary from 20 to 720 marks. Students raised concerns over not being notified of the grace mark formulation in the examination brochures and the criteria for allotment of these grace marks. However, after the intervention of the Supreme Court, the NTA decided to withdraw the grace marks and hold the examination again for those 1,563 candidates on 23 June 2024. Out of these, 813 students took the retest.

The National Testing Agency (NTA), entrusted with organizing NEET (UG) 2024, has taken significant steps to address such challenges. These measures include deploying advanced security technologies, increasing CCTV coverage, and enforcing stricter protocols for invigilators to ensure a fair and transparent examination environment.

As per the recommendations of the High Powered Committee, NTA decided to reconduct the NEET (UG) 2024 on 23 June 2024 for 1563 candidates who had experienced time loss during the originally scheduled examination on 5 May 2024 and were awarded compensatory marks.

On July 23, 2024, the Supreme Court of India led by Justice DY Chandrachud and consisting of Justices JB Pardiwala and Manoj Misra acknowledged that at least 155 students directly benefitted from the paper leak ruled that there were no indications of an overall systemic failure barring few circumstances and denied that there was any large-scale leak of the NEET(UG) 2024 paper hence ruled that there would be no re-examination as there were no credible reports of a large-scale phenomenon.

=== 2026 NEET UG Leak ===
In May 2026, a controversy emerged regarding the NEET (UG) exam held on May 3. The Rajasthan Special Operations Group (SOG) started an investigation after a "guess paper" circulated in Sikar was found to be very similar to the actual exam. The investigation began after repeated complaints to the NTA and CBI by Shashikant Suthar, a chemistry teacher. Shashikant noticed a PDF being forwarded on phones in the guise of a "guess paper", but after analyzing it he realized the questions, sequence of options, etc matched the official question paper. Over the next few days he continued gathering evidence and similar leaked papers and sent detailed emails to the NTA. According to reports, questions worth nearly 600 out of 720 marks matched the circulated material, mostly in Chemistry and Biology sections. While investigations are ongoing, the National Testing Agency (NTA) stated they are looking into these claims of paper leak and malpractice.

On May 12, the paper was cancelled following allegations of the 'guess paper' leak. The exam will be now be re-conducted on a later date. The issue has been formally turned over to the Central Bureau of Investigation for a thorough investigation. Investigators are currently looking into two potential leak routes, one involving the paper setter and the other during the printing step.. However, the 2024 CBI probe could not prevent this recurrence (of much higher scale) within two years. The cancellation triggered protests by student organizations, including the National Students' Union of India (NSUI), in Delhi, with demands for accountability over preparation costs, uncertainty, and repeated systemic issues.

== UGC-NET ==
=== 2026 UGC-NET examination ===
On August 16, 2026, NTA announced that the UGC–NET examinations for English, Sociology and Commerce would be re-conducted, following several complaints on multiple errors in the papers. After a committee was formed to enquire into the incident, it was found that these papers had "many factual, typographical, translation errors including misspelt names of prominent scholars, garbled book titles, errors in the stem wording of questions, grammatical errors, gender and number agreement errors, punctuation mistakes, and non-standard coined terms for established concepts, as well as repetition of a significant number of questions previously administered."

== See also ==
- National Testing Agency
- NCERT textbook controversies
- 2024 NEET controversy
- 2026 NEET controversy
- Education in India
- Ministry of Education (India)
