= National Council for Vocational Education and Training =

Indian regulatory body

National Council for Vocational Education and Training is an autonomous, non-statutory and regulatory body under Ministry of Skill Development and Entrepreneurship for monitoring the institutions engaged in providing short term and long term educational training in vocational education and designing the basic standards required for operations of such institutions. The chairman and two executive and non executive members will be appointed by a committee consisting of Prime Minister of India, home minister, finance minister, agriculture minister and minister for rural development who are part of Cabinet Committee on Employment and Skill Development. The National Council for Vocational Education and Training will be controlling authority of institutions imparting education and training to 15 million students each year.

== History and Objective ==
National Council for Vocational Education and Training was formed on 10 October 2018 by clubbing National Council for Vocational Training (NCVT) and National Skills Development Agency (NSDA), as non-statutory and regulatory institution for designing basic guidelines for working of institutions engaged in providing short term and long term vocational education and training. The institutions under National Council for Vocational Education and Training impart vocational education to 15 million students every year.

== Composition ==
National Council for Vocational Education and Training to consist of a chairperson and two executive members and two non-executive members who will be appointed by a committee headed by Prime Minister. The council will also have a nominated member and designated staff with officers and consultants.

== See also ==
- Industrial Training Institute
- National Skill Development Corporation
- Beauty & Wellness Sector Skill Council
