= National Testing Agency =

Indian government agency

Displacement overview
- Formed: November 2017 (8 years ago)
- Type: For conducting entrance examinations.
- Jurisdiction: India
- Status: Active
- Headquarters: 5th Floor, Government of India Press Building Minto Road, New Delhi 110002, India
- Displacement executives: Abhishek Singh, Director General; Pawan Kumar Sharma, Director; Vijaykumar Vinayakrao Patil, Director; Ashish Gupta, Joint Director
- Website: nta.ac.in

The National Testing Agency (NTA) is an autonomous body under Department of Higher Education of the Ministry of Education of India. It was established in November 2017 to conduct entrance examinations, admissions and recruitment. As of 2025, it no longer conducts recruitment examinations. The agency is responsible for conducting numerous national-level exams for admission and fellowship in higher educational institutions related to engineering, medicine, management, research and pharmacy.

The agency has been the subject of multiple controversies. Multiple news reports have said that the agency has faced issues such as paper leaks, unfair grace marks and technical or administrative problems at exam centres. Critics have also questioned the NTA's management, saying it lacks transparency and public accountability. Because of these problems, many court cases have been filed against it, and the government has announced reviews and possible reforms to improve its functioning.

== History ==
The roots of the agency can be traced to the Programme of Action 1992, related to the National Policy of Education 1986, which mentioned conducting national-level common entrance tests to professional and non-professional programmes of study. Its actual start was in 2010 with a report submitted to the Ministry of Human Resources Development (MHRD) (now the Ministry of Education) by a committee consisting of some of the directors of the Indian Institutes of Technology (IITs), which recommended that the national testing agency be "created by an Act of Parliament". The report mentioned that a statutory agency can ensure independence and transparency in the testing of the magnitude that was being envisaged.

In 2013, the MHRD constituted a seven-member task force to "prepare a blueprint for creating a special purpose vehicle to take the concept of the National Testing Agency (NTA) forward". This follows a decision made in April 2013 to set up the agency.

In 2017, an announcement about the NTA was made by the Finance Minister in the budget speech of 2017, and this was followed by Cabinet approval. The government appointed Vineet Joshi as the first Director-General of the agency.

On 7 July 2018, the former Union HRD Minister Prakash Javadekar stated, during a press conference, that the NTA will be holding the Joint Entrance Examination–Main (JEE Main) and the National Eligibility cum Entrance Test-Undergraduate (NEET-UG) twice a year, and will also be holding the National Eligibility Test (NET), the Common Management Admission Test (CMAT) and the Graduate Pharmacy Aptitude Test (GPAT).

In December 2024, Dharmendra Pradhan (Union Education Minister) announced that from 2025 onward it will only conduct entrance exams for higher-education institutions and will stop organising recruitment tests. The decision follows a high-level committee’s recommendation and aims to restore trust in the exam system after recurring issues such as alleged paper leaks and administrative glitches.

== Administration ==
The agency is administered by a governing body which includes a chairperson, a secretary and eight or more officials representing different national level institutes.

As of 2026, Abhishek Singh is appointed as Director General whereas Pawan Kumar Sharma and Vijaykumar Vinayakrao Patil are appointed as Directors. Ashish Gupta takes charge as Joint Director (Deputy Secretary level) in the National Testing Agency under the Department of Higher Education, Delhi.

=== Budget ===
The Union Cabinet has granted an initial amount of ₹25 crore (equivalent to ₹38 crore or US$4.0 million in 2026) to the NTA to start its operations in the first year. The agency is financed by the Department of Higher Education of the Ministry of Education.

== Exams ==
Following are the exams conducted by the NTA every year.

=== For universities and colleges ===
- Joint Entrance Examination (Main) (JEE-Main)
- National Eligibility cum Entrance Test (Undergraduate) (NEET-UG)
- Common Management Admission Test (CMAT)
- Common University Entrance Test (CUET)
- Indian Council of Agricultural Research Entrance Examination (only PG and PhD)
- National Council for Hotel Management Joint Entrance Examination (NCHMJEE)
- National Institute of Fashion Technology Entrance Examination
- All India Ayush Post Graduate Entrance Test (AIAPGET)
- Joint Integrated Programme in Management Admission Test (JIPMAT)
- Graduate Aptitude Test – Biotechnology (GAT-B)
- Biotechnology Eligibility Test (BET)
- National Common Entrance Test (NCET)
- National Forensic Admission Test (NFAT)
- National Institute of Technology Master of Computer Applications Common Entrance Test(NIMCET)

=== For Schools ===
- Scheme for Residential Education for Students in High Classes in Targeted Areas (SRESHTA)
- Navyug School Sarojini Nagar Entrance Test (NSSNET)
- All India Sainik Schools Entrance Exam (AISSEE)

== Controversies ==
The National Testing Agency (NTA) has faced repeated controversies over exam integrity, technical errors, and transparency. Major national exams like NEET-UG, JEE Main, and CUET-UG have seen allegations of paper leaks, technical glitches, and irregularities in question papers and results. The agency has also been criticized for awarding grace marks, sudden changes in scorecards, and frequent legal disputes from aggrieved candidates.

== See also ==
- National Testing Agency controversies
- National Council of Educational Research and Training
- NCERT textbook controversies
- Public service commissions in India
- 2026 NEET scandal
- Union Public Service Commission
