= Boston University College of Communication =

Communications school at Boston University

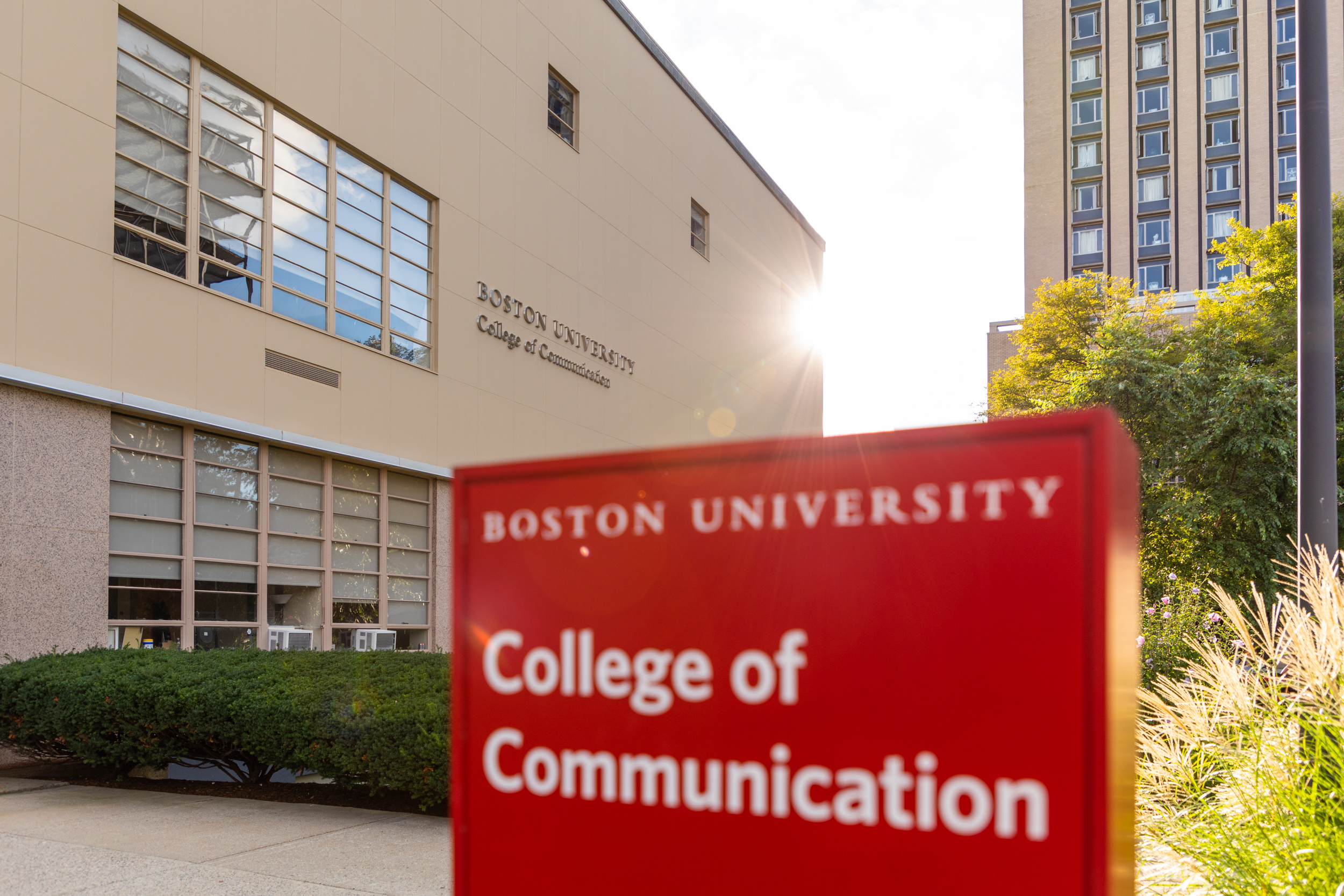
- The College of Communication
- Type: Private communication college
- Established: 1947
- Parent institution: Boston University
- Dean: Mariette DiChristina
- Students: 2,635
- Undergraduates: 2,105
- Postgraduates: 520
- Doctoral students: 10
- Location: Boston, Massachusetts, United States
- Campus: Urban
- Website: bu.edu/com

The Boston University College of Communication (COM) is the communication school of Boston University (BU), a private research university in Boston, Massachusetts. Founded in 1947, it was the first in the United States to offer a degree in public relations (PR). COM's AdLab is the first and largest student-run advertising agency. COM houses the university's undergraduate and graduate programs in advertising, film and television, journalism, media science, and public relations.

== Academics ==
Boston University's College of Communication comprises three academic departments: Journalism; Film and Television; and Mass Communication, Advertising and Public Relations. It also has two cross-department divisions: Emerging Media Studies and Communication. The college offers both undergraduate and graduate degrees.

=== Degree Programs ===
Boston University's College of Communication offers five Bachelor of Science undergraduate degree programs: Advertising, Film and Television, Journalism, Media Science and Public Relations. It offers 13 graduate degree programs: Advertising (Master of Science), Emerging Media Studies (Master of Arts and PhD), Television (MS), Film and Television Studies (Master of Fine Arts), Screenwriting (MFA), Media Ventures (MS), Journalism (MS), Media Science (MS), Media Science: Marketing Communication Research (MS), Public Relations (MS), Strategic Integrated Communication (MS), and Human Centered Design (MS). It offers a combined BS/MS program in Branded Content Production and a certificate program in Civic Science Communication.

=== Accolades ===
Boston University's College of Communication is well regarded among communication colleges in the United States, listed on the Public Relations Education A-List by PR News and among Top Film Schools by Variety, and ranked by industry sources:

| Rank | Program | Source | Year |
|---|---|---|---|
| 1 | Best Schools for Public Relations & Advertising | College Factual | 2025 |
| 2 | Best Journalism Schools | College Factual | 2025 |
| 3 | Best Colleges for Advertising | College Transitions | 2025 |
| 3 | Best Colleges for Journalism | College Transitions | 2025 |
| 4 | Best Colleges for Communications | College Transitions | 2025 |
| 14 | Top Film Schools | The Wrap | 2025 |
| 16 | Best Film Schools | The Hollywood Reporter | 2025 |

== Notable alumni ==
- Chet Simmons (1952) – first ESPN president, ABC Sports executive, NBC Sports president, USFL commissioner, Sports Broadcasting Hall of Fame in 2010, helped build ABC Sports into a leader in sports programming, developed Wide World of Sports
- Jean Firstenberg (1958) – President and CEO of the American Film Institute (1980–2007), only woman to serve
- Donald Lambro (1962) – chief political correspondent of The Washington Times
- Nina Totenberg* – correspondent for National Public Radio, one of NPR's "Founding Mothers"
- David Doubilet (1970) – National Geographic photographer
- Joe Roth (1971) – Chairman, Walt Disney Studios (1994–2000); Chairman, 20th Century Fox (1989–1993), Caravan Pictures (1993–1994), and founder of major American film studio, Morgan Creek Entertainment
- Bonnie Hammer (1971), Chairman, NBCUniversal
- Lauren Shuler Donner (1971) – X-Men film series franchise producer, films have grossed around $5.5 billion
- Carmen Fields (1973) – Emmy-winning journalist, Channel 7
- Joseph Nocera (1974) Pulitzer Prize for Commentary finalist, columnist, New York Times
- Joan Vennochi (1975) – Pulitzer Prize-winning journalist at The Boston Globe, 1980 Pulitzer Prize for Investigative Reporting
- Mark Thompson (1975) – Pulitzer Prize-winning journalist at Fort Worth Star-Telegram, 1985 Pulitzer Prize for Public Service
- Howard Stern (1976) – host of The Howard Stern Show
- Ted Harbert (1977), Chairman, NBC Broadcasting, President and CEO of the Comcast Entertainment Group, and Chairman of ABC Entertainment
- Bonnie Arnold (1978) – Academy Award-nominated producer, prominent figure in initial wave of computer-animation, producer of Toy Story, Tarzan, and How to Train Your Dragon
- Jim Donovan (1978), news anchor, play-by-play announcer for NBC Sports's NFL coverage (1987–1997), radio voice of the Cleveland Browns Radio Network since 1999
- Michael Williams (1979) – Academy Award and Emmy Award-winning producer, Queer Eye for the Straight Guy, Queer Eye
- Brian Bedol (1980) – creator of ESPN Classic, founder and CEO, CBS Sports Network
- Deborah Liebling (1981) – Emmy Award-nominated producer, President of Production at Universal Pictures, responsible for South Park
- Kevin Burns (1981) – Emmy Award-winning producer of A&E's Biography series, also Ancient Aliens, America's Book of Secrets
- Anthony Radziwill (1982) Emmy Award-winning NBC anchor and reporter, Peabody Award for an investigation on the resurgence of Nazism in the United States, son of Caroline Lee Bouvier Canfield, nephew of First Lady Jacqueline Kennedy, spouse of Carole Radziwiłł
- Richard Gladstein (1983) – Academy Award-nominated producer, Pulp Fiction, She's All That, The Bourne Identity
- Scott Rosenberg (1985) – writer, producer, Con Air, Gone in 60 Seconds, Beautiful Girls, High Fidelity
- Joseph Hallinan (1984) – Pulitzer Prize-winning journalist at The Indianapolis Star, 1991 Pulitzer Prize for Investigative Reporting
- Don Van Natta Jr. (1986) – Pulitzer Prize-winning journalist at The New York Times and The Miami Herald, 1993 Pulitzer Prize for Public Service, 1999 Pulitzer Prize for National Reporting and 2002 Pulitzer Prize for Explanatory Reporting
- Andy Cohen (1990) – Primetime Emmy Award and Peabody Award-winning host, executive producer of the Real Housewives franchise
- Nancy Dubuc (1991), CEO, Vice Media, CEO and President, A+E Networks
- Tyler Hicks (1993) – Pulitzer Prize-winning journalist for The New York Times, two-time winner of the Pulitzer Prize for Breaking News Photography, Pulitzer Prize for International Reporting
- Bill Simmons (1993) – ESPN columnist, CEO of the sports and pop culture website The Ringer, The Bill Simmons Podcast
- Hong Chau (2001) – Academy Award-nominated actress, Best Supporting Actress for The Whale, starred in Netflix's The Menu, Wes Anderson's Asteroid City, A24's Showing Up, Ngoc Lan Tran in Downsizing, Netflix's The Night Agent
- Nora Grossman (2005) – Academy Award-nominated producer, Best Picture for The Imitation Game
- Josh Safdie (2007) – co-director of A24's Uncut Gems, Palme d'Or-nominee Good Time, Heaven Knows What
- Benjamin Safdie (2008) – co-director of A24's Uncut Gems, Palme d'Or-nominee Good Time, Heaven Knows What, starred in Licorice Pizza, Are You There God? It's Me, Margaret., actor in Oppenheimer
- Abhijeet Dipke- Founder of the satirical Cockroach Janta Party, which has led protests in India in 2026

*no degree
