= Ajinkya =

Ajinkya is a given name. Notable people with the name include:

- Ajinkya Deo (born 1964), Indian actor
- Ajinkya Joshi (born 1986), Indian cricketer
- Ajinkya Rahane (born 1988), former Indian cricketer
- Ajinkya Shinde, Indian political organiser
