= Sansad Chalo march =

2026 Indian protest led by Cockroach Janta Party

- Part of 2026 Delhi Jantar Mantar Protests
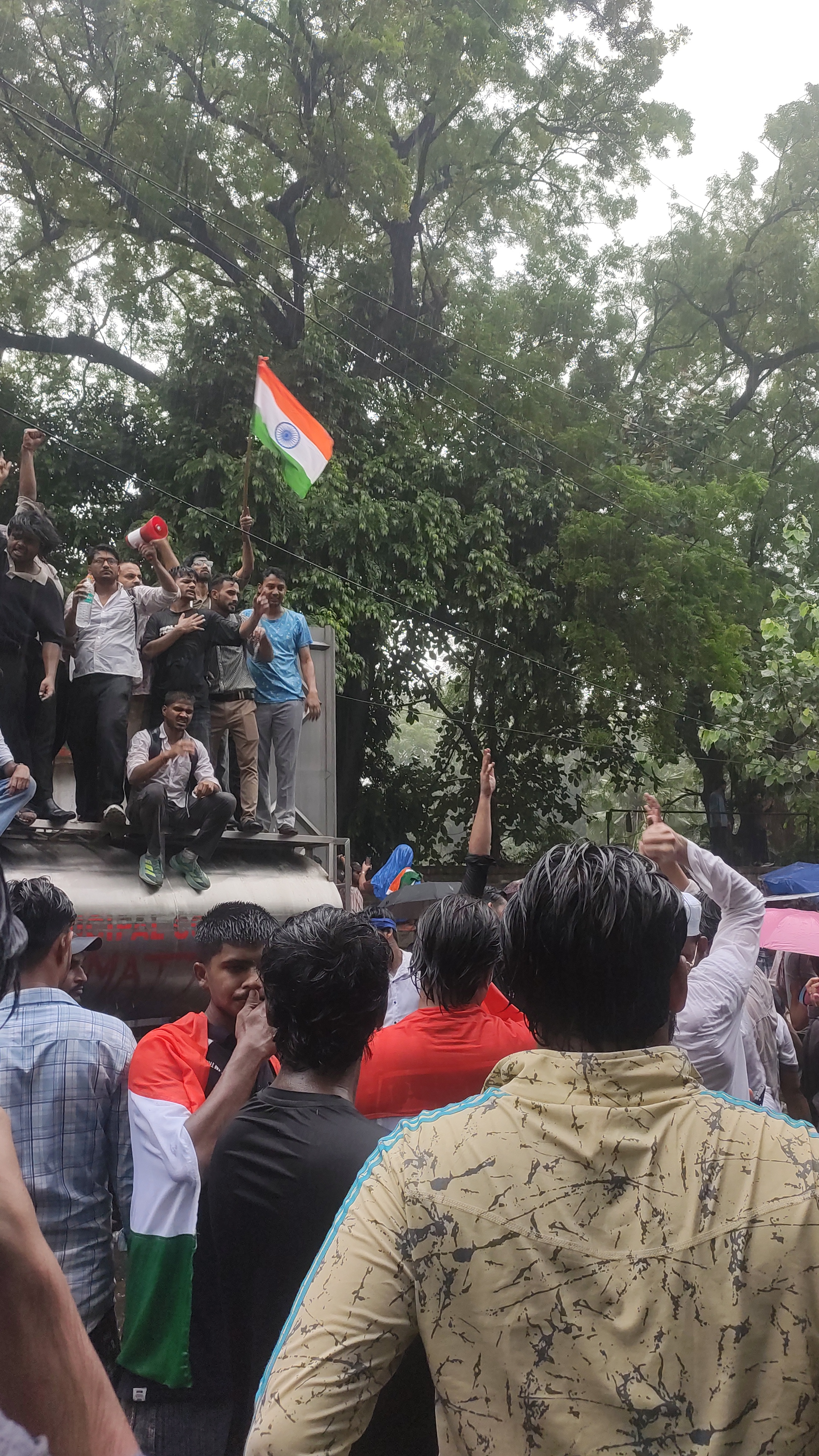
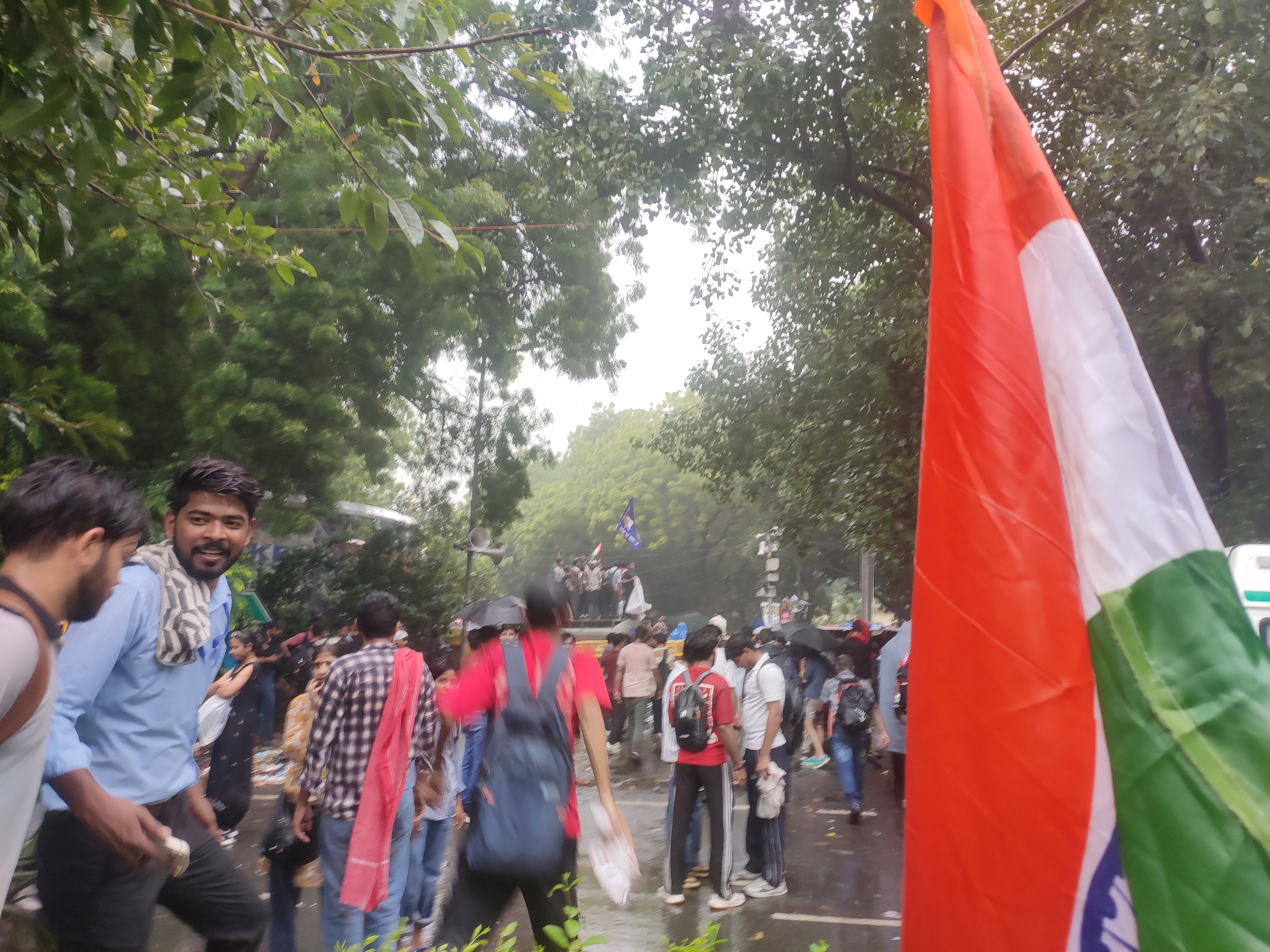
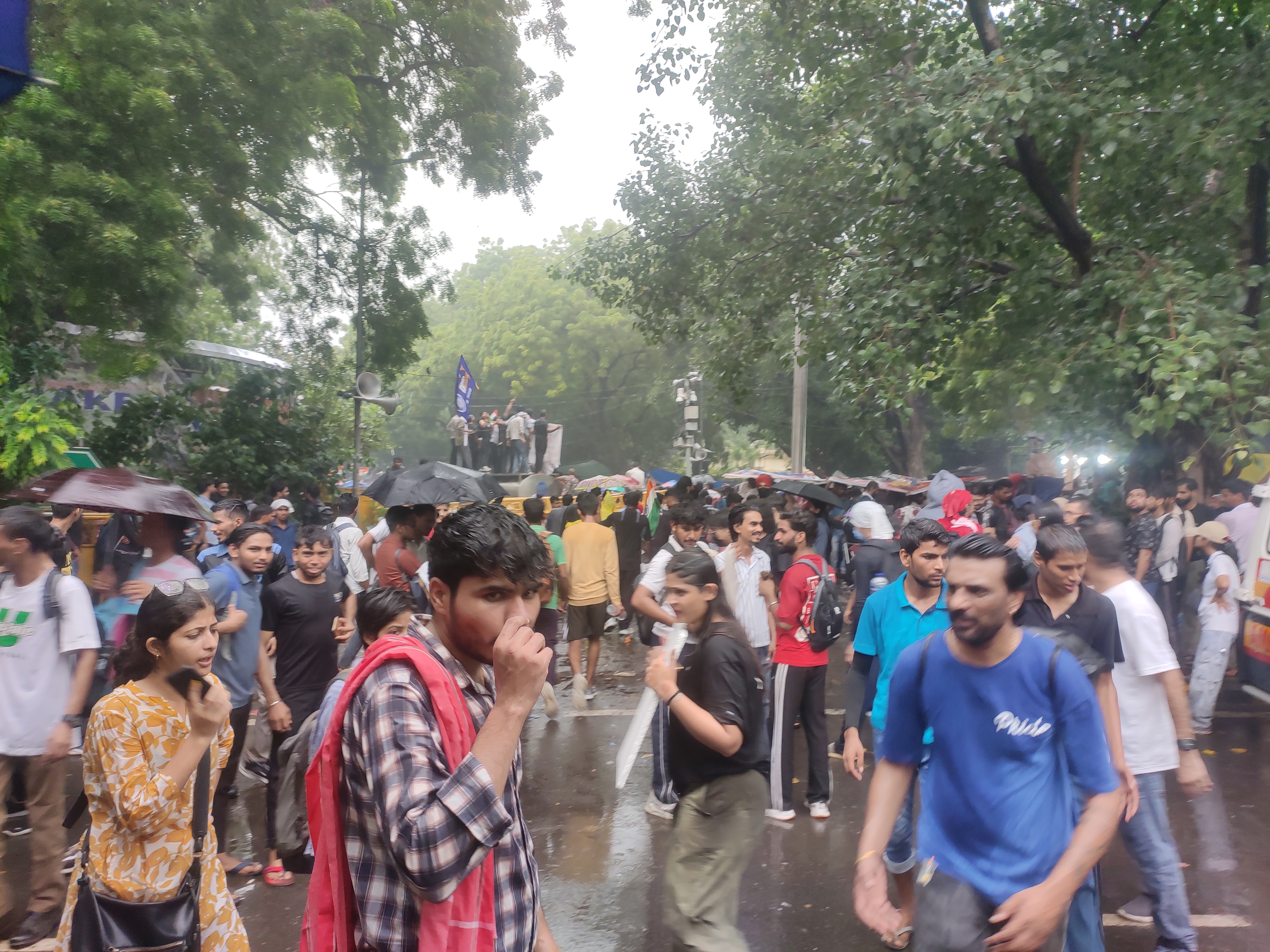
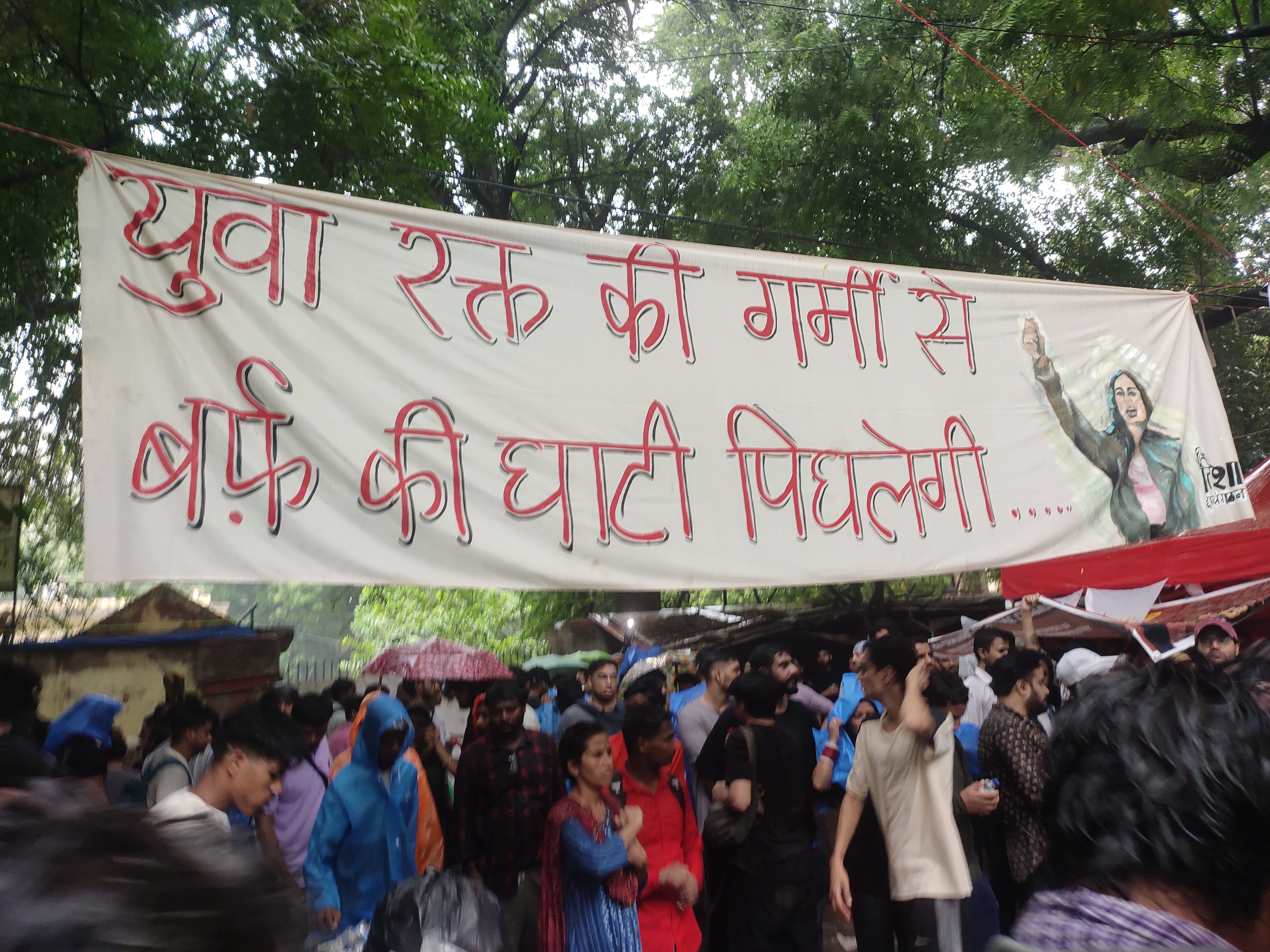
- Date: 20 July 2026
- Venue: Parliament House, New Delhi
- Location: New Delhi, India

The Sansad Chalo march (lit. 'Walk to Parliament march') was a political march organised by the Indian youth movement Cockroach Janta Party on 20 July 2026, demanding accountability for national competitive examination paper leaks and the resignation of Union Minister of Education Dharmendra Pradhan. The march originated from an ongoing sit-in at Jantar Mantar and coincided with the opening of Parliament's Monsoon Session. Despite prohibitory orders banning assemblies of five or more people in New Delhi, tens of thousands of people participated in the march towards the Parliament of India.

Police response to the march was criticized by press investigations, human rights groups, opposition politicians, and public figures as disproportionate, involving baton charges, tear gas, and pellet gun against protestors. Multiple Indian media investigations, later corroborated by fact-checkers, documented officers using nail-fitted batons and directly assaulting protestors, including women. Delhi police also alleged that some protestors pelted stones and damaged vehicles, though CJP disputed the extent and origin of this, pointing to a truck of stones near the protest site that police later confirmed had been in their custody days earlier.

The march ended on the evening of 20 July following the police response, though protestors reconvened at Jantar Mantar the following day after police dismantled the protest stage, and broader sit-in continued until Dharmendra Pradhan's resignation on 25 July 2026.

== Background ==
The Sansad Chalo March emerged from a broader protest movement led by the Cockroach Janta Party, which had been holding an indefinite sit-in at Jantar Mantar since 20 June 2026. The protests centred on the NEET-UG 2026 paper leak and the CBSE On-Screen Marking irregularities, with demonstrators calling for the resignation of Union Education Minister Dharmendra Pradhan and Prime Minister Narendra Modi.

The movement gained additional momentum on 28 June 2026 when activist Sonam Wangchuk joined the protest and began an indefinite hunger strike alongside members of the All India Students' Association (AISA). On 18 July, Delhi Police forcibly removed Wangchuk from the protest site and transported him to Safdarjung Hospital, an action CJP founder Abhijeet Dipke described as a "kidnapping." Dipke subsequently commenced his own indefinite hunger strike in protest. On 20 July — coinciding with the opening day of Parliament's Monsoon Session — Dipke ended his hunger strike following an appeal by the father of NEET aspirant Riya Thapa, who had died by suicide, so that he could lead the march to Parliament.

== March ==
The march started from Jantar Mantar in New Delhi, with participants intending to march towards the Parliament House during the opening day of the Monsoon Session of the Parliament. It was organised to press the demands following several days of sit-in protests and hunger strikes.

The Union Government issued prohibitory orders under Section 163 of the BNSS banning assemblies of five or more persons in the New Delhi district, whereas the Delhi Police deployed over 5,000 personnel and closed five Delhi Metro stations in the vicinity of Parliament. The CJP had not sought official permission for the march to Parliament.

Around 11:25 am, protesters reached Parliament Street and attempted to push through barricades and later began attacks and stone pelting. Police responded with lathi charges and fired tear gas shells at multiple locations, including Parliament Street, Patel Chowk, and Rail Bhawan. Internet services were also suspended in parts of central Delhi during the clashes.

Around 60 protesters were also injured, with 65 medico-legal cases recorded at Ram Manohar Lohia Hospital by the evening. Delhi Police initially claimed that at least 118 security personnel were injured and around 15–20 government vehicles were damaged during the clashes. As the health reports became clearer, the number of injured security personnel in the clashes was reported to be above 130. Eyewitnesses alleged that police used force "irrespective of gender". Gurdwara Bangla Sahib became a refuge for several such students and protesters fleeing batons and teargas.

CJP spokespersons Saurav Das and Ashutosh Ranka met Union Minister J.P. Nadda on the margins of the protest and raised three formal demands: the immediate release of Sonam Wangchuk, the resignation of Education Minister Dharmendra Pradhan, and financial compensation of ₹1crore to the families of NEET aspirants who died by suicide. CJP later claimed the Centre had agreed in principle to hold talks on their demands, though this was not officially confirmed by the government. On 21 July, protesters reclaimed the Jantar Mantar site after police had destroyed the stage and tents the previous day.

== Police conduct and allegations of violence ==
Following the events of 20 July, allegations of excessive use of force by Delhi Police and Rapid Action Force (RAF) against protestors became a major point of controversy, with several officers identified in viral videos and subsequent injuries documented by hospitals.

Delhi Police stated that over 118 personnel, including senior officers, sustained injuries after protestors allegedly pelted stones and other objects at them, and that around 60 protestors also reported injured during the scuffle. Delhi police also accused protestors of vandalising government vehicles during the march.

On the morning of the march, CJP founder Abhijeet Dipke posted a video on X showing a truck loaded with stones parked near Jantar Mantar, questioning whether police where "orchestrating stone pelting on the peaceful CJP protestors." The Times of India reported that CJP alleged the truck could be used to falsely implicate peaceful protesters, while Delhi Police simultaneously imposed prohibitory orders under section 163 of the Bhartiya Nagrik Suraksha Sanhita across the New Delhi district ahead of the march. CJP separately released videos on its official X account that it said showed police personnel throwing stone towards protesters, disputing the police account of the confrontation.

On 22 July, opposing a batch of PILs before a Delhi High Court division bench of Chief Justice Devendra Kumar Upadhyaya and Justice Tejas Karia, Additional Solicitor General S.V. Raju, appearing for the Union Government, submitted, "As far as the crowd is concerned, there are videos which show that the crowd was indulging in stone throwing... there was a truck lying there with stones and bricks at the place of incident... there were elements in the mob which might have restored to this."

A Newslaundry investigation published on 28 July traced the truck's registration number and found it had been seized by police 4 days earlier on 16 July, following a pre-dawn accident, and had since been in the custody of the Parliament Police Station. Delhi Police's DCP New Delhi account subsequently confirmed the truck has been seized in connection with FIR number 65/2026 over the accident and had been moved from Parliament Street in the early hours of 20 July, calling any claim of conspiracy against protestors "completely baseless." Deccan Herald noted that while police confirmed custody of the vehicle, explanation for its presence at the site varied.

According to The Indian Express, more than 100 protestors were brought to Ram Manohar Lohia Hospital following lathi-charge by the police during the march. Hospital Officials told the newspaper that many of the injured required stitches, tetanus injections and wound dressing, with most injuries affecting the head and limbs. The report also stated that some patients required CT scans and X-rays, a few were admitted to the ICU.

Navbharat Times reported that a Delhi Police inspector, identified as Naveen Rathi, shoved or attempted to shove a baton towards the genital area of a female protestor while she was running away. According to several news reports, Additional Deputy Commissioner of Delhi Police (North East District) Sandeep Lamba was seen in video footage slapping an unarmed female protestor across the face while she was standing alone at the side of the road. During the march, individuals dressed in plain clothes were seen carrying batons and participating in the police action against protestors. Several Delhi Police and Rapid Action Force (RAF) personnel were not wearing visible name badges.

IPS Sandeep Lamba wearing smart AI glasses during 20th July 2026 Sansad Chalo March

The Indian Express also reported that Rapid Action Force (RAF) personnel fired seven rounds from pellet gun during the CJP's Parliament march, five of which reportedly struck protestors. A report by Newslaundry identified three protestors struck by pellets, detailed below:

Pellet gun victims
Name	Age	Location	Time
Shaikh Irshad Mansoori	25	Near Palika Bazar	Around 5 PM
Outlook Journalist	28	Palika Bazar	Around 4 PM
Sahil Lochab	19	Palika Bazar	Around 3 PM

The Wire reported that videos circulated on social media appearing to show Delhi Police personnel using batons fitted with nails during the march. Delhi Police initially denied the allegations, describing the videos as misleading. However, fact- checks by Alt News and BOOM concluded that the videos were authentic and that the batons shown in the footage were fitted with protuding nails. Separately, according to a report by Dainik Bhaskar, videos appeared to show Rapid Action Force (RAF) personnel using electric shock batons against protestors, including women, during the march.

The Print reported that the Inspector General of Rapid Action Force has taken cognizance of social media videos of RAF personnel “deliberately knocking down” protesters at the Jantar Mantar, and even assaulting people disengaged from the agitation. An officer present in the meeting said “She made it clear that the gradation of force adopted for crowd control during the protest at Jantar Mantar, New Delhi, on July 20, 2026, did not align with prescribed standards or the RAF’s training protocols. She directed that every officer and personnel member must strictly adhere to the prescribed ‘Use of Force’ guidelines while making a proper assessment of the nature of the crowd and the prevailing circumstances".

Delhi police rejected the allegations regarding police brutality, stating that it had engaged in maintaining public order in a professional manner and denied reports of any state violence or detentions during the protest. In a statement posted on X, the police said that "no such incident has taken place" and urged the public "not to fall prey to any rumour/misgivings" regarding claims of violence against protestors.

Following the Delhi Police's denial of excessive police brutality against student protesters, the Supreme Court declined to urgently list a petition seeking intervention over the police brutality. During the oral mentioning of the matter, Chief Justice of India Surya Kant declined the request for an urgent hearing, stating, "Don't waste our time, and don't waste your time." When the petitioner's counsel referred to video footage showing police brutality at Jantar Mantar protest, the Chief Justice responded, "We are not interested in videos; we don't have time to watch." The matter was not granted urgent listing. A PIL alleging excessive force by the Delhi police filed in Delhi High court is listed for hearing on 11 September.

== Responses and reactions ==
The police action drew widespread criticism from several opposition leaders and MPs, including Shashi Tharoor, Rahul Gandhi, Renuka Chowdhury and Arvind Kejriwal. Rahul Gandhi tweeted a letter to Union Home Minister in which he wrote, “Our students were demanding a fair and accountable education system. Instead of being heard, security forces assaulted them with indiscriminate force, including lethal weapons and tear gas. Hundreds have suffered serious injuries. Women students have been assaulted by policemen, including by deliberately targeting their private parts.” Tharoor questioned the use of force, asking, "When a non-violent protest is taking place, what is the reason for a lathi charge?". On the other hand, BJP MPs Kangana Ranaut and Hema Malini criticised the protests, questioning their objective, with the latter claiming that demonstrations do not resolve issues.

The police action was also condemned by several public figures from the Indian film and music industries:

- Singer Arijit Singh criticised the conduct of the police and said that the actions of the Delhi Police will be remembered.
- Actress Shabana Azmi defended attending and supporting the CJP protest, recalled an asthma attack after tear gas, and urged the government to listen to the students.
- Actor Prakash Raj attended the protest, condemned the police action, and called the treatment of protesters shameful, stating, "We shall overcome this brutality.. this Tanashahi ..".
- Educator and Physics Wallah founder Alakh Pandey expressed support for the student protesters, urging the Centre to "listen to students" and stating that the movement was "not just about NEET".
- Actor Salman Khan described the movement as peaceful, and urged that education should remain above politics.
- Filmmaker Anurag Kashyap criticised the conduct of the Delhi Police during the protests, questioning "Is there one police personnel in this country who can stand up and say I won’t follow this order because it is wrong?".
- Singer and composer Vishal Dadlani condemned the police action, and called for accountability.
- Actress Alia Bhatt backed the students and stressed the importance of their voices, while asking whether anyone was "truly listening" to those speaking up for a better future.

Several other public figures, including Dia Mirza, Vir Das, Sonu Sood, Huma Qureshi, Naseeruddin Shah, and Johnny Lever, also condemned the police brutality against the protesters. Some also criticised the mistreatment and detention of activist Sonam Wangchuk.

== See also ==
- 2026 NEET controversy
- 2026 Delhi Jantar Mantar protests
- Gen Z protests

== Further readings ==
- Amnesty International (2026-07-20). India: Crackdown on peaceful protestors in New Delhi raises serious human rights concerns
- Amrita Singh, Nikita Saxena, Puja Sen, Shahid Tantray (2026-07-23). Defiance, chaos and repression at the CJP's Sansad March. The Caravan.
