= Reappropriation =

Valuing a formerly pejorative term in esteem

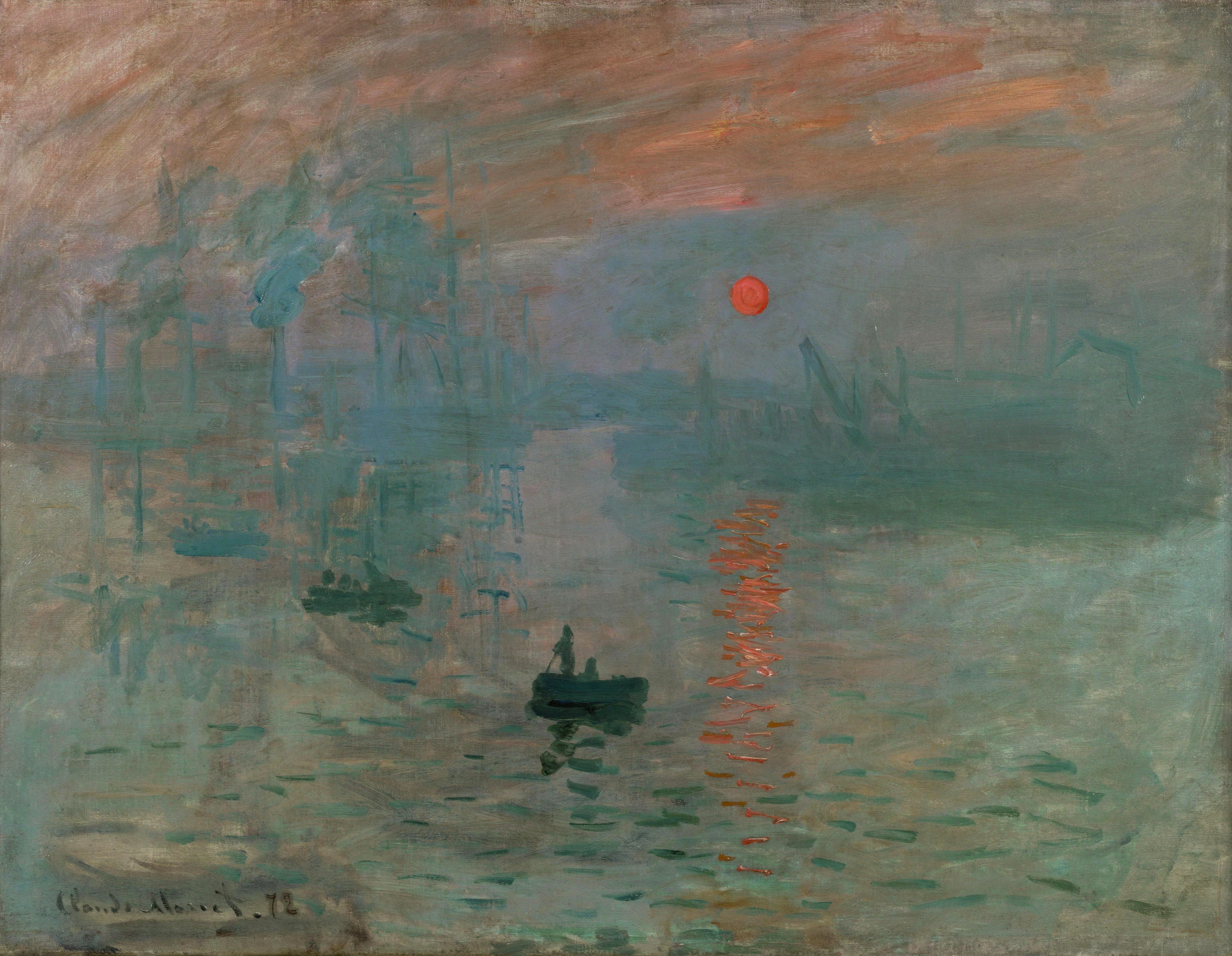
Claude Monet's Impression, soleil levant was ridiculed as "Impression-ist" in 1872, but the term then became the name of the art movement, "impressionism", and painters began to self-identify as "impressionist".

In linguistics, reappropriation, reclamation, or resignification is the cultural process by which a group reclaims words or artifacts that were previously used in a way disparaging of that group. It is a specific form of a semantic change (i.e., change in a word's meaning). Linguistic reclamation can have wider implications in the fields of discourse and has been described in terms of personal or sociopolitical empowerment.

== Characteristics ==
A reclaimed or reappropriated word is a word that was at one time pejorative but has been brought back into acceptable usage, usually starting within its original target, i.e. the communities that were pejoratively described by that word, and later spreading to the general populace as well. Some of the terms being reclaimed have originated as non-pejorative terms that over time became pejorative. Reclaiming them can be seen as restoring their original intent. This, however, does not apply to all such words as some were used in a derogatory fashion from the very beginning.

In terms of linguistic theory, reappropriation can be seen as a specific case of a type of a semantic change, namely, of amelioration – a process through which a word's meaning becomes more positive over time.

Robin Brontsema suggested that there are at least three mutually exclusive goals of reclamation:

1. Value reversal
2. Neutralization
3. Stigma exploitation

Value reversal refers to changing the meaning from pejorative to positive, while neutralization refers to changing the meaning from pejorative to neutral. Stigma exploitation, finally, refers to retaining the derogatory nature of such terms as a reminder that a given group has been subject to unfair treatment.

Reclamation can be seen as both a psychological, individual process and as a sociological, society-wide process. In terms of a personal process, it has been discussed in the context of empowerment that comes from "disarming the power of a dominant group to control one's own and others' views of oneself", and gaining control over the way one is described, and hence, one's self-image, self-control and self-understanding. Brontsema wrote that "At the heart of linguistic reclamation is the right of self-definition, of forging and naming one's own existence." Other scholars have connected this concept to that of self-labelling. The empowerment process, and the denial of language as a tool of oppression as abuse of power, has also been stressed by scholars such as Judith Butler and Michel Foucault, the latter who also referred to it as a "reverse discourse".

In terms of the wider socio-political empowerment process, reclamation process has also been credited with promoting social justice, and building group solidarity; activist groups that engage in this process have been argued to be more likely to be seen as representative of their groups and see those groups as raising in power and status in their society. Scholars have argued that those who use such terms to describe themselves in the act of reappropriation "will feel powerful and therefore see his or her group label as less stigmatizing. Observers will infer that the group has power and will therefore see the label as less saturated in negativity".

Although those terms are most often used in the context of language, this concept has also been used in relation to other cultural concepts, for example in the discussion of reappropriation of stereotypes, reappropriation of popular culture (e.g., the reappropriation of science fiction literature into elite, high literature), or reappropriation of traditions.

== Controversy and objections ==
Reclaimed words often remain controversial for a time, due to their original pejorative nature. For some terms, even "reclaimed" usage by members of the community concerned is a subject of controversy. Often, not all members of a given community support the idea that a particular slur should be reclaimed at all. In other cases, a word can be seen as acceptable when used by the members of the community that has reclaimed it (in-group usage), but its use by outside parties (out-group usage) can still be seen as derogatory and thus controversial. For example, Brontsema noted in 2003 in his discussion of the reclaimed terms that while "[the term nigger (sometimes nigga)] may be acceptable for black people to use it freely, it is off-limits to whites, whose usage of nigger cannot be the same, given its history and the general history of racial oppression and racial relations in the United States." A similar argument has been made in 2009 for words associated with the LGBT movement like queer or dyke. A related discourse occurred with regards to the Washington Redskins name controversy, with the Native American community divided on whether the term has been reclaimed or not.

Those opposed to the reclamation of terms have argued that such terms are irredeemable and are forever connected to their derogatory meaning, and their usage will continue to hurt those who remember its original intent and even reinforce the existing stigma. The supporters of reclamation argue, in turn, that many such words had non-derogatory meanings that are simply being restored and that in either case, reclaiming such a word denies it to those who would want to use it to oppress others and represents a form of moral victory for the group that reclaimed it.

In 2017, the US Supreme Court heard arguments for Matal v. Tam. In that case, the US Patent and Trademark Office refused a trademark registration for an Asian American band, The Slants, because it deemed the term disparaging. However, the court ruled unanimously in the band's favor. Washington University in St. Louis conducted an extensive study on reappropriation based on the band name and found that reclaimed words could be an effective tool for neutralizing disparaging words: "Reappropriation does seem to work in the sense of defusing insults, rendering them less disparaging and harmful."

For example, the word "queer" in the sense of "homosexual" was originally strongly offensive, echoing the negative connotations of the word's older meanings, included "strange" and "odd". Since the 1980s, this term was reclaimed by some gay people as a self-reference. From nowadays, because of this reason, this term is still considered offensive by some, especially when used by a person whose sexual identity is not queer.

== Examples ==
=== Sex and sexuality ===
There are many recent examples of linguistic re-appropriation in the areas of human sexuality, gender roles, sexual orientation, etc. Among these are:

- dyke
- faggot
- hermaphrodite
- queer

=== Politics ===
In England, Cavalier was a derogatory nickname reappropriated as self-identification, in contrast to the term Roundhead which, despite being used by the Royalists for the supporters of the Parliamentary cause, remained a derisory word up to the point of it being a punishable offense if used to refer to a soldier of the New Model Army. Tory (originally from the Middle Irish word for 'pursuer' tóraidhe), Whig (from whiggamore; see the Whiggamore Raid) and Suffragette are other British examples.

In the American colonies, British officers used Yankee, a term originated in reference to Dutch settlers, as a derogatory term against the colonists. British officers created the early versions of the song "Yankee Doodle", as a criticism of the uncultured colonists, but during the Revolution, as the colonists began to reappropriate the label Yankee as a point of pride, they likewise reappropriated the song, altering verses, and turning it into a patriotic anthem.

In the 1850s in the United States, a secretive political party was derisively dubbed the Know Nothing party, based on their penchant for saying "I know nothing" when asked for details by outsiders; this became the common name for the party. It eventually became a popular name, sufficiently so that consumer products like tea, candy, and even a freighter were branded with the name.

Anarchism was mostly a derogatory term used by opponents of collectivist forms of socialism, until it was adopted by the anarchist movement in the late 1800s.

During the 2016 United States presidential election, Hillary Clinton referred to some Trump supporters as a "Basket of deplorables". Many Trump supporters endorsed the phrase. Donald Trump also played the song "Do You Hear the People Sing?" from the musical Les Misérables as an introduction to one of his rallies, using a graphic captioned "Les Deplorables". Subsequently, Trump called Clinton a "nasty woman" during the final presidential debate, resulting in that expression being described as a "rallying cry" for women. It was soon featured on merchandise and used by Clinton's campaign surrogates.

=== Activism ===
In India, the Chief Justice of India, Surya Kant described unemployed youth activists in India, including media activists and right to information activists, as "cockroaches" and "parasites of society". In response, Abhijeet Dipke, a political communications strategist and activist, formed "Cockroach Janata Party", an activist movement that satirically describes its members as cockroaches and "chronically lazy and unemployed".

=== Religion ===
Rafida, an early derogatory term for those who rejected the Caliphate in favor of the Imamate, was reappropriated in Twelver Shiism, via sayings attributed to Shia Imams, that reframe this term favorably as those who reject oppression and injustice. In one such oral tradition, Rafida are identified as a small group among the people of Pharaoh who rejected his rule, undaunted by his threats of punishment. This tradition is a reference to verses 7:120–126 and 20:70–75 of the Quran. According to some Twelver traditions, the term Rafida appeared also in the Tawrat.

A later example of successful reclaiming is the term Jesuit to refer to members of the Society of Jesus. This was originally a derogatory term referring to people who too readily invoked the name of Jesus in their politics, but that members of the Society adopted over time for themselves, so that the word came to refer exclusively to them, and generally in a positive or neutral sense, even though the term "Jesuitical" is derived from the Society of Jesus and means 'manipulative, conspiring, treacherous, capable of intellectually justifying anything by convoluted reasoning'.

Other examples can be found in the origins of Methodism; early members were originally mocked for their "methodical" and rule-driven religious devotion, founder John Wesley embraced the term for his movement. Members of the Religious Society of Friends were termed Quakers as an epithet, but took up the term themselves. Similarly, the term Protestant was originally a derogatory term, and more recently the term pagan has been subject to a similar change in meaning.

=== Race, ethnicity, and nationality ===
To a lesser extent, and more controversially among the groups referred to, many racial, ethnic, and class terms have been reappropriated:

- Baster, the name is derived from bastaard, the Dutch word for "bastard". They are a Southern African ethnic group descended from White European men and Black African women. The Basters reappropriated it as a "proud name", claiming their ancestry and history.
- Black, and Negro by African Americans and to a lesser extent nigga, or nigger though the last two are still extremely controversial.
- Curry, used a derogatory term for South Asians (often in conjunction with muncher or slurper), reappropriated by some members of the South Asian expatriate or American-Born Confused Desi community.
- Jew by the Jewish people (the word used to be seen as pejorative in English). That process is still not complete as the related Yid can still carry pejorative connotations in English. Similarly, in some Slavic languages, the word Zhyd (Cyrillic: жид) can still be seen as pejorative. In Romanian the derived jidan remains highly pejorative.
- Kugel, playful South African English slang for a materialistic young woman, originally was a derogatory term used by the elder generation of South African Jews for a young Jewish woman who forsook traditional Jewish dress values for those of the ostentatiously wealthy and became overly materialistic and over-groomed. The term was then reclaimed by those women.
- Peckerwood, originally black slang in the Southern United States for poor white people, reclaimed by white prison gangs
- Smoggie, originally a derogatory term for people from the North East England town of Middlesbrough, in reference to the town's notorious industrial pollution, now commonly used in self-identification.
- White trash, a classist slur referring to poor white people, reappropriated by some in the Southern states of the United States of America as a cultural symbol and badge of pride - however this re-appropriation has not been as evident in mainstream British English syntax where it is used in a more condescending or sarcastic manner.
- Wog by Australians of Greek, Italian, Arab or Turkish descent.
- Ukrop, originally an ethnic slur for Ukrainians. Literally "dill", a pun: Ukrainian = ukrop. The slur was reappropriated by Ukrainians during the war in Donbas and later adopted by the UKROP party.

=== Disability ===
- Cripple, crip, gimp by people with disabilities.

=== Art movements ===
- Impressionists In 1874 during their first independent art show, critic Louis Leroy penned a hostile review of the show in Le Charivari newspaper under the title "The Exhibition of the Impression-ists". In particular he used the painting Impression, soleil levant by Claude Monet to ridicule the painters for their lack of seriousness preferring to paint "fleeting impressions of the moment" rather than allegorical or ultra-realist themes.
- Stuckism is an international art movement founded in 1999; its members produce figurative art. Tracey Emin, one of the Young British Artists known for their conceptual art, accused her then-boyfriend of lack of imagination or reach, of being "stuck". He took on the term.
- Shoegaze is a genre of music characterized by traits such as heavily distorted guitars. The term "shoegaze" was initially a pejorative label, criticizing performers for tending to stand still and closely watch their effects pedals during concerts; however, critics and artists later began to embrace the name.

=== Feminism ===
Words some feminist activists have argued should be reclaimed include:

- bitch
- cunt
- slut
- lady

== See also ==
- Détournement, a similar strategy used for images
- Dysphemism treadmill, the process by which offensive terms can become acceptable without deliberate intervention
- Gaysper, reappropriated LGBT symbol
- Geographical renaming, which can include reclaiming an earlier pre-colonial name
- Tai Ke – Taiwanese cultural term
