= Ajinkya Shinde =

Indian political organiser

National Organisation In-Charge of the Cockroach Janta Party
- Incumbent
- Assumed office 6 August 2026
- National Convenor: Abhijeet Dipke

Personal details
- Party: Cockroach Janta Party (from 2026)
- Other political affiliations: Aam Aadmi Party (2016–2026)
- Education: Dr. Babasaheb Ambedkar Technological University
- Occupation: Political organiser

Ajinkya Shinde is an Indian political organiser who serves as the national organisation in-charge of the Cockroach Janta Party (CJP). He was appointed to the position on 6 August 2026, when the organisation announced its National Working Committee and national leadership structure. He was previously associated with the Aam Aadmi Party (AAP), where he held organisational responsibilities in Maharashtra and Goa.

== Early life and education ==
Shinde is from Latur district, Maharashtra, and completed a Bachelor of Technology degree in computer science from Dr. Babasaheb Ambedkar Technological University, Lonere, in Raigad district. Before pursuing political work, he was employed by an information technology company in Pune.

== Political career ==
=== Aam Aadmi Party ===
Shinde previously worked with the Aam Aadmi Party. According to media reports, he worked with the party in Maharashtra and Goa, including organisational work in Goa from 2016 to 2017. He was also served as convener of the AAP's Pimpri-Chinchwad unit, social media coordinator for its Maharashtra unit and convener of its Maharashtra youth wing.

=== Cockroach Janta Party ===
On 6 August 2026, the Cockroach Janta Party announced Shinde's appointment as national organisation in-charge as part of its National Working Committee.

Shinde has been involved in the CJP's public campaigns, including its School Thik Karo initiative concerning the condition of government schools. He also helped organise demonstrations by the organisation in Mumbai.

On 10 October 2026, after CJP founder Abhijeet Dipke, co-convener Ashutosh Ranka and chief spokesperson Saurav Das were detained in Delhi, Shinde was designated to lead the organisation's planned protest at Jantar Mantar in their absence. The announcement followed a pre-recorded message by Dipke naming Shinde to lead the mobilisation if senior members were detained.

=== Legal issues ===
On 2 October 2026, Mumbai Police registered an FIR against Ajinkya Shinde and other CJP leaders due to an agitation that had taken place in Shivaji Park on the same day. As per Business Today, the case was filed on the ground that they indulged in an illegal assembly, shouted slogans and made speeches although their meeting was not permitted.

On 13 October 2026, Shinde and other leaders of CJP namely Ashutosh Ranka and Saurav Das were arrested by Delhi Police in the wake of a protest that took place at Jantar Mantar. According to the report in Scroll, Shinde was released on a personal bond whereas the other two leaders were put into five days' judicial custody. The leaders have been charged for breach of a bond and obstruction of a public servant, said the legal affairs in-charge of the CJP.

== Personal life ==
Shinde is a resident of Latur, Maharashtra. he completed his Bachelor of Technology degree from Dr. Babasaheb Ambedkar Technological University, Lonere.
