= Reservation Hatao Andolan =

Social and political initiative in India

Reservation Reforms Movement
- Formation: 2026
- Type: Social movement, political advocacy

Reservation Hatao Andolan is a social and political initiative in India that advocates for reform in caste-based reservation. Their core demand is to make reservation poverty-based and remove reservation in India in public employment and higher education institutions.

== Formation ==
The Reservation Hatao Andolan was established in mid-2026 against caste-based reservations, and sought to make reservation solely poverty-based, following the success of satirical youth movement Cockroach Janta Party (CJP) in the 2026 Delhi Jantar Mantar protests.

== Charter of demands ==
The Reservation Hatao Andolan prepared a charter of demands, which included:

- National Commission for the General Category
- Reservation to be poverty-based instead of caste-based
- Complete rollback of the UGC's 2026 caste-equity rules
- A review of the SC/ST (Prevention of Atrocities) Act

== Protests ==
=== Jantar Mantar protests ===
On 21 August 2026, a crowd of protestors descended on the roads around Jantar Mantar in the national capital of New Delhi. The protest was caused by the call of the Instagram page named "Reservation Hatao Andolan". The instagram page shared a poster announcing a "peaceful protest" on 21 August at 2 pm at the Jantar Mantar. Many of the protestors were mobilised by organisations such as Karni Sena and Ranvir Sena, a feudal upper-caste militia. The protestors sought an overhaul of the current reservation system in the country. They carried placards raising slogans like "Aarakshan gareeb ko mile, jaati ko nahi" that translates to "reservation should go to the poor, not castes", etc. Similarly, members of Reservation Reform Alliance staged a sit in demonstration called Reservation Reform Satyagraha at the Jantar Mantar, against the caste-based reservation in the country.

During the protests, thousands of protesters gathered at the Jantar Mantar under the banner of Reservation Hatao Andolan. According to the Delhi Police, no permission was granted for the demonstration of the protests at Jantar Mantar. They clarified that prohibitory orders under Section 163 of the BNSS were already in force in the district. A large number of police personnel and the Rapid Action Force were deployed at the site. Similarly, to ensure the maintenance of law and order during the protestors gathering, several barricades were installed at the site as a precautionary measure. The protestors alleged that internet jammers were installed in the area.

Members of the Akhil Bharatiya Kshatriya Mahasabha, also involved in the protests, argued that reservations should be based on economics and not caste. During the protests, a clash was also observed between the protestors and police personnel. Over 50 protestors were detained by the Delhi Police over the lack of permission for the protests.

=== Connaught Place protests ===
On 23 August 2026, around 300 protestors gathered at the Connaught Place in Delhi, linked to the RHA. Around 20 protestors were detained by Delhi Police, since the protests were organised without permission.

== See also ==
- Reservation in India
- Youth For Equality
- Affirmative action
- Economically Weaker Section
- Patidar reservation agitation
- Caste system in India
