= Carmen Fields =

American journalist

- Education: Boston University (MS), Lincoln University (BA)
- Occupations: Journalist and writer
- Father: Ernie Fields

Carmen Fields is a Boston journalist.

== Early life, education, and career ==
Fields grew up in Tulsa, Oklahoma, and was raised by her parents, Bernice Copeland Fields and musician Ernie Fields.

Fields majored in journalism at Lincoln University, Missouri. Fields also studied at Boston University's School of Communication and graduated with a master's degree in broadcast journalism in 1973. Fields' first journalism job was at the Boston Globe. Fields went on to work as a television reporter and anchor. Fields was part of the Pulitzer Prize-winning Boston Globe that reported on school desegregation in Boston. Fields' interview with Nation of Islam leader, Louis Farrakhan, in 1980 was nominated for a regional Emmy.

She was also an assistant professor of journalism at Northeastern University. In 2023, Fields published Going Back to T-Town: The Ernie Fields Territory Big Band, a book based on her father's travels with his band during the Jim Crow. She is married to author, Lorenz Finison.

== Recognition ==
In 2023, she was recognized as one of "Boston’s most admired, beloved, and successful Black Women leaders" by the Black Women Lead project. Fields was also awarded the Pulitzer Prize along with the Globe team for (COM’73) for its coverage of the bitter racial divide over court-ordered busing to desegregate the city’s schools in 1975.
