= Cockroach Janta Party =

Indian youth-based activist movement

- Abbreviation: CJP
- Leader: Abhijeet Dipke
- Spokesperson: Saurav Das; Ashutosh Ranka; Aafreen Nawaz; Deepak Baliyan; Ratna Singh; Vaishnavi Gaur; Prashant Kamboj
- Founder: Abhijeet Dipke
- Founded: 16 May 2026; 6 months ago
- Headquarters: New Delhi, India
- Ideology: Political satire Youth politics Populism; Anti-authoritarianism
- Political position: Left-wing
- Colours: Brown
- Slogan: Voice of the Lazy & Unemployed
- ECI status: Not registered

Website
- cockroachjantaparty.org

The Cockroach Janta Party (CJP; lit. 'Cockroach People's Party') is an Indian youth-based activist movement founded on 16 May 2026 by political communications strategist and activist Abhijeet Dipke. It is structured as a mock political party and communicates through the use of satire. The organization conducts protests and volunteering activities to voice concerns of the youth, and is notable for protest against medical entrance examination irregularities resulting in resignation of Union Education Minister, Dharmendra Pradhan and for protests against Chief Election Commissioner, Gyanesh Kumar, over alleged electoral-roll irregularities. Its five-point manifesto addresses parliamentary conduct, voter disenfranchisement, women's political representation and media centralization.

The movement's name parodies India's ruling Bharatiya Janata Party (BJP) and refers its members as "cockroaches", which is a reappropriation of remarks by the Chief Justice of India, Surya Kant describing unemployed or 'unqualified' youth activists in media activism, legal activism and RTI activism. It is not registered as a political party with the Election Commission of India (ECI).

== Background ==
The origins of the movement are tied to a contempt plea filed in the Supreme Court of India concerning a delay by the Delhi High Court in conferring a senior advocate designation. A two-judge bench led by the Chief Justice of India (CJI), Surya Kant, and Justice Joymalya Bagchi refused to hear the case, remarking that the court was waiting for an appropriate case to direct a Central Bureau of Investigation inquiry into lawyers practising under fake degrees.

While reprimanding the petitioner's lawyer for unprofessional conduct regarding the language used on social media and the use of frivolous litigation targeting the judiciary system, the CJI drew parallels to unemployed individuals who turn to social and mass media, along with public activism, to attack government institutions. His comparison of such individuals to "cockroaches" and "parasites" drew widespread backlash.

There are already parasites of society who attack the system, and you want to join hands with them? There are youngsters like cockroaches; they don't get any employment, and they don't have any place in a profession. Some of them become media, some of them become social media, some of them become RTI activists, some of them become other activists, and they start attacking everyone... And you people file contempt petitions.

The CJI later issued a clarification stating that his remarks had been misquoted and that he was specifically criticising individuals who had entered "legal, media, social media, and other noble professions" using fake degrees, and added that he held India's youth in high regard. Despite the clarification, the controversial "cockroach" label stuck with youth commentators.

== Formation ==
Abhijeet Dipke, a political communications strategist, launched the "Cockroach Janta Party" (CJP, lit. 'Cockroach People's Party') online on 16 May 2026 as a form of political satire targeting the political establishment. The party's name refers to remarks by the Chief Justice of India (CJI) and parodies the ruling Bharatiya Janata Party (BJP).

Dipke used artificial intelligence tools to design the website and manifesto, and to generate images to promote the movement, using the tagline "Voice of the Lazy & Unemployed" and describing itself as a "platform for all the 'cockroaches' out there". Within days of its launch, the movement gained a massive social media following, rapidly overtaking the official Instagram handles of the major political parties in India. By the end of its first week, the movement had crossed 15 million followers on Instagram. CJP's X account was taken down in view of "potential to cause chaos" regarding NEET controversy during its first two months of operation while its alternative account remained operational.

Dipke said that the CJP is not affiliated with any political organisation and intends to serve as a platform for young Indians who feel left out of mainstream politics, although he has welcomed support of organisations across the political spectrum on occasions of protests, including from left-wing student organisations like AISF and AIYF, the chief of right-wing Hindutva organisation, Rashtriya Swayamsevak Sangh, and political organisations, Aam Aadmi Party, Shiv Sena and Communist Party of India (Marxist), among others.

== Structure ==
=== Leadership and spokespeople ===
Abhijeet Dipke founded the CJP movement on 16 May 2026. Before founding the CJP, Dipke volunteered with the social media team of the Aam Aadmi Party, from 2020 to 2023. During this period, he produced meme-based content aimed at young voters in the 2020 Delhi Legislative Assembly election and advised the Delhi government's education department on communications. Originally from a Mahar Dalit family in Aurangabad, Maharashtra, he has graduated in communications from Boston University and returned to India in June 2026. Dipke has cited the writings of B. R. Ambedkar as a major influence.

The CJP initially appointed three spokespersons - Vijeta Dahiya, Saurav Das, and Ashutosh Ranka. They later dismissed Vijeta Dahiya and relieved him of all official responsibilities after a video of him eating at a fast-food outlet during the party's Parliament march drew criticism. The party later inducted four new spokespersons to their team - Vaishnavi Gaur, Aafreen Nawaz, Deepak Baliyan, and Ratna Singh.

On 6 August 2026, Abhijeet Dipke was elected as the National Convenor of the Cockroach Janata Party (CJP), following a meeting of the party's National Working Committee in Chhatrapati Sambhajinagar, Maharashtra.

=== Current leadership ===
Name	Position	Term of office	Ref.
Abhijeet Dipke	Founder and National Convenor	May 2026 – present	
Saurav Das	Co-Convener and Chief Spokesperson	August 2026 – present	
Ashutosh Ranka	Co-Convener and Lead Policy Strategist	August 2026 – present	
Aafreen Nawaz	National Secretary	August 2026 – present	
Ajinkya Shinde	Organisation In-charge	August 2026 – present	

=== National Working Committee ===
The National Working Committee is the central organisational body of the Cockroach Janta Party (CJP). The committee was announced in August 2026 as part of the organisation's efforts to establish a national leadership structure and coordinate its campaigns and activities across India. Its office-bearers were assigned responsibilities covering organisation, media, legal affairs, research and policy, technology, finance and regional coordination.

==== Members ====
The following table lists the committee's publicly reported office-bearers and their responsibilities as announced in August 2026.

Name	Position or responsibility	Ref.
Abhijeet Dipke	Founder and National Convenor	
Ashutosh Ranka	Co-Convenor and Lead Policy Strategist	
Saurav Das	Co-Convenor and Chief Spokesperson	
Ajinkya Shinde	National Organisation In-Charge	
Deepak Baliyan	Organisation Co-In-Charge; Head of the North Zone	
Aafreen Nawaz	National Secretary	
Vijay Reddy Mallangi	Media Lead; Head of the South Zone	
Ratna Singh	Legal Affairs Lead	
Vaishnavi Gaur	Research and Policy Lead	
Rohan Deshpande	Technology Lead	
Yogesh Ingale	Finance Lead; Head of the West Zone	
Ankit Bharadwaj	Head of the East and North-East Zones	

=== Trademark and ownership ===
The name "Cockroach Janta Party" has become the subject of a trademark dispute, with at least three applications filed to register it, including applications by individuals and by a proprietorship named Dipke's Cockroach Janta Party.

== Ideology ==
The CJP describes itself as "a political front of the youth, by the youth, for the youth: secular, socialist, democratic, and lazy." Dipke has stated that the campaign is not interested in becoming a traditional political party and has no desire to induct established politicians, noting that "Gen Z wouldn't like it if current politicians joined the CJP." although, the party has inducted some mainstream politicians. According to Dipke, the movement seeks greater transparency and accountability in government spending, explicitly criticising non-transparent initiatives. The core mission is to provide a platform for young people marginalised by labels such as "lazy" or "cockroaches", using satire as a political tool.

The party released a formal five-point manifesto in May 2026:

- No Chief Justice shall be granted a Rajya Sabha seat as a post-retirement reward.
- If any legitimate vote is deleted, the Chief Election Commissioner shall be arrested under the Unlawful Activities (Prevention) Act, as taking away voting rights is "no less than terrorism" (in reference to the 2025 Indian electoral controversy).
- Women shall receive 50% reservation (instead of 33%) without increasing the strength of Parliament; 50% of all Cabinet positions shall be reserved for women.
- All media houses owned by the Adani Group and Reliance Industries ("Ambani") shall have their licences cancelled to make way for independent media. Bank accounts of "Godi media anchors" shall be investigated.
- Any Member of the Legislative Assembly (MLA) or Member of Parliament (MP) who defects from one party to another shall be barred from contesting elections and holding public office for 20 years.

Additional points suggested by activist Anjali Bhardwaj and accepted by the party include ensuring the CJP remains answerable under the RTI Act and refusing to accept any anonymous donations, in reference to RTI activism and PM Cares Fund.

=== Membership ===
The eligibility criteria for joining the CJP are deliberately satirical:

- Unemployed ("by force, by choice, or by principle")
- Lazy ("refers only to physical activity")
- Chronically online ("at least 11 hours daily, including bathroom breaks")
- Ability to rant professionally ("content must be sharp, honest, and point at something that matters")

The party states that religion, caste, and gender are not considered in the membership process.

== Reception ==
The movement has attracted endorsements from opposition leaders and public figures, including Congress politicians in Karnataka, while also facing criticism and pushback, such as the withholding of its X account in India. Some observers have drawn parallels to the 2011 Indian anti-corruption movement, describing it as a significant outlet for youth anger over corruption and dysfunction in the system, although critics have questioned whether its rapid rise can be sustained. Commenters and analysts have noted the impact of youth pro-activeness in political discussions and reach of digital media in relation to CJP's movement, and posed speculation on broader impact on governance and journalism.

=== Support ===
Social activist Anna Hazare expressed support for young people backing the Cockroach Janata Party, stating that the government should encourage such youth participation rather than ignore it. Social activist Anjali Bhardwaj and human rights advocate Saad Kassis-Mohamed also expressed support for the movement. Activist-lawyer Prashant Bhushan also supported the movement and has spoken about the issues raised by CJP, urging the use of its platforms to demand accountability, and to call for a "right to employment" law providing jobs or unemployment allowances for citizens between 21 and 60 years of age.

Among the political figures expressing support to CJP were Congress MP Shashi Tharoor, who called the movement an excellent outlet for youth frustration, and Trinamool Congress leaders Mamata Banerjee and Abhishek Banerjee, whose full support was announced by party leader Derek O'Brien. The movement was also supported by several actors, filmmakers, and digital media personalities, who voiced their support online, prompting followers to post under the hashtag #MainBhiCockroach (transl. 'I too am a cockroach').

Activist Sonam Wangchuk supported the CJP by describing himself as an "honorary cockroach" and later began a solidarity hunger strike during CJP-led Jantar Mantar Protests. Leftist student organisations, including the All India Students' Federation and the All India Youth Federation, also formally endorsed the protests by CJP. Protestors also gained the support of political activists Suzanna Arundhati Roy and Yogendra Salim Yadav and actors Prakash Raj and Naseeruddin Shah Anna Hazare also supported the protests and urged the government to heed its young supporters, reflecting youth concerns over unemployment, exam paper leaks, and accountability.

=== Criticism ===
Social media users initially remained divided; some labelled the CJP as "mere meme politics", while others considered it an outlet for frustrations of the youth. Following the CJP's transition to physical protests, commentators drew parallels to the 2011 Indian anti-corruption movement and the 2020–2021 Indian farmers' protest. Critics questioned the long-term impact of the movement, noting that developing a coherent ideological vision that connects consistently with voters remains a significant challenge and have also raised concern about sustainability of the movement itself beyond its initial period of attention.

Some commentators have also noted similarity between activities of CJP and Aam Admi Party, and also criticised several of its core members having been affiliated with AAP in the past. Former volunteer activist, Manish Brahmbhatt launched 'Cockroach Janata Party-Democratic (CJP(D))', after he accused CJP of abandoning its student-led origins and for aligning too closely with the Aam Aadmi Party. Questions about the CJP's political neutrality resurfaced following its activities in the states governed by different parties, with Congress leader Sachin Pilot alleging CJP applied its 'School Theek Karo' campagin inconsistently to favour AAP-ruled states, which CJP has denied.

Atul Limaye, joint general secretary of the Hindu nationalist organisation Rashtriya Swayamsevak Sangh (RSS), called the CJP-led protests at Jantar Mantar stated that the students' genuine and spontaneous concerns had been co-opted by organised left-wing politics and considered it illegitimate.

=== Misinformation, attacks, and threats ===
Union ministers Sukanta Majumdar and Kiren Rijiju alleged that most of the CJP's followers were from Pakistan and accused the movement of organizing "anti-India" protests attempting to destabilise the country. In response, CJP founder Abhijeet Dipke had shared a screen recording of the account's audience analytics in May 2026, showing that more than 94% of its audience was in India which is supported by independent estimates by Decode Internet. In May 2026, petitions were filed in Allahabad High Court and Supreme Court seeking investigation into CJP for alleged "anti-national activities" which were dismissed. Union Minister Kiren Rijiju and American singer Mary Millben, also alleged CJP to be backed by George Soros. CJP has denied any foreign funding by challenging members to show proof. In July 2026, Ministry of External Affairs denied any information on its foreign funding to the media. Dipke also said that he had received death threats through WhatsApp from anonymous telephone numbers.

In response to the misinformation, Dipke stated that political interests were attempting to discredit and extinguish Gen Z-led youth movements. He suggested the pushback was an effort to distract from India's high unemployment rate and fear-monger about protests similar to those seen in Nepal or in Bangladesh.

=== Government ===
On 14 August 2026, the Vijay-led Tamil Nadu government's Collegiate Education Department issued an order directing school education, higher education, police, and district administration to prevent students from participating in protests by the Left parties and the CJP. The order was later withdrawn by the government on 19 August 2026 upon receiving criticism.

== Activities ==
Following its online rise, the movement began offline mobilisation through organised community service, including clean-up drives with volunteers dressed in cockroach costumes, before eventually expanding its scope to organising protests. The movement has also focused on demanding better education infrastructure of government schools.

=== 2026 Jantar Mantar protests ===
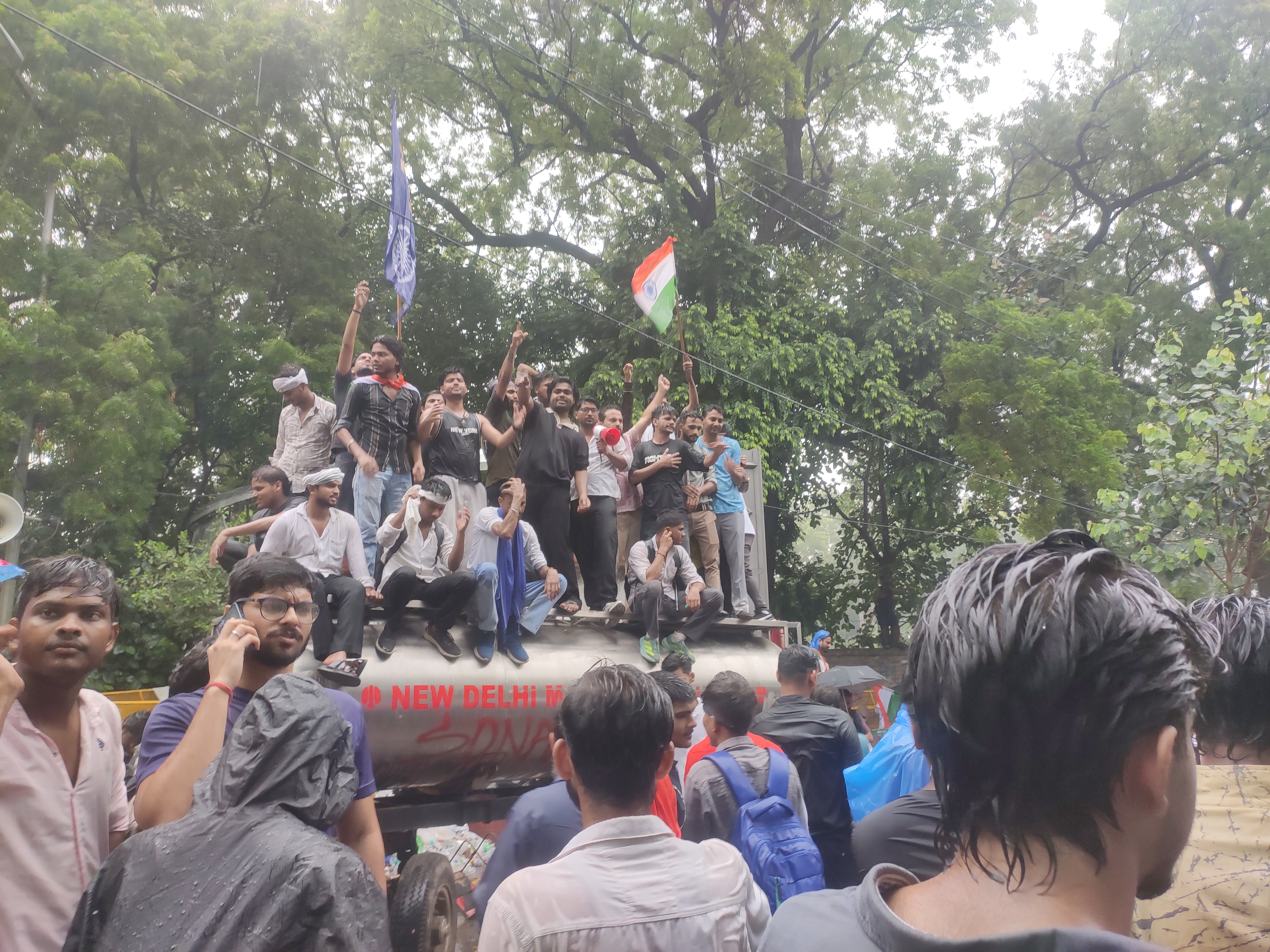
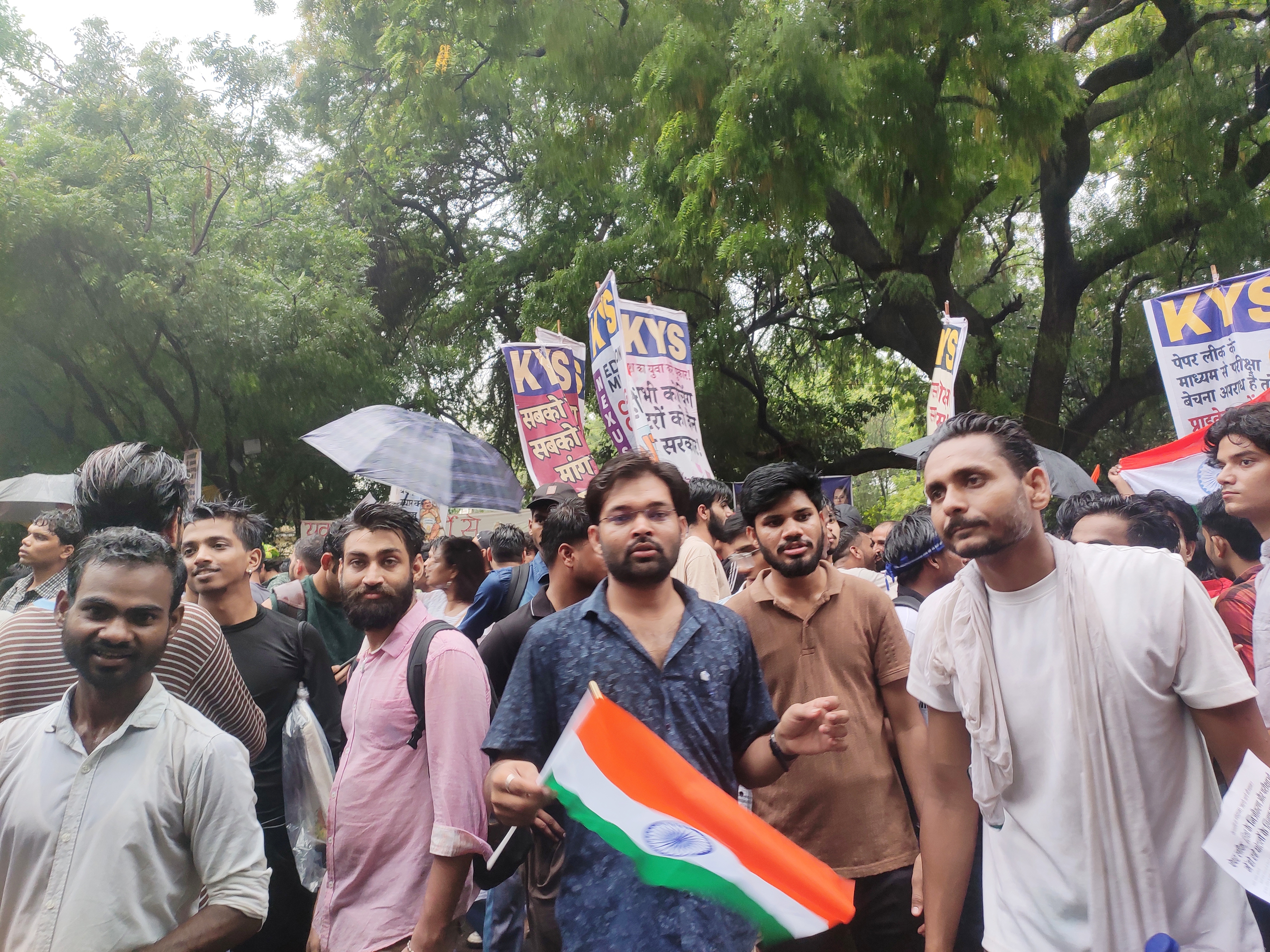
Students protesting at the 2026 Delhi Jantar Mantar Protests

In June 2026, the CJP started organising a series of protests expressing concerns regarding the transparency, accountability, and technical failures on the administration of competitive examinations. The party called for the resignation of Union Education Minister Dharmendra Pradhan over the NEET 2026 Paper leak and CBSE On-Screen Marking irregularity. Dipke released an "Education/Exam Manifesto" calling for reforms to stop question paper leaks and reduce delays in declaration of results. Pradhan responded by accusing the CJP of undermining democratic processes and promised to crack down on the "paper mafia".

After demands remained unmet, CJP began an indefinite protest at Jantar Mantar, New Delhi starting from 20 June, and activist Sonam Wangchuk initiated an indefinite hunger strike in support of CJP alongside six students from the AISA from 28 June. On 18 July, on the orders of the Delhi High Court, Wangchuk was forcibly removed from the protest site by police citing safety concerns. In response, CJP announced Sansad Chalo march, where 10,000–50,000 protestors attempted to march towards the Parliament of India on the same day, despite receiving prohibitory orders against it. Delhi Police used baton charge, pellet guns and fired tear gas shells to manage the crowds after the protestors broke the barricade and assaulted the police personnel, leaving at least 178 people injured according to the Delhi police, including 60 protestors and 118 security personnel, and 70 protestors being detained. The incident drew criticism from opposition leaders and human-rights organisations over allegations that police used excessive force against protesters. The Supreme Court formed a 'High-powered enquiry committee' to collect and investigate all instance of violence and harassment in the protests.

On 24 July, Wangchuk announced the breaking of his 26-day hunger strike, after prolonged negotiations with the government, that he had done so under various conditions, including withdrawal of cases against non-violent protestors and compensation for students that committed suicide in the aftermath of the NEET examination paper leaks, and in view of possible violence in the country. On the same date, union ministers JP Nadda and Jitendra Singh attended a meeting with CJP to hear their demands.

Pradhan resigned as Union Education Minister on 25 July. Many protesters considered the development a major victory for the movement, and further protests were halted. On 31 July, the government introduced an amendment to the Public Examinations (Prevention of Unfair Means) Act, 2024 in the Lok Sabha, increasing the punishment under Section 10 of the act from 5 years imprisonment and fine up to 1 million rupees to 10 years imprisonment and fine up to 100 million rupees for businesses and 5 million rupees for individuals.

=== Anti-CEC Protests ===
In September 2026 an Indian Express investigation reported that Election Commissioners Sukhbir Singh Sandhu and Vivek Joshi had formally objected at least 14 times to decisions taken by Chief Election Commissioner Gyanesh Kumar in connection with the Special Intensive Revision of electoral rolls. The CJP demanded Kumar's resignation, a freeze on the SIR process, restoration of the January 2025 voter lists, repeal of the 2023 appointment law, and broader electoral reforms. It organised protests in Delhi and Mumbai under a "Jail Bharo Andolan" strategy despite denial of permission.

On 10 October 2026, the Cockroach Janta Party (CJP) and other groups attempted to hold a demonstration at Jantar Mantar in New Delhi, demanding the resignation of Chief Election Commissioner Gyanesh Kumar over the Special Intensive Revision (SIR) of electoral rolls. The Delhi Police had denied permission for the demonstration, imposed security restrictions ahead of the planned protest and briefly detained several members for the day citing preventative measures including CJP members, Abhijeet Dipke, Saurav Das and Ashutosh Ranka, opposition party members including Arvind Kejriwal, Pinarayi Vijayan, Manik Sarkar, Mamata Banerjee, Atishi Marlena, Brinda Karat and John Brittas and reportedly over 7,000 protestors that had gathered despite detention of key members. The CJP paused protest in mid-October in view of festival season and announced resuming of protests after Diwali.

== See also ==
- Gen Z protests
- List of frivolous political parties
- List of Indian student organisations
- India Against Corruption
- Corruption in India
- Reservation Hatao Andolan
