= Ajinkya Joshi =

Indian cricketer

Ajinkya Joshi (born 19 November 1986) is an Indian cricketer. He is a left-handed batsman and a left-arm slow bowler who plays for Maharashtra. He was born in Thane. He attended Seth Dagaduram Katariya High School in Pune.

Joshi, who appeared for Maharashtra from Under-14 level to Under-22 level, made his List A debut during the 2004-05 Ranji Trophy One-Day season, against Gujarat. He made three further appearances during the competition, in which Maharashtra finished second-bottom of their group.

Joshi made a single first-class appearance for the side, during the 2007–08 season, against Karnataka. Joshi failed to score a run in either innings in which he batted.

Joshi was Maharashtra's most-used bowler during the match, bowling 44 overs, from which he took figures of 4–133, including the wicket of Sunil Joshi.

Joshi continued to play regularly for the Under-22s team until 2007–08, making just a single appearance for the side in the following season. A CK Nayudu Trophy finalist in his penultimate season, Joshi took three wickets in the final, though Maharashtra finished as beaten finalists.

In 2009, Joshi played for India Revenue in the Sahara BCCI Corporate Trophy.
