= Saurav Das (political activist) =

Indian independent journalist and political activist

- Das in 2026
- Born: 1998 or 1999 (age 27–28)
- Occupations: Independent journalist and political activist
- Known for: Spokesperson of Cockroach Janta Party (CJP)

Saurav Das is independent journalist and political activist. He is chief spokesperson of the Cockroach Janta Party.

== Life ==
Das earned a BA in journalism and mass communication in 2019. He worked as a post video producer from 2021 to 2022 and as a content associate from 2022 to 2023. He has worked as an independent investigative journalist since 2020.

== In the news ==
A PIL was filed in the Madras High Court to sought the background information of Das's nationality.

Das was detained by Delhi police in a trespassing case during the 13 October jantar mantar protest. He was sent to five day judicial custody. He got released from the tihar jail on 21 October and the case was transferred to Crime Branch. He was also summoned by Crime Branch along with Ashutosh Ranka for the trespassing case.
