= Abhijeet Dipke =

Indian political activist (born 1995)

- Dipke in 2026
- Born: 29 September 1995 (age 31); Aurangabad, Maharashtra, India
- Education: Boston University College of Communication (MSc)
- Occupation: Political communication strategist
- Known for: Founder of Cockroach Janta Party (CJP)

Abhijeet Dipke (born 29 September 1995) is an Indian political communication strategist and founder of the political satire movement Cockroach Janta Party (CJP). The movement organised demonstrations including a protest at Jantar Mantar in New Delhi in June 2026. Before founding the movement, Dipke worked with the social-media team of the Aam Aadmi Party (AAP) and served as a communications adviser to the Delhi government's education department. Dipke is a Dalit and a follower of B. R. Ambedkar.

== Early life and education ==
Dipke was born on 29 September 1995 in Aurangabad, Maharashtra. He belongs to the Mahar caste. His father, Bhagwanrao Dipke, is a retired engineer who worked for the Maharashtra Industrial Development Corporation, and his mother, Anita Dipke, is a homemaker. He attended school in Chhatrapati Sambhaji Nagar and later studied at S. B. College. His father initially enrolled him in an engineering programme, but Dipke left the course and subsequently studied journalism and mass communication in Pune. Dipke later moved to the United States, where he received a Master of Science in public relations from the Boston University College of Communication.

== Career ==
From 2020 to 2023, Dipke worked as a volunteer with the social-media team of the Aam Aadmi Party (AAP). During the 2020 Delhi Legislative Assembly election, he produced meme-based digital content intended to engage younger voters. He also worked as a communications adviser to the education department of the Government of Delhi. He left the party's media team in 2023 before moving to the United States for postgraduate study.

=== Cockroach Janta Party ===
On 15 May 2026, Chief Justice of India Surya Kant made comments during a Supreme Court hearing in which he compared some unemployed young people and social-media activists to cockroaches. Kant later said that his remarks had been misconstrued. Dipke responded on X the following day by asking, "What if all cockroaches come together?" The post went viral, and he established the Cockroach Janta Party as a satirical online platform. A website and online membership form were subsequently created for the movement.

The movement initially used humour and political satire to address issues including unemployment, inflation, examination paper leaks, gender representation and media ownership. Within its first week, it attracted hundreds of thousands of online registrations and millions of followers on Instagram. Dipke described the CJP as an independent platform for young Indians who felt excluded from conventional party politics. Initially, the "Cockroach'" movement concerned education reforms but later it grew into a broader protest to cover other issues such as unemployment, government accountability and economic opportunities. It has gained support of a number of students, professionals, and activists in India.

The CJP's X account was later withheld in India in response to a legal demand. Dipke also alleged that attempts had been made to compromise the movement's social-media accounts and that its website had been taken offline. Reuters reported that it could not independently verify these allegations and that relevant government ministries had not responded to requests for comment.

=== Protest movement ===
In June 2026, Dipke returned to India from Boston to lead a protest at New Delhi's Jantar Mantar monument. After this, Dipke led the CJP's first street demonstration at Jantar Mantar in New Delhi. Protesters called for the resignation of education minister Dharmendra Pradhan over repeated examination paper leaks and other alleged irregularities in national examinations. The demonstrations expanded during June and July, with supporters maintaining a protest camp in central Delhi. Dipke briefly undertook a hunger strike after education reformer Sonam Wangchuk was moved to hospital while fasting in support of the protesters' demands.

On 20 July, thousands of protesters attempted to march towards the Parliament, despite police restrictions. Police used tear gas and batons to disperse sections of the crowd, and clashes resulted in injuries to protesters and police officers. Following the clashes, Dipke said the movement would continue its sit-in but would suspend further street marches because of concerns for participants' safety. On 25 July 2026, Dharmendra Pradhan resigned as education minister. Reuters described the campaign as one of the largest youth-led challenges faced by the government of prime minister Narendra Modi since he took office in 2014.

=== October 2026 detentions and release ===
On 10 October 2026, Delhi Police detained Abhijeet Dipke and co-convenors Saurav Das and Ashutosh Ranka at Indira Gandhi International Airport in Delhi, where they had arrived ahead of a planned protest at Jantar Mantar against the Special Intensive Revision (SIR) of electoral rolls. Dipke had publicly stated that the protest would proceed despite the denial of police permission. Police cited the short notice given for the application, alleged non-compliance with directions during an earlier protest, and concerns about public safety, law and order, and traffic management. Restrictions under Section 163 of the Bharatiya Nagarik Suraksha Sanhita were also in force in parts of New Delhi.

Dipke's paternal grandmother, Savitribai Dipke, died on 10 October at the family's ancestral village of Santuk Pimpri in Hingoli district, Maharashtra. His family and CJP associates alleged that the police delayed his release, preventing him from attending her funeral. Delhi Police said that officers informed Dipke of the death and offered to help arrange travel to his hometown. On 11 October, a court ordered the release of Dipke, Das and Ranka after they were produced before an executive magistrate. Dipke subsequently travelled to Maharashtra.

Delhi Police subsequently released a video showing officers informing Dipke of his grandmother's death. Dipke disputed the police's account, alleging that the video was edited and that he had not been given adequate access to his family and lawyer. Police maintained that officers had offered assistance with phone calls and travel arrangements.

On 16 October, police detained Dipke again after serving him a notice prohibiting a planned CJP rally, titled "Lehra Do Tiranga", at Connaught Place in Delhi. The proposed demonstration was associated with the party's opposition to the Election Commission's handling of electoral rolls and its demand for the resignation of Chief Election Commissioner Gyanesh Kumar. Dipke was released on conditional bail on 17 October after signing a peace bond, according to press reports.

== Views and positions ==
Dipke has described the CJP as a platform rather than a conventional political party and has said that it is not affiliated with the AAP or another established party. He has stated that the movement seeks to create space for younger people to participate in public debate while remaining peaceful and democratically organised. The CJP's published proposals have included measures relating to examination reform, youth employment, women's representation in Parliament and the Cabinet, restrictions on post-retirement political appointments for judges, and media ownership. During its 2026 protests, the movement primarily focused on alleged examination irregularities, accountability for paper leaks and the resignation of the education minister.

== Personal life ==
Dipke lived in Boston, Massachusetts, while studying at Boston University. He returned to India in June 2026 to participate in the Cockroach Janta Party's (CJP) demonstrations. Following the movement's rapid growth, his parents publicly expressed concern about the personal risks associated with his political activism. Dipke belongs to the Dalit community, according to reports in the Indian media.

In May 2026, Dipke alleged that he and members of his family had received threatening messages after CJP gained prominence online. He shared screenshots of messages that reportedly demanded the closure of the movement's accounts. The allegations were reported by Indian news organisations and Reuters, which stated that it could not independently verify the messages. In July 2026, a woman threw an ink-like liquid at Dipke while he was addressing supporters at a protest at Jantar Mantar. The woman accused the movement of insulting the Hindu deity Rama.
