= 2026 anti-CEC protests =

Anti-CEC protests in India

2026 protests against the Chief Election Commissioner of India
- Part of the 2026 Indian electoral controversy and Gen Z protests in Asia
- Protesters being detained in 2026 anti-CEC protests at Jantar Mantar
- Date: 25 September 2026 – present
- Location: Primarily New Delhi, Mumbai, and other cities across India
- Caused by: 2026 Indian electoral controversy; Media reports of objections by two Election Commissioners to decisions concerning the Special Intensive Revision (SIR) of electoral rolls; Opposition allegations of large-scale deletions of voter entries and partisan conduct by the Election Commission of India
- Goals: Resignation and criminal prosecution of Chief Election Commissioner, Gyanesh Kumar; Independent inquiry and suspension or reversal of the 2025-26 Special Intensive Revision process; Transformative legislative changes upholding transparency and trust of the Election Commission; Return to ballot-paper voting, demanded by some opposition parties
- Methods: Marches, rallies, sit-ins, and attempts to reach Jantar Mantar and Election Commission offices
- Status: Ongoing; some protesters required to execute bonds to maintain peace

Parties
Election Commission of India; Government of India; Ministry of Home Affairs (India); Ministry of Defence; National Security Council; Supreme Court of India; Bharatiya Janata Party Others: Janata Dal (United); Telugu Desam Party; Nationalist Citizens Party of India; Shiv Sena (Eknath Shinde)	INDIA bloc; Indian National Congress; Samajwadi Party; Mamata All India Trinamool Congress; Shiv Sena (UBT); Communist Party of India; Communist Party of India (Marxist); Aam Aadmi Party; Others: Communist Party of India (Marxist-Leninist) (Liberation); Samajwadi Party; All India Forward Bloc; Revolutionary Socialist Party (India); Aam Aadmi Party; Nationalist Congress Party – Sharadchandra Pawar; Dravida Munnetra Kazhagam; Rashtriya Janata Dal; Jharkhand Mukti Morcha; Jammu & Kashmir National Conference; Jammu and Kashmir Peoples Democratic Party; Maharashtra Navnirman Sena; Socialist Unity Centre of India (Communist); Sikkim Democratic Front; Tamilaga Vettri Kazhagam; Viduthalai Chiruthaigal Katchi; Marumalarchi Dravida Munnetra Kazhagam; Youth organizations; Cockroach Janta Party; All India Students' Association; Students' Federation of India; Others: Indian Youth Congress; National Students' Union of India; Democratic Youth Federation of India; All India Students' Federation; All India Youth Federation; Revolutionary Youth Association; Krantikari Yuva Sangathan (KYS); Progressive Students' Union; All India Students' Bloc; All India Democratic Students' Organisation; Trade unions: Centre of Indian Trade Unions; Samyukt Kisan Morcha; Bharatiya Kisan Union

Lead figures
Chief Election Commissioner of India; Gyanesh Kumar; President of India; Droupadi Murmu; Prime Minister of India; Narendra Modi; Union Home Minister; Amit Shah; Chief Justice of India; Surya Kant; Union Home Secretary; Govind Mohan; Lieutenant Governor of Delhi; Taranjit Singh Sandhu; Commissioner of Delhi Police; Anurag Kumar; Political figures: N. Chandrababu Naidu; Pema Khandu; Himanta Biswa Sarma; Samrat Choudhary; Vishnu Deo Sai; Pramod Sawant; Bhupendra Patel; Nayab Singh Saini; Mohan Yadav; Devendra Fadnavis; Yumnam Khemchand Singh; Conrad Sangma; Neiphiu Rio; Mohan Charan Majhi; Bhajan Lal Sharma; Prem Singh Tamang; Manik Saha; Yogi Adityanath; Pushkar Singh Dhami; Suvendu Adhikari; Rajnath Singh; Shivraj Singh Chouhan; Sudhanshu Trivedi; Sambit Patra; Ravi Shankar Prasad; Gaurav Bhatia	Opposition leaders; Rahul Gandhi; Mallikarjun Kharge; D. Raja; M. A. Baby; Arvind Kejriwal; Uddhav Thackeray; Mamata Banerjee; Others: V. D. Satheesan; D. K. Shivakumar; Revanth Reddy; Brinda Karat; John Brittas; Dipankar Bhattacharya; Akhilesh Yadav; Tejashwi Yadav; Sharad Pawar; Activists; Abhijeet Dipke; Saurav Das; Ashutosh Ranka; Ajinkya Shinde; Neha Bora; Others: Dhruv Rathee; Prakash Raj; Prashant Bhushan; Srijan Bhattacharyya; Aishe Ghosh; Adarsh M. Saji; A. A. Rahim; Himaghnaraj Bhattacharya; Uday Bhanu Chib; Viraaj Devang

Units involved
Security Forces: Central Armed Police Forces; Central Reserve Police Force; Rapid Action Force; CoBRA; Border Security Force; Central Industrial Security Force; Indo-Tibetan Border Police; Sashastra Seema Bal; Assam Rifles; National Security Guard; Delhi Police; State Police: Mumbai Police; Bengaluru City Police	Opposition-affiliated leaders and student organizations Unaffiliated protesters and youth and civil rights activists

Casualties
- Detained: More than 7,000 protesters detained

2026 anti-CEC protests are a series of protests in India starting from September 2026, demanding the resignation of Chief Election Commissioner, Gyanesh Kumar and changes to the Election Commission of India's (ECI) Special Intensive Revision (SIR), a process for revision and verification of voter rolls, as a result of the 2026 SIR/ECI controversy. The demonstrations have involved opposition parties belonging to the INDIA bloc, the youth-led Cockroach Janta Party (CJP), and student and civil-society groups. Protests have taken place in New Delhi, Mumbai, Chennai, and other cities.

The protests followed an exposé published by The Indian Express, reporting that two other election commissioners had dissented on 14 occasions against unilateral decisions undertaken by Kumar on behalf of the commission and in breach of election commissioners act, 2023, related to the implementation of the 2025-26 SIR, a process that was already under public scrutiny for alleged voter roll manipulation and mass disenfranchisement, and that they had submitted written dissent towards these several times prior. The ECI has maintained since that all key decisions regarding the SIR had been unanimously taken and that dissenting opinions did not constitute decision-making of the ECI. The ECI has since implemented several decisions to address several concerns raised in the dissent, in the Supreme court, and in public discourse.

== Background ==
Gyanesh Kumar, is the first chief election commissioner appointed through the controversial Chief Election Commissioner and Other Election Commissioners (Appointment, Conditions of Service and Term of Office) Act, 2023 in February 2025 with majority voting of the ruling BJP government, despite protest against the nomination by opposition leader, Rahul Gandhi, who was also a member of the selection panel.

The 2025–2026 Special Intensive Revision (SIR) of electoral rolls began with Bihar in June 2025 and was subsequently extended to other states. The exercise was intended to verify and update electoral rolls. Reports on the revisions published in September 2026 stated that more than 71% of the names deleted up to that point had been classified under the category "absent, shifted or others". The West Bengal SIR was a particularly contentious topic as its process differed from the prior SIRs, including introduction centrally appointed officers 'micro-observers' specific to West Bengal SIR that had veto powers over decisions of state level officers, and a newly introduced Logical Discrepancy category under which 17% of all voters' names were categorized for removal from voter rolls based on algorithms the commission has refused to publish. Many voters that were removed, despite the Supreme Court intervention in its SIR, were not able to vote in the West Bengal legislative assembly elections, but were included again after hearing of appeals since. Many organizations have analyzed the SIR data regarding if SIR played a role in BJP's victory beyond strong incumbency sentiments against the TMC on the grounds that the SIR disproportionately affected muslims, women and other minority members considered likely to vote TMC, and as SIR removals vastly exceeded victory margins in the state.

On 23 September 2026, journalist Ritika Chopra, published a series of investigative reports in the The Indian Express, which alleged internal dissent within the Election Commission of India (ECI) regarding its handling of Special Intensive Revisions (SIR), a process for revision and verification of voter rolls which was already under scrutiny for procedural flaws and administrative failures resulting in mass disenfranchisement of voters that were otherwise found eligible. The Indian Express exposé described at least 14 objections raised over 10 months by election commissioners Sukhbir Singh Sandhu and Vivek Joshi concerning decisions related to the SIR. According to the reporting, the objections concerned changes made to voter registration form without legal authorization, software integrity of recently introduced centralized software by the ECI which it connected to an incident of software error in Goa preventing eligible voters from appearing on the finalized voter roll, alleged filing of appeals against 2026 West Bengal SIR voter restoration that was undertaken by courts due to Supreme Court intervention, and concerns of centralization, transparency and protection of voter database.

Opposition parties have criticized SIR deletions as "vote theft", alleging that eligible voters had been excluded whereas the Election Commission of India and the ruling, Bharatiya Janata Party (BJP), have maintained that the exercise was intended to remove duplicate, deceased and otherwise ineligible entries.

The ECI responded that the commissioners' queries and suggestions concerned operational matters at the draft stage and formed part of normal administrative practice. It maintained that the final decisions relating to the SIR were taken unanimously and claimed that dissenting opinions do not constitute decision making of the body.

The Cockroach Janta Party (CJP) and opposition parties subsequently demanded Kumar's resignation and called for the cancellation or suspension of the SIR. Other demands included restoring electoral rolls predating the revision, an independent inquiry into the process, a return to paper-ballot voting and repeal of the 2023 appointment law. The Congress demanded Kumar's resignation, cancellation of the SIR and a return to paper ballots, while the CJP also called for a temporary suspension of upcoming elections and criminal proceedings against him. INDIA bloc, a major political alliance of opposition parties, demanded temporary suspension of SIR, no deletion of voters without notice and hearing, publication of details of deleted voters, disclosure of internal records and decision making of the ECI, independent audit of the SIR including software employed in the process, and proper recording of all decisions made in the SIR process.

The BJP has characterized the reporting as fabrications, the demonstrations as promoting anarchy, and has accused opposition parties of undermining autonomy of the ECI and democratic process, while opposition leaders and civic bodies have argued that the revision threatened voting rights and electoral fairness and that the BJP had curtailed their right to protest in Delhi.

== Overview ==
The Indian National Congress organised protests in several states demanding Kumar's resignation on 25 September; some demonstrators and party leaders also called for his arrest. Police used tear gas and water cannons in locations including Chandigarh, Chennai, Patna and Lucknow, while tear-gas shells were reported in Imphal. Demonstrators were detained in several states. In Assam, state Congress president Gaurav Gogoi was detained during a protest. Reuters reported demonstrations in at least a dozen states. Congress leader Rahul Gandhi accused the Commission of 'vote theft', while the BJP characterised the campaign as a reaction to electoral defeat. From 2 to 8 October, INDIA bloc alliance conducted a series of nationwide protests followed by a march to the Supreme Court for filing a petition. INDIA bloc also conducted a symbolic mock impeachment of Gyanesh Kumar on 31 Octoboer, in the style of Lok Sabha sessions precided by a former Lok Sabha speaker, alleging collusion with the BJP and voter roll manipulation followed by 'Dilli Chalo' rally at Ramlila Maidan.

The Cockroach Janta Party (CJP), gave Gyanesh 48 hours from 24 September, to resign as CEC and threatened nationwide protests starting from 2 October marking Gandhi Jayanti. Its demands included Gyanesh's resignation, criminal proceedings against him, a freeze on upcoming assembly elections and the rollback of the SIR. As demands remained unmet, the CJP organized the protests in recognition of Gandhi Jayanti, at Jantar Mantar, New Delhi, and Shivaji Park, Mumbai using a 'Jail Bharo Andolan' strategy where protestors let themselves be arrested, since permission to organize protests at both locations was denied by police authorities. On 8 October, CJP organised a demonstration at Freedom Park in Bengaluru, Karnataka with involvement of Abhijeet Dipke, co-conveners Ashutosh Ranka and Saurav Das, actor-activist Prakash Raj, digital commentator Dhruv Rathee and civil-society representatives. The event included a "People's Tribunal" where participants described alleged errors in electoral databases and exclusions from the rolls and a public "chappal protest", a protest involving footwear directed at effigies or posters of the ECI and the CEC. Following successful conduction of the protests, CJP announced a second phase of protests on 5 October, called "Jantar Mantar Protest 2.0", in reference to a different protest, starting from October 10 although permission to conduct protests there was not granted. The Delhi police invoked 168 BNSS for preventative policing and undertook several preventative measures including cancellation and rescheduling of trains bound to Delhi, closure of several Delhi metro stations, heavy barricading of the city, and also detaining key members of the protest before they could reach Jantar Mantar including 3 leading CJP members, major political figures participating in the protests and over 7,000 protestors who had assembled despite detention of key organizers.

The All India Students' Association (AISA) led a march in Delhi towards Jantar Mantar on 4 October, that was stopped by police barricades on Ashoka Road. Shiv Sena (UBT) and Maharashtra Navnirman Sena among other political parties, also organized a march in Mumbai demanding SIR to be scrapped and return to paper ballots, "Virat Garjana Morcha" from Metro Cinema to the Brihanmumbai Municipal Corporation headquarters in Mumbai attended by nearly 6000 people. The Hindu reported that nearly 500 people were detained on 4 October in Delhi, while other reporting gave a lower figure of approximately 110 for detentions associated with the day's clashes including AISA national president, Neha Bora. Reports also said that 12 to 15 police personnel were injured. Three women journalists filed FIR alleging sexual harassment by Delhi ACP, Vivek Bhagat in the protests, who were counter sued for discriminatory remarks under SC/ST act. The case is being examined in the Supreme court based on petition by Network for Women in Media and Delhi Union of Journalists. Following the incident, all senior police officers were directed to wear bodycams. On 11 October, Bora publicly announced protests at RK Ashram but instead marched towards Connaught Place leading to brief detainment of a look-alike. Bora received a show-cause notice requiring her to sign a peace bond on October 17. Bora claimed that it was a tactic to curb protests and challenged the order in court.

The Students' Federation of India and the All India United Students' Federation staged protests in Chennai, demanding the resignation or removal of Chief Election Commissioner Gyanesh Kumar. Around 150 people were detained, and a First Information Report (FIR) was registered in connection with the protests. Former Tamil Nadu Chief Minister M. K. Stalin criticised the arrests. The youth organisation Krantikari Yuva Sangathan (KYS) held a protest at the Red Fort, followed by another protest along the Yamuna river on 11 October. KYS activists described these locations as new sites of protest after being denied access to the streets. The organisation also staged a protest outside the Supreme Court of India, demanding action against the Delhi Police over the detention of peaceful protesters, which the protesters alleged violated the court's directions.

Due to ongoing festival season including Dussehra and Diwali, major protests were paused by the CJP and opposition parties for mid-October although some student organizations and civic bodies continued protests in limited capacity.

== Jantar Mantar 2.0 protest ==
On 5 October, CJP announced further demonstrations at Jantar Mantar on 10 October, referred to as "Jantar Mantar 2.0". The Delhi Police denied permission for the gathering citing late submission of request. According to reports by The Hindu, ahead of the proposed protest, police conducted overnight operations and detained people with criminal records. Authorities imposed extensive security restrictions in Delhi ahead of the protest by invoking 168 BNSS for preventative measures against cognizable offense, including the closure of 45 metro stations, restrictions on mobile internet services in parts of central Delhi, cancellation and rescheduling of over 200 trains, barricades and the deployment of over 20,000 police and paramilitary personnel.

On 10 October, police prevented demonstrators from assembling at Jantar Mantar and detained thousands of people across Delhi. Police figures reported 2,500 protestors detained whereas media reports claimed 7,000 - 15,000 detained. Some protesters held smaller demonstrations at other locations in the capital after police blocked access to the planned venue. Notable figures among those detained were CJP leaders Abhijeet Dipke, Saurav Das and Ashutosh Ranka, and its allies Dhruv Rathee and Neha Bora. Major political figures were also detained during the protest, including, Arvind Kejriwal, Pinarayi Vijayan, Manik Sarkar, Mamata Banerjee, Atishi Marlena, Brinda Karat and John Brittas. Most detainees were released the same day. Protestors were boarded on bus and sent to various stadiums in Delhi for processing detention. Restrictions on train and metro were removed following a Supreme Court order on the following day. The Delhi Police filed at least ten First Information Reports (FIRs) and detained five people linked to counter-protest assaults and harassment of protesters.

The leading members of CJP, Abhijeet Dipke, Saurav Das and Ashutosh Ranka, were released from detention on 11 October under surety bond of ₹50,000 for peaceful conduct following which CJP decided to march to the Parliamentary street police station on 12 October for seeking a date for conducting protests while other organizations attempted continuing protests. Hours after CJP submitted its request, Jantar Mantar was denotified as protest site and three alternative protest sites were notified — Ramlila Maidan, CBD Ground and Burari Ground.

On 13 October 2026, CJP members, Das and Ranka along with 12 other party members, climbed past locked gates and barricades into Jantar Mantar and waved the national flag chanting slogans demanding CEC Gyanesh Kumar's resignation in defiance of denotification of Jantar Mantar as protest site. They were shortly detained again and sent to five days of judicial custody in Tihar Jail, following FIRs for trespassing, disobedience of official orders and obstruction of police personnel on duty. The CJP denounced their arrest and announced 'Lehra Do Tiranga' lit. 'Fly the tricolour flag' protest on 16 October for waving the national flag at Central Park, where Dipke was briefly detained and released upon signing a second bond. Both Das and Ranka were released on October 21, 2026 as their detention was extended, after they submitted an undertaking that they would not call for any protests at Jantar Mantar until it remains a denotified protest site, of maintaining peaceful conduct, and of "upholding faith" in judiciary system.

== INDIA Bloc Protests ==
From 2 to 8 October, the INDIA bloc conducted a series of protests, 'Save Democracy campaign' including district-level marches and spot protests in several locations including Delhi EC office, Akashvani Bhavan, Rajghat and Windsor Place in Delhi. Several members including, opposition leader Rahul Gandhi, were briefly detained during the protests.

On 9 October, a 10-member delegation from INDIA bloc composed of Mallikarjun Kharge, Rahul Gandhi, Mamata Banerjee, Omar Abdullah, Supriya Sule, M. A. Baby, D.Raja, Manoj Jha, Thol. Thirumavalavan and Rajeev Rai, met with the President, Droupadi Murmu to discuss allegations against Kumar. On 12 October, INDIA Bloc organized a march towards Supreme Court and filed a petition seeking a pause on SIR and pressing chagrges against the CEC, Gyanesh Kumar and was also supported by various student bodies.

On 31 October, INDIA bloc held a 'symbolic public impeachment' of Gyanesh Kumar, replicating a Lok Sabha setting at congress preseident Mallikarjun Kharge's residence presided by former speaker Meira Kumar, on six charges including alleged collusion with the ruling BJP government to influence election results in relation to West Bengal elections, deletion of 133 million voter names from SIR, illegal modification of form-6, centralized manipulation of electoral duties through ECINET software, and alleged partisan conduct of the commission in line with Narendra Modi and Amit Shah. It also conducted 'Chalo Dilli' rally at Ramlila Maidan the following day, one of the three protest sites allowed in Delhi, including a march from Central Delhi to the protest site and addressing the public.

== Reactions ==
The protests drew criticism from 42 former judges, they described the campaign against Chief Election Commissioner Gyanesh Kumar as an attempt to undermine constitutional institutions. Various BJP members, including Chief ministers Devendra Fadnavis, Suvendu Adhikari, Mohan Yadav and Pushkar Dhami, claimed The Indian Express expose as fabrications. Other members countered with election conduct under Congress. Several BJP figures, including union ministers Kiren Rijiju and Sukanta Majumdar, have accused the protests of being organized with funding by George Soros, alleging that the protests were intended to bring about regime change outside the electoral process, and to destabilise the country. The BJP has also accused the protests of disruption of trade activity in Delhi as some were conducted without permission from the Delhi police. Senior advocate Prashant Bhushan also said that the movement had become a struggle for regime change and described a change of government as a democratic right. AISA leader Neha Bora also referred to Bangladesh's youth-led movement as an inspiration for democratic and voting rights activism. Various opposition figures have also maintained that a change of government should occur through elections. The BJP has held counter-protest, "Loktantra Bachao, Arajakta Hatao", alleging the opposition and civil groups seeking removal of Gyanesh Kumar to be against democracy. In Uttar Pradesh, the Yogi Adityanath-led BJP government amended rules for background verification for government employees to exclude members involved in "violent activities or activities aimed at changing the existing system" from government jobs although it also clarified that members will not be excluded on grounds of political ideology alone.

Misconduct during protest by policing authority is also another widely criticized subject. A group of more than twenty United Nations human rights experts issued a joint statement in Geneva that brought attention to the situation on a global scale. The statement called for independent judicial oversight and expressed grave concerns about reports of gender-based abuse in the protests, detentions, arbitrary arrests, and excessive force. The UN panel's conclusions were categorically rejected by India's Ministry of External Affairs, which criticized the experts for using unsubstantiated claims to create a "selective targeting" narrative against Indian democratic institutions and described the remarks as an unjustified meddling in domestic constitutional matters. On 10 October protests, the United Nations human rights office expressed concern about the detentions and called for respect for peaceful assembly. India rejected the criticism as interference in its internal affairs and said that peaceful assembly was constitutionally protected, subject to lawful restrictions.

Various protestors had raised allegations of sexual harassment by police authority, which opposition members denounced and Rahul Gandhi also extended litigation support for members affected. A coalition of left-wing civil rights groups, including the National Federation of Indian Women (NFIW) and the All India Democratic Women's Association (AIDWA), marched to the Delhi Police Headquarters on 17 October 2026, and delivered a formal memorandum calling for the immediate suspension and prosecution of officers implicated in the alleged physical and sexual assaults.

== See also ==
- Electronic voting in India
- 2026 Delhi Jantar Mantar protests
- Gen Z protests in Asia
