= 2026 Indian electoral controversy =

Controversy about decision-making process in India's electoral body

2026 ECI SIR controversy
- Part of Special Intensive Revision (SIR)
- Date: 23 September 2026 - present
- Also known as: 2026 SIR/CEC row
- Type: Democracy in India
- Cause: Administrative failures and procedural flaws in 2025-26 Special Intensive Revision exercise; Allegations of partisan conduct by the Election Commission in mass disenfranchisement of eligible voters; Allegations of internal dissent within the Election Commission against decisions undertaken by Chief Election Commissioner, Gyanesh Kumar
- Motive: Alleged electoral roll manipulation benefiting the Bharatiya Janata Party
- Outcome: Removal of 130 million names from India's electoral rolls, Supreme Court cases and intervention in SIR process, and 2026 anti-CEC protests
- Involved: Election Commission of India; Supreme Court of India; Bharatiya Janata Party; Opposition parties and civil-society groups

The 2026 ECI SIR controversy, or SIR/CEC row, refers to controversy surrounding the Election Commission of India (ECI) and its conduction of Special Intensive Revisions (SIR), a process for revision and verification of voter rolls, for procedural flaws and administrative failures resulting in mass disenfranchisement of voters that were otherwise found eligible. It gained significant coverage following a series of investigative reports by journalist Ritika Chopra, published in the The Indian Express on 23 September 2026, alleging internal dissent in the commission against alleged unilateral decision-making by the Chief Election Commissioner of India (CEC), Gyanesh Kumar, in breach of 2023 election commissioners act.

The report alleges that election commissioners, Sukhbir Singh Sandhu and Vivek Joshi, were not informed of several decisions passed by the CEC regarding the SIR process and that they had submitted written dissent towards these decisions at least 14 times in the 10 months prior, including against changes made to voter registration form without legal authority to do so, software integrity of recently introduced centralized software by the ECI, alleged filing of appeals against 2026 West Bengal SIR voter restoration following judicial intervention of the process, and concerns of centralization, transparency and protection of voter database. In response, the Election Commission issued a statement on the same day that all key decisions of the commission had been taken unanimously and later described some of the objections as suggestions.

On September 26, the ECI announced that it will adopt mandatory meetings for introduction of all new initiatives and IT modules in its policy, and introduced several directions, passed in unanimous agreement of the commissioners, to address various concerns raised in the SIR process and in the public discourse. The ECI also announced a 'special drive' for enrollment of voters excluded in SIR which it announced later to be conducted through its Special Summary Revision (SSR) routine wherein the ECI incrementally updates its electoral rolls, and 'special camps' for states with on-going SIR.

The controversy has become a political flashpoint, with opposition parties and various organizations demanding resignation of Gyanesh Kumar as CEC with criminal proceedings against him, repeal of 2023 election commissioners act through which the ruling government had majority vote in his appointment, annulment of SIR, halting of elections and reinstatement of January 2025 voter list prior to the SIR, and reforms to election commission. The allegations have also resulted in an ongoing Supreme Court plea and widespread anti-CEC protests in the country, calling for removal of Gyanesh Kumar as CEC.

== Background ==
=== 2023 Election commissioners act ===
Election commissioners (EC) are members of the Election Commission of India (ECI), appointed by the President of India, tasked with overseeing conduct of elections within the country. In 1993, since the ECI permanently changed to a three body panel, an amendment to the election commissioners act, 1991 set the precedent that the chief election commissioner shared equal power with other election commissioners, although asymmetry exists in termination process, and required decisions to be passed unanimously, or failing which, through majority vote.

In May 2023, the Supreme Court concluded a PIL hearing alleging that selection of ECI members by the President effectively based on recommendation by the Prime Minister undermined transparency of elections and that it was unconstitutional as the concerning Article 324 of the Constitution expected legislation for the selection process which was not in place. The Supreme court issued an interim direction of formation of a selection committee consisting of the Prime Minister of India, the Chief Justice of India, and the Leader of the Opposition in the Lok Sabha, for the recommendation of ECI members to the President until a legislation was issued prescribing the selection process.

The Chief Election Commissioner and other Election Commissioners (Appointment, Conditions of Service and Term of Office) Act, 2023 (2023 election commissioners Act) was passed in December 2023 to address this issue, but it controversially replaced the Chief Justice of India with a Union Minister, thereby giving the ruling government a dominant role in the appointment of election commissioners. Gyanesh Kumar became the first CEC appointed through the selection committee in February 2025, consisting of the Prime Minister, Narendra Modi, Home Minister, Amit Shah and Leader of Opposition, Rahul Gandhi although he refused to vote any nomination and recommended pausing the meeting till the a PIL challenging the 2023 act was concluded in the Supreme Court.

Section 16 of the act provides legal immunity to CEC against civil or criminal proceedings for acts done in discharge of their official functions, which is considered unprecedented as Judges and also the Prime Minister of India do not have similar provisions. Constitutionality of the legal immunity was being examined by the Supreme Court following a PIL in January 2026. The act also sets removal of CEC as equivalent to that of supreme court judges, that is by address supported by majority of Rajya Sabha and Lok Sabha and two third majority of voting members while the other ECs can be removed by recommendation of the CEC which is criticized for making dissent within the ECI structurally risky where it otherwise sets equal power to the commissioners. Under section 18 of the act, the ECI is also required to take decisions under unanimity or failing which, through majority vote, retained from the previous legislation.

The 2023 election commissioners act also does not engage with internal working of the ECI, due to which the ECI followed no dissent protocol, which is criticized as an unaddressed issue. For example, in 2019, election commissioner, Ashok Lavasa, had boycotted ECI meetings claiming that dissent notes not being recorded in orders undermined transparency of the commission. As of September 2026, the 2023 election commissioners act was being examined by the Supreme Court for nullifying guardrails prescribed by the interim order.

=== Special Intensive Revisions process ===
Special Intensive Revisions (SIR), is a process undertaken by the ECI under article 324 and section 21 of Representation of People Act, 1950, to verify and revise electoral rolls by eliminating names of deceased, permanently shifted, duplicate and ineligible voters based on document submission and house-to-house verification. The ECI otherwise maintains the voter rolls by incrementally adding new voters and removing shifted or deceased voters under Special Summary Revision (SSR) exercise, which is conducted annually and before every Lok Sabha or Assembly elections.

In June 2025, the 2025–26 exercise of SIR was announced which is the ninth SIR since the last such exercise conducted in 2002–05. It is conducted by freezing reference roll, mandatory enumeration form submission, house-to-house verification by Booth Level Operators (BLOs), publication of draft rolls, hearings with Electoral Registration Officers (EROs) for claims for inclusion (form-6), objections to inclusion (form-7), or corrections (form-8), and issuing of the final roll. All the forms used in EROs hearing are statuary forms that are prescribed by Registration of Electors Rules, 1960, and cannot be changed without amendment to the rules. Under section 31 of Representation of People Act, false declarations in the forms is a punishable offense.

Due to the SIR process, the SSR process was put on hold, due to objection of CEC alone for seeking legal clarity according to The Economic Times, and new voters were being registered through the SIR process. Form-6 is the prescribed form for application of new voters but was also used for deleted users seeking inclusion in the SIR, despite the form containing a mandatory declaration that the signatory member is seeking inclusion in voter rolls for the first time. Deleted voters in SIRs were permitted to use form-8 for data correction instead on November 2026, after conclusion of a PIL hearing. Unlike SSR, voters not included in the previous SIR were required to submit documents for eligibility including proof of citizenship, excluding voters 'mapped' by relation to citizen appearing in previous SIR rolls since the second phase. Starting from the second phase, Form-6 also contained a declaration requiring details of parents' or grandparents' status in 2002-05 SIR, that was mandatory for online submissions. The SIR process also did not limit the number of physical form-7 submissions regarding objections to voter inclusion, filed by an individual and various states have flagged concern of bulk form-7 submissions in the SIR process.

The ECI also introduced 'logical discrepancies' (LD), including different categories in the SIR process under which spelling variations, age/relationship mismatches or errors in residence for mapped members is flagged for review through ERO hearings. The process involved digitization of forms and legacy SIR rolls through OCR and transliteration to English, and identification of discrepancies through algorithms, that have malfunctioned on different occasions. The ECI has not published contract details, specifications, threshold, impact assessment or audit of the algorithms used, and has also maintained secrecy of algorithm, safeguards and workflow from RTI request. It also claimed that no new software was developed or procured for the SIR and that ERO are responsible for the same. Reports indicate that flagging of names was facilitated through its recently deployed centralized software, ECINET, that also unified 40 different applications and websites. ECINET was reported to have various problems, including auto-generating discrepancies on behalf of EROs and BLOs for review, centralized blocking of voter tools or access to platform for state level officers, no publicly available information on algorithms used in the process, and existence of voters marked "VIP" which was allegedly used to prevent public figures from being flagged. Legality of LD category has been raised in the Supreme Court, and it clarified that while it upheld the category in West Bengal with an interim court intervention of the process, it has not examined methodology of the process.

== Special Intensive Revisions controversies ==
The West Bengal SIR, affecting the state of West Bengal considered poll-bound by both the ruling Trinamool Congress (TMC) and the BJP, was particularly contentious among the 13 prior SIRs that were conducted, since its SIR process deviates from the preceding SIRs. The ECI decided to appoint central government employees, "micro-observers" specific to the West Bengal SIR, to supervise ERO hearings with veto powers over state nominated ERO's decisions and introduced 'logical discrepancy' category in the SIR, flagged by a newly introduced algorithm that had not been documented previously or made public since. ECINET also had the capability of auto-generating discrepancy reports for review by officials through its module, ERONET, which had been reported as causing heavy burden of work for officials in SIRs if these were to be individually reviewed. The ECI is alleged to have auto-generated reports of logical discrepancies on behalf of EROs for review and has been attributed to large number of people being marked with logical discrepancy, including 17% of all voters in West Bengal SIR and 41% of all voters in Madhya Pradesh. The ERO hearings in West Bengal had to be paused in one instance, due to errors in the algorithms used for flagging logical discrepancies.

Trinamool Congress raised various concerns in the process employed for SIR in a plea hearing in the Supreme Court. Recognizing this as "trust deficit" between the state and the ECI, the Supreme court transferred adjudication process to the judiciary, placing a selection of judicial officers responsible for finalizing the electoral roll. The judicial officers cleared 3.3 million out of 6 million electors under adjudication, leaving out 2.7 million people. The courts received 2.2 million appeals for inclusion or 82% of deleted names and 1.6 million appeals against voter inclusion. The Supreme Court ordered publishing of "supplementary revised electoral roll" containing voters cleared by the appeals for eligibility in Legislative assembly election in April 2026, only two days in advance of polling dates. However, it consisted of only 1,607 members out of 2,131 appeals it successfully processed, leading to exclusion of most of the names flagged with logical discrepancy from the elections without a hearing of appeal. Following BJP victory in the Legislative Assembly election, various organizations have analyzed SIR and election data on whether SIR process played a significant role in the results besides strong incumbency sentiments against the ruling TMC government, on the grounds that SIR removal pattern disproportionately affected Muslim and minority populations and that deleted voters under appeal process vastly exceeded victory margins. As of September 2026, 3.7 million out of the 3.8 million total appeals had remained pending, wherein the appellate courts, prioritizing hearings of claims of inclusion, had restored voters in over 90% of the concluded hearings.

In Goa SIR, technical issue of ECINET prevented EROs from adding 97 voters that were found to be eligible. Since the EROs and also the chief electoral officers (CEOs) of the state do not have complete access to the portal, its CEO reached out to the ECI requesting approval of changes on eight different occasions but did not receive a response, resulting in omission of all 97 voters from the final roll. A public code audit by Charchagram on the officials' ECINET portal revealed that the commission could remotely block certain voter tools to particular states, as was found to be used in West Bengal, or state-level officers' access to ECINET, effectively preventing them from making any changes. It also reported on the existence of "VIP" voters, also found in the software stack used by BLOs by The Reporters' Collective, allegedly used to ensure that high profile members are not flagged in the system to avoid publicity.

The SIR exercise also did not limit the number of applications of form-7, objections to voter inclusion, and individuals filing objections were allegedly not required to attend ERO hearings. Several states in SIR have raised concerns about bulk filing of form-7 including West Bengal, Rajasthan, Gujarat, Telangana and Karnataka. The ERONET module of ECINET, was also capable of auto-generating form-7 for submission by BLOs or EROs, which is alleged to have been used in Uttar Pradesh and Telangana. Mass submission of form-6 for new voter submissions prior to elections has been alleged by political parties to be election interference by members from different jurisdiction, during and also prior to the SIR such as in 'vote chori' allegations, although definitive objections have not been raised in court by any parties involved.

As of September 2026, the SIR had removed 130 million names from voter rolls, of which 95 million or 71% under 'absent shifted or others' category, 27 million under deceased category and 10 million as duplicate entries.

== Dissent allegations ==
On 23 September 2026, a series of investigative reports by journalist Ritika Chopra was published in The Indian Express, highlighting that two of the three Election commissioners, Sukhbir Singh Sandhu and Vivek Joshi, claimed that the CEC, Gyanesh Kumar allegedly issued orders without their knowledge in violation of 2023 election commissioners act which requires unanimous or majority support for decisions of the body, and that they had formally objected to such decisions 14 times in 10 months during which the ECI held meetings irregularly. Both the commissioners had objections regarding:

- Orders, letters and other communications issued in ECI's name without commission's approval
- Centralization of voter database without audit including issues caused due to ECINET technical problems
- Work reallocation within the ECI without prior notification to the commission including issues in work roster and removal of IT division oversight
- Changes in online Form-6 mandating declaration of parents' and grandparents' standing in the previous SIR conducted in 2002-05 SIR without amendment to the Registration of Electors Rules, 1960

while other concerns raised by the commissioners, are:

- Officials on foreign trips without commission's approval, as raised by Joshi
- No meeting agenda or minutes of meeting used for commission's meetings, as raised by Joshi
- IT modules and portals announced without prior notification to the commission, as raised by Sandhu
- Mass appeals allegedly issued under ECI's name, against restoration of 1.6 million voter names in 2026 West Bengal SIR process approved through Supreme Court intervention of ECI's original decision of removing 6 million names, raised by Sandhu

The report also linked objections relating to its centralized software to software integrity issues of recently introduced ECINet whose technical difficulties and lack of communication from the ECI had excluded 97 eligible voters in Goa from the voter rolls and highlighted its capability to remotely curtail powers of a field officer. The report claims that meetings were irregular, and that the two commissioners had written a letter to the Chief Secretary, who holds the highest rank in Indian bureaucracy which the ECI. The dissented work reallocation order passed in the ECI was eventually struck down by the commissioners.

== ECI response ==
In response to the dissent allegations, the Election Commission issued a clarification on the same day as the report, that all key decisions of the commission have been taken unanimously and described objections as suggestions that are normal part of its deliberations.

On 26 September, the ECI announced several decisions in unanimous agreement, addressing concerns raised by the two Election Commissioners after a meeting

- All new initiative and IT modules will be discussed in Committee of Officers before approval with meeting agendas and minutes of meeting
- Foreign travel by commissioners will require the Commission's approval
- ECINET will be reviewed by an panel formed by Deputy Election Commissioners, a director, four chief electoral officers and two independent experts from IIT Bombay and IISc
- Under revised SIR process 'unmapped' voters with discrepancies will not be required to appear before Electoral registration officer (ERO)
- Deadlines for filing claims and objections in Delhi and Maharashtra are extended
- Booth-level operators (BLO) will visit homes of individuals affected by ECINet portal for document collection in reference to Goa SIR
- Dissented work reallocation was issued on 28 July by Deputy Election Commissioner (DEC), Maneesh Garg which was struck down by commissioners and never implemented as a result. The ECI also claimed that the two dissenting commissioners had written to the Chief Secretary regarding unilateral decision of the DEC. On November 4, the ECI issued an order for oversight over its IT division through a senior DEC official. The ECI has maintained that IT oversight was "never actually withdrawn."
- 'Special drive' for enrollment of any members excluded by the SIR and first time voters, which it later announced will be facilitated by resuming SSR process in states and UT having completed SIR process and mandated providing machine readable voter list for any political party requesting it, which had been demanded by Congress since 2018 and was a major obstacle in its 'vote chori' allegations
- Form-6 declaration will remain in effect as it claimed to have been upheld in the Supreme Court. The Supreme Court stated following the announcement that it had not approved or examined any changes to form-6 to which the ECI responded that form-6 itself had remained unmodified but had an additional declaration attached to it. In response to the subsequent supreme court proceedings examining dissent, the ECI admitted that the online form suggest changes without amendment and split form-6 and its declarations from 21 October. It also withdrew the declaration form in states having concluded SIR where mapping of voters is not required. On 6 November, states with ongoing SIRs also permitted deleted voters to reapply for inclusion using form 8 for data correction, rather than applying form 6 for fresh application and recommended no action against previous applicants that were forced to declare themself to be first time seeking inclusion on form-6.

On 10 October, the ECI acknowledged bulk filing of form-7 against voter inclusion in the electoral rolls, prescribed limits on the number of physical form-7 for individuals to 10 which was previously unlimited, recommended criminal prosecution for false declarations in form-7, and reiterated that EROs are required, according to Registration of Electors Rules, to hear from objectors on every individual claim personally, which West Bengal had claimed was not followed during its SIR. On 9 November, the ECI extended Moral Code of Conduct restrictions to various retired officers and government employees to ensure political neutrality in election process.

== Supreme court proceedings ==
On 26 October, the election commission responded to a Supreme Court petition seeking restraining of the CEC on the grounds of alleged unilateral decision making with a counter-affidavit that:

- All decisions regarding SIR was unanimous although some of the reported objections were suggestions and notes that did not constitute decisions of the ECI, and claimed that it will take responsibility of rectifying any unauthorized communication if identified
- ECI denied the need for the court to acquire evidence for investigation as it claimed the petition was based on a single newspaper report and had been filed without any attempt to independently establish facts from the commission first and requested scrutiny of the petition itself
- Declaration attachment to form-6 was 'separate' from form-6 although it admitted that the online version of form-6 which also mandated submission of the declaration appeared to indicate changes to form-6 without amendment to the rules and prescribed that form be separated into two effective from 21 October
- Dissented work reallocation issued by the deputy election commissioner was not implemented as the election commissioners had struck it down
- The West Bengal bulk appeals against voter inclusion were filed by Electoral Registration Officers (EROs) without notice to the commission
- The ECI had addressed all issues discussed in public discourse and raised by the article, including review of ECINET by a committee to check compliance with applicable laws as well as an independent panel formed by members from IIT-B and IISc although the commission has maintained secrecy of its algorithms in response to a recent RTI request, and reinstating Goa voters found eligible.

The ECI sought more time to submit a detailed response citing Dussehra vacations, and added that any plea requesting restraining of the CEC would not be maintainable and that the CEC was required to uphold unilateral decision making as prescribed by the 2023 act. The Print reports that the ECI had submitted a single affidavit by Deputy Election Commissioner, Bhanu Prakash Yeturu, on behalf of the ECI with unanimous approval of the commissioners, despite the Supreme Court seeking individual affidavits from the CEC and ECs.

== Protests ==
Cockroach Janata Party, a satirical political movement, accused Gyanesh Kumar of undermining the electoral process and threatened to start a series of protests if he did not resign before 2 October, marking Gandhi Jayanti. CJP demanded Gyanesh Kumar's resignation with criminal proceedings against him, immediate freezing of SIR process and reinstatement of January 2025 voter list prior to the SIR, repeal of 2023 election commissioners act on appointment of commissioners through which Gyanesh Kumar was appointed, and reforms in election commission. Indian National Congress also demanded resignation of Gyanesh Kumar, annulment of SIR and conduction of elections on ballot paper. INDIA bloc, a major political alliance of opposition parties, demanded temporary suspension of SIR, no deletion of voters without notice and hearing, publication of details of deleted voters, disclosure of internal records and decision making of the ECI, independent audit of the SIR including software employed in the process, and proper recording of all decisions made in the SIR process. Various academics, journalists, lawyers, artists and activists have also written in support of suspending SIR process.

Various organizations including CJP, AISA, NSUI and DYFI, and opposition parties, such as INC, AAP, MAITC and CPI(M), participated in protests across the country against the various decisions undertaken by the ECI in the SIR process.

== Reactions ==
Supreme Court Judge, Joymalya Bagchi questioned removal of large number of voters in West Bengal, as it had 2% winning margin but had removed 15% voters and remarked that margin of error could affect election results. Following BJP victory of West Bengal Legislative Assembly elections after its SIR, various organizations have analyzed SIR and election data based on SIR removal pattern disproportionately affected Muslim and minority populations and deleted voters under appeal process vastly exceeding victory margins. Although incumbency sentiment against the TMC is considered to have a substantial role in its loss of elections, analysis of SIR data by The Scroll, Newslaundry, The Print, and Civic Research Group, suggest that SIR could have also played a significant role whereas analysis by The Times of India, found the evidence to be inconclusive and analysis by Hindustan Times, concluded negative. A similar issue has been raised by the BJP government in Uttar Pradesh since the controversy, regarding exclusion of Hindu voters.

Several commentators and journalists have also critiqued the Supreme Court's handling of the SIR as many of its elements, including execution by the ECI, were challenged. Three United Nations special rapporteurs had flagged multiple issues in the SIR in May 2026, including use of opaque AI driven systems, weak grounds for deletion of voters for natural variations in English spellings of names, inadequate time for voters document submission and objections, and "notable exclusion of minorities" through the process while the Government responded that SIR was conducted lawfully without prejudice and that the Supreme Court had upheld ECI's right to conduct SIR.

Following The Indian Express expose, both ECI and the BJP maintained that objections were normal and that the report was misleading or false whereas opposition parties and other civil organizations accused the ECI of conducting SIR arbitrarily, undermining the nation's democratic process and called for reversal of SIR and criminal prosecution against CEC, with some members also accusing the CEC of colluding with the BJP.

== See also ==
- 2025 Indian electoral controversy
- 2026 Anti-CEC protests
- 2026 West Bengal election controversies
- National Register of Citizens for Assam
- 2026 NEET scandal
- 2026 CBSE On-Screen Marking controversy
