= Model Code of Conduct =

Guidelines for political campaigning in India

The Model Code of Conduct is a set of guidelines issued by the Election Commission of India for the conduct of political parties and candidates during elections. It is a set of norms which deal with matters including meetings, processions, election manifestos, polling and general conduct. It has evolved with the consensus of political parties and helps to ensure the conduct of free and fair elections. The Model Code of Conduct comes into force immediately on the announcement of the election schedule and remains in force till the end of the electoral process.

== History ==
The birth of the Model Code of Conduct dates back to the Assembly elections of Kerala in 1960, during which the State administration drafted a 'Code of Conduct' for political actors. It was subsequently circulated by the Election Commission of India to all recognised political parties and State governments during the Lok Sabha elections of 1962, and it was wholeheartedly followed. It was the year 1991 when the Election Commission decided to make more stringent use of the Model Code of Conduct following repeated election norms violations and continued corruption.

== Structure and features ==
The model code of conduct consists of seven sections which deal with general conduct, meetings, processions, party in power, polling booth, polling day and election manifestos.

General conduct

The section deals with general set of guidelines to be followed by the parties and candidates during the election process. It prohibits any discrimination, speeches or any references based on religion and refrains candidates or parties from criticizing others based on their personal private life or unsubstantiated allegations. The section bans all activities against law such as bribing, intimidation, impersonation etc. Parties shall also not create disturbances to other parties or candidates while campaigning.

Meetings

The section deals with the conduct of meetings. Meetings shall be conducted with prior permission from law enforcement agencies. It directs that any such guidelines and rules laid down by the law enforcement agencies shall be adhered to and permissions obtained from other governmental agencies if required such as for the use of loud speakers.

Procession

Processions organized by political parties shall be conducted with requisite permissions after communication of the required details such as time and place. The parties shall adhere to the plan approved and should not cause any hindrance to traffic or general public. It also bans the usage of undesirable articles and elements and activities such as burning of effigies by people participating in the processions.

Polling day

The section deals with general set of guidelines to be followed by the parties and candidates during the polling day. Political parties and candidates are expected to co-operate with the officials to ensure fair and free conduct of elections. It refrains parties from disturbing the votes or polling process and bans the usage of party symbols, propaganda material and liquor near the polling booths.

Polling Booth

Any grievances shall be taken up only with the observer appointed by the Election Commission.

Party in Power

The government or its constituents shall not exert influence on the election process. It also prescribes that official work and campaigning shall be kept separate and no official machinery should be used for campaigning. It also prohibits government from spending public money for propaganda. No schemes or grants should be launched by ministers directly or indirectly through authorities and no appointments/changes shall be made with respect to government personnel with a view to exert undue influence.

Election Manifestos

The manifesto shall not contain any promises construed as against the law and the constitution. It also prohibits the release of manifestations in the period prescribed by the Election Commission.

== See also ==
- 2025 Indian electoral controversy
- 2026 Indian electoral controversy
- 2026 anti-CEC protests
