= Gyanesh Kumar =

26th Chief Election Commissioner of India

Chief Election Commissioner of India
- Incumbent
- Assumed office 19 February 2025
- Appointed by: Droupadi Murmu
- Preceded by: Rajiv Kumar

Election Commissioner of India
- In office 14 March 2024 – 18 February 2025 Serving with Sukhbir Singh Sandhu
- Chief Election Commissioner: Rajiv Kumar
- Preceded by: Anup Chandra Pandey
- Succeeded by: Vivek Joshi

Cooperation Secretary of India
- In office 3 May 2022 – 31 January 2024
- Minister: Amit Shah
- Preceded by: Devendra Kumar Singh
- Succeeded by: Ashish Kumar Bhutani

Parliamentary Affairs Secretary of India
- In office 1 May 2021 – 2 May 2022
- Minister: Prahlad Joshi
- Preceded by: R. S. Shukla
- Succeeded by: Gudey Srinivas

Personal details
- Born: 27 January 1964 (age 62) Agra, Uttar Pradesh, India
- Education: IIT Kanpur (BTech); Institute of Chartered Financial Analysts of India; Harvard University

Gyanesh Kumar (born 27 January 1964) is a former IAS officer who currently serves as the Chief Election Commissioner of India since 19 February 2025.

He came under scrutiny during 2026 ECI SIR controversy, for allegedly undertaking unilateral decisions in the Election Commission of India (ECI) as the Chief Election Commissioner (CEC) during the 2025-26 Special Intensive Revision (SIR) exercise against established norms by the Chief Election Commissioner Act 2023, administrative failures in the SIR process resulting in mass disenfranchisement, and alleged electoral fraud in collusion with the ruling Bharatiya Janata Party (BJP). The controversy has lead to nationwide 'anti-CEC' protests by major opposition parties and civic organizations demanding criminal prosecution and resignation.

== Early life and education ==
Gyanesh Kumar was born in Agra, Uttar Pradesh. He completed his BTech in Civil Engineering from IIT Kanpur. Following his graduation, Kumar pursued Business Finance at the Institute of Chartered Financial Analysts of India, before studying Environmental Economics at Harvard University. In November 2025, Gyanesh Kumar, also received the Distinguished Alumnus Award (DAA) from the Indian Institutes of Technology (IIT) Kanpur.

== Early career ==
Kumar is a former Indian Administrative Service (IAS) officer of the 1988 Kerala cadre. He started his career as an Assistant Collector (U/T) in Ernakulam and later served as Sub-Collector of Adoor. He also served as the Secretary, Public Works Department of the Kerala Government. He served as Joint Secretary in the Department of Defence production at the Ministry of Defence from 2007 to 2012. He then served as Secretary in the Ministry of Parliamentary Affairs and the Ministry of Co-operation.

Kumar was involved in the drafting of the Jammu and Kashmir Reorganisation Act, which revoked the special autonomous status granted to Jammu and Kashmir in 1947. In January 2020, Kumar was assigned to the Ministry of Home Affairs, wherein he was involved in the establishment of the Shri Ram Janmbhoomi Teerth Kshetra, the organisation overseeing the construction and management of the Ram Mandir at the site of the demolished Babri Masjid. Following his retirement, Kumar was appointed as the Election Commisionser in March 2024 along with Sukhbir Singh Sandhu.

== Kerala State Transport Project controversy ==
Lee Been Seen, a Malaysian official in charge of the Kerala operations of PATI-BEL, a joint road project by Malaysian firm PATI and Bhageeratha Constructions, died by suicide on November 2006. Kumar was serving as secretary of the Kerala Public Works Department (PWD) during the time and was named in the note. The note blamed the PWD and government officials for harassment and delayed payments and land acquisition, the latter allegedly driving him to suicide. The note blamed the PWD and government officials for harassment and delayed payments and land acquisition, the latter allegedly driving him to suicide.

A Vigilance inquiry was ordered by the Kerala government. Kumar was moved out the PWD at the end of 2006 to the Union defence ministry.

The probe was reopened in October 2026 by the Kerala government.

== Chief Election Commissioner of India ==
On 19 February 2025, Gyanesh Kumar was appointed as the Chief Election Commissioner of India and was the first Chief Election Commissioner to be appointed through the Chief Election Commissioner Act 2023 which stipulated a selection committee consisting of Prime Minister Narendra Modi, Union Home Minister Amit Shah, and Leader of the Opposition Rahul Gandhi, despite Gandhi abstaining from the selection as a challenge to the constitutional alignment of the act was being heard in the Supreme Court. Under the amended rules, the Union Minister replaced the Chief Justice of India on the committee. He has previously served as an election commissioner and as a Cooperation Secretary. Kumar also assumed charge as the Chairman of the Council of Member States of the International Institute for Democracy and Electoral Assistance (International IDEA) for the year 2026, a body composed of 37 democratic nations.

=== 2025 Vote chori controversy ===
In August 2025, Gyanesh Kumar was under scrutiny by the opposition members for his denial of allegations of widespread electoral fraud in electoral rolls popularized as 'vote chori' (lit. 'vote theft') by the leader of opposition, Rahul Gandhi, denial of poll-booth CCTV footage and other requested data citing 2024 amendment election conduct rules, and alleged collusion of the ECI with the ruling Bharatiya Janata Party (BJP) government for "mimicking BJP rhetoric."

Gandhi claimed of electoral roll manipulation in electoral rolls of Karnataka’s Mahadevapura Assembly constituency, 2024 Haryana Legislative Assembly election, 2024 Maharashtra Assembly election and 2025 Bihar SIR, affecting over 150,000 voter entries. He raised objection to bulk quantity of duplicate voters and voters with invalid addresses, large number of voters with duplicate addresses, cross-voters between different states and fraudulent form-6 applicants, or new voter registrations bypassing eligibility checks. Litigation relating to the allegations seeking judicial intervention were unsuccessful and were instead asked to approach the ECI for grievances. The ECI maintained that the claims are baseless and urged Rahul Gandhi to submit an affidavit citing Registration of Electors Rules, 1960, although applicability of the rules for the issue is a contested topic among legal experts. No affidavit has not been filed since.

The incident lead to protests by opposition members and criticism of the ECI for lack of transparency and allegations of partisan conduct in favor of BJP. The congress also criticized the Chief Election Commissioner Act 2023 for granting criminal immunity to Chief Election Commissioners and leaving majority control in the selection process to the ruling government, both aspects that have been placed before the Supreme Court for constitutional alignment since, as politically motivated and stated that it had considered initiating an impeachment motion against Kumar.

=== 2026 SIR/CEC controversies ===
On 23 September 2026, a series of investigative reports by journalist Ritika Chopra was published in the The Indian Express alleging internal dissent in the commission against alleged unilateral decision-making by Gyanesh Kumar as the chief election commissioner, in breach of 2023 election commissioners act, and connecting topics of dissent to various controversies during the Special Intensive Revision exercise. The allegations of dissent and overall controversies surrounding the SIR has lead to major opposition parties and civic organizations to organize anti-CEC protests calling for resignation of Kumar with criminal proceedings against him, halting of SIR process and electoral reforms restoring trust in the ECI.
