= Association for Democratic Reforms v. Election Commission of India =

Public interest litigation in the Supreme Court of India

- Court: Supreme Court of India
- Full case name: Association for Democratic Reforms & Ors v. Election Commission of India
- Docket nos.: W.P. (C) No. 640/2025 (PIL-W)

Case history
- Prior action: Election Commission of India announced a Special Intensive Revision (SIR) of Bihar's electoral rolls on 24 June 2025
- Subsequent action: Draft electoral roll published on 1 August 2025; final roll scheduled for 30 September 2025

Holding
- Pending; interim directions issued on acceptable identity documents during SIR verification

Court membership
- Judges sitting: Surya Kant; Joymalya Bagchi

Case opinions
- On 10 July 2025, the Court urged ECI to consider Aadhaar, ration card, and EPIC as admissible documents for verification; on 14 August 2025, it directed ECI to allow use of Aadhaar by any “non-included” voter to challenge omission

Laws applied
- Constitution of India, Articles 324 and 326; Representation of the People Act, 1950, Sections 16 and 21(3)

Association for Democratic Reforms v. Election Commission of India., WP (Civil) 640/2025, also known as Bihar SIR electoral rolls case, is an ongoing public interest litigation in the Supreme Court of India challenging the Special Intensive Revision (SIR) of electoral rolls in Bihar by the Election Commission of India (ECI) ahead of 2025 Bihar Legislative Assembly election. The case is being heard by a two-judge bench of the court consisting of Justices Surya Kant and Joymalya Bagchi.

Political parties in opposition to National Democratic Alliance, the political alliance led by BJP and current ruling party of Indian Government, alleged irregularities and mass exclusion of voters due to the revision and challenged the legality and constitutionality of the effort. One of the petitioners, Association for Democratic Reforms, argued that SIR is arbitrary and disenfranchise millions of citizens without due process, thereby disrupting free and fair elections and democracy in the country.

In the most recent ruling as of August 2025, the court ordered ECI to disclose names deleted from the draft roll along with the reason for deletion.

== Background ==
On the 24th of June 2025, the Election Commission (EC) notified that it will conduct a Special Intensive Revision of electoral rolls in Bihar before the elections. The exercise requires all the voters from the state to fill forms to be included in the voter list. People whose names were not in the 2003 voter lists need to provide additional documents. The notification also mentioned that the documents needed to be submitted within a month, with 25th July being the deadline.

Further, the voters need to provide one of the eleven documents mandated by the EC, with the common documents such as the Aadhaar card, voter ID card and ration cards, not included as valid documents. A significant number of people in Bihar do not have any of the 11 documents. Furthermore, a significant population of the state migrate in other parts of India for work or study and it is estimated that at least 75 lakh (7.5 million) people from Bihar migrate to other parts of India. Critics have argued it would be difficult for such voters to be a part of this exercise. Such factors have led to fears of mass exclusion of voters. Opposition parties, such as the INDIA Bloc led by the Indian National Congress, alleged that such an exercise will favor the ruling NDA. The Election Commission denied these allegations and claimed that the exercise is lawful and constitutional.

The SIR was challenged in the Supreme Court.

== Proceedings ==
The batch of petitions filed in Supreme Court of India challenged the legality and procedure of the SIR. The ECI defendend its rights to conduct a SIR under the powers granted to the authority under Article 324 of the Constitution and Section 21(3) of the Representation of the People Act, 1951; arguing that the "exercise was necessitated by factors such as urban migration, demographic changes and concerns raised about inaccuracies in the existing rolls, which had not undergone an intensive revision for nearly two decades." It contested the allegations by political parties asking them to provide written proof of their claims.

=== Interim order ===
In an interim order on August 14, 2025, the Court directed the Commission to publish by 5 pm on August 19 a district‑wise, booth‑level searchable list of over 65 lakh electors deleted from the draft roll, with reasons for each deletion; to display the lists online and at BLO, block and panchayat offices with wide publicity; to accept objections supported by Aadhaar and EPIC as proof of identity and residence; and to file a collated compliance report. The judgement was positively received by the opposition parties in India.

=== Further directives ===
On August 22, 2025, the Court directed ECI to allow voters to submit claims for inclusion in draft rolls online, or physically, along with their Aadhaar card or any of the 11 documents listed by the Commission. It also directed the petitioning political parties to instruct their Booth Level Agents (BLA) in assisting voters for enrolment. The next hearing is scheduled for September 8.

== Significance ==
On August 17, 2025, following the interim order of the Court, ECI published the list of 65 lakh names omitted from the draft electoral rolls on its website. On the same day, Rahul Gandhi, a senior congress leader and the current leader of opposition in Lok Sabha, launched a sixteen-day state-wide rally,Vote Adhikar Yatra, to campaign for voter rights.
