= 2025 Vote chori controversy =

2025 allegations of voting manipulation by opposition parties in India

- Part of Democracy in India
- Date: August 2025 – November 2025
- Type: Politics of India
- Cause: Reports of voter roll manipulation by the Indian National Congress
- Motive: Alleged rigging of the 2024 Indian general election and state assembly elections in favor of the ruling Bharatiya Janata Party (BJP) government; Alleged partisan conduct of Election Commission of India
- Involved: Election Commission of India; Bharatiya Janata Party; Indian National Congress; Other political parties

The 2025 Vote chori (lit. 'vote theft') controversy refers to a series of electoral fraud allegations raised by the leader of opposition in the Lok Sabha, Rahul Gandhi from August to November 2025, concerning over 150,000 voter entries in Karnataka’s Mahadevapura Assembly constituency, 2024 Haryana Legislative Assembly election, 2024 Maharashtra Assembly election and 2025 Bihar SIR.

The allegations announced from August to November 2025, alleged of large number of new voters swaying election results in 2024 Maharashtra Assembly election in favor of BJP while Congress had secured its elections previously, that the electoral rolls prepared by the Election Commission of India (ECI) for the Mahadevapura Assembly constituency in Karnataka, and 2024 Haryana Legislative Assembly election, consisted of various discrepancies in voter information suggesting inclusion of illegitimate voters, and that several legitimate voters were unfairly excluded from Bihar's voter rolls under its ongoing Special Intensive Revision (SIR) exercise, intended for verification of voter rolls. He accused the election commission of "vote theft" and indulging in systematic fraud, in collusion with the ruling Bharatiya Janata Party (BJP). Litigation relating to the allegations seeking judicial intervention in the Supreme Court were unsuccessful and the petitioners were instead asked to approach the ECI for grievances. On 17 August, the ECI dismissed the claims, maintained the claims as “baseless and invalid," and urged him to submit an affidavit citing Registration of Electors Rules, 1960, although applicability of the rules for the issue is a contested topic among legal experts. No affidavit has not been filed since.

The BJP and Bharat Rashtra Samithi laid counter allegations accusing the Congress of "vote theft". In reaction to the allegation, several members and affiliates of the BJP have defended the commission. Various members have also criticized the election commission for lack of transparency during controversy, including for denial of data requested for investigation such as poll-booth CCTV records.

== Allegations ==
Earlier to the allegation, in July 2025, the opposition Indian National Congress (INC; commonly known simply as "the Congress") had accused the ECI of collusion with the ruling BJP, and of rigging the assembly elections in Madhya Pradesh and Maharashtra.

On 1 August 2025, Rahul Gandhi, the leader of opposition in Lok Sabha, alleged electoral fraud during the 2024 Indian general election. He referred to the evidence as an "atom bomb" and stated that the ruling party will have "no place to hide." On 6 August, the opposition demanded a discussion on the special exercise carried out by the ECI for the revision of electoral rolls in Bihar. Arjun Ram Meghwal, the law minister, asked Rahul Gandhi to present the evidences regarding the fraud and stated that the functioning of the election commission cannot be debated in parliament, citing a previous precedence by Lok Sabha speaker Balram Jakhar.

On 7 August, Rahul Gandhi, in a meeting of the press, alleged that the election commission added fraudulent voters to the electoral roll in the Mahadevapura Assembly constituency in Karnataka, and accused the commission of rigging the 2024 Lok Sabha elections. The Congress lost the election to the Bangalore Central Lok Sabha constituency, of which the assembly segment was part of, by 114,000 votes despite leading in the remaining six assembly segments of the constituency. He stated that the evidences were a result of a six month long research conducted by the party, and challenged the election commission to publish an electronic voter list and CCTV footage to debunk his claims. He raised objection to 11,965 duplicate voters, 40,009 voters with fake and invalid addresses, 10,452 bulk voters or single address voters, 4,132 voters with invalid photos, and 33,692 cross-voters between different states misusing Form 6, which is used for the registration of new voters for bypassing eligibility checks.

On 5 November, 2025 Rahul Gandhi alleged vote fraud in the 2024 Haryana Legislative Assembly election. He claimed theft of over 25 lakh votes in Haryana. He raised objection to bulk quantity of duplicate voters and voters with invalid addresses, large number of voters with duplicate addresses, cross-voters between different states and alleged mass deletion of votes. He presented evidence including repeated use of the same photographic images in voter rolls and cited the case of a Brazilian model's image, which appeared on multiple voter IDs across Haryana.

=== Counter allegations ===
On 13 August, the BJP counter accused the opposition parties of electoral irregularities in various parliamentary seats such as Rae Bareli, Wayanad, Diamond Harbour, and Kannauj and demanded resignation of the respective opposition members Rahul Gandhi, Priyanka Gandhi, Abhishek Banerjee, and Akhilesh Yadav representing those constituencies respectively. At a presentation held at the BJP headquarters in Delhi, the party alleged irregularities during the elections for the Kolathur assembly seat in Tamil Nadu represented by Tamil Nadu chief minister and Dravida Munnetra Kazhagam chief M. K. Stalin and in the Mainpuri parliamentary seat in Uttar Pradesh represented by Samajwadi party leader Dimple Yadav. It further accused the opposition leaders for rigging elections, and blamed the opposition of protecting their "vote bank" of illegal immigrants from Bangladesh. Bharat Rashtra Samithi chairman K. T. Rama Rao, also accused the Congress of 'vote theft' in the 2023 Telangana state elections.

== Response from the ECI ==
The election commission dismissed the allegations as baseless claims, and reverted that the Congress did not file any appeal or concern regarding the electoral rolls prior to the elections. It urged Rahul Gandhi to submit a written declaration with the allegations as per the rule 20(3)(B) of the Registration of Electors Rules, 1960 although applicability of the rules for the issue is contested among legal experts. The commission also referred to the allegation of a particular voter Shakuni Rani voting twice, and said that a preliminary enquiry conducted by the office confirmed that she only voted once. It further stated that the request for a machine readable voter list was rejected by the Supreme Court in 2019, and that reviewing the CCTV footage for the 100,000 voting booths is "implausible," claiming that the footage is retained only if any losing candidate files an election petition to challenge the election in the concerned High Court within 45 days of the election.

The chief electoral officers of Maharashtra and Haryana issued notices to Rahul Gandhi for submitting a formal declaration under 10 days for his alleged accusation of inclusion and exclusion of non-eligible and eligible voters by the election commission in the respective states. On 17 August, chief election commissioner Gyanesh Kumar responded to the claims of Rahul Gandhi stating that if the claims are not made under a declaration under oath within seven days, it would be considered as invalid, citing Registration of Electors Rules, 1960, although applicability of the rules for the issue is a contested topic among legal experts. He further stated that if Rahul Gandhi is not willing to submit a signed affidavit, he should then apologise for his allegations. No affidavit was filed since.

On 14 October, a petition seeking judicial intervention by formation of a Special Investigation Team based on vote chori allegations in Karnataka, was refused to be heard in the Supreme Court by a bench consisting of Chief Justice, Surya Kant and Justice, Joymalya Bagchi, instead referring the petitioner to approach the ECI. The congress also criticized the Chief Election Commissioner Act 2023 for granting criminal immunity to Chief Election Commissioners and leaving majority control in the selection process to the ruling government, as politically motivated and stated that it had considered initiating an impeachment motion against Kumar.

== Protests ==
On 11 August, about 200 lawmakers and their supporters held a protest against the special intensive revision exercise of the electoral rolls carried out in Bihar. They marched to the office of the election commission office in New Delhi, and claimed that it is a government conspiracy for "vote theft" which will lead to disenfranchisement. The Delhi Police detained multiple protesters including Rahul Gandhi. Protests were also held by the opposition in West Bengal.

On 12 August, members of parliament from the Congress and other opposition parties protested the alleged electoral fraud by wearing t-shirts which bore the face of Minta Devi, a 124-year-old woman from the Daraunda Assembly constituency. Minta Devi, who was reportedly 35 years old, condemned the use of her picture in the protest without her permission. The district administration later stated that a clerical error was responsible for the incorrect age.

On 13 August, Rahul Gandhi reportedly met with seven voters of Bihar whose names were allegedly removed from the electoral rolls declaring them as dead. On 14 August, he further declared that the opposition will set out a protest in all 30 districts of Bihar in three phases, beginning from 17 August, which was later postponed by a week. On 15 August, Congress launched "Vote chori se azaadi" campaign on their social media handles, and requested people to change their display pictures to support their protest against the election commission.

== Reactions ==
Anurag Thakur of the BJP called the allegations as an excuse for the defeat of congress in the elections and as a political agenda on the backdrop of the upcoming elections in Bihar.

== See also ==
- 2026 West Bengal election controversies
- 2026 Indian electoral controversy
- Special Intensive Revision (SIR)
- 2024 Indian general election
- Mahadevapura Assembly constituency
- Elections in Karnataka
- 2024 Haryana Legislative Assembly election
- Democracy in India
- Godi media
- Rahul Gandhi v. Election Commission of India
