= Dhruv Rathee =

Indian influencer and activist (born 1994)

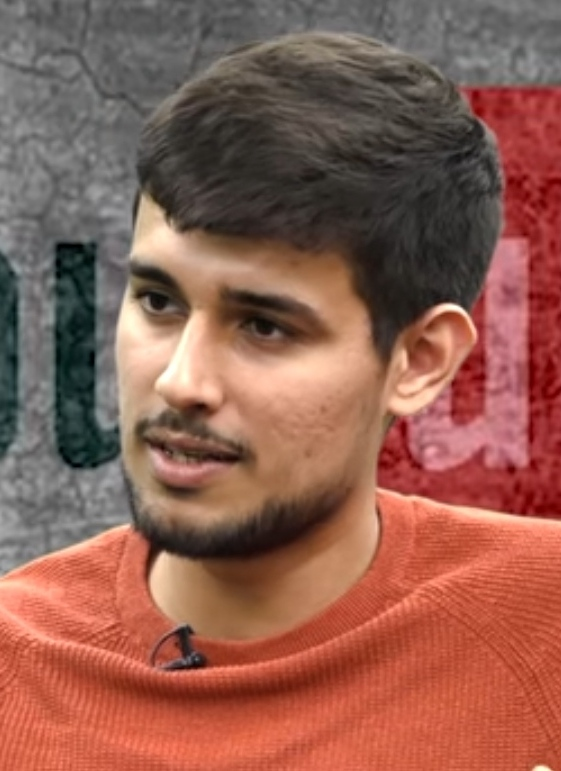
- Dhruv Rathee in 2019
- Born: 8 October 1994 (age 32); Rohtak, Haryana, India
- Citizenship: Indian
- Education: Karlsruhe Institute of Technology (BSc, MSc)
- Occupations: YouTuber; Activist; Vlogger
- Years active: 2014–present
- Spouse: Juli Lbr (m. 2021)
- Children: 1

Instagram information
- Page: Dhruv Rathee
- Followers: 20.1 million

X information
- Handle: @dhruv_rathee
- Followers: 3.4 million

YouTube information
- Channels: Dhruv Rathee; Dhruv Rathee Vlogs; Dhruv Rathee Shorts
- Years active: 2014–present
- Genres: Political commentary; Fact-checking; News; Vlog
- Subscribers: 33.2 million (main channel); 42.3 million (combined) (Note: Subscribers, broken down by channel: 33.2 million (Dhruv Rathee); 5.5 million (Dhruv Rathee Shorts); 3.6 million (Dhruv Rathee Vlogs))
- Views: 6.42 billion (main channel); 9.75 billion (combined) (Note: Views, broken down by channel: 6.42 billion (Dhruv Rathee); 2.68 billion (Dhruv Rathee Shorts); 655.7 million (Dhruv Rathee Vlogs))
- Last updated: 23 October 2026
- Website: dhruvrathee.com

Dhruv Rathee (born 8 October 1994, Hindi pronunciation: [d̪ʰrʊʋ raːʈʰiː]) is an Indian influencer and activist. He is known for his YouTube videos on social, political and environmental issues. As of 23 October 2026, he has over 42.3 million subscribers and 9.75 billion views across his YouTube channels, along with 20.1 million followers on Instagram, 3.4 million followers on X and 8.4 million followers on Facebook.

== Early life and education ==
Dhruv Rathee was born on 8 October 1994 into a Haryanvi Hindu Jat family in the Indian state of Haryana. He maintains his Indian citizenship. He completed his primary education in Haryana before pursuing higher education in Germany, earning a bachelor's degree in mechanical engineering and a master's degree in renewable energy from the Karlsruhe Institute of Technology.

== Career ==
Rathee is mostly known for his political videos, which primarily contain fact-checking and explanatory content. According to ThePrint, Rathee was one of the first Indian users to use YouTube as a political platform. He began uploading travel videos in 2013, but by the end of the year, he shifted his focus towards political and social topics.

Alongside his serious content, Rathee launched Pee News, a satirical "fake news" segment. Additionally, from 2017 until early 2020, Rathee wrote opinion columns for ThePrint.

In July 2020, Rathee began another YouTube channel called Dhruv Rathee Vlogs, where he shares his international travel vlogs. In addition to his vlogs, Rathee hosts various shows, including DW Travel of Deutsche Welle and Decode with Dhruv of Netflix India. He also hosts a podcast on Spotify called Maha Bharat with Dhruv Rathee.

As of February 2022, Rathee has a YouTube Shorts channel to share 30-seconds fact videos, offering a quick and accessible way for viewers to engage with the information he presents. On 18 April 2024, Rathee announced five new YouTube channels focusing on publishing dubbed videos in five Indian regional languages: Tamil, Telugu, Bengali, Marathi, and Kannada.

In October 2023, Rathee was included in Time's list of Next Generation Leaders.

On 8 October 2026, Ratheee participated in the Cockroach Janata Party protest against the CEC Gyanesh Kumar in Bengaluru. He was also scheduled to participate in the protest in Delhi on 10 October. But, having declared the protest "illegal", the police detained him from his home in Gurgaon where he was staying with his parents. He was released next day. After the release, he gave what he described as his first press conference.

== Personal life ==
Rathee resides in Germany. In November 2021, he married his long-time partner Juli Ibr at the Belvedere Palace in Vienna, Austria. Their first child was born in September 2024.
