= Sukhbir Singh Sandhu =

Indian election commissioner and civil servant

- ਸੁਖਬੀਰ ਸਿੰਘ ਸੰਧੂ

Election Commissioner of India
- Incumbent
- Assumed office 14 March 2024 Serving with Gyanesh Kumar (Note: Until 18 February 2025) and Vivek Joshi (Note: From 19 February 2025)
- Preceded by: Arun Goel

Secretary to the Lokpal of India
- In office 5 February 2024 – 14 March 2024
- Preceded by: Bharat Lal
- Succeeded by: Pradip Kumar Tripathi

Chief Secretary of Uttarakhand
- In office 6 July 2021 – 31 January 2024
- Preceded by: Om Prakash Singh
- Succeeded by: Radha Raturi

Chairman of NHAI
- In office 28 October 2019 – 5 July 2021
- Preceded by: N. N. Sinha
- Succeeded by: Giridhar Aramane

Personal details
- Born: 6 July 1963 (age 63) India
- Education: (MBBS) Government Medical College, Amritsar (M.A.) Guru Nanak Dev University
- Occupation: Retired IAS officer

Sukhbir Singh Sandhu (born 6 July 1963) is a retired IAS officer of 1988-batch belonging to the Uttarakhand cadre. He is serving as one of the two Election Commissioners of India since March 2024.

== Education ==
He did his MBBS from Government Medical College, Amritsar. He also has a Master of Arts degree in history from Guru Nanak Dev University, Amritsar. He is also a law graduate.

== Career ==
Previously, he served as Secretary, Lokpal of India, from 5 February 2024 till 14 March 2024. Before this, he served as the Chief Secretary, Government of Uttarakhand from July 2021 to January 2024. Prior to that, he served as Chairman, National Highways Authority of India (NHAI) for about 2 years. He also served in Government of India as Additional Secretary, Higher Education, where he looked after IITs, IIMs etc.

Earlier, he served in various positions in the Government of Uttarakhand, Government of Punjab and Government of Uttar Pradesh. He worked as Secretary in several departments including Infrastructure Development, Highways, PPP Projects, Urban Development, Power, Industries, New & Renewable Energy, Finance, etc.

He served as Principal Secretary to 4 CMs from 3 different political parties, for about eight years from 2007 to 2014.

In NHAI, arbitration disputes worth Rs. 30,000 Cr were resolved by conciliation during his tenure, bringing great relief to the contractors and banks. Nationwide compulsory ‘Fastag’ for Toll Collection was implemented by him, resulting in annual saving of about Rs.35,000 Cr to the nation. NHAI was made one of the most digitalised, drone monitored and portal governed organization during this period.

During his tenures as Chief Secretary, Govt of Uttarakhand, 35 policies of different departments were changed to make them more effective and delivery oriented, which led to better delivery, major investments and employment generation in almost all areas.

He had also served as Collector / District Magistrate of Haridwar, Gautam Budh Nagar (NOIDA) and Udham Singh Nagar districts.

He simplified the processes / procedures for effective delivery and found solution to many challenges. He has been a hockey player. He has interest in trekking and mountaineering and had scaled Black Peak (22,000 feet) in Uttarkashi District of Uttarakhand. He delivered a talk on ‘De-stressing Indian Cities’ at Harvard Business School, Boston, U.S.A, on invitation.

=== Election Commission ===
Sandhu was appointed to the Election Commission of India in March 2024, along with Gyanesh Kumar. It was the first time appointments were made to the Election Commission under the new law passed in 2023. The law was controversial due to the selection process, which gave undue weightage to the government in power. In February 2025, Gyanesh Kumar was made the Chief Election Commissioner (CEC) using the same law, after the previous CEC Rajiv Kumar demitted office.

Within months, the ECI under Gyanesh Kumar launched a highly controversial Special Intensive Revision (SIR) of electoral rolls across the country, starting with the state of Bihar. A Right to Information (RTI) request revealed that the Election Commission had not taken any decision to initiate such an exercise, leaving one to conclude that the CEC had acted unilaterally.

In September 2026, towards the end of the SIR exercise, an investigative report by The Indian Express revealed that the Election Commissioners, including Sandhu, had raised objections 14 times during the previous 10 months. They had objected to the centralisation of the electoral rolls under the ECI's software system, whereas the law required them to be under the control of the local Election Registration Officers (EROs). They had also objected to changes having been made to Form-6, used for the registration of new voters, as such changes could only be made by the government as part of electoral rules. Sandhu had put it on record that the changes were "unauthorised and illegal" and "must be removed immediately". Former CEC S. Y. Quraishi remarked that if two out of three Election Commissioners had disagreed, their view should have prevailed, but they appear to have been bypassed.

== Publications ==
Sandhu has published papers on 'Urban Reforms' and 'Municipal Management and Capacity Building'. He was conferred the President Medal in recognition of his services as Commissioner, Municipal Corporation, Ludhiana, Punjab.
