= Election Commission of India =

Constitutional body in India

- Official logo

Constitutional body overview
- Formed: 25 January 1950; 76 years ago (celebrated as National Voters' Day)
- Jurisdiction: India
- Headquarters: Nirvachan Sadan Ashoka Road, New Delhi; 28°37′26″N 77°12′40″E
- Employees: ~300
- Constitutional body executives: Gyanesh Kumar, Chief Election Commissioner; Sukhbir Singh Sandhu, Election Commissioner; Vivek Joshi, Election Commissioner
- Website: eci.gov.in

The Election Commission of India (ECI) is a constitutional body empowered to conduct free and fair elections in India. Established as per the Constitution of India, it is headed by a chief election commissioner (CEC) and consists of two other election commissioners as constituent members. The commission is headquartered in New Delhi.

The election commissioners are appointed by the president on the recommendation of a selection committee headed by the prime minister and comprising the leader of the opposition in the Lok Sabha and a member of the union cabinet nominated by the prime minister. The term of the CEC is a maximum of six years, provided they do not reach the age of 65 before the expiry of the term. The CEC can only be removed through a process similar to that of a judge of the Supreme Court, while election commissioners can be removed by the president on the recommendation of the CEC.

The ECI determines the dates for the filing of nominations, voting, counting and announcement of results for all the elections under its purview. In the states and union territories, elections are supervised by a chief electoral officer, under the direction of the ECI. At the district and constituency levels, election-related work is carried out by the district election officers, electoral registration officers, and returning officers. The commission is responsible for the registration and recognition of political parties in the country. It prepares electoral rolls, and issues elector identification cards to eligible voters. It is also responsible for scrutinising candidates, allotting ballot symbols, enforcing the model code of conduct to be followed by the political parties and candidates, and monitoring election expenditure.

== Structure ==
The Election Commission of India (ECI) was established as an independent constitutional body as laid down by the Constitution of India. In 1950, the ECI was established as a single-member body. As per the Election Commissioner Amendment Act, 1989, the commission was made a multi-member body headed by a chief election commissioner (CEC) and two other election commissioners, who were appointed to the commission for the first time on 16 October 1989. On 1 January 1990, it reverted to a single-member body after the posts of election commissioners were abolished. The three-member structure consisting of the CEC and two other election commissioners was restored on 1 October 1993. The CEC does not have the power to overrule the other commissioners, and decisions are taken by a majority vote among the three. The commission is assisted by director generals, principal secretaries and other officers. It is headquartered at Nirvachan Sadan in New Delhi.

In the states and union territories, elections are supervised by a chief electoral officer appointed by the ECI. At the district and constituency levels, election-related work is carried out by the district election officers, electoral registration officers, and returning officers.

== Appointment and term of office ==
The appointment and term of the election commissioners are prescribed in the Chief Election Commissioner and Other Election Commissioners (Appointment, Conditions of Service and Term of Office) Act, 2023. As per Section 7 of the act, an election commissioner is appointed by the president on the recommendation of a selection committee headed by the prime minister and comprising the leader of the opposition in the Lok Sabha and a member of the union cabinet nominated by the prime minister.

Previously, election commissioners were appointed by the president on the recommendation of the prime minister. In March 2023, the Supreme Court of India ruled that the appointments should be made by a committee consisting of the prime minister, leader of opposition, and the chief justice of India. This process was to remain in place until the parliament enacted a new law on this. The law enacted in 2023, replaced the chief justice with a union cabinet minister appointed by the prime minister on the selection committee, giving the government a dominant role in the appointment of election commissioners.

The term of the CEC is a maximum of six years from the date of assuming office. However, the CEC retires upon attaining the age of 65 years, even if the term has not expired. While the CEC can be removed only through a process similar to the impeachment of a Supreme Court judge, requiring a two-thirds majority of the members of the Lok Sabha and the Rajya Sabha present and voting in favour of the motion, election commissioners can be removed by the President on the recommendation of the CEC. The terms of service of the CEC cannot be altered to their disadvantage during their tenure.

== Powers and functions ==
The ECI is a body constitutionally empowered to conduct free and fair elections to parliament, the state legislative assemblies, state legislative councils and the offices of the president and vice-president. It operates under the powers granted by Article 324 of the Constitution and subsequently enacted Representation of the People Act. The state election commissions are independent constitutional bodies responsible for conducting elections to the local bodies in their respective states and union territories. The ECI decides the dates for the filing of nominations, voting, counting and announcement of results for the elections under its purview. While supervising elections, the ECI has the power to cancel an election or order a repoll in cases of electoral malpractice, such as rigging or election-related violence.

The ECI issues a model code of conduct for political parties and candidates to ensure that the elections are conducted in a free and fair manner. The code of conduct was first issued during the 1960 Kerala assembly elections and was adopted nationally for the 1962 Indian general elections. It has since been revised from time to time and lays down guidelines for the conduct of political parties and candidates during an election period. Instances of violations of the code by political parties and the misuse of official machinery by candidates are dealt with in accordance with the law.

The ECI has the power to register and recognise any political party in the country. Based on the legislation governing the registration of political parties in 1989, parties are classified as national or state parties based on their electoral performance. The ECI has the right to allot symbols to the political parties based on their status. The same symbol cannot be allotted to two registered political parties, even if they do not contest elections in the same region.

The ECI is responsible for delimiting electoral constituencies in accordance with the delimitation laws. It prepares the electoral rolls and periodically updates the voter lists. To prevent electoral fraud, electoral photo identity cards were introduced for eligible voters in 1993. Other legal documents such as ration cards have also been accepted as proof of identity for voting in certain circumstances.

The ECI is responsible for scrutinising the nomination papers of candidates seeking to contest elections. A person can be disqualified from contesting the elections if they provide incorrect or incomplete information in their affidavits or have been convicted by a court in India and sentenced to imprisonment for two years or more. In 2017, the ECI supported the imposition of a lifetime ban on convicted persons from contesting elections in an affidavit submitted to the Supreme Court.

The ECI sets limits on election-related expenditure by candidates during election campaigns. It appoints officers from the Indian Revenue Service serving with the Income Tax Department as election observers. Candidates are required to submit an affidavit detailing their assets and liabilities, among other particulars, along with their nomination papers. They must also submit details of their election expenditure within 30 days of the declaration of results.

The ECI renders advice to the president and state governors on the disqualification of members of parliament and state legislative assemblies, in accordance with the relevant constitutional provisions.

The ECI is empowered restrict the dissemination or publication of opinion polls and exit polls that may influence voters, in accordance with the applicable legal provisions. It operates various electronic media including websites and mobile applications for enabling various functions such as addressing grievances, checking electoral rolls, disseminating information on candidates, announcement of results, and monitoring of assigned tasks.

== Voting ==
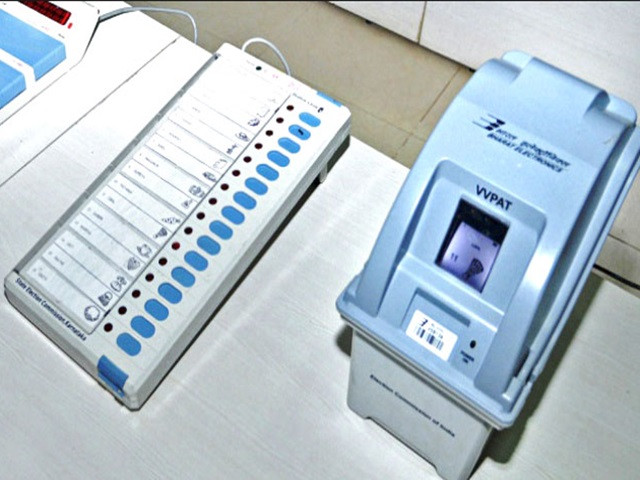
Electronic voting machines (EVMs) with Voter-verified paper audit trail (VVPAT)

Voting in India is done using electronic voting machines (EVMs) with provisions for postal voting and special arrangements for older people and persons with disabilities. EVMs were introduced by the ECI to reduce electoral malpractices, reduce costs, and improve efficiency. They were first trialled in 1982 during the by-election to Paravur assembly constituency in Kerala, at a limited number of polling stations. Following successful trials and legal scrutiny, the commission introduced these voting machines in a phased manner since the late 1990s. The machines are manufactured by two public sector undertakings–Bharat Electronics and Electronics Corporation of India Limited.

Due to verifiability concerns, a voter-verified paper audit trail (VVPAT) system was developed by the ECI, which was put on field trials in 2011. It was later used in various legislative elections and in eight Lok Sabha constituencies in 2014 Indian general election, and is used in all the Indian elections since 2019 based on an order by the Supreme Court.

NOTA Voting Symbol in India

In 2014, the none of the above (NOTA) was introduced as an option on the voting machines and is now a mandatory option to be provided in any election. The specific symbol for NOTA, depicting a ballot paper with a black cross across it, was introduced on 18 September 2015. Photographs of the candidates on the EVMs were first introduced in the 2015 Bihar Legislative Assembly election.

The ECI organised an open hackathon on 3 June 2017, inviting participants to attempt to hack the EVMs used by the commission. As no participants came forward, the functioning of the EVM and VVPAT machines was demonstrated at the event.

Postal voting is conducted using electronically transmitted postal ballot papers. The ballot papers are distributed to the eligible registered voters, who return their votes by post. Postal votes are counted before counting of the votes cast in the EVMs. Only certain categories of people are eligible to vote by post. Employees serving in the Indian Armed Forces and state police forces along with their spouses, and Indian government employees posted abroad are eligible for postal vote. People in preventive detention can use vote by post whereas prisoners are not allowed to vote. The ECI has provided eligible individuals aged 80 and above and those with disabilities with the option of voting from home.

Although the ECI does not maintain data on voters with disabilities, as ascertained by the response to a RTI application filed in 2014, it offers sign language support to assist voters with hearing or speech impairments.

== See also ==
- 2025 Indian electoral controversy
- 2026 West Bengal election controversies – Controversies related to the 2026 West Bengal Legislative Assembly election
- 2026 Indian electoral controversy – Controversy about decision-making process in India's electoral body
- 2026 anti-CEC protests – Anti-CEC protests in India
- History of democracy in the Indian-subcontinent
- Special Intensive Revision – Process of reorganising electoral voter rolls in India
