= Special Intensive Revision =

Process of reorganising electoral voter rolls in India

Special Intensive Revision (SIR)
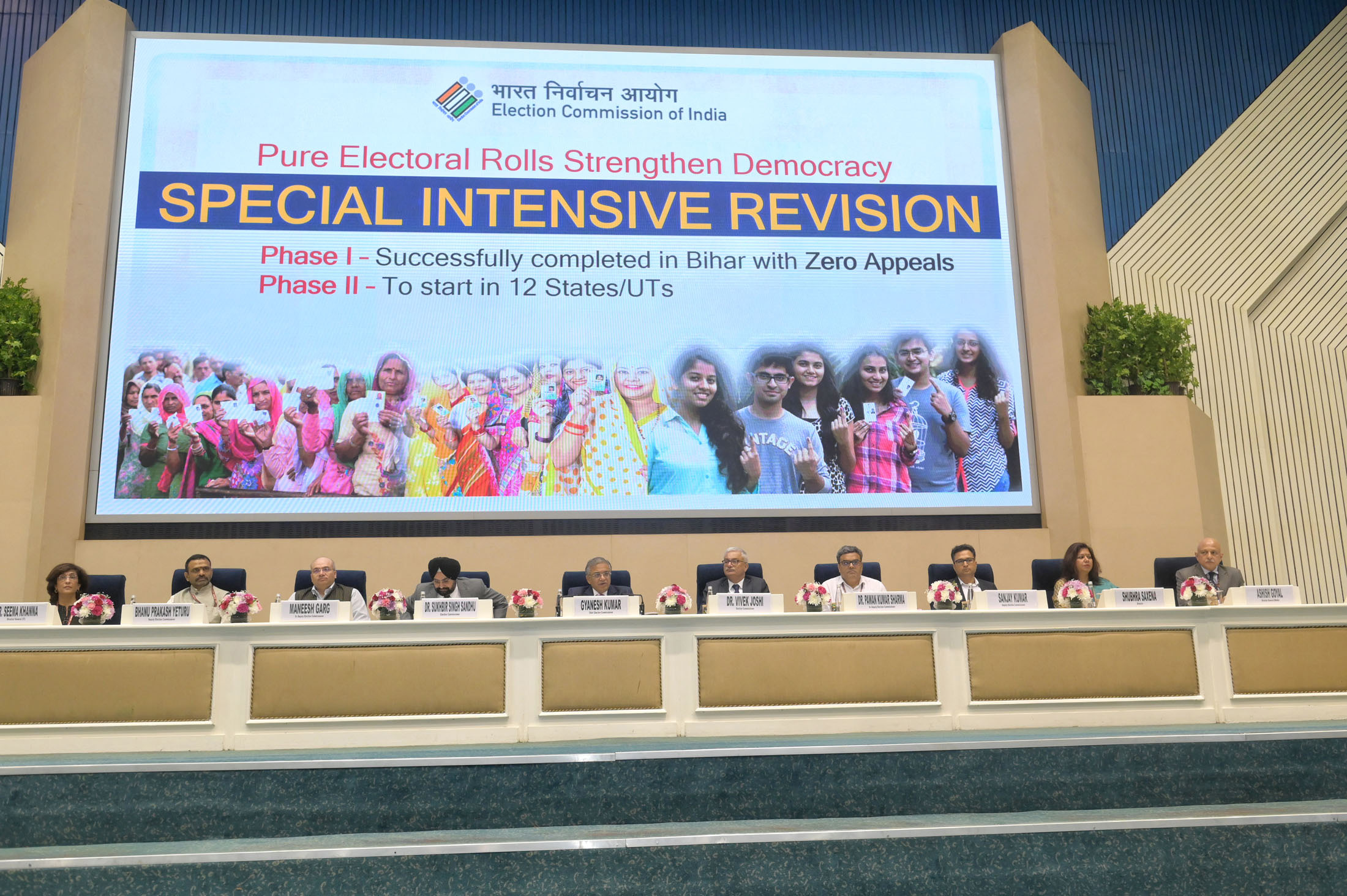
- CEC Gyanesh Kumar announcing the nationwide SIR process (October 2025)

Agency overview
- Type: Electoral roll revision programme
- Jurisdiction: Government of India
- Status: Active
- Headquarters: New Delhi
- Agency executive: Gyanesh Kumar, Chief Election Commissioner of India
- Parent agency: Election Commission of India; Government of India
- Website: eci.gov.in

During 2025–2026 the Election Commission of India ordered a nation-wide Special Intensive Revision (SIR) of electoral rolls in India, which was meant to be an intensive revision combined with a stylised form of citizenship verification. Electors were asked to prove that either they were listed in the previous intensive revision around 2003 or that they descended from such electors. As of October 2026, the SIR exercise has deleted 130 million (13 crore) names from electoral rolls, with an expected final list of 880 million (88 crore) voters. Given that the adult population of India is estimated at 1.03 billion (103 crore) by the Government of India, the resulting shortfall is of 150 million (15 crore) "missing voters". The exercise has been characterised as a mass disenfranchisement of a large part of the electorate. The poor and the marginalised sections, Muslims and women bore the brunt of this disenfranchisement.

Throughout the conduct of SIR, various concerns and criticisms were raised against the process by the civil society, including former election commissioners. The Association for Democratic Reforms challenged it in the Supreme Court of India. The SIR exercise proceeded nevertheless with some adjustments in the process. State after state ratcheted up millions of deletions of electors. Eventually, The Indian Express published an investigative report in September 2026, revealing that there was no agreement within the three-member Election Commission over various aspects of the process. This shook the country's confidence in the SIR exercise, leading to major protests held by the youth movement Cockroach Janata Party and the INDIA bloc opposition parties, demanding the resignation of Chief Election Commissioner Gyanesh Kumar. In October, the matters were again referred to the Supreme Court.

== Name ==
The term "Special Intensive Revision" used by the Election Commission in 2025 appears to be new. The Manual on Electoral Rolls published by ECI in March 2023, makes no mention of any process called "Special Intensive Revision". Under paragraph 9.3 titled "Types of Revision", the manual lists four types: Intensive Revision, Summary Revision, Special Summary Revision, and Partly Intensive and Partly Summary Revision. Since the Manual covers all the revisions conducted since independence under "Historical Background", it follows that no exercise called "Special Intensive Revision" has ever been conducted prior to 2023.

The manual states that, in 2002–2003, a "Special [Summary] Revision of Intensive Nature" was undertaken in 20 states. It also notes that this exercise was different from an Intensive Revision, since a working copy of electoral roll was updated through house-to-house verification. (Note: As the manual explains, a "special revision" updates the existing electoral roll, whereas an "intensive revision" discards the existing electoral roll and constructs a new roll afresh through house-to-house enumeration. In the 2002–2003 exercise, the then existing electoral roll was updated (as a summary revision) but using a house-to-house verification (suggested by the term "intensive nature").)

In various unofficial communications and press releases during 2025–2026, the Election Commission implied that the SIR was a regular practice of ECI, which had been conducted "eight times" since independence. It also claimed in the Supreme Court that the 2025 exercise was a repetition of the 2003 exercise. Neither claim can be validated. The exercises prior to 2002–2003 were Intensive Revisions, not special Intensive Revisions. The 2002–2003 exercise was a Summary Revision, as pointed out in the Manual. Though it can be argued that it had the effect of an Intensive Revision because of door-to-door verification, it did not discard the previous electoral roll and construct a new one. Association for Democratic Reforms (ADR) has pointed out five basic differences between the two exercises in the Supreme Court, and charged the ECI with giving an "untruthful account".

An Intensive Revision in ECI terminology involves constructing a fresh electoral roll through door-to-door enumeration of voters. The qualification "Special" indicates the use of ECI's discretionary powers under Section 21(3) of the Representation of People Act, 1950. Former Chief Election Commissioner O. P. Rawat stated that the term "Special" is used when the exercise does not conform to the standard template of revision, but tinkers with certain elements. (Note: It was noted by analysts that there is no mention of any "Special Intensive Revision" in the 1960 Election Rules, under which the ECI normally operates. The ECI told the Supreme Court that it had conducted an "SIR" in Bihar in 2003, but it could not provide evidence for the claim. For the 2002–04 revision and the dispute over citizenship checks, see below.)

Scholar Darshana Mitra has stated that the main tinkering was in the role of the enumerators in clarifying the electors' citizenship.

== Citizenship verification ==
Citizenship determination in India is a complicated issue since the Indian citizenship law is a complex mix of citizenship-by-birth and citizenship-by-descent. Large sections of the populace do not possess documents that can demonstrate their citizenship, especially the poor, the disadvantaged sections and women. An exercise to construct a National Register of Citizens for Assam took five years to complete, causing inexorable trauma to millions of citizens and eventually left out 1.9 million people from the register, whose status is yet undetermined. The exercise is generally considered a failure.

Since the 1980s, the ECI has been concerned about preventing the inclusion of foreign nationals in electoral rolls. It also received multiple complaints from the chief ministers of border states about the enrolment of foreign nationals. But the ECI had upheld the "sanctity" of the existing rolls, by placing the burden of proof on those objecting to the inclusion rather than the electors themselves. In 1983 the ECI directed that deletion from the rolls required documentary proof from the objector, while setting special verification procedures for first-time enrolment in areas with abnormal increases in electors.

During the 1997 intensive revision of electoral rolls in Assam, the Electoral Registration Officers (EROs) were asked to decide on the inclusion or exclusion of the electors. Based on spot checks by Local Verification Officers, the EROs doubted the citizenship of roughly 300,000 people, who were then marked as "D-voters". Many of them were referred to Foreigners' Tribunals for deciding their citizenship status, put into detention camps, and even pushed into Bangladesh.

During the 2002–2003 revision, citizenship evidence was sought only from a small segment of the population in specified areas. No elector already on the roll could be subjected to citizenship verification unless someone objected, in which case the burden of proof lay with the objector.

== Overview ==
=== Bihar SIR ===
The ECI ordered an SIR in the state of Bihar on 24 June 2025, four months before the state was scheduled to hold its next Legislative Assembly election. Booth Level Officers (BLOs) made house-to-house visits and distributed pre-filled enumeration forms containing names of the electors along with Electoral Photo Identity Card (EPIC) numbers and other data. The electors were asked to affix a photograph, fill in their date of birth as well as the names and EPIC numbers of their parents. If they were not already included in the "legacy" electoral rolls from around 2003, they also had to attach proof of their citizenship. The ECI stipulated 11 types of documents they could provide. Some of the common identification documents carried by people, such as Aadhaar cards, EPICs, ration cards and National Rural Employment Guarantee Scheme (NREGS) documents, were excluded. Identification documents had to be provided by electors not only for themselves but also their parents as warranted by the Citizenship Act (along with amendments in 1986 and 2003). (Note: If their parents were born after 1987, the Citizenship Act also requires one or more grandparents to be a citizen. But the ECI spared this requirement. The ECI also did not require any further checks for "legacy" electors from 2003. So the SIR did not involve a full citizenship verification.)

People had considerable difficulty coming up with the stipulated documents. For example, birth certificates were among the stipulated documents, but were carried by only 2 percent of the population. Matriculation or college certificates were carried by only a 10 percent of the people of age 40–60. It was later reported that the majority of the voters did not have even a single one of the 11 stipulated documents. However, unofficially, it was learnt that the BLOs had been told to accept Aadhaar cards and EPICs as verifying documents. Due to the tight schedule, the document upload was carried out after the draft roll was published and the ECI reported that documents were received from 98.2% of the electors.

When the draft election roll was published in early August, it had 72.4 million names, 6.5 million fewer than the prevailing roll. ECI said that the deletions included 2.2 million dead, 3.6 million that migrated out of the state, and 0.7 million were duplicate entries. An analysis by Hindustan Times found no discernible pattern to the deletions.

=== Supreme Court review ===
In early July, petitions were filed in the Supreme Court by the Association for Democratic Reforms (ADR), the People's Union for Civil Liberties (PUCL) and several opposition politicians. ADR argued that the onerous requirements for documents violated the universal adult franchise under Article 326 of the Indian Constitution. PUCL argued that ECI was mandated to enable the right to vote for all adult citizens and so it had to ensure that those with "document deficits" were not left out of the process.

In the initial hearing on 10 July, the judges framed the case in terms of three questions: whether the ECI had the right to undertake such an exercise, whether it was following the correct procedure, and whether it had allowed sufficient time for the process. The ECI argued in its counter-affidavit that it was vested with the power to scrutinise the eligibility of voters, which included citizenship. The court contested ECI's claims that the 11 documents were widely available and pressed it to consider the inclusion of Aadhaar cards and EPICs.

The eventual judgment came in May 2026, after the second round of SIR exercises had already been initiated. The court upheld the ECI's right to conduct SIR as part of its constitutional obligation, as well as to verify citizenship status to the "limited extent of determining inclusion or exclusion from the electoral roll". Electors purged from the rolls on suspicion of being non-citizens should be referred for adjudication by a competent authority under the Citizenship Act. The Court also observed that the enquiry of the ECI must itself be quasi-judicial in character, ensure the right to a fair hearing, and the persons should be informed of the grounds on which they are suspected to be foreigners. The Supreme Court also directed the ECI to include Aadhaar cards among the allowed identification documents, and to publish all the names deleted from electoral rolls in an accessible form.

=== Second phase ===
The second phase of SIR exercises covering 12 states and union territories were announced on 27 October 2025. They included the four states, Kerala, Tamil Nadu, West Bengal and Puducherry, where Assembly elections were due to be held in 2026. In addition, SIR was also conducted in Chhattisgarh, Goa, Gujarat, Madhya Pradesh, Rajasthan, Uttar Pradesh, Andaman and Nicobar Islands and Lakshadweep. Assam, another state due to hold elections in 2026, was left out of the SIR process on the grounds that the Supreme Court-monitored NRC exercise was yet to conclude.

The ECI modified the procedures based on the experience from Bihar and the issues raised during the Supreme Court hearings. Documents were not collected in the enumeration phase. Instead, the enumeration forms had been modified in order to link the electors with their own records or their parents' records in the previous intensive revision conducted anywhere in the country. Only in cases where such "linkages" could not be made with "legacy" electors would documents be required. The electors that could not establish such linkages were called "unmapped" electors. In addition, the ECI deployed ERONET software which flagged cases of "logical discrepancies", which involved spelling variations, age/relationship mismatches and other inconsistencies. People mapped with six or more progeny and those with an age gap of less than 15 years or more than 50 years with their parents were flagged. All such cases were asked to appear before the EROs for hearings.

In all states except West Bengal, draft rolls were published in December and January and then hearings by EROs were conducted. By April, 64.4 million (6.44 crore) names were removed for the reasons of being absent, shifted, dead and duplicated, and an additional 6.3 million (63 lakh) names removed after objections and adjudication.

=== West Bengal SIR ===
In poll-bound West Bengal, the SIR process worked differently as noted by The Indian Express. The initial process flagged 3.2 million "unmapped" voters, and 13.6 million electors for "logical discrepancies". All such electors had to appear for hearings. In addition, the ECI asked Chief Electoral Officer in West Bengal to appoint "micro-observers" to keep a watch on EROs and Assistant EROs trying to decide the cases. These new officials alleged that the EROs were not deleting ineligible electors and were uploading improper documents. The Supreme Court, which was hearing a batch of petitions challenging the process, noted the "trust deficit" between the state government and the ECI. It then used its powers under Article 142 of Indian constitution to pass a decree in the interest of complete justice, and placed all the remaining cases under judicial review. The Calcutta High Court was asked to deploy serving and former district judges to oversee the pending cases.

When the revised electoral roll was published on 28 February, 6.18 million names had been deleted for reasons such as death and migration, and, in addition, another 6 million (60 lakh) names were declared to be "under adjudication". Districts with large Muslim populations such as Malda and Murshidabad were particularly affected. Some 700 judicial officers from West Bengal and the neighbouring states of Odisha and Jharkhand worked continuously to decide the pending cases. In early April, they cleared 3.3 million voters, leaving 2.7 million electors as ineligible. The Supreme Court expressed concern over the deletions but refused to intervene. The deleted voters were allowed to appeal to special appellate tribunals that were set up under the Supreme Court direction. But the Legislative Assembly election now went ahead without them.

The Bharatiya Janata Party (BJP) won the Legislative Assembly election with a landslide, unseating the ruling party, Trinamool Congress (TMC). Noted psephologist Prannoy Roy analysed the data and observed that the SIR deletion of voters contributed to the election result. He found a positive correlation between the volume of deletions and swing in vote share against the TMC: "The more the deletions, the bigger the swing against the TMC." He also noted that the SIR deletions disproportionately affected women voters and Muslims, who were likely voters of TMC. Requests for exclusion of voters by objectors (via "Form 7") almost always succeeded, with a 97.5% success rate. In contrast, applications for inclusion of new voters (via "Form 6") succeeded only 50% of the time.

Voters whose names were deleted were given an opportunity to appeal the deletions. Out of 2.7 million deleted voters, 2.2 million people filed appeals. At the same time, 1.6 million appeals for exclusion of included voters were also filed. It transpired that most of these exclusion appeals were filed by Election Commission officials themselves, on behalf of ECI. An Election Commissioner questioned who authorised these appeals, according to an investigative report by The Indian Express. As of October 2026, the question has not been answered.

Nineteen appellate tribunals were set up by the Calcutta High Court to handle the appeals, manned by retired High Court judges. As of October 2026, over 100,000 cases have been decided. The Election Commisison estimated that, at the current rate, it would take 12 years to resolve all the pending appeals. The results of the decided appeals show 80–90 percent success rate, indicating that legitimate voters had been deleted through the SIR process, but they remain disenfranchised until a decision is made.

== Special Intensive Revision (SIR) phases ==
=== Phase I ===
The first phase of the Special Intensive Revision (SIR) was undertaken as an initial rollout in select States, with Bihar being the primary example. The exercise was conducted between June and September 2025. According to reports, approximately 47 lakh (4.7 million) electors were removed from the electoral rolls in the State following verification, representing around 5–6% of the total electorate.

Phase I (SIR)
| Total Voters | Revised Voters | Reduction (%) | States Covered | U/T Covered | Starting Date | End Date |
|---|---|---|---|---|---|---|
| 7.89 crore | ▼7.42 crore | 5.95% | 1 | — | June 2025 | September 2025 |

=== State-wise Statistics ===
| State | Total Voters | Revised Voters | Voters deleted (absolute) | Deletion (%) |
|---|---|---|---|---|
| Bihar | 7.89 crore | ▼7.42 crore | 47 lakh | 5.95% |

=== Phase II ===
The second phase of the Special Intensive Revision (SIR) was started on 27 October 2025, covered nine States and three Union Territories, including Uttar Pradesh and West Bengal, among others. The exercise resulted in a reduction of approximately 10.2% in the total number of electors, bringing the count down from over 50.99 crore to 45.81 crore. In absolute terms, Uttar Pradesh recorded the highest net deletion of 2.04 crore voters, followed by West Bengal with 83.86 lakh. In percentage terms, Andaman and Nicobar Islands recorded the highest deletion at 16.9%, while Lakshadweep recorded the lowest deletion at 0.36% (206 voters).

As per the Election Commission of India, a total of approximately 91 lakh Voters (Not in absolute terms) electors were removed from the electoral rolls in West Bengal since October 2025, while around 2.04 crore(Not in absolute terms) names were deleted in Uttar Pradesh following the Special Intensive Revision (SIR) process conducted between October 2025 to April 2026.

Phase II (SIR)
| Total Voters | Revised Voters(Absolute Numbers) | Reduction (in%) | States Covered | U/T Covered | Starting Date | End Date |
|---|---|---|---|---|---|---|
| 50.99 crore | ▼45.81 crore | 10.2% | 9 | 3 | 27 October 2025 | 4 December 2025 |

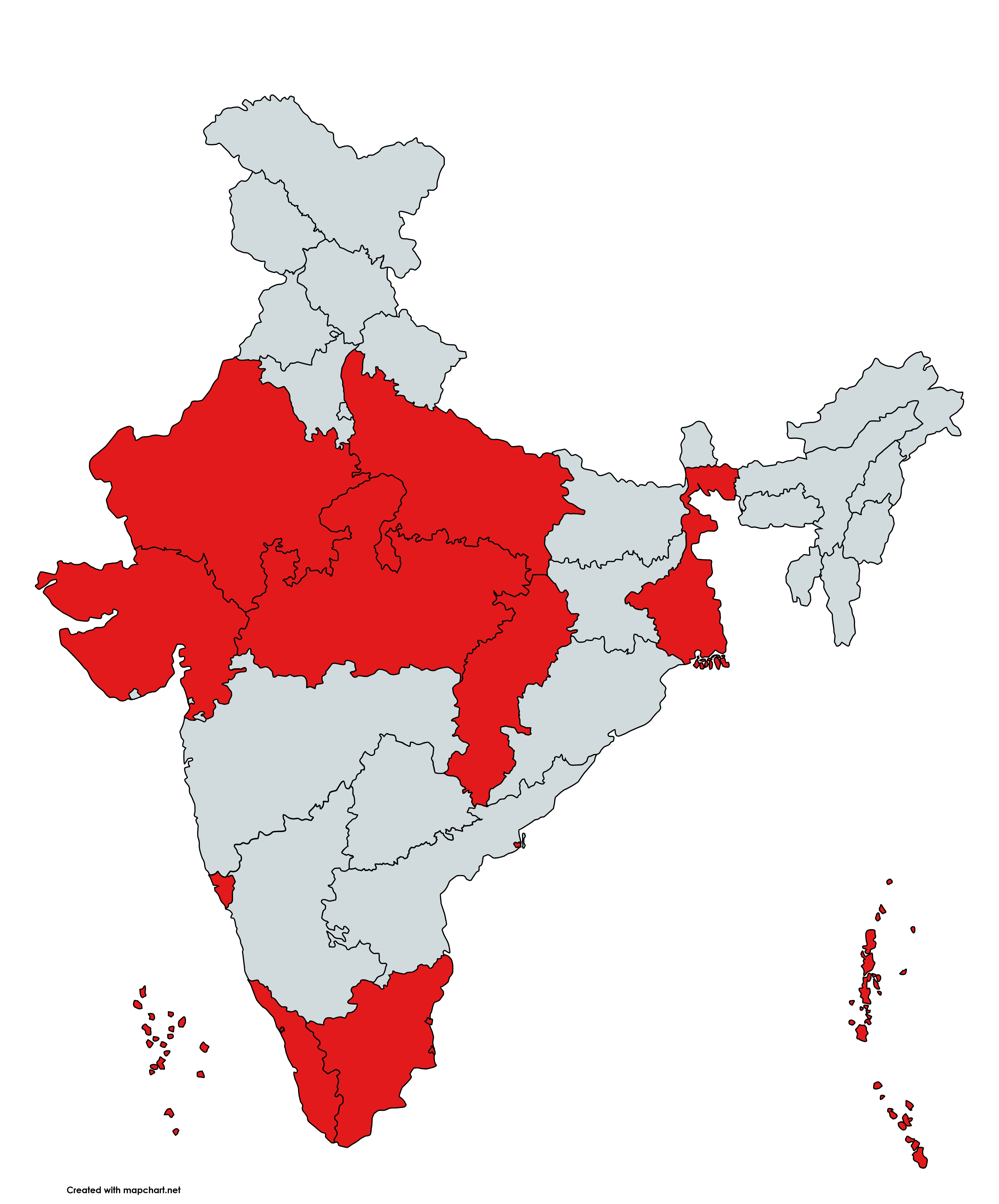
S.I.R Phase II States

=== State-wise statistics ===
| State/UT | Total Voters (before draft list) | Revised Voters (final roll) | Voters deleted (absolute\net) | Change(%) |
|---|---|---|---|---|
| Uttar Pradesh | 15.44 crore | 13.39 crore▼ | ~2.05 crore | -13.21% |
| West Bengal | 7.66 crore | 6.86 crore▼ | 83.86 lakh (Note: The number of deleted voters was first reported as 90.8 lakh, which was later reduced to 83.86, perhaps after addition of new voters.) | -10.9% |
| Gujarat | 5.08 crore | 4.40 crore▼ | 68 lakh | -13.4% |
| Madhya Pradesh | 5.74 crore | 5.39 crore▼ | 34.25 lakh | -5.97% |
| Chhattisgarh | 2.12 crore | 1.87 crore▼ | 25 lakh | -11.8% |
| Rajasthan | 5.46 crore | 5.15 crore▼ | 31 lakh | -5.7% |
| Tamil Nadu | 6.41 crore | 5.67 crore▼ | 74 lakh | -11.5% |
| Kerala | 2.78 crore | 2.69 crore▼ | 9 lakh | -3.24% |
| Goa | 11.85 lakh | 10.57 lakh▼ | 1.28 lakh | -10.8% |
| Puducherry | 10.21 lakh | 9.44 lakh▼ | 0.77 lakh | -7.54% |
| Andaman and Nicobar Islands | 3.10 lakh | 2.58 lakh▼ | 0.52 lakh | -16.9% |
| Lakshadweep | 0.57 lakh | 0.57 lakh▼ | 206 | -0.36% |
| Total (Phase II) | 50.99 crore | 45.81 crore▼ | -5.18 crore | -10.2% |

=== Phase III ===
On 14 May 2026, the Election Commission announced Phase III of the SIR, to be conducted in a phased manner across 16 states and three union territories: Andhra Pradesh, Arunachal Pradesh, Haryana, Jharkhand, Karnataka, Maharashtra, Manipur, Meghalaya, Mizoram, Nagaland, Odisha, Punjab, Sikkim, Tripura, Telangana and Uttarakhand, and the union territories of Delhi, Chandigarh, and Dadra and Nagar Haveli and Daman and Diu.

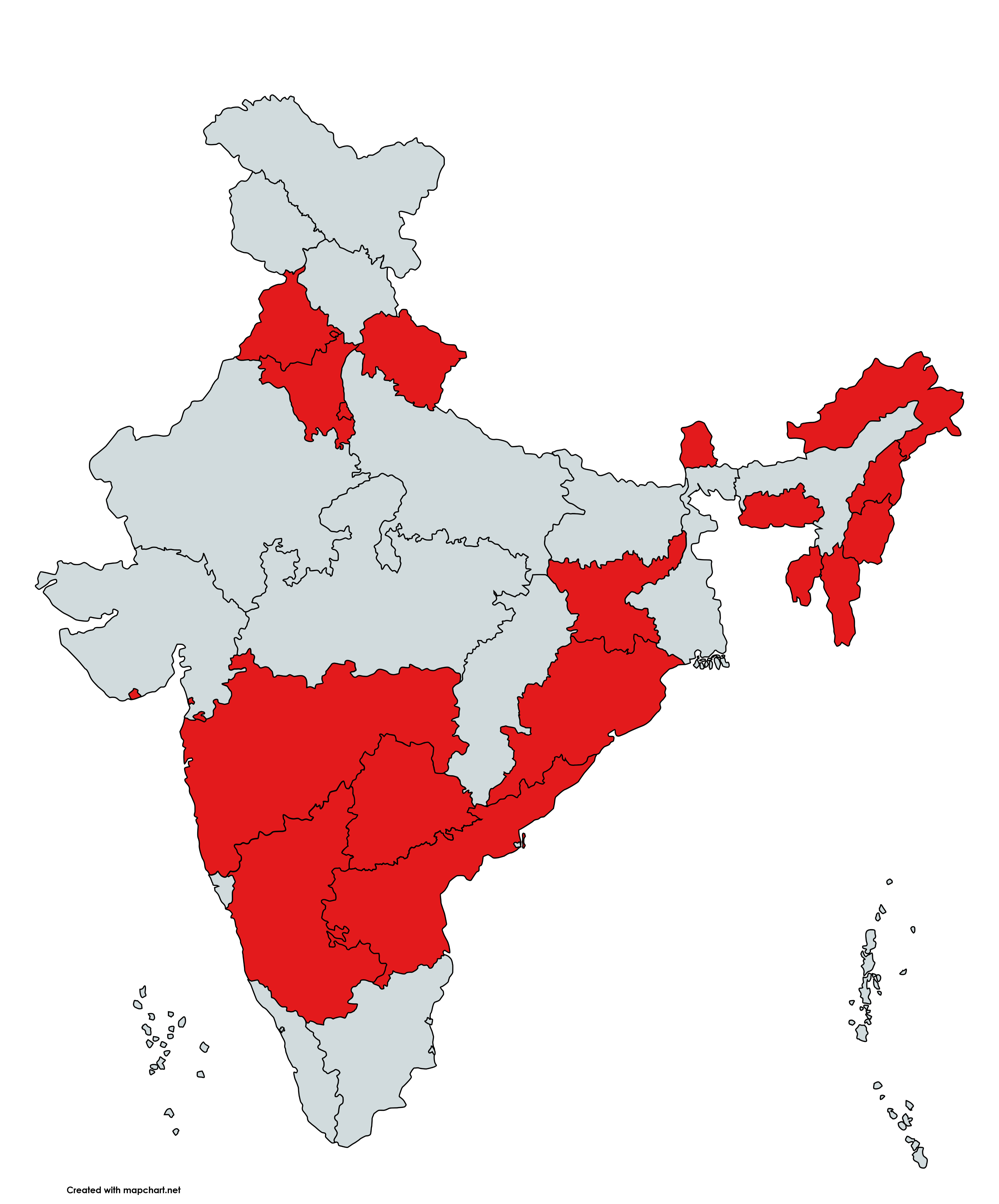
S.I.R Phase III States

In the enumeration phase, over 3.94 lakh Booth Level Officers were to visit 36.73 crore electors house to house, assisted by 3.42 lakh Booth Level Agents appointed by political parties, which the ECI asked to appoint agents for every polling booth. With Phase III the SIR covers the entire country except Himachal Pradesh, Jammu and Kashmir and Ladakh, for which the ECI said the schedule would be announced later, after the second phase of the Census there is complete and considering the weather in snow-bound upper reaches. In the first two phases, covering 13 states and union territories with nearly 59 crore electors, over 6.3 lakh Booth Level Officers and 9.2 lakh Booth Level Agents had been involved. Enumeration began at the end of May 2026 in Odisha, Mizoram, Sikkim and Manipur.

Draft rolls were published in stages from July 2026, beginning with Odisha on 5 July, followed by Haryana and Andhra Pradesh on 31 July, Karnataka on 24 August, and Maharashtra and Delhi on 31 August. By early September the draft rolls had left out about 6.15 crore names across 17 states and union territories, according to The Wire; the share of electors excluded was highest in Delhi (32.78%), Dadra and Nagar Haveli and Daman and Diu (29.65%), Telangana (21.69%) and Maharashtra (21.14%). Electors left out of a draft roll can file claims and objections, which are heard before the final roll is published; final rolls are being published in stages. The first, for Manipur and Sikkim on 6 September, left out about 6.3% and 11% of their electorates respectively, while those of Karnataka are scheduled for 27 October and Maharashtra for 4 November 2026.

Phase III: electors excluded from draft rolls (figures will change when final rolls are published)
| State/UT | Electors excluded from draft roll | Share of earlier electorate (%) |
|---|---|---|
| Delhi | 47.7 lakh | 32.78 |
| Dadra and Nagar Haveli and Daman and Diu | — | 29.65 |
| Telangana | 73.39 lakh | 21.69 |
| Maharashtra | 2.07 crore (9.79 crore before, 7.72 crore in draft) | 21.14 |
| Karnataka | over 1.07 crore | 19.48 |
| Arunachal Pradesh | — | 19.09 |
| Jharkhand | — | 16.48 |
| Haryana | 33.83 lakh | 16.38 |
| Chandigarh | — | 12.8 |
| Nagaland | 1.51 lakh (13.57 lakh before, 12.06 lakh in draft) | 11.11 |
| Andhra Pradesh | 44.89 lakh | 10.8 |
| Uttarakhand | — | 10.39 |
| Punjab | 13.60 lakh | 9.6 |
| Sikkim | 37,724 | 8.01 |
| Meghalaya | — | 7.67 |
| Manipur | 1.59 lakh (20.93 lakh before, 19.34 lakh in draft) | 7.58 |
| Odisha | 20.12 lakh | 6.02 |
| Mizoram | 46,162 (8.75 lakh before, 8.29 lakh in draft) | 5.28 |

== Reception ==
=== Allegations about the 2025 Bihar order and procedure ===
In its petition to the Supreme Court, ADR argued that the 24 June 2025 order shifted the onus of being on the voters' list from the state to citizens, and that its documentation requirements, lack of due process and short timeline would remove the names of lakhs of genuine voters; the organisation apprehended the disenfranchisement of nearly three crore voters. ADR also argued that the onerous documentary requirements violated universal adult franchise under Article 326 of the Constitution. PUCL argued that the ECI was mandated to enable the right to vote of all adult citizens and so had to ensure that those with "document deficits" were not left out. Concerns were also raised that the exercise could be an attempt to introduce the National Register of Citizens (NRC) "through the backdoor".

Writing in The Caravan, Sagar argued that many people had considerable difficulty producing the stipulated documents: birth certificates, for example, were held by only about 2% of the population, and matriculation or college certificates by about 10% of people aged 40–60. Frontline later reported that the majority of voters did not have even one of the 11 stipulated documents. The Caravan article also stated that, unofficially, BLOs had been told to accept Aadhaar cards and EPICs as verifying documents.

Opposition parties and protesters have alleged that the revision could disproportionately affect certain groups of voters and benefit the BJP. An analysis by Hindustan Times of the Bihar draft roll found no discernible pattern to the deletions (see Bihar SIR), whereas an analysis by The Wire of the Phase III draft rolls reported that the share of electors excluded was highest in states where elections had been held in the previous three years. The Quint reported that the Commission's press release of 24 June 2025 listed the inclusion of "foreign illegal immigrants" among its reasons for the exercise, that the phrase was absent from press releases issued afterwards, and that the Commission had not provided details of the number of such immigrants found in Bihar.

=== Allegations about citizenship checks, migration and the NRC ===
Writing in The India Forum, Darshana Mitra identified the role of enumerators in clarifying electors' citizenship as the most important change from earlier intensive revisions. India Today observed that citizenship determination in India is complicated by the mix of citizenship-by-birth and citizenship-by-descent, that large sections of the population, especially the poor, the disadvantaged and women, may lack documents demonstrating citizenship, and that the Assam NRC exercise is generally considered a failure. Mitra further wrote that many of those marked as D-voters in the 1997 Assam revision were put into detention camps and some were pushed into Bangladesh.

In West Bengal, the SIR generated uncertainty among sections of the population, including Hindu refugees from Bangladesh and members of the Matua community, and concern about the consequences among Bangladeshi nationals living in India without authorisation. Some residents and political opponents expressed concern that the SIR could be a precursor to implementing the National Register of Citizens (NRC). India Today reported that 200–300 people were arriving daily at the Hakimpur checkpost near Basirhat to return to Bangladesh, and said that many of them had, according to its report, entered India illegally years earlier and obtained Indian identity documents, including Aadhaar and voter cards, through agents or other intermediaries. Other reporting attributed the departures to fears among undocumented Bangladeshi nationals that the verification could lead to detection, legal action or deportation, with some associating the exercise with the NRC. The Times of India reported anxiety among Hindu refugees from Bangladesh, particularly Matuas, many of whom feared they could not establish linkage with the 2002 electoral roll despite holding Indian identity and other documents. ThePrint reported continuing uncertainty over how the Citizenship Amendment Act (CAA) and the SIR interact. Hindustan Times reported suicides among some Hindu migrants from Bangladesh during the SIR period. Political parties and families attributed some of these deaths to anxiety over the revision and possible NRC-related consequences; these causal claims were disputed.

The ECI has argued that its verification of citizenship is carried out only for electoral purposes, is "liberal" in method and is not intended to lead to deportation, and that the 2003 roll could be treated as evidence of eligibility (see History). BJP leaders sought to reassure Hindu refugees that they could seek citizenship under the CAA. The Supreme Court in May 2026 upheld the Commission's power to conduct the exercise and to verify citizenship status (see Supreme Court review).

=== Allegations in West Bengal SIR ===
In West Bengal, the "micro-observers" appointed by the ECI alleged that EROs were not deleting ineligible electors and were uploading improper documents. Frontline reported that districts with large Muslim populations, such as Malda and Murshidabad, were particularly affected by deletions (see West Bengal SIR). Following BJP victory of West Bengal Legislative Assembly elections after its SIR, various organizations have analyzed SIR and election data based on SIR removal pattern disproportionately affected Muslim, women and minority populations considered to be aligned to vote for TMC, and deleted voters under appeal process vastly exceeding victory margins. Although incumbency sentiment against the TMC is considered to have a substantial role in its loss of elections, analysis of SIR data by The Scroll, Newslaundry, The Print, and Civic Research Group, suggest that SIR could have also played a significant role whereas analysis by The Times of India, found the evidence to be inconclusive and analysis by Hindustan Times, concluded negative. Many voters that were excluded from the elections were included back on voter list as their appeals were granted in court, with a success rate of over 90% as of September 2026.

=== Allegations of dissent within the Election Commission ===
The Indian Express published investigative report documenting objections raised by election commissioners Sukhbir Singh Sandhu and Vivek Joshi to several SIR-related decisions leading to larger controversy over alleged unilateral decision making by the Chief Election Commissioner (CEC), Gyanesh Kumar, and allegation of the SIR benefiting the ruling BJP government. The dissenting topics include against changes made to voter registration form without legal authority to do so, software integrity of recently introduced centralized software ECINet, alleged filing of appeals against 2026 West Bengal SIR voter restoration following judicial intervention of the process, and concerns of centralization, transparency and protection of voter database.

The Chief Election Commissioner and the BJP have denied the allegation as false or misleading and denied the revision benefiting the ruling party. The allegations placed in the article is under review by the Supreme Court. Since October 2026, anti-CEC protests are on-going in several cities, demanding the resignation of the CEC, Gyanesh Kumar and the halting of the SIR.

=== Allegations about earlier revisions and precedent ===
==== Terminology and legal basis ====
Petitioners before the Supreme Court argued that the name "special intensive revision" was an attempt to override the statute and rules, which in their view favour inclusion over deletion. Writing in The News Minute, Shivasundar noted that the 1960 rules, under which the ECI normally operates, make no mention of a "Special Intensive Revision", and stated that the ECI told the Supreme Court it had conducted an SIR in Bihar in 2003 but could not provide evidence for the claim.

==== The 2002–03 revision ====
Critics of the 2025 exercise disputed the ECI's reliance on the 2003 precedent. The 2003 order itself was reported to be absent from the Commission's website and from web archives; the ECI did not attach it to its affidavit and, in response to a Right to Information application, pointed instead to its June 2025 order. Citing the Commission's own records, critics argued that the 2003 press note emphasised public scrutiny of the rolls in local-body meetings and did not mention any requirement of citizenship proof, and a former Chief Electoral Officer associated with the revision said that enumerators were not told to seek proof of citizenship from existing electors, being mainly to verify age and ordinary residence. ADR submitted that citizenship evidence in 2003 was sought only from a small segment of the population in specified areas, and cited paragraph 75 of the 2003 guidelines, under which no elector already on the roll could be subjected to citizenship verification unless someone objected, in which case the burden of proof lay with the objector.

==== Lal Babu Hussein as precedent ====
Petitioners against the 2025 Bihar SIR cited Lal Babu Hussein as the main precedent, arguing that it placed the burden of displacing a presumption of eligibility on the authority rather than on the elector. The ECI argued in 2026 that the case was distinguishable, since it had been decided against the background of an earlier revision in which citizenship was presumed to have been verified, and since the exercise there had been conducted by the police. In its May 2026 judgment the Supreme Court likewise distinguished Lal Babu Hussein as concerned with adjudicatory proceedings against individual electors.

==== The 2015 Aadhaar-linking programme ====
HuffPost India reviewed Aadhaar-linked rolls from the 2015 NERPAP and described the programme as a controversial drive to flag names for deletion whose launch and winding-down were poorly handled. The Wire reported discrepancies in the seeding figures, for example in Maharashtra, where about 301,000 voters had been registered for the programme by early May 2015 while the state's chief electoral officer claimed 1.8 million by August. In response to a Right to Information request, the ECI stated that no voter ID cards were deleted under NERPAP because of non-linking of Aadhaar.

==== Continuity versus break ====
Commentators have drawn on this history to argue both that the 2025 SIR is unprecedented and that it follows precedent. Writing in the Supreme Court Observer, Debjani M argued that intensive revisions, citizenship anxieties and hurried timelines were not new, but that earlier revisions operated on a presumption in favour of preserving the existing roll, with the burden on the objector and deletions on citizenship grounds permitted only on positive proof from the competent authority and after a fair hearing; by contrast, she argued, the SIR shifted the burden of proof onto electors, dispensed with prior house-to-house verification of existing entries, compressed the appeal window and proceeded de novo. The Wire reported that the ECI took double the time for the 2003 revision that it allowed in 2025.

== See also ==
- Association for Democratic Reforms v. Election Commission of India
- Illegal immigration to India
- Illegal Migrants (Determination by Tribunals) Act, 1983
- 2026 Election Controversy in India
- Voter ID (India)
- Sixty-first Amendment of the Constitution of India

== Bibliography ==
- Electoral Rolls Special Revision of Intensive Nature with Qualifying Date 01.01.2003: Final Guidelines (PDF), Election Commission of India, 1 May 2002 – via votefordemocracy.org.in
- Manual on Electoral Rolls (PDF), Election Commission of India, March 2023
- Ahuja, Amit; Ostermann, Susan, "The Election Commission of India: Guardian of Democracy" (PDF), in Arjen Boin; Lauren A. Fahy; Paul ‘t Hart (eds.), Guardians of Public Value: How Public Organisations Become and Remain Institutions, Palgrave MacMillan, ISBN 978-3-030-51700-7
- Bora, Banasmita (2024), "The Election Commission of India and Its Evolution", in Šumit Ganguly; Eswaran Sridharan (eds.), The Oxford Handbook of Indian Politics, doi:10.1093/oxfordhb/9780198894261.013.10
- Roy, Anupama (2012), "Identifying Citizens: Electoral Rolls, the Right to Vote, and the Election Commission of India", Election Law Journal, 11 (2), doi:10.1089/elj.2011.0124
- Singh, Ujjwal Kumar; Roy, Anupama (2026), "Supreme Court and the SIR: An Analysis of Association for Democratic Reforms v Election Commission of India", Social Change: 1–18, doi:10.1177/00490857261479528
- Yadav, Yogendra; Mathur, Arnav; Ahuja, Angad (22 September 2026). Special Intensive Revision. Law and Other Things (LAOT). YouTube.
