= 2026 West Bengal election controversies =

Controversies related to the 2026 West Bengal Legislative Assembly election

- Date: 2026
- Location: West Bengal, India
- Participants: Bharatiya Janata Party, All India Trinamool Congress, Election Commission of India
- Outcome: Political controversy regarding voter roll revisions, allegations of EVM tampering and post-election violence
- Website: eci.gov.in

The 2026 West Bengal election controversies refers to allegations and disputes surrounding the 2026 West Bengal Legislative Assembly election, including claims of voter intimidation, voter roll irregularities, Electronic Voting Machine (EVM) tampering, and election violence.

Many BJP supporters, including village women, alleged threats from the local ruling party, Trinamool Congress (TMC) workers. A full repoll was ordered in the Falta constituency after complaints that ruling AITC (TMC) party workers tampered with EVMs.

In May 2026, the Supreme Court of India upheld the legality of the Special Intensive Revision (SIR) voter-roll revision conducted by the Election Commission (ECI). Earlier, several parties, including the TMC, alleged that many voters were unfairly removed during the revision of electoral rolls as part of a SIR exercise.

While the losing Chief Minister, Mamata Banerjee, alleged manipulation by central agencies, many other leaders noted that the defeat of TMC was due to its misrule filled with corruption, political violence, and violence against women, such as the rape of female student at R. G. Kar medical college in 2024.

== Background ==
The 2026 West Bengal Legislative Assembly election resulted in a major victory for the Bharatiya Janata Party (BJP) which won more than two-thirds of the seats in the assembly and ended the 15-year rule of the All India Trinamool Congress (TMC) government led by Mamata Banerjee.

The election was marked by several controversies and allegations related to the conduct of the electoral process, including claims of voter roll irregularities, EVM tampering, poll violence, and political intimidation by rival parties. Following the announcement of the results, post-election violence and vandalism were reported from multiple districts across West Bengal. Both the BJP and TMC accused each other of political attacks and intimidation.

== Voter intimidation ==
During the 2026 West Bengal state election campaign, BJP leaders complained that their voters were being intimidated by the TMC workers, especially in the Diamond Harbor constituencies, such as by Falta TMC candidate Jahangir Khan and his team.

On May 2, 2026, hundreds of villagers protested in Falta in West Bengal’s South 24 Parganas district, alleging they were receiving life threats from TMC workers in the area. Many BJP supporters alleged that TMC’s Israfil Chowkidar, a close associate of TMC candidate Jahangir Khan, issued threats against them.

After the protests by locals in the Falta area alleging threats from TMC leaders, central security forces, including CRPF personnel, were deployed to ensure the safety of voters. Election observer and police officer Ajay Pal Sharma issued a stern warning and visited the house of Jahangir Khan, who was accused of threatening voters not to vote for BJP. TMC leaders supported Jahangir Khan and blamed Sharma of intimidating their party workers.

In urban centers, mainly Kolkata metropolis, the Election Commission set up new booths in housing complexes to avoid voter intimidation by ruling TMC party goons, as alleged in previous elections, where there were cases of such high rises and complexes being locked up by mobs linked to the ruling party TMC, during the elections, as they were seen as likely BJP voters. The ruling TMC (AITC) party continuously opposed setting up of such booths.

== Voter roll revision controversy ==
Several parties, particularly the TMC, alleged that large numbers of voters were removed during the revision of electoral rolls as part of a Special Intensive Revision (SIR) exercise. Other acquisitions include bulk submission of form-6 for new voters before election, allegedly from other states and in support of BJP.

The ECI decided to appoint central government employees, "micro-observers", specific to the West Bengal SIR, to supervise ERO hearings, which decide on objections raised to draft voter rolls before the final roll is issued. The micro-observers had veto powers in ERO hearings. The ECI also deployed its centralized software, ECINet, to digitize enumeration form submissions and check for 'logical discrepancies', including spelling variations, age/relationship mismatches and residence which was criticized for being arbitrarily implemented. All individuals with 'logical discrepancies' had to appear before a hearing with ERO similar to unmapped voters, although there were allegedly mechanisms for quick resolution of LDs. The ECI has not published specifications, threshold or audit of the algorithms used in LD and had on different occassions malfunctioned, and in one instance causing temporary pause on ERO hearings. The ECI undertook digitization of previous SIR rolls through OCR as well as transliteration from Bangla to english, after which it is alleged to have generated mass reports on behalf of EROs for review.

Mamata Banerjee, challenged legality of SIR process in Supreme Court. She alleged that ECI had not responded to any of her letters, questioned legality of selectively carrying out different procedure in her state, argued that majority of micro-observers were selected from BJP ruling states and expressed concern that bundles of objections of inclusion of voters were being filed anonymously without objectors required to be present for ERO hearings. Banerjee also argued that muslim majority districts such as Murshidabad and Matua voters were disproportionately affected by the voter list revision process. The ECI claimed that it had enforced micro-observers as state was non-compliant in providing officers for the SIR process, which was disputed by the state that ECI side-lined the officers it provided. It was claimed that the ECI had introduced Special Roll Observers, who were reviewing ERO cleared voters and sending them back and that form-6 was not being processed in West Bengal at all. Recognizing this as "trust deficit" between state and the ECI, the Supreme court transferred adjudication process to the judiciary directing a selection of judicial officers from the Calcutta high court responsible for hearing appeals and finalizing the voter list.

After review of logical discrepancy of 6 million remaining under logical discrepancy, 2.7 million were removed from the voter rolls in draft rolls. Against this, 2.2 million appeals were filed by deleted voters for inclusion or 82% of deleted names and 1.6 million appeals against voter inclusion in the appellate tribunals setup by the Supreme Court. Voter rolls for West Bengal Legislative assembly elections were frozen on 16 April 2026, but since the appellate tribunal was disposing cases, the Supreme Court applied constitutional powers under Article 142 to publish "supplementary revised electoral roll" of cleared voters on 21 for first phase and on 27 April for second phase, two days ahead of the respective dates for polling. Only 139 out of 657 disposed cases appeared on the first phase list, and 1,468 out of 1,474 disposed cases appeared on second phase list, while remaining were unable to cast votes. Although strong incumbency sentiment against the TMC is considered to have a substantial role in its loss of elections to the BJP, several organization conducted analysis of SIR data on the grounds that disproportionate removal of Muslim and minority voters, and appeals against exclusion exceeding winning margins in 29 of its constituencies could affect election results. Analysis of SIR data by The Scroll, Newslaundry, The Print, and Civic Research Group, suggest that SIR could have also played a significant role whereas analysis by The Times of India, found the evidence to be inconclusive and analysis by Hindustan Times, concluded negative.

In August, the Supreme Court emphasized that appeals against voter exclusions had more priority than appeals against voter inclusions, especially since over 90% of the decided appeals were in favor of excluded voters. Of 3.8 million appeals, 3.7 million were pending as of September 2026, when it became the larger part of the national issue concerning 2026 Election Controversy in India following an expose by The Indian Express that election commissioners had dissented mass appeals against voter inclusion allegedly filed under ECI's name.

A public code audit by Charchagram was done on the officials' ECINet portal on October 2, 6, 7 and 9. Investigations on the login page's JavaScript file showed labels, menu names, screen routes and API paths that should only be accessible after logging in. Features revealed from the script file include an option given to the State Nodal Officers (SNOs) to disable access to an officer's ECINet account. Also, in the code examined, two sections were hidden from West Bengal's EROs and AEROs, viz. the section on voter's enumeration form details and the section on notices and hearings; the latter concerned with voter inclusions on the electoral roll. In the screen "View Documents in Enumeration Form", some voters were tagged as "VIPs". Lists of such "VIP" voters could be downloaded, filtering on the basis of state, district, constituency, and polling "part" number. The criteria of a voter being "VIP" remains unknown from the audit.

On 16th October 2026, an RTI filed to the ECI on 27th July 2026 was answered. It denied disclosing the name and version the technology that was used to detect errors and inconsistencies in the voter data, citing Section 8(1)(d) of RTI Act, 2005, and also stating that no new software was developed or procured for the SIR exercise. It also denied "clarifying" whether the system uses automatic flagging, what safeguards there are against false positives, and the workflow in general, citing Section 2(f) of the RTI Act, 2005. Also, regarding who reviews flagged anomalies, the ECI denied information, citing Section 8(1)(g) of the RTI Act.

== EVM allegations ==
A full repoll was ordered in the Falta Assembly constituency in 2026, after complaints that the ruling AITC (TMC) party workers associated with their candidate, Jahangir Khan, tampered with voting by putting tapes on the BJP candidate's name on the Electronic Voting Machine (EVM), to prevent any votes being cast in favor of the BJP.

The TMC also accused the BJP and election authorities of irregularities involving EVMs. Allegations were made regarding the handling of EVM strongrooms in Kolkata before vote counting.

Around 4000 EVMs were gutted after a fire broke out at the strongroom in the New Administrative Building at the collectorate in Alipore, South 24 Parganas district on June 10, 2026. Preliminary findings stated that the fire had started on the second, third or fourth floors and spread to the eighth and ninth floors, where the EVMs had been stored, while the intervening floors had suffered minimal damage. The strongroom housed EVMs linked with 10 assembly constituencies in the Alipore Subdivision. Allegations made by both the TMC and the BJP leaders focused on sabotage and conspiracy, respectively.

== Pre-poll and post-poll violence ==
Violence against women was a recurring issue during the election campaign, especially due to the 2024 R. G. Kar Medical College and Hospital rape and murder case, which remained part of the wider law and order debate before the election.

Following the declaration of results, reports of political clashes and violence emerged from several districts of West Bengal. Political parties blamed each other for intimidation and attacks on party workers.

On the night of 6 May 2026, assailants on bikes fatally shot BJP leader Suvendu Adhikari's personal assistant Chandranath Rath.

== Reactions ==
CPI(M) State General Secretary Mohammed Salim in his press release stated: "The results clearly indicate that the people have mandated against the TMC’s limitless corruption, autocratic rule, and misgovernance."

Former Chief Minister, Mamata Banerjee described the election outcome as a "murder of democracy" and alleged manipulation by central agencies. Congress leader, Rahul Gandhi described the BJP’s victory in West Bengal assembly elections as a “theft” of the popular mandate.

State Congress president, Subhankar Sarkar said that the defeat of TMC was due to its misrule filled with corruption, political violence, and violence against women which include heinous crimes like the R. G. Kar rape case.

== See also ==
- 2021 West Bengal post-poll violence
- 2025 Indian electoral controversy
- 2026 Election Controversy in India
