= Ritika Chopra =

Indian journalist

- Education: St. Xavier's College, Kolkata
- Occupation: Journalist
- Years active: 2006–present
- Employer: The Indian Express
- Awards: International Press Institute India Award (2020); Ramnath Goenka Excellence in Journalism Award (2021); Chameli Devi Jain Award for Outstanding Women Mediapersons (2024)

Ritika Chopra is an Indian journalist. She is associated with The Indian Express.

== Early life ==
Chopra was born in Kolkata, in the Indian state of West Bengal. She studied at St. Xavier's College, Kolkata, where she obtained bachelor's degree in Mass Communication and Videography.

== Career ==
Chopra started her journalism career in 2006 with Hindustan Times in Kolkata. In 2007, She moved to New Delhi and worked on politics, education, social issues. She also worked with Mail Today and The Economic Times. Chopra joined in The Indian Express in 2015. She has reported extensively on the Election Commission of India, the Central government and public policy issues. In September 2026, she triggered a massive nationwide debate with multi part investigative series revealing that two Election Commissioners had objected on record 14 times in 10 months over being kept in the dark regarding crucial systemic actions, such as voter list modifications.

== Awards ==
- Laadli Media Award (2018)
- International Press Institute's India Award (2020).
- Ramnath Goenka Excellence in Journalism Award (2021)
- Chameli Devi Jain Award for Outstanding Women Mediapersons (2024)
