= Chief Election Commissioner and Other Election Commissioners (Appointment, Conditions of Service and Term of Office) Act, 2023 =

Indian Legislation

Chief Election Commissioner and other Election Commissioners (Appointment, Conditions of Service and Term of Office) Act, 2023

Parliament of India
- Long title: An Act to regulate the appointment, conditions of service and term of office of the Chief Election Commissioner and other Election Commissioners, the procedure for transaction of business by the Election Commission and for matters connected therewith or incidental thereto.
- Citation: Act No. 49 of 2023
- Territorial extent: India
- Passed by: Rajya Sabha
- Passed: 12 December 2023
- Passed by: Lok Sabha
- Passed: 21 December 2023
- Assented to by: President of India
- Assented to: 28 December 2023
- Commenced: 2 January 2024

Legislative history

Initiating chamber: Rajya Sabha
- Bill title: Chief Election Commissioner and other Election Commissioners (Appointment, Conditions of Service and Term of Office) Bill, 2023
- Bill citation: Bill No. 57 of 2023
- Introduced by: Arjun Ram Meghwal
- Introduced: 10 August 2023
- Passed: 12 December 2023
- Voting summary: Majority Voice voted for; Minority Voice voted against

Revising chamber: Lok Sabha
- Passed: 21 December 2023
- Voting summary: Majority Voice voted for; Minority Voice voted against

Final stages
- Finally passed both chambers: 21 December 2023

Repeals
- Election Commission (Conditions of Service of Election Commissioners and Transaction of Business) Act, 1991

Related cases
- Anoop Baranwal vs Union of India (Writ Petition (Civil) No.104 of 2015)
- Status: In force

The Chief Election Commissioner and other Election Commissioners (Appointment, Conditions of Service and Term of Office) Act, 2023 is an Act of the Parliament of India that replaced the previous Election Commission (Conditions of Service of Election Commissioners and Transaction of Business) Act, 1991.

The legislation was listed to be taken up for discussion during the Parliament Special Session, 2023.

== History ==
The Election Commission (ECI) is composed of the chief election commissioner (CEC) and other (number determined by the president) additional election commissioners (ECs) appointed by the president of India under the provision Article 324 of the Constitution.

In 1991, the Parliament passed the Election Commission (Conditions of Service of Election Commissioners and Transaction of Business) Act, 1991 which fixed the number of election commissioners besides the CEC to two, set the salary and tenure of CEC and ECs, and established that cases of difference of opinion should be decided by majority vote. Until 1993, the ECI operated as a single member body, except for a two month period during which it operated as three-member body. Following the formation of a three member body in 1993, the CEC, T.N. Seshan challenged the structure of ECI in the Supreme Court which resulted in an amendment to the 1991 law that fixed the number of election commissioners besides the CEC to two, set the salary and tenure of CEC and ECs, established equality of power between CEC and ECs, and required that cases of difference of opinion should be decided by majority vote.

However, it did not prescribe any changes to the appointment process which continued to be decided by the president, effectively on advice of the prime minister. In January 2015, a PIL case, Anoop Baranwal vs Union of India, was filed alleging that this unilateral executive control undermined independence of the ECI and that article 324 placed expectation on the Parliament to draft a law to appoint CEC and ECs which was not in place. The court scrutinized selection process of the CEC, Arun Goel, and emphasized the need for Parliament to draft a law. The court examined reports submitted by expert bodies as well as previous unimplemented electoral reform recommendations such as Dinesh Goswami committee (1990), National Commission to Review the Working of the Constitution Report (2002) and the Law Commission (2015). The Court applied article 32 and 142 to pass an interim on March 2023, self limiting direction until the Parliament enacts a selection procedure, that the posts of EC and CEC shall be made by the President based on recommendation of a selection committee composed of the Prime Minister, the Chief Justice, and Leader of Opposition. The Chief Election Commissioner and other Election Commissioners (Appointment, Conditions of Service and Term of Office) Act, 2023 was passed in December 2023, to meet the requirement prescribed by the ruling, however, by replacing the Chief Justice of India with a PM nominated Cabinet Minister, it effectively gave the ruling government majority control on the selection of election commissioners. No election commissioner has been appointed through the interim selection committee.

== Proposals ==
The proposed legislation stipulates that the appointment of the CEC and other ECs shall be made by the President, based on the recommendations of a Selection Committee – consisting of a chairperson (the prime minister) and members (leader of Opposition Party and one PM nominated Union Cabinet minister).

The 1991 act stipulates that the remuneration of the election commissioners shall be equal to that of a Supreme Court judge. The bill, on the other hand, proposes that the salary, allowances, and terms of service of the CEC and other ECs shall be identical to those of the Cabinet secretary. The proposed bill ensures the re-appointment of the CEC and other ECs shall not be deemed eligible, restricting their tenure to only one term. It also overturned the Supreme Court verdict in which Supreme Court ordered the constitution of a committee composed of the prime minister of India, leader of Opposition in Lok Sabha and the chief justice of India Most of other provisions in the 1991 legislature remains same.

== Reactions ==
To be regarded as equivalent to the Cabinet secretary denotes a lower status than that of a minister of state (MoS). The Election Commission might find it difficult to take disciplinary actions against politicians above their hierarchy (example - Cabinet ministers). Being a constitution body, the procedure of removing a serving CEC or EC is same as that of a judicial officer, as it was in 1991 legislation. ECs can be removed on recommendation of the CEC, which makes dissent structurally risky. However, the "service conditions" is downgraded to that of a bureaucratic officer.

Exclusion of the chief justice of India (CJI) from selection process amounts to overturning a previous verdict of the Public Interest Litigation (PIL) case, Anoop Baranwal vs Union of India, as it gives the ruling government majority power over selection of election commissioners which was the precedent challenged in the case. The new changes in the legislation have not adequately anticipated a structure in which the Election Commission can fulfill its duties without apprehension, bias, or coercion from the governing body or the ruling political faction. Additionally dissent notes are not required to be recorded in orders, which was a point of contention within the ECI in 2019, when election commissioner, Ashok Lavasa began boycotting Model Code of Conduct meetings as his dissent against giving clearing BJP from MCC complaints were not being recorded. The 2023 act is criticized for not addressing gaps in internal functioning of the ECI, which became more relevant following the 2026 CEC row.

== See also ==
- 2025 Indian electoral controversy
- 2026 Indian electoral controversy
