= Vivek Joshi =

Election Commissioner of India

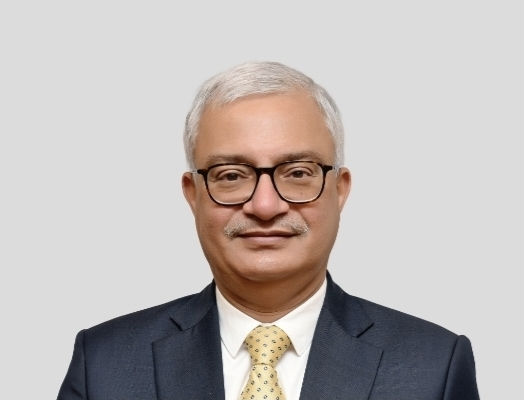

Election Commissioner of India
- Incumbent
- Assumed office 19 February 2025 Serving with Sukhbir Singh Sandhu
- Preceded by: Gyanesh Kumar

Chief Secretary of Haryana
- In office 1 November 2024 – 18 February 2025
- Governor: Bandaru Dattatreya
- Chief Minister: Nayab Singh Saini
- Preceded by: T. V. S. N. Prasad
- Succeeded by: Anurag Rastogi

Personnel Secretary of India
- In office 19 August 2024 – 31 October 2024
- Appointed by: Appointments Committee of the Cabinet
- Preceded by: S. Radha Chauhan
- Succeeded by: Rachna Shah

Financial Services Secretary of India
- In office 1 December 2022 – 18 August 2024
- Preceded by: Sanjay Malhotra
- Succeeded by: Nagaraju Maddirala

Registrar General and Census Commissioner of India
- In office 20 January 2019 – 31 October 2022
- Preceded by: Sailesh
- Succeeded by: Mritunjay Kumar Naraya

Personal details
- Born: 21 May 1966 (age 60) Uttar Pradesh, India
- Education: IIT Roorkee; IIFT; Graduate Institute of International and Development Studies
- Occupation: Civil servant

Vivek Joshi (born 21 May 1966) is a retired IAS officer from the 1989 batch of the Haryana cadre who is currently serving as one of the two Election Commissioners of India since February 19, 2025. He previously served as the Chief Secretary of Haryana state from 1 November 2024 till 18 February 2025. Previously, he served as Personnel Secretary of India from 19 August 2024 till 31 October 2024. Before that, he served as Secretary of the Department of Financial Services.

== Early life ==
Joshi was born on 21 May 1966 in Uttar Pradesh, India. His younger brother is Vineet Joshi, an IAS officer of the 1992 batch.

== Education ==
Joshi received Bachelor's degree in Mechanical Engineering from IIT Roorkee and He then earned a postgraduate diploma in International Business from the IIFT, New Delhi. afterwards He earned Degree of M.A and Ph.D both in Internal Economics from Graduate Institute of International and Development Studies.
