= Joymalya Bagchi =

Judge of the Supreme Court of India

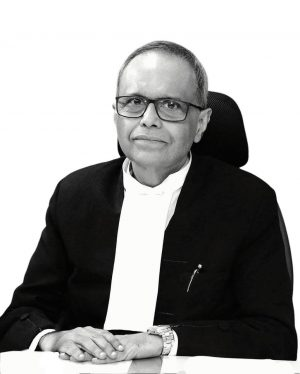

Judge of the Supreme Court of India
- Incumbent
- Assumed office 17 March 2025
- Nominated by: Sanjiv Khanna
- Appointed by: Droupadi Murmu

Judge of the Calcutta High Court
- In office 8 November 2021 – 16 March 2025
- Nominated by: N. V. Ramana
- Appointed by: Ram Nath Kovind
- In office 27 June 2011 – 4 January 2021
- Nominated by: S. H. Kapadia
- Appointed by: Pratibha Patil

Judge of the Andhra Pradesh High Court
- In office 4 January 2021 – 8 November 2021
- Nominated by: Sharad Arvind Bobde
- Appointed by: Ram Nath Kovind

Personal details
- Born: 3 October 1966 (age 60) Calcutta, West Bengal, India
- Education: Calcutta Boys' School Department of Law, University of Calcutta (LLB)
- Occupation: Lawyer, Judge

Joymalya Bagchi (born 3 October 1966) is an Indian jurist from West Bengal, serving as a Judge of the Supreme Court of India since 17 March 2025. He served as a judge of the Calcutta High Court from November 2021 till March 2025 and is in line to become the Chief Justice of India in 2031.

== Birth and education ==
Bagchi was born on 3 October 1966 in Calcutta, West Bengal. His father was a lawyer and his mother a health professional. He studied at Calcutta Boys' School and later graduated in law from Calcutta University in 1991.

== Career ==
Bagchi was an advocate affiliated with West Bengal Bar Association since 1991. He successfully argued before a special bench of the Calcutta High Court against the West Bengal government’s ban on Dwikhondito, a book authored by Bangladeshi writer Taslima Nasreen.

He was appointed as permanent judge of the High Court at Calcutta on 27 June 2011. He was transferred to Andhra Pradesh High Court briefly from January till November 2021, and later repatriated to Calcutta High Court on 8 November 2021. Justice Bagchi headed the sub-committee on National Framework for Court Excellence which drafted the Baseline Report on National Framework for Court Excellence in 2024.

Justice Bagchi in his judicial career has delivered various impactful judgments which have shaped progressive legal standards and reinforced the principles of justice and fairness. In Bijoy vs. State of West Bengal, he issued pivotal directives to protect fundamental rights and dignity of child victims, a decision later made a part of the Supreme Court judgment in Nipun Saxena vs. Union of India. In State of West Bengal vs. Sangita Sahu, he issued directives to prevent secondary victimization in immoral trafficking cases, setting up Anti-Human Trafficking Units (AHTUs) for efficient case handling and prompt release of victim compensation. His ruling in Kalu SK & Ors mandated videography of narcotics seizures, enhancing law enforcement transparency, a measure subsequently incorporated as a requirement for searches in Bharatiya Nagarik Suraksha Sanhita, 2023. Further exemplifying his commitment to speedy justice, Justice Bagchi in Bibekananda Pramanik vs. State of West Bengal introduced crucial measures to expedite trials by ensuring prompt examination of public witnesses through maintenance of witness registers in public offices and use of video conferencing. In Muzaffar Ahamed Rather vs. State of West Bengal, he demonstrated a humanistic approach in sentencing the ‘foot soldiers’ in terrorist organizations.

Beyond courtroom responsibilities, Justice Bagchi has made significant contributions to legal education and institutional leadership. He has held several responsible posts, including Executive Chairman of the Andhra Pradesh State Legal Services Authority, Member of the National Court Management Systems Committee (Chairperson of National Framework on Court Excellence), Chairperson of the West Bengal Judicial Academy's Governing Body, and Member of the General Council of the West Bengal National University of Juridical Sciences. His academic involvement extends to lecturing at multiple universities and participating in judicial education programs, both in National Judicial Academy and various State Judicial Academies. An internationally recognized legal professional, Justice Bagchi has participated in judicial exchange programs and conferences across United States, Europe, Africa, and Asia.

Justice Bagchi was ranked as eleventh in the seniority of all-India combined High Court judges, including the chief justices when he was recommended for elevation as judge of the Supreme Court of India. He was recommended on 6 March 2025 by collegium of the Supreme Court of India to be appointed as a judge of the Supreme Court. One of the reasons cited by the collegium was that the High Court at Calcutta has not had a Chief Justice of India since 2013. He assumed office on 17 March 2025.
