= Janpratinidhi =

Online social networking service

- Company type: NGO
- Website type: Social networking service
- Available in: Multilingual (10)
- Founded: January 1, 2005 (21 years ago)
- Headquarters: New Delhi, India
- Area served: India (2004–05); Worldwide (2005–present)
- Industry: Internet
- Website: janpratinidhi.com
- Current status: Active

Janpratinidhi (IPA: [dʒ-n-pra-ti-ni-dhi]) is an online social networking service and news portal which acts as a bridge between voters and their elected representatives viz. MPs MLAs and councillors. The name comes from a universally used word in the Indian Subcontinent for people's representatives - Janpratinidhi.

With the help of interactive maps, data and infographics, the website offers history of all elected representatives and details about their respective constituencies, its culture, geography, tourism and local businesses.

It not only informs users about their assembly constituency but also provide updates concerning their elected representatives, their assembly performance, development schemes and their progress. The portal promises a secure platform and a self-managed two-way communication system to every elected representative, through which a registered leader may manage its constituency, redress grievances and manage election campaigns.

== Organization ==
Janpratinidhi.com is a joint effort of a non-government organization SRISHTI and its technology partner Futuron Synergie Private Limited. Jitendra Varma, president of Srishti—the voluntary organization behind janpratinidhi.com says, "This platform is a judicious amalgamation of information technology and mobile telephony. It will enable leaders to connect with 80% of their electorates through IT and telecom."

== History ==
The work on the project began in 2008 and it took over two years for the team to compile the data and to create the algorithm. The portal was made available to public by the former Chief Election Commissioner of India Mr. S.Y. Quraishi at Constitution Club, New Delhi on August 29, 2013.

== Website ==
janpratinidhi.com is a combination of web interface, webcasts, call-centers, live streaming, web conferences, sample surveys, socio-economic indicators, social audits and social network powered feedback mechanisms.
