= Syed Nasim Ahmad Zaidi =

Chief election commissioner of India

Nasim Zaidi
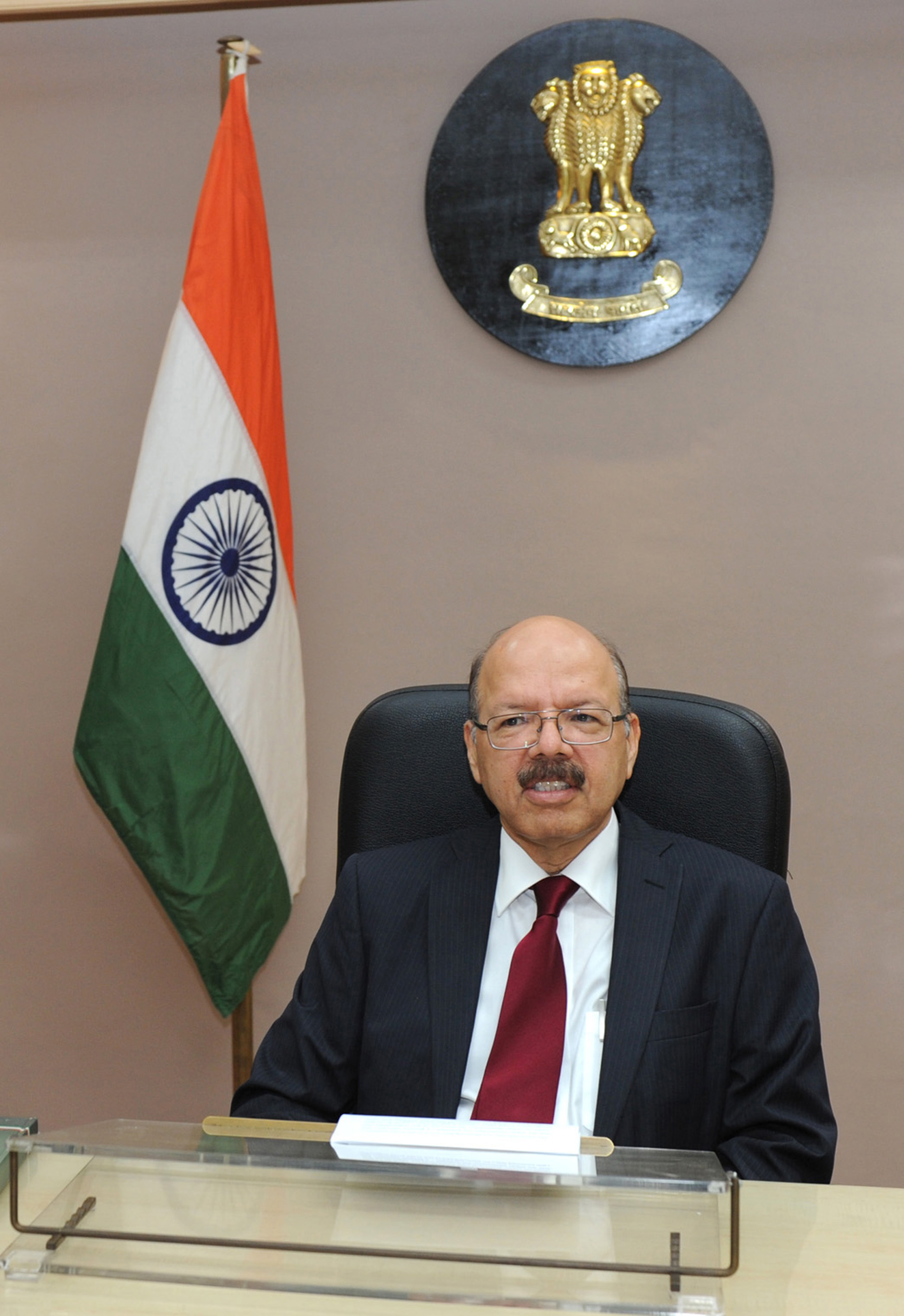

20th Chief Election Commissioner of India
- In office 18 April 2015 – 6 July 2017
- President: Pranab Mukherjee
- Prime Minister: Narendra Modi
- Preceded by: H. S. Brahma
- Succeeded by: Achal Kumar Jyoti

Election Commissioner of India
- In office 7 August 2012 – 18 April 2015
- President: Pranab Mukherjee

Personal details
- Born: Syed Nasim Ahmad Zaidi; 6 July 1952 (age 74) Dehradun, Uttar Pradesh (now Uttarakhand), India
- Education: Harvard University
- Profession: Civil servant

Syed Nasim Ahmad Zaidi served as the 20th Chief Election Commissioner of India. He is a retired I.A.S. officer of 1976 batch from the Muzzaffarnagar Uttar Pradesh cadre.

== Education ==
Zaidi possesses a master's degree in Public Administration from Kennedy School of Government, Harvard University and has been a Mason Fellow for Public Policy at Harvard Institute for International Development.

== Career ==
Dr. Zaidi has served as the Permanent Representative of India on the Council of ICAO from November 2005 to October 2008. He has served as the Director General of Civil Aviation. He retired from IAS as Secretary to the Government of India in Ministry of Civil Aviation on 31 July 2012. The first election in his tenure was 2015 Bihar Legislative Assembly election.
