= Sunil Arora =

23rd Chief Election Commissioner of India

- Sushil Arora
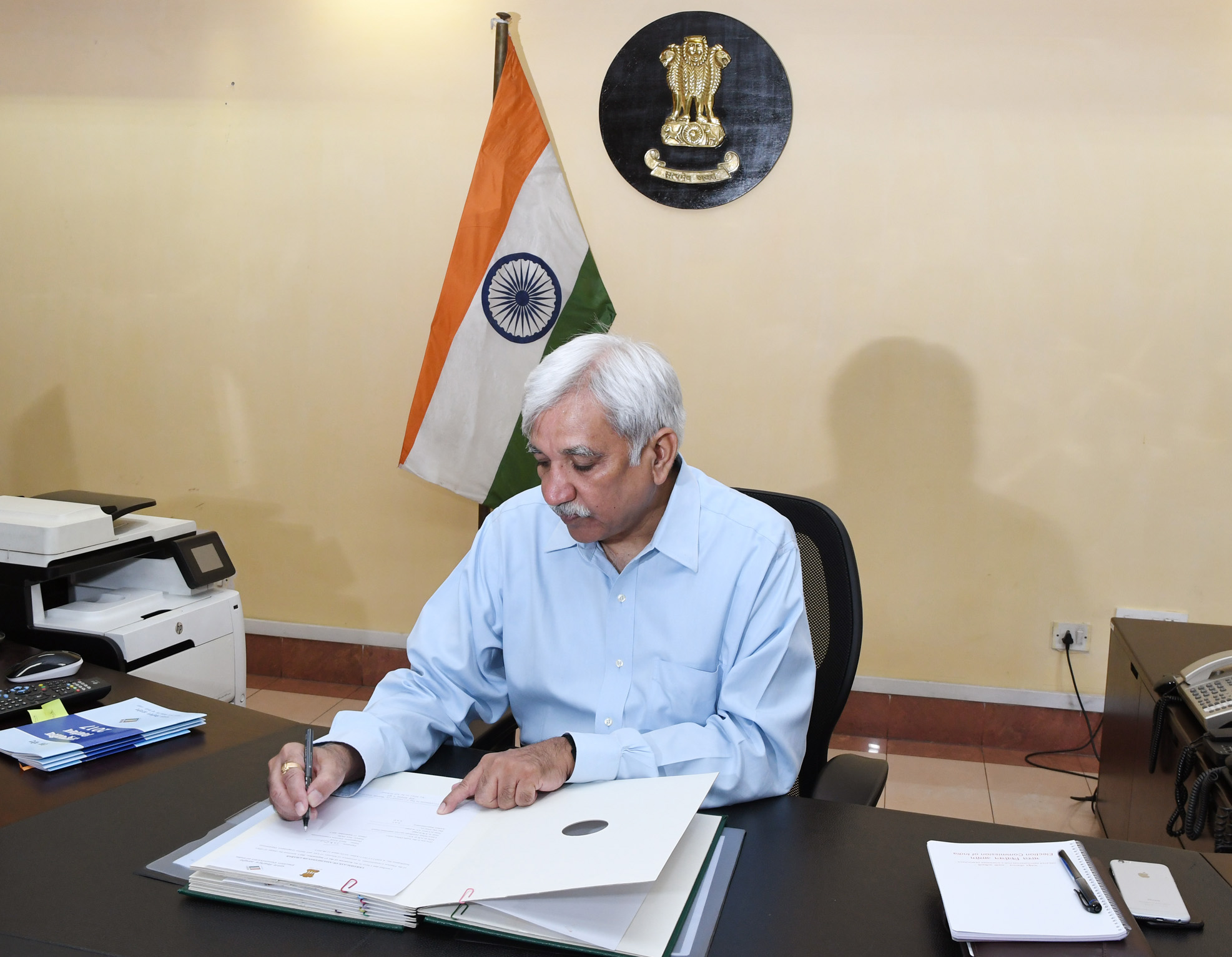

23rd Chief Election Commissioner of India
- In office 2 December 2018 – 12 April 2021
- President: Ram Nath Kovind
- Preceded by: Om Prakash Rawat
- Succeeded by: Sushil Chandra

Election Commissioner of India
- In office 1 September 2017 – 2 December 2018

Director General and CEO of Indian Institute of Corporate Affairs
- In office 19 December 2016 – 31 August 2017

Information and Broadcasting Secretary of India
- In office 31 August 2015 – 30 April 2016

Skill Development and Entrepreneurship Secretary of India
- In office 29 August 2014 – 30 August 2015

Personal details
- Born: 13 April 1956 (age 70) Hoshiarpur, Punjab, India
- Education: Panjab University (BA, MA)
- Occupation: Retired IAS Officer

Sunil Arora (born 13 April 1956) is a retired IAS officer of Rajasthan Cadre who served as the 23rd Chief Election Commissioner of India. He is also the chairman for Association of World Election Bodies (A-WEB). He also served as a secretary to the Government of India in two ministries.

== Personal life ==
Of his two brothers, one is also an IAS officer, whereas, the other is a diplomat from the Indian Foreign Service.

== Education ==
Arora has graduate (BA Honours) and postgraduate (MA) degrees in English from Panjab University in the Union Territory of Chandigarh.

== Career ==
=== Before IAS ===
Before being appointed as an IAS officer, Sunil Arora served as an associate professor in DAV College in Jalandhar.

=== As an IAS officer ===
As an IAS officer, Arora served in various key positions for both the Government of India and the Government of Rajasthan, including as the Additional Chief Secretary (Home), Principal Secretary (Small Industries), Principal Secretary (Investment and Protocol), Chairman and managing director of the Rajasthan State Industrial Development and Investment Corporation, Principal Secretary to the Chief Minister of Rajasthan, and as the district magistrate and collector of Jodhpur, Nagaur, Alwar and Dholpur districts in the Rajasthan Government, and as the Union Information and Broadcasting Secretary, Union Skill Development and Entrepreneurship Secretary, chairperson and managing director of the Indian Airlines, and as a joint secretary in the Ministry of Civil Aviation in the Indian government.

Arora superannuated from service on 30 April 2016. Post retirement, Arora was appointed the director general and chief executive officer of the Indian Institute of Corporate Affairs, and hence was deemed to have been re-employed into the IAS.

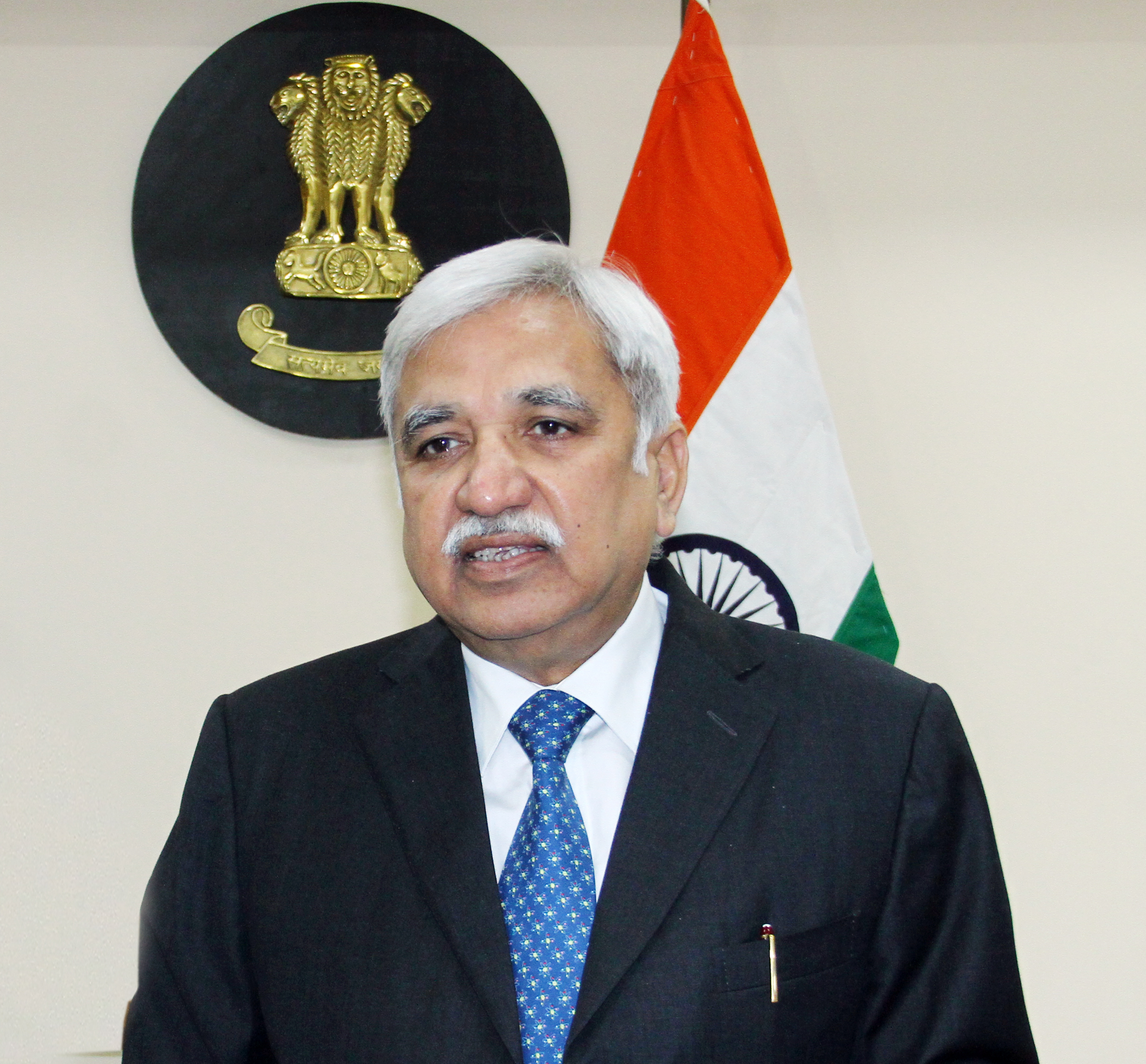

=== Election Commissioner of India ===
Arora assumed office as one of the two Election Commissioners of India on 31 August 2017, Arora assumed the office of Election Commissioner on 1 September 2017. During his tenure, 2019 Indian general election were held.

He has joined agri-tech start-up Gram Unnati as its non-executive chairman.
