= Harishankar Brahma =

19th Chief Election Commissioner of India

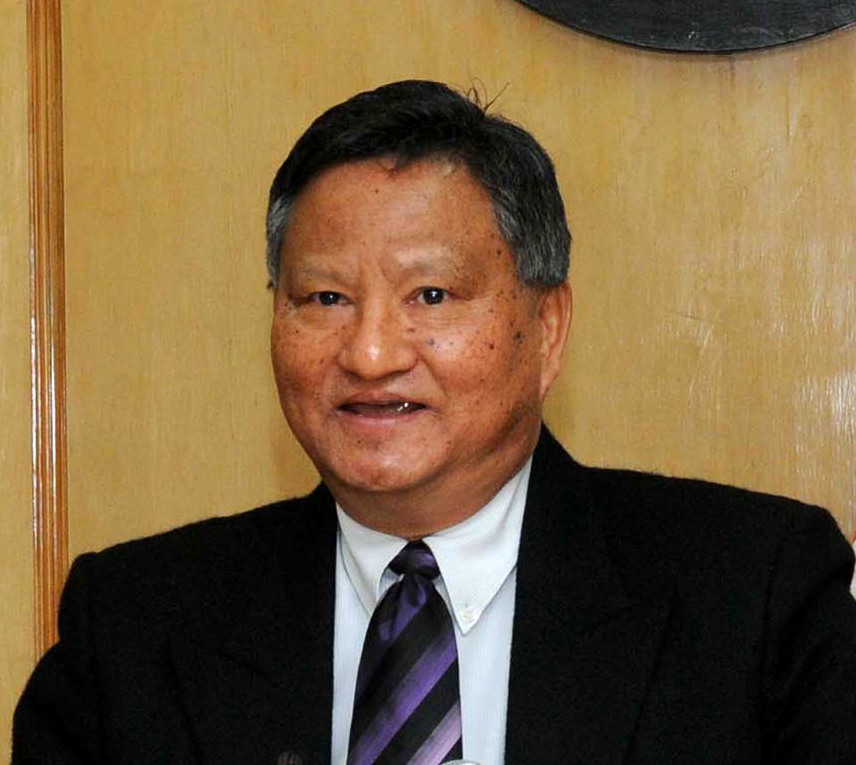

19th Chief Election Commissioner of India
- In office 16 January 2015 – 19 April 2015
- President: Pranab Mukherjee
- Prime Minister: Narendra Modi
- Preceded by: V. S. Sampath
- Succeeded by: Nasim Zaidi

Personal details
- Born: 19 April 1950 (age 76) Gossaigaon, Assam
- Education: St. Edmund's College, Shillong (BA); Gauhati University (MA)
- Profession: Civil servant

Harishankar Brahma (born 19 April 1950) served as the 19th Chief Election Commissioner of India. He is a retired I.A.S. officer of the 1975 batch of the Andhra Pradesh cadre.

Brahma, who retired as the Union Power Secretary in April 2010, held office till 18 April 2015. He is the second person from North-East India to become an Election Commissioner, after J. M. Lyngdoh.

== Early life and education ==
Born in a Bodo family in Gossaigaon, Kokrajhar district, Assam on 19 April 1950, he completed his post graduation in Political Science from Gauhati University and graduated from St. Edmund's College, Shillong. He did his schooling from Don Bosco School, Guwahati. He is a 1975 Indian Administrative Service officer belonging to the Andhra Pradesh cadre

== Career ==
Harishankar Brahma has held various senior level posts in the Government of India and State Government prior to the present posting. Before retiring as Secretary from the Ministry of Power, Shri Brahma held posts such as Joint Secretary (Border Management) for more than four years and completed almost all the border fencing and other border infrastructural work on Indo-Pak – Indo-Bangladesh border. He also worked as Special Secretary & Additional Secretary in National Disaster Management Authority (Ministry of Home Affairs). He was the Member-Secretary of the State Electricity Board, Andhra Pradesh and also worked as:

- District Collector & Magistrate for 4 years;
- Commissioner, Municipal Corporation of Hyderabad for 3 and a half years;
- Commissioner (Transport) & Ex-officio Secretary (Transport, Road & Building), Government of Andhra Pradesh for 2 and a half years;
- Commissioner & Ex-officio Secretary (Food, Civil Supplies & Consumer Affairs) for 5 years; and
- Principal Secretary (Environment, Forest, Science & Technology), Government of Andhra Pradesh.

He was appointed as the election commissioner in August 2010. He has overseen two Lok Sabha elections (2014) and at least one round of State Legislative Assembly elections in every state.

== Views on 2012 Assam violence ==
In an article in The Indian Express on 28 July 2012, he blamed illegal immigration from Bangladesh for the 2012 Assam violence. He mentioned that even the Election Commission is faced with this problem by saying, "Even the Election Commission of India is not immune to this problem. It has to tackle the problem of D-Voters (doubtful voters), numbering approximately 1.5 lakh, while preparing the electoral rolls of Assam. The subject matter is sub-judice. This also poses a very serious security threat to the country. It is advisable that these pending cases lying in various courts and tribunals be disposed of quickly and within a definite time frame. People who are found to be illegal migrants by these tribunals should be deported. Unless this basic issue of illegal migration into the country is resolved, the problem is bound to recur from time to time and in place to place."
