= Achal Kumar Jyoti =

21st Chief Election Commissioner of India

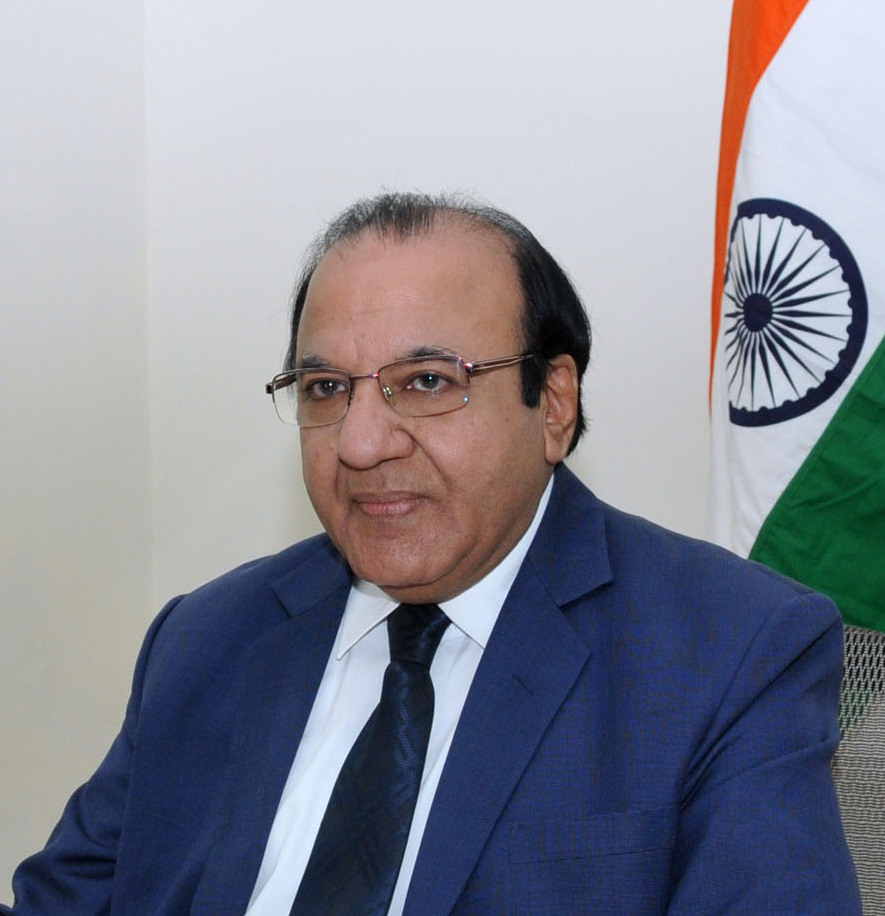

21st Chief Election Commissioner of India
- In office 6 July 2017 – 23 January 2018
- President: Pranab Mukherjee, Ram Nath Kovind
- Preceded by: Syed Nasim Ahmad Zaidi
- Succeeded by: Om Prakash Rawat

Election Commissioner of India
- In office 13 May 2015 – 5 July 2017
- President: Pranab Mukherjee
- Chief Election Commissioner: Syed Nasim Ahmad Zaidi

Chief Secretary of Gujarat
- In office 31 December 2009 – 31 January 2013
- Chief Minister: Narendra Modi

Personal details
- Born: Achal Kumar Jyoti; 23 January 1953 (age 73) Punjab, India
- Occupation: Retired IAS officer

Achal Kumar Jyoti (born 23 January 1953) is a retired 1975 IAS officer of Gujarat cadre who served as the 21st Chief Election Commissioner of India from 6 July 2017 to 23 January 2018.

== Education ==
Achal Kumar Jyoti has graduate (BSc) and postgraduate (MSc) degrees in Chemistry.

== Career ==
Apart from serving as the Chief Election Commissioner of India, Jyoti served as one of the Election Commissioners in the Election Commission of India before his appointment as the Chief Election Commissioner of India.

He has also served in key positions for both Gujarat and Union Governments, like as the Chief Secretary of Gujarat, Additional Chief Secretary (General Administration), Principal Secretary (Finance), managing director of Sardar Sarovar Narmada Nigam, Secretary (Industries), Secretary (Revenue), Secretary (Water Supplies) and as the District Magistrate and Collector of Kheda, Panchmahals, Surendranagar districts in Gujarat Government, and as the Chairman of Kandla Port Trust in the Union Government.

He's been involved in 16 state assembly elections as an election commissioner, including five as chief election commissioner and a presidential and a vice-presidential election.

== Controversies ==
During the elections to the legislative assemblies of Himachal Pradesh and Gujarat in November–December 2017, Jyoti delayed the announcement of the dates for the Gujarat election, despite that in 2012, the dates for both states were announced on the same day. Jyoti later clarified that flood relief work in Gujarat was the reason for delay. However, NDTV after speaking to the officials of the flood affected districts, found out that the flood relief work was completed weeks ago, and his claim was false.

During the Gujarat Assembly elections that were held in December 2017, the Election Commission of India (ECI) issued a notice to Rahul Gandhi for violating the model code of conduct, by appearing for an interview with a Gujarati News Channel. While the Indian National Congress claimed that ECI ignored the sitting prime minister, Narendra Modi along with Amit Shah (BJP Party chief) and Arun Jaitley (finance minister) for violating code of conduct on several occasions.
