= Navin Chawla =

Indian civil servant (1945–2025)

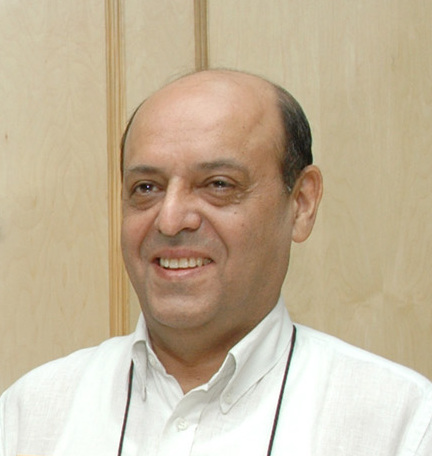
- Chawla in 2006

16th Chief Election Commissioner of India
- In office 21 April 2009 – 29 July 2010
- President: Pratibha Patil
- Prime Minister: Manmohan Singh
- Preceded by: N. Gopalaswami
- Succeeded by: S. Y. Quraishi

Personal details
- Born: 30 July 1945 New Delhi, British India
- Died: 1 February 2025 (aged 79) New Delhi, India
- Education: University of Delhi; University of London
- Occupation: Civil servant

Navin Chawla (30 July 1945 – 1 February 2025) was an Indian civil servant and writer, who served as 16th Chief Election Commissioner of India. Four phases (out of five) of the Indian general election to the Lok Sabha, the lower house of the Indian Parliament, were executed under his supervision in April and May 2009.

Chawla is best known for his biography of Mother Teresa and for conducting the 2009 general elections, despite concerns about his leanings towards the Congress Party. Action was taken against alleged malpractice by Congress governments in Rajasthan, Assam and Andhra Pradesh and the Congress-Allied government in Tamil Nadu. According to his family, Chawla was deeply influenced by Mother Teresa and decided not to resign from the civil service in 1997 in accordance with her advice.

== Early life and education ==
Chawla was born on 30 July 1945 in New Delhi. He studied at the Lawrence School, Sanawar, Himachal Pradesh from 1953 to 1961 (when he received his Senior School Certificate), and received a Government of India scholarship for his first two years at the Lawrence School. Chawla received a B.A. (Hons.) in history from St. Stephen's College, Delhi in 1966. He later studied at SOAS University of London and was awarded a second bachelor's degree, Bachelor of Arts in history, from the University of London (1965-1967). He received a diploma in social administration from the London School of Economics in 1968. Chawla was appointed a Fellow of Queen Elizabeth House at Oxford University in 1996.

== Career ==
Chawla was an Indian Administrative Service officer from the batch of 1969. He rose to the highest rank of Secretary to the Government of India. He served as a magistrate and later commissioner in the Union Territory of Delhi. He was appointed the first Chairman of the Delhi Vidyut (Electricity) Board. He was appointed Election Commissioner in 2005, succeeding B. B. Tandon (who was promoted to Chief Election Commissioner of India) and helped pioneer the open-skies policy as Joint Secretary in the Ministry of Information and Broadcasting (1992–96). Chawla was appointed India's 16th Chief Election Commissioner on 21 April 2009. He conducted the General Election of 2009. He wrote Mother Teresa's best-selling official biography, Mother Teresa.

=== Earlier posts ===
Chawla occupied a number of posts both in the Central Government as well as the Union Territories of Delhi, Lakshadweep and Pondicherry, becoming Additional Secretary and Secretary to the Government of India. These appointments were made during the time of the NDA Government headed by Prime Minister Vajpayee of the BJP.

== Chief Election Commissioner ==
Chawla undertook reforms of the electoral process and the election commission. He advocated a constitutional process for the removal of election commissioners, bringing it in line with that for removal of the chief election commissioner, so that election commissioners were afforded the same constitutional protection given to the CEC Chawla ensured that third gender individuals were given the right to vote for the first time. They had been left out of the democratic process, since they could not register as male or female. They could now register in a new category "Other". The issue was first broached by students at KIIT Law School, Bhubaneswar and Asia College of Journalism, Chennai. This human rights initiative was emulated by many other organisations in India and elsewhere. He also supported including the participation in the electoral process of under-trials in India. He believed that under-trials should be allowed to vote, especially as convicts could participate in the electoral process and even stand for election. He enlisted leprosy sufferers in electoral polls and encouraged braille-literate voters to vote independently.

== Association with Mother Teresa ==
Deeply influenced by Mother Teresa, he wrote her bestselling biography (translated into 14 languages). Almost half a million copies have been sold. Substantial royalties have been donated to the cause of leprosy. Because of her influence, he set up two NGOs which provide free medicines to leprosy patients, and free vocational training to healthy children of leprosy parents, which also includes beauty training given free by noted beautician Shahnaz Husain, as well as computer training programmes. Free education is provided to disabled children drawn from Below-Poverty-Line families. Currently, 130 such children and youth attend the Lepra India Trust School in Delhi. Meanwhile, at the 'Darshan School', of which Chawla was Chairman, there are 52 Hearing-Impaired children divided into seven classes of almost nine children per class as per the international norm. 20-30 boys and girls who are profoundly hearing-impaired are taught computer software and helped with employment. All services are free, including hearing aids (two per child) provided by Starkey Corporation.

== Societal contributions ==
Chawla was Founder Chairman of the Jaipur-based Lala Chaman Lal Education Trust, called 'Darshan', which looks after disabled hearing-impaired children, and which had obtained MPLADS funds from Congress MPs Aimaduddin Khan and R. P. Goenka. This amounted to 20% of the total expenditure. The trust was allotted 6 acres (24,000 m^{2}) of land by the Congress government in Rajasthan when Ashok Gehlot was Chief Minister.
All facilities are provided free of charge. At present 64 hearing-impaired children are taught by special educators. Computer software is taught to older students.

Navin Chawla was running another trust called the Lepra India Trust in Delhi which is focused on the treatment of leprosy-affected cases. Almost 20,000 street cases have been attended by Lepra doctors. The trust also teaches hearing-impaired children and children belonging to poor families. All conditions under the MPLAD act are scrupulously adhered to. Chawla provided for free services for all the children. He obtained employment for many youth.

Navin Chawla was invited on 16 February 2015 to distribute 'Smart Canes' to visually impaired students of Delhi University, during the course of the Antardhwani festival. An important part of the festival that mattered greatly to the cause of disability was distribution of "smart canes" to the first batch of visually impaired students. By June, it was hoped to distribute these canes to all those suffering from visual disability, including students and teachers alike, numbering about 200.

=== Leprosy ===
Chawla endorsed Justice A.P. Shah, chairman of the Law Commission's April 2015 recommendation that the then 117-year-old Lepers Act is highly discriminatory and must be removed from the statute book, and replaced by a more humane law that takes into account that leprosy is now fully curable. Chawla noted that "[t]hese recommendations, although belated, will only help if they lead to an enactment. Enactment must be followed by implementation, with understanding and compassion. More importantly, our society must understand that this disease is easily curable if it is treated early."

== Controversies ==
=== Shah Commission ===
In the 1970s the Shah Commission an independent commission headed by former Chief Justice of India Jayantilal Chhotalal Shah which investigated atrocities during the Emergency, said in its final report that Chawla was "unfit to hold any public office which demands an attitude of fair play and consideration for others." The Delhi High Court (Justice T. P. S. Chawla) however dismissed the report of the Shah Commission.

=== Alleged links with the Indian National Congress ===
In March 2006 the National Democratic Alliance presented the President of India, A. P. J. Abdul Kalam, with a memorandum for his removal signed by over 200 MPs. The memorandum questioned his impartiality in light of alleged links with the Indian National Congress. This was rejected by the Government.

Apprehensive about Chawla's alleged links to the Nehru-Gandhi family, in May 2006 Jaswant Singh, opposition leader in the Rajya Sabha, appealed to the Supreme Court of India for Chawla's removal as election commissioner because of his lifelong association with Congress politicians and the MPLADS controversy. The Chief Election Commissioner, N Gopalaswami suo moto, without consulting the full Commission or Election Commissioner Quraishi, filed an affidavit with the Supreme Court that he had the power to remove an election commissioner (EC). Following upon this, the Bharatiya Janata Party (BJP) then withdrew its petition. The Supreme Court ruled, "We are allowing withdrawal of the petitions while keeping open all questions [raised in the petitions]. They can make representation to the CEC, who will decide such representation in accordance with law. We are not expressing any opinion on merits".

On 31 January 2009, Chief Election Commissioner N. Gopalaswami, unusually, and without consulting the full Commission or Commissioner Quraishi, received a small NDA delegation in his private chambers. Based on that, he sent his recommendation of Chawla's removal as election commissioner to the President of India. Based on that the CEC alleged that Chawla had discharged his duties as election commissioner in a partisan manner, seeking to further the interests of "one party". The CEC alleged that Chawla had shared some information about the election commission to Congress Party officials. He is also reported to have opposed the election commission's notice to Sonia Gandhi for accepting honours from Belgium. Chawla and Quraishi in a two-to-one majority judgement had dismissed the complaint against Sonia Gandhi.

The CEC, N. Gopalaswami's recommendation against Chawla, was in itself seen as controversial by several eminent jurists including Fali Nariman, and it was rejected by the President of India. Chawla became CEC of India on 20 April 2009, and concluded the 2009 Indian Parliamentary Election.

In order to stall Chawla becoming the CEC, two BJP lawyers and office bearers tried to petition a local Jaipur court for an FIR against Chawla and senior officials of the government of Rajasthan about the allotment of land to Chawla's trusts in Jaipur by the Jaipur Development Authority in 2000. The court declined to order the filing of an FIR; in an order dated 10 February 2009, the court said it was satisfied by a police investigation that there was nothing wrong. The court dismissed the complaint.

== Death ==
Chawla died at a hospital in New Delhi, on 1 February 2025, at the age of 79.

== Awards ==
- 2005 Mazzini Award from the government of Italy "in recognition of his efforts to forge a new relationship with Italy and strengthening existing bonds"
- 2004 award from the New Delhi Institution of Directors
- NDTV-Icon of the year 2009
- NDTV-Icon of the year 2013
- In 2014 -Bhartiya Vidhya Bhavan, Mumbai Award for conducting of election

== Bibliography ==
- 1988: "The Vocational Rehabilitation and Social Re-integration of the Leprosy Affected in India" (report released at the India International Centre in New Delhi by Mother Teresa on 18 October 1988)
- 1992: authorised biography, Mother Teresa; translated into 14 languages in India and abroad
- 1996: Faith and Compassion – The Life and Work of Mother Teresa (with photographer Raghu Rai); Element Books (UK and US), translated into Dutch and Spanish
