= Rajiv Kumar (civil servant) =

25th Chief Election Commissioner of India

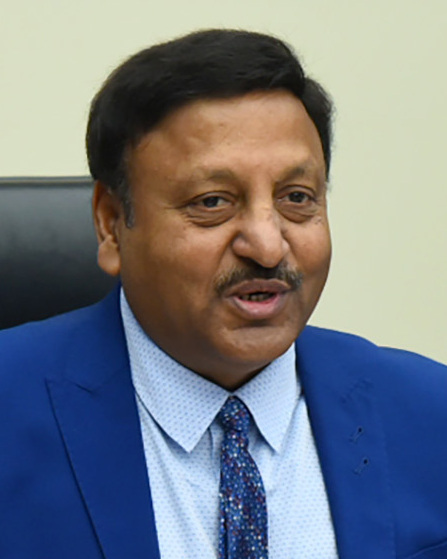
- Rajiv Kumar in 2024

25th Chief Election Commissioner of India
- In office 15 May 2022 – 18 February 2025
- Election Commissioner: Gyanesh Kumar; Sukhbir Singh Sandhu
- Preceded by: Sushil Chandra
- Succeeded by: Gyanesh Kumar

Election Commissioner of India
- In office 1 September 2020 – 14 May 2022
- Preceded by: Ashok Lavasa
- Succeeded by: Arun Goel

Chairman of Public Enterprise Selection Board
- In office 1 March 2020 – 31 August 2020
- Preceded by: Kapil Dev Tripathi
- Succeeded by: Mallika Srinivasan

Finance Secretary of India
- In office 1 August 2019 – 29 February 2020
- Preceded by: Subhash Chandra Garg
- Succeeded by: Ajay Bhushan Pandey

Personal details
- Born: Rajiv Kumar Agarwal; 19 February 1960 (age 66) Hasanpur, Uttar Pradesh, India
- Education: St. Stephen’s College, Delhi; University of Delhi
- Occupation: Retired IAS Officer

Rajiv Kumar (born 19 February 1960 in Hasanpur District Amroha Uttar Pradesh) is a retired Indian Administrative Service officer. On 15 May 2022, he assumed the charge as the 25th Chief Election Commissioner of India, and served until 18 February 2025. He has joined HDFC as a part time chairman.

== Early life ==
Rajiv Kumar was born on 19 February 1960 in Hasanpur, District Amroha Uttar Pradesh, he holds degrees in BSc from St. Stephen’s College, Delhi then he further on completed his LLB, PGDM, and a master's degree in public policy. Rajiv completed his LLB from Delhi University between 1979 and 1982 and he is also an alumnus of the TERI School of Advanced Studies.

== Career ==
Rajiv Kumar is an Indian Administrative Service officer of the Bihar/Jharkhand cadre of the 1984 batch. As the director and joint secretary in the Tribal Affairs Ministry between 2001 and 2007, Kumar drafted the Scheduled Tribes (Reorganisation of Forests Rights) Bill, 2005.

Rajiv Kumar has also held other positions such as director for the Central Board of Reserve Bank of India (RBI), SBI, and NABARD. He has also been a member of the Economic Intelligence Council (EIC), Financial Stability and Development Council (FSDC), Bank Board Bureau (BBB) and Financial Sector Regulatory Appointments Search Committee (FSRASC). He held the post of finance secretary between September 2017 and February 2020. During his tenure, he undertook several banking, insurance, and pension reforms. Kumar has been instrumental in streamlining the National Pension System (NPS) which extends its benefits to about 18 lakh central government employees. He superannuated from service in February 2020 and later he held the post of chairman of the Public Enterprises Selection Board since April 2020 before being appointed as the Election Commissioner of India on 1 September 2020.

As Finance Secretary-cum-Secretary, Department of Financial Services to GOI, (Sept 2017 - Feb 2020), Kumar supervised the financial services sector and was instrumental in introducing inter-alia major initiatives/reforms in Banking, Insurance & Pension sector.

== 25th Chief Election Commissioner ==
Rajiv Kumar was appointed as the Chief Election Commissioner of India (CEC) on 15 May 2022. He served their till 18 February 2025. After assuming charge, Kumar trekked for 18 km through inaccessible terrain to visit an interior polling station in Dumak village in Chamoli, Uttarakhand. He assessed the polling requirements and motivated polling officials, who travel through tough terrains during elections.

Kumar successfully conducted 16th Presidential and Vice Presidential Elections in 2022. Droupadi Murmu and Jagdeep Dhankhar were respectively elected as the President and the Vice-President of India.

=== State Assembly Elections ===
Kumar, in his tenure, led the assembly elections in Gujarat and Himachal Pradesh in November–December 2022, three Northeastern States - Tripura, Nagaland and Meghalaya

== International Cooperation ==
Further, under Kumar’s guidance, the Election Commission of India led the ‘Cohort on Election Integrity’ under the ‘Summit for Democracy’. ‘Summit for Democracy’, is an initiative of the US President hosted in December 2021. As part of the ‘ ‘Cohort on Election Integrity’, Election Commission of India had organized three International Conferences with Mauritius, Greece & International organization IFES as co-leads. The first Conference on ‘Role, Framework & Capacity of EMBs’ was organized on 31 October – 1 November 2022 in New Delhi. EMBs from Armenia, Mauritius, Nepal, Cabo Verde, Australia, Chile, Federal States of Micronesia, Greece, Philippines, São Tomé & Príncipe and three international organizations namely, IFES, International IDEA and UNDP India participated in the conference. Excellencies, Ambassadors/High Commissioners and other members of the Diplomatic Corps from Costa Rica, Ghana, Jamaica, Albania, Nepal, Greece, Montenegro, Spain also attended the two day Conference. Ms. Elizabeth Jones, the then Charge d’Affaires, ad interim at US Embassy in New Delhi also attended the Conference.

== Controversies ==
Rajiv Kumar was mired in controversies all through his tenure, with allegations of bias against the opposition parties and working in favour of Bhartiya Janata Party being leveled against him again and again, which he denied vehemently.
