= Vivekananda Educational Society =

Indian Nonprofit service organisation

- VES
- Established: 1972
- Affiliations: Vidya Bharati
- President: Shri N. Gopalaswami
- Vice-president: Shri S.Gurumurthy Shri Dulichand Jain
- Location: Chennai, Tamil Nadu, India
- Website: http://www.vesonline.org/

Vivekananda Educational Society (VES) is a registered non profit, service organization which owns and operates several schools located in the vicinity of Chennai. It has 20 schools in and around Chennai and one residential school, which are affiliated to Vidya Bharati Akhil Bharatiya Shiksha Sansthan. It was registered as a society in 1972 by a group of persons associated with the Vivekananda Rock Memorial. The society has 20,000 students attending its schools everyday across the city. This society is currently headed by Shri N. Gopalaswami who was a former Chief Election Commissioner of India known to be a person sticking to principles.

== Beginnings ==
Both the Society and the Trust have their roots form the Vivekananda Rock Memorial and Vivekananda Kendra of Kanyakumari. The society was started by like-minded persons inspired by teachings of Swami Vivekananda. The first school to be established was Sri Ram Dayal Kemka Vivekananda Vidyalaya, set up in the locality of Ellai Amman Koil Street, Thiruvottiyur in 1972. Agricultural land which was present in abundance, at that time was converted for educational purposes.but this failed to happen on the46 th year.

== Education System ==
Most of the schools in the society follow the Central Board of Secondary Education curriculum. 2 schools follow the Tamil Nadu Board after high school. This could be due to more students preferring the state board for the increasing their chances of getting into regional colleges. Students are generally willing to switch schools for this purpose.

The Vivekananda Educational Trust was set up in 1991 to establish State board schools in comparatively underdeveloped regions. They follow the matriculation curriculum for ease of teaching and because it would be easier to follow for students hailing from middle- and lower-middle-class families. The trust has 5 schools in Thiruninravur, Minjur, Periasekkadu (Manali), Mudichur and Vallur.

== Cultural Activities ==
Bhajans are held in schools every Friday evening. Competitions like breaking the pot, poetry competitions, dance dramas are held on Krishna Jayanthi. Students are trained to dance for the recorded songs in Indian classical and folk forms, while others are trained to play roles in the skits representing Hindu mythology. Other events besides the Culturals include the Sports Day celebration in January and the Annual day Celebration in February or March. Other functions celebrated are Guru Poornima, Independence Day, Republic Day, Mahakavi Bharatiyar day, Swami Vivekananda Jayanti and Teacher's Day.but these made many culturalists due to non academic activities.

== Sports ==
Sports played in the schools belonging to the society include cricket, football, badminton, chess, carrom kho kho, kabadi, volleyball, throwball etc. Inter school sports meets across the major schools in the society are held every year. Many regional sports meet especially kho kho and kabadi are held in these schools. The society's schools has produced teams who have participated in the national level in kho kho.

== Three Day Camp ==
It is general practice to send pupils from various schools of the society, especially those at a middle school level for a three-day training camp in any one of the various schools present. This camp is voluntary but is generally attended by a majority of students. These camps follow the training methodology similar to RSS's Varg camps but is of a much shorter duration. Stories of saints, national heroes are told to students along with an overview of Upanishads and Vedas. It generally has two major sessions of one in the morning and one in the afternoon. Learning opportunities include getting to know about Yoga and Surya Namaskara along with sports like cricket, football, badminton etc. Vedic Maths, better known as Speed Math is also taught along with traditional arts like garland weaving etc.

== List of schools ==
Its major schools include

- Sri Ram Dayal Khemka Vivekananda Vidyalaya Junior College
- Smt. Ramkuwar Devi Fomra Vivekananda Vidyalaya
- Smt. Kasturba Nimchand Shah P. Muthyalu Chetty Vivekananda Vidyalaya Junior College
- Smt. Narbada Devi J Agarwal Vivekananda Vidyalaya Junior College
- Dr.Nalli Kuppuswami Vivekananda Vidyalaya Junior College
- G.K. Shetty Vivekananda Vidyalaya Junior College
- G.R.Thangamaligai Mahalakshmi Vivekananda Vidyalaya
- Sreevatsa Viswanathan Vivekananda Vidyalaya Junior College
- Vivekananda Vidya Kala Ashram Rotary Central Vivekananda Vidyalaya
- Round Table 30 Vivekananda Vidyalaya
- ongc public school, Neravy, Karaikal
