= Om Prakash Rawat =

22nd Chief Election Commissioner of India

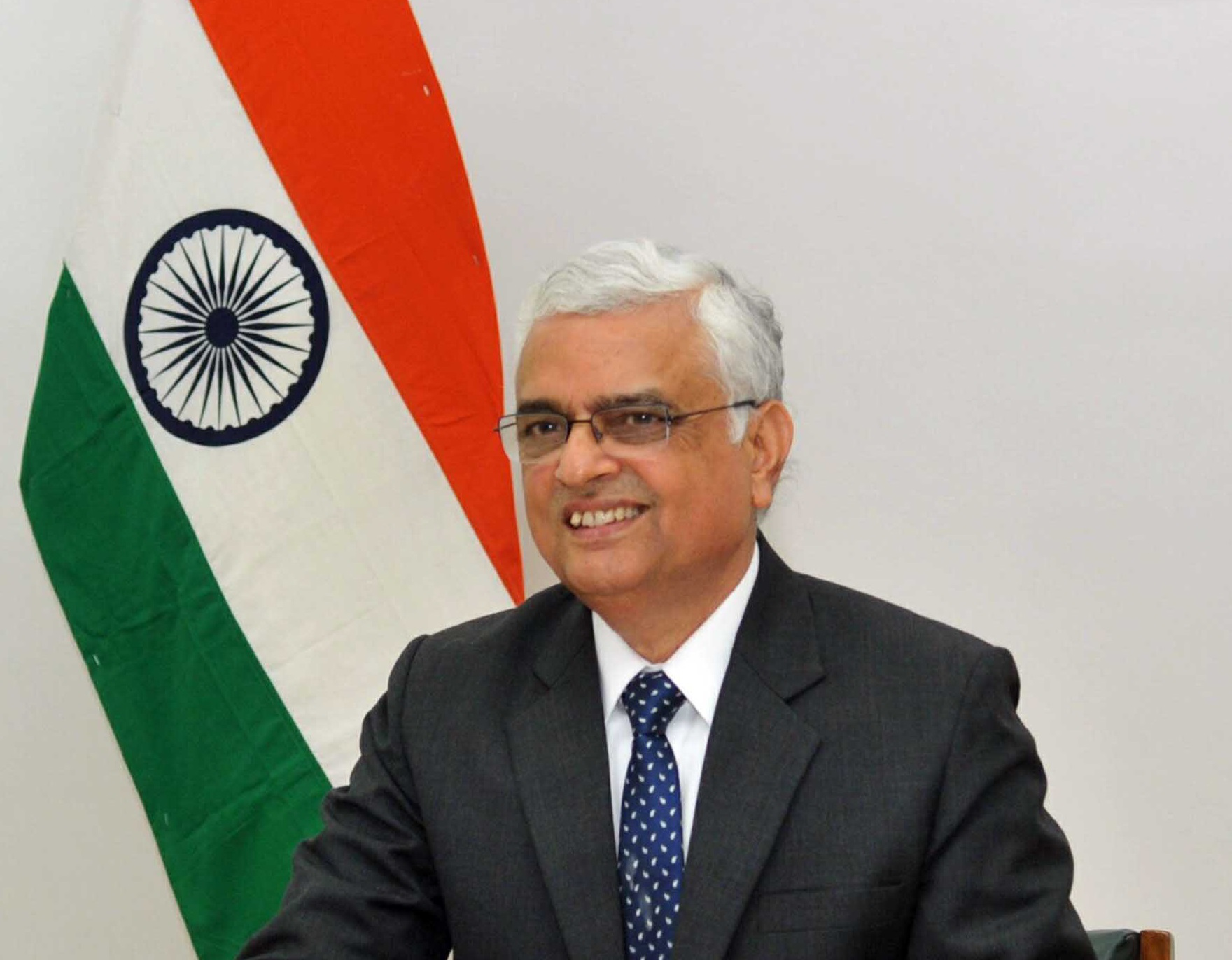
- Rawat taking charge as the Chief Election Commissioner of India, in January 2018

22nd Chief Election Commissioner of India
- In office 23 January 2018 – 1 December 2018
- President: Ram Nath Kovind
- Preceded by: Achal Kumar Jyoti
- Succeeded by: Sunil Arora

Election Commissioner of India
- In office 14 August 2015 – 22 January 2018

Public Enterprise Secretary of India
- In office 3 March 2012 – 31 December 2013

Personal details
- Born: Om Prakash Rawat; 2 December 1953 (age 72) Uttar Pradesh, India
- Education: Banaras Hindu University (BSc, MSc)
- Occupation: Retired IAS Officer
- Awards: An awardee of state government's 'recognition of forest rights' in 2009.

Om Prakash Rawat (born 2 December 1953) is a retired 1977 batch Indian Administrative Service (IAS) officer of the Madhya Pradesh cadre who served as 22nd Chief Election Commissioner of India. He has also served as one of the two Election Commissioners of India and the Public Enterprise Secretary of India.

== Education ==
Rawat is a graduate (BSc) and postgraduate (MSc) in physics from the Banaras Hindu University, Varanasi (BHU), and has postgraduate degree (MSc) in social development planning, which he did in 1989 in the United Kingdom.

== Career ==
=== As an IAS officer ===
Rawat served in various positions for both the Government of India and the Government of Madhya Pradesh such as Principal Secretary (Commerce and Industries), Principal Secretary to the Chief Minister of Madhya Pradesh, Principal Secretary (Woman and Child Development) Principal Secretary (Tribal Welfare), Vice Chairman of Narmada Valley Development Authority, Excise Commissioner of Madhya Pradesh, and as the district magistrate and collector of Narsinghpur and Indore districts in the Madhya Pradesh government; and as the Union Public Enterprise Secretary, and as a joint secretary in the Ministry of Defence in the Indian government. As the Principal Secretary, Tribal Development in Govt of Madhya Pradesh he received the Prime Ministers Award for outstanding and innovative work in the implementation of the Forest Rights Act, 2006.

==== Public Enterprise Secretary ====
Rawat was appointed as the Union Public Enterprise Secretary by the Appointments Committee of the Cabinet in March 2012, he assumed office on 3 March 2012, and demitted it on and superannuation from service on 31 December 2013. It was under his tenure, in April 2013, that the Guidelines on Corporate Social Responsibility (CSR) and Sustainability for Central Public Sector Enterprises were developed and became a forebear of the amendment of Indian Companies Act (February 2014) that introduced a new CSR Policy in the country, making it mandatory for larger enterprises to spend at least 2 percent of their profits on socially responsible activities.

=== Post-retirement ===
==== Election Commissioner of India ====
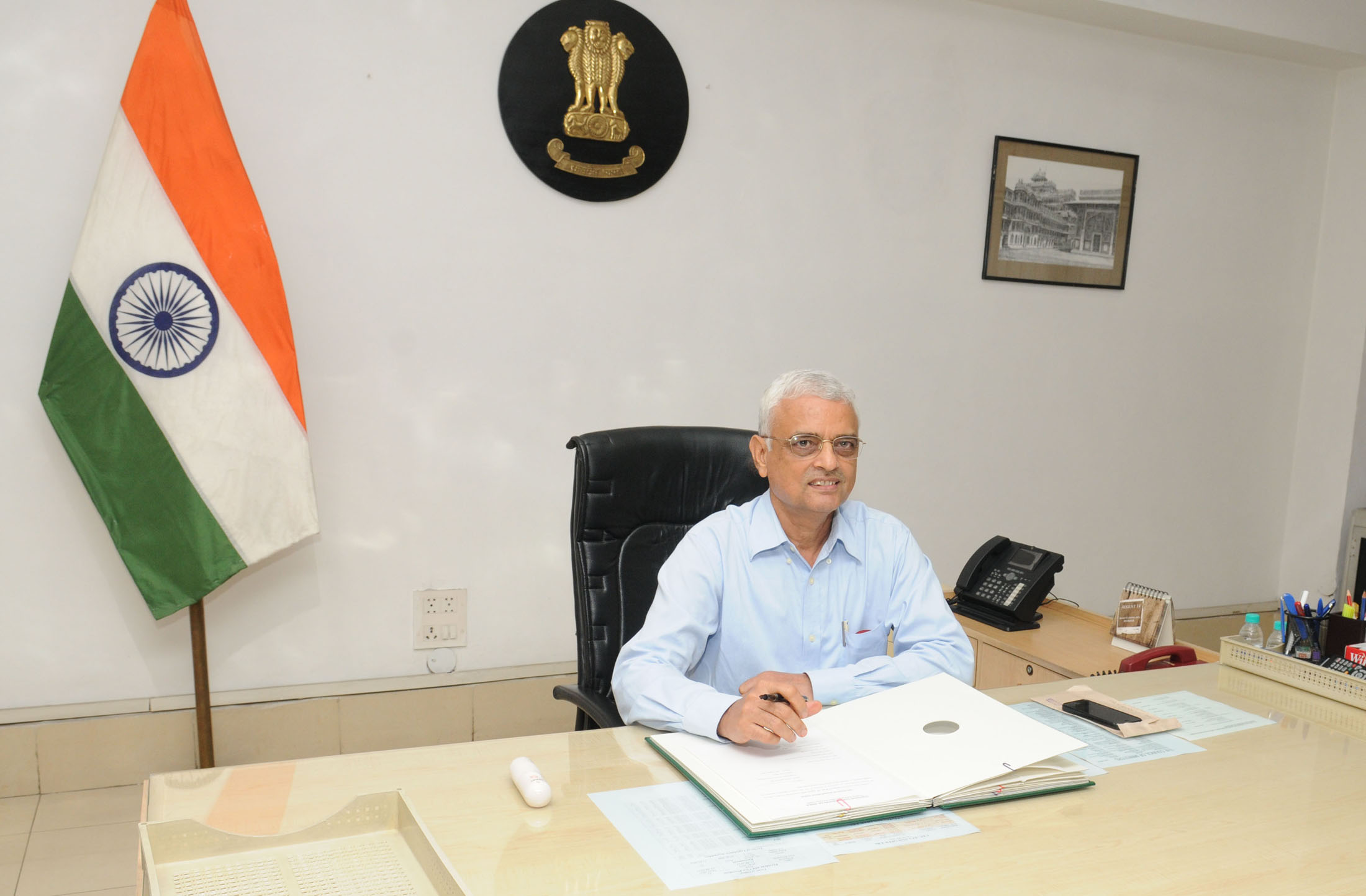
Rawat taking charge as an Election Commissioner of India in August 2015

Rawat assumed office as one of the two Election Commissioners of India on 14 August 2015. During his tenure at the Election Commission of India, elections to state legislative assemblies of Bihar, Tamil Nadu, Kerala, West Bengal, Assam, Puducherry, Uttar Pradesh, Goa, Punjab, Uttarakhand, Manipur, Gujarat, Himachal Pradesh, presidential and vice presidential elections were held during his tenure as election commissioner of India.

==== Chief Election Commissioner of India ====
As the senior-most Election Commissioner, post the retirement of Achal Kumar Jyoti, Rawat was announced to be the next Chief Election Commissioner on 21 January 2018. Rawat assumed charge as the Chief Election Commissioner of India on 23 January 2018. Elections to state assemblies of Meghalaya, Nagaland, Tripura, Karnataka, Madhya Pradesh, Rajasthan, Telangana, Chhattisgarh and Mizoram were held under his tenure as chief election commissioner. He retired from the post on 1 December 2018 on attaining 65 years of age.
