= V. S. Sampath =

18th Chief Election Commissioner of India

Veeravalli Sundaram Sampath
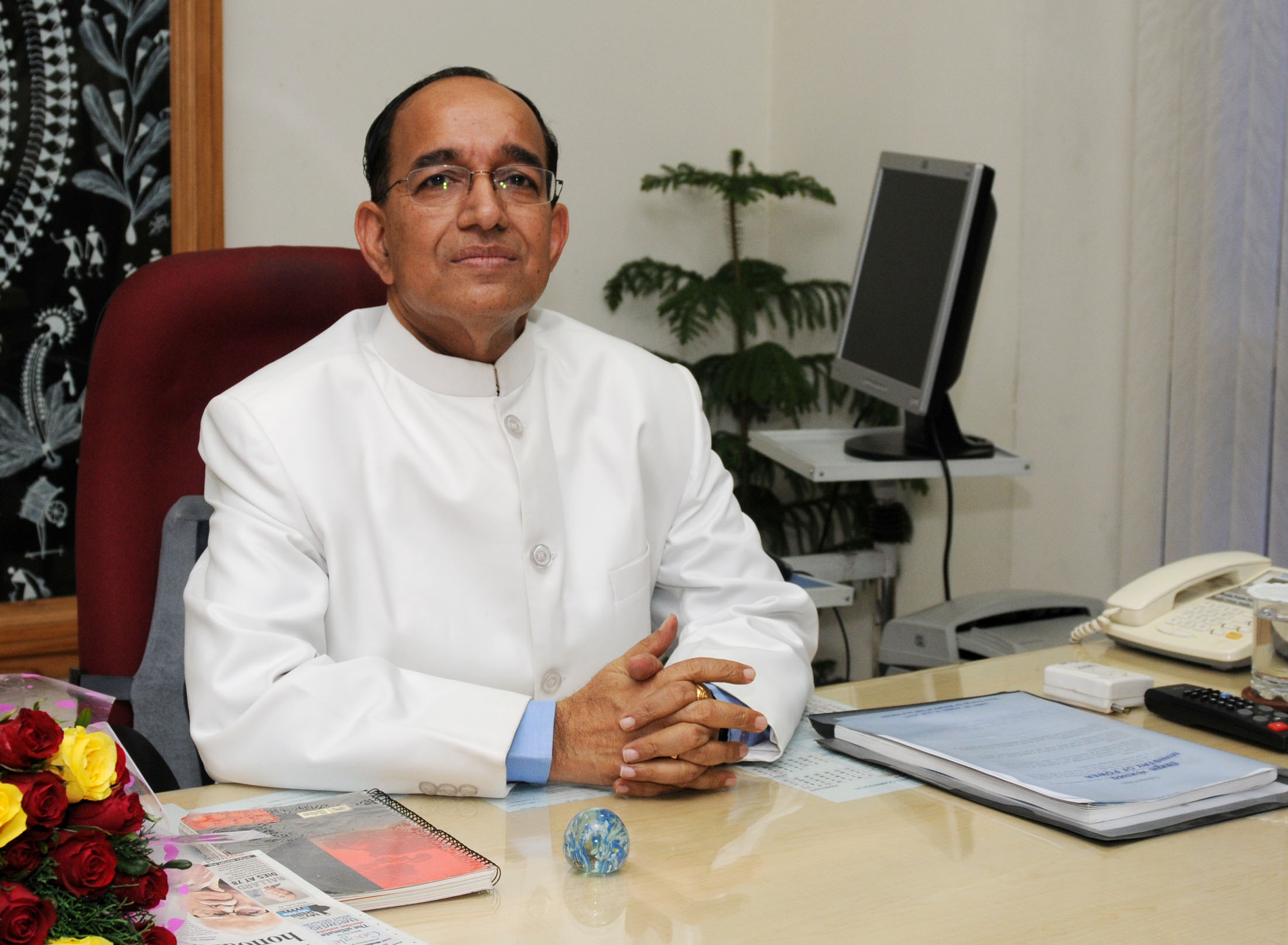

18th Chief Election Commissioner of India
- In office 11 June 2012 – 15 January 2015
- President: Pratibha Patil; Pranab Mukherjee
- Prime Minister: Manmohan Singh; Narendra Modi
- Preceded by: S. Y. Quraishi
- Succeeded by: Harishankar Brahma

Personal details
- Born: Walajapet, Ranipet, Tamil Nadu 16 January 1950 (age 76)
- Profession: Civil servant

Veeravalli Sundaram Sampath (Tamil: வீரவல்லி சுந்தரம் சம்பத்) served as 18th Chief Election Commissioner (CEC) of the Election Commission of India from 2012 to 2015 . He succeeded S. Y. Quraishi as the Chief Election Commissioner on 11 June 2012. Born on 16 January 1950, Sampath retired on 15 January 2015 when he attained 65 years of age.

== Early career ==
In his early career in the state of Andhra Pradesh in the southern part of India, Shri Sampath was the administrative head (District Collector) of large Indian districts between 1975 and 1986. This stint, apart from giving him a strong grounding in public administration and policy implementation, also provided a good exposure to election organization at the grass root level. As the District Collector of several coastal districts, Shri Sampath led large teams in managing natural disasters and cyclone relief in rural areas, an experience that required execution abilities under extreme pressure and timelines.

Subsequently, Shri V S Sampath also led several state owned financial institutions and federations such as the Apex Co-operative Bank, Handloom Marketing Society, and Oil Seeds Federation in Food and Public Distribution Department, Industries Department and Finance Department between 1986 and 1989. This provided a strong footing in managing organizations and working towards realization of organizational goals in compressed timeframes. He served as CEC until he reached the retirement age of 65 on 15 January 2015.

== Middle career ==
Subsequently, between 1990 and 2004, Shri Sampath moved to the upper echelons of the state administration, wherein he held several challenging portfolios like Secretary in Agriculture Department and Principal Secretary in Energy Department.

His period as Principal Secretary Energy ushered in the first instance of large-scale power sector reforms in a large state like Andhra Pradesh, and enabling the opening up of the sector for the private sector investment in power sector. The work of the Energy department and the state administration in reforming the power sector has been internationally appreciated, and has demonstrated how effective governance and reforms could reduce AT&C losses and improve distribution efficiencies.

Subsequently, Shri Sampath then served as Principal Secretary, Finance wherein he handled the state finances of Andhra Pradesh, a state with an annual budget of over Rs. 51,000 crores (or $8 billion) and a population of over 80 million.

== Recent Years ==
In the past few years Shri Sampath held several important postings in Central Government. Starting with a stint in the Union Ministry of Rural Development. In 2005, Shri Sampath was appointed as Director General, National Institute of Rural Development. Subsequently, he held the post of Secretary, Chemicals and Petrochemicals where he was pivotal in conceptualizing and implementing the PCPIR policy to help the growth of the Petrochemical sector in India by facilitating massive investments in the identified Regions.

Later, he also served as Secretary, in the Central Power Ministry, where he was instrumental in implementing several forward-thinking policies to aid the sector. Among them was Restructured-Accelerated Power Development and Reforms Programme (R-APDRP), a mega-package for the renovation and modernization of Indian power utilities to help them improve their performance.

== As CEC ==
To his credit, as Chief Election commissioner, Sampath has smoothly conducted the largest electoral exercise in the history of world democracies - 2014 Indian general election-the 14th general elections in India, where 550 million voters out 814 million eligible voters participated and the highest voting percentage was recorded since Indian independence-66.7%. This election was applauded as the largest electoral exercise in the world, and drew international praise. Discovery Channel also did a special show called The World's Biggest Election.

Sampath has brought with him to the office of CEC, a style of quiet efficiency, effective planning and time-bound execution. An outstanding example of his brand of election management is the recently conducted Jharkhand and Jammu & Kashmir elections. Both these elections were conducted in adverse circumstances - Jharkhand on the back of Maoist violence, and J&K on the back of floods and perennial terrorism issues. However, the election was executed to clockwork precision, and this achievement was noted by all as being one of the smoothest elections in these two states. As is typical of Sampath's style, the Election Commission has conducted these elections with least amount of media interaction and hype. Leaders of major political parties in J&K also complimented the free & fair election process.

== Electoral innovations as CEC ==
As Chief Election Commissioner, Sampath pioneered several reforms in poll management, the primary among them being :

- Expenditure monitoring.
- Flying squads and surveillance teams were set up to monitor election expenditure of candidates during the election. This exercise was maximised during the General Elections 2014, where over 21000 flying squads were deployed] to monitor candidate expenditure. These teams enabled seizures of cash of Rs 313 crore, 2.2 lakh litres of liquor valued at Rs 1,000 crore and 1.85 lakh kg of drugs. The Commission also deployed a "standard operating procedure for flying squads and static surveillance teams" that was quite effective in checking usage of cash in elections.
- Sampath played a role in introduction of Voter-verified paper audit trail (VVPAT) in eight Lok Sabha constituencies in Indian General Elections. Voter-verified paper audit trail (VVPAT) system was first used with EVMs in a by-poll in September 2013 in Noksen (Assembly Constituency) in Nagaland. VVPAT was used in gradual manner in all elections starting from September 2013- 2013 Mizoram Legislative Assembly election, 2013 Delhi Legislative Assembly election, 2013 Madhya Pradesh Legislative Assembly election, 2013 Rajasthan Legislative Assembly election, 2013 Chhattisgarh Legislative Assembly election, 2014 Indian general election, 2014 Maharashtra Legislative Assembly election, 2014 Haryana Legislative Assembly election, 2014 Jammu and Kashmir Legislative Assembly election, 2014 Jharkhand Legislative Assembly election
- NOTA was also an option on Indian voting machines during his tenure.
- Sampath also introduced the Systematic Voter Awareness and Electoral Participation (SVEEP) Program to increase participation of voters in elections. This move has borne exceptional results with every election in his tenure recording higher turnouts than before, and the 2014 General Election recording the highest turnout since Indian Independence.
- Under Sampath's tenure, the Election Commission has also taken many steps to make voting convenient and comfortable for voters. The Election Commission devised Model Voting Stations, a polling station with all basic amenities and essential requirements to make voting an enjoyable experience.
- V. S. Sampath also emphasized voting rights for NRIs through proxy voting.Later Supreme Court of India awarded voting rights to NRIs on 12 January 2015.

== Invocation of Article 324 of the Constitution of India ==
The Article 324 of the Indian Constitution is the basic article for the Election Commission that provides for powers to ensure free and fair elections in India. However, in comparison to earlier Election Commissions, Sampath was the first to invoke the powers under Article 324 to take strong disciplinary actions in the sphere of free and fair elections.

As an unprecedented move, Sampath banned several campaigners from the General Elections 2014 for hate speeches during the campaign time. This put a check to polarizing speeches by political parties in the run up to the General Elections, and all subsequent elections.

Further, in comparison to earlier Election Commissioners who were content with making recommendations to amend the law with regarding to Election Expenditure, Sampath was the first CEC who invoked the power of Article 324 to issue transparency guidelines. This move sparked several protests by political parties, who cited lack of jurisdiction on part of the Election Commission to issue such orders. However, in another unprecedented step, the Election Commission issued a clarification that such guidelines are binding, and any non-compliance would result in invocation of the draconian Para 16A of the Symbols Order 1968. Para 16A allows for the Election Commission to de-recognize a political party, a step that would deny the party of free airtime on state owned channels / radio, lack of access to free electoral rolls and non-availability of subsidized land for party offices. This greatly gives teeth to the Election Commission in managing election expenditure.

== Personal life ==
VS Sampath is considered low-profile and efficient in execution of the job at hand. He is variously described as god-fearing, media-shy and self-effacing. Famously, as CEC during the General Elections 2014 (when the nation's administration was under his control), he went to the famous Tirupati temple and had a laghu darshan from a distance like any ordinary citizen, setting an example for functionaries in high office.

Sampath lives in Delhi with his wife, and has two children, a son and a daughter.

== Disqualification in the Ashok Chavan case ==
In the landmark judgement in the Ashok Chavan case in the case of inaccurate electoral rolls in the 2009 election, the Election Commission held -

"Para 94 - Having regard to the totality of the circumstances mentioned above relating to the publication of the aforesaid 25 advertisements in various newspapers referred to above, the Commission is of the considered view that respondent cannot validly claim ignorance about the publication of the abovementioned 25 advertisements in which his name, the name of his constituency and also his photograph prominently appeared."

Thus Ashok Chavan was issued a show-cause notice for disqualification in the above case. This sets a bench-mark for accurate election reporting, and the Election Commission, under Sampath, for the first time, took the pathbreaking decision of moving towards disqualification of a politician for inaccurate reporting of poll expenses. The matter is now in appeal in the Delhi high Court.

== Expenditure reform ==
Sampath is noted to be the first CEC to have taken far-reaching steps in expenditure management. Among these steps include static surveillance squads to monitor election expenditure of candidates, organizing expenditure observers during elections and maintaining shadow accounts for candidates. Importantly, Sampath issued the "Transparency guidelines" for political parties, thereby making it mandatory for them to file semi-annual returns of their balance sheets & and income statements.

== Views on electoral reforms ==
V. S. Sampath believes that the Election Commission should be given greater autonomy and more power for its effective functioning. He advocates for a strong law to curb the practice of paid news. He has suggested the Parliament to take up right to reject. Advocating such a move, he said, "Right to reject is an idea inherent to democracy, whose time for execution has come".
