= T. Swaminathan =

Former Chief Election Commissioner of India

Thirumalraya Swaminathan

Indian Ambassador to Belgium
- In office 16 December 1966 – 20 January 1970
- Preceded by: K. B. Lall
- Succeeded by: Bhagvatprasad Raojibhai Patel

cabinet secretary of India
- In office 1 December 1970 – 2 November 1972
- Preceded by: B.Sivaraman
- Succeeded by: B.D.Pande

Chief Election Commissioner of India
- In office 1973–1977
- Preceded by: Nagendra Singh
- Succeeded by: S. L. Shakdhar

Thirumalraya Swaminathan was cabinet secretary of India during 1 December 1970 to 2 November 1972. He was a member of Indian Civil Service (ICS). Swaminathan, served as 5th Chief Election Commissioner of India, from 7 February 1973 to 17 June 1977.

| Preceded by Dr. Nagendra Singh | Chief Election Commissioner of India; 1973—1977 | Succeeded by S. L. Shakdhar |
