= T. S. Krishnamurthy =

13th Chief Election Commissioner of India (born 1941)

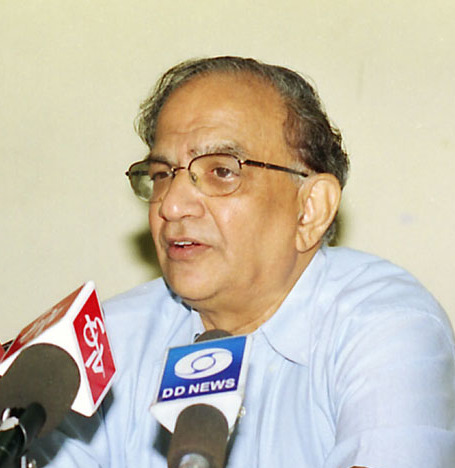

13th Chief Election Commissioner of India
- In office February 2004 – May 2005
- President: A. P. J. Abdul Kalam
- Prime Minister: Atal Bihari Vajpayee; Manmohan Singh
- Preceded by: J.M.Lyngdoh
- Succeeded by: B.B.Tandon

Personal details
- Born: 1941 (age 84–85)
- Occupation: civil servant

Taruvai Subayya Krishnamurthy (born 1941) is a former Indian Revenue Service officer who served as 13th Chief Election Commissioner (C.E.C) of India (February 2004 – May 2005). His main assignment as C.E.C was to oversee the 2004 elections to the Lok Sabha. He had earlier served in the Election Commission of India as a commissioner since January 2000.

== Background ==
Krishnamurthy started his career as an Indian Revenue Service officer. He served the government at various levels including as Secretary, Department of Company Affairs. He was the first Indian Revenue Service officer to become a Secretary to the Government of India as well as the Chief Election Commissioner of India.

As Chief Election Commissioner of India, he was instrumental in rolling out Electronic Voting Machines (EVMs) in all the polling booths across the country.

As Secretary, Department of Company Affairs, he is credited with setting up of Investor Education and Protection Fund to collect and use unclaimed dividends of companies.

Prior to that, he held the positions of Additional Secretary (Expenditure) in the Ministry of Finance, Chief Commissioner of Income Tax, Bombay.

As Joint Secretary (Foreign Tax Division) he is credited with signing Double Tax Avoidance treaties with Canada, Greece, UK, Singapore, Hong Kong, Malaysia, Germany etc.

Krishnamurthy started his career as a probationary officer at the Bank of India (prior to nationalization) at the age of 19. He joined the Indian Revenue Service in the batch of 1963, subsequent to which he was posted as Income Tax Officer in Madras. Having served number of ministries in New Delhi including Shipping and Finance, he was deputed as a Deputy General Manager with the Hindustan Shipyard Limited in Visakhapatnam.

He also served as an IMF advisor in Ethiopia and Georgia. As Chief Election Commissioner he was an observer to the elections in Zimbabwe and the U.S Presidential Elections in 2004. In 2005, Krishnamurthy was appointed by the Supreme Court of India to conduct the elections to the Board of Control for Cricket in India (B.C.C.I) in order to ensure free and fair polls amidst the different factions within the BCCI.

== Early life and personal history ==
Krishnamurthy hails from Taruvai village in Tirunelveli district. He was born and brought up in Tiruchirapalli and went on to study high school at Baroda/Bangalore. He went on to study at St Joseph's College, Bangalore. Krishnamurthy won gold medals in History, Economics and Political Science at Mysore University. He also completed a master's degree in Fiscal Studies from the University of Bath, U.K.

Post his retirement, he was a board member of various companies and NGOs. He was the Chairman of Bharatiya Vidya Bhavan, Chennai Kendra.

He is the author of two books -- Miracles of Democracy, published(Harper Collins) in 2008 and Beyond the Ballot: Paradoxes of Democracy, published (Falcon)in 2025.

Krishnamurthy is married to Geetha Krishnamurthy, a Veena artiste from Chennai.
