= James Michael Lyngdoh =

Indian civil servant

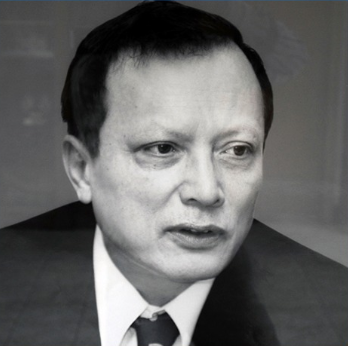

Chief Election Commissioner of India
- In office 14 June 2001 – 7 February 2004
- Preceded by: M. S. Gill
- Succeeded by: T. S. Krishnamurthy

Personal details
- Born: 8 February 1939 (age 87)
- Occupation: Civil servant
- Awards: Ramon Magsaysay Award 2003 Government Service

James Michael Lyngdoh (born 8 February 1939) is an Indian civil servant and was Chief Election Commissioner of India from 14 June 2001 to 7 February 2004. He was awarded the Ramon Magsaysay Award for Government Service in 2003.

== Work as Election Commissioner ==
In 1997, the president named Lyngdoh one of India's three election commissioners. By 2001 he was chief election commissioner. Lyngdoh soon faced crisis in two of India's most troubled states.

=== Gujarat Elections, and Confrontation with Narendra Modi ===
In July 2002, S S Bhandari, Governor of Gujarat on the recommendation of State Cabinet headed by Chief Minister Narendra Modi, dissolved the Gujarat Assembly nine months before its term was due to end. The decision, attacked by main Opposition Congress and Left parties, was seen as an attempt to force the Election Commission to hold early elections in view of the Constitutional mandate prohibiting a more than six-month gap between two sessions of the House. The dissolution of the assembly had been publicly opposed by the Election Commission in wake of the then recent communal violence in the state.

The Election Commission headed by Lyngdoh ruled out early elections in Gujarat. On 20 August 2002, in a public meeting at Bodeli, near Vadodara, Modi targeted Lyngdoh. Modi insinuated that the reason the Election Commission had delayed holding the Gujarat assembly elections was because Lyngdoh was a Christian.

Lyngdoh hit back at Modi for attacking him on religious grounds, saying it was "quite despicable" and "gossip of menials" by those who have not heard of atheism.

A day after Prime Minister Vajapayee's rebuke, Modi claimed that the controversy with Lyngdoh was over following Vajpayee's "guidelines" but reiterated his demand for early assembly elections in Gujarat. In October 2002, the Supreme Court of India upheld the Election Commission's order to defer assembly elections in Gujarat.

== Publications ==
In 2004, Lyngdoh published a book titled "Chronicles of an Impossible Election". In this book he has dealt with the electoral process in India and the role of Election Commission. It is a chronicle of the assembly elections held in Jammu and Kashmir in the year 2002. It also discusses the Gujarat elections of 2002. The book received widespread acclaim and praise.

== View on Indian Politics and Politicians ==
Lyngdoh has frequently expressed his disdain for politics and politicians. After winning the Ramon Magasaysay Award, he was asked what advice he had for fellow bureaucrats. Lyngdoh said: "Keep away from politicians as they may spread cancer." In February 2004, in an interview, Lyngdoh had said: "Politicians by appointment only, all others are welcome to my house." In August 2002, Lyngdoh had said that "I think the politics today is dirty, vitiated and tendentious." Lyngdoh described politicians as a "cancer" which has no cure.

In 2013, J M Lyngdoh has expressed in views on "Decriminalization of Indian Electoral system" at the quarterly lecture series organised by the Centre of Public Policy Research (CPPR) supported by South Indian Bank

== Post-retirement ==
- He remains active in public life after retirement. He is one of the members of India Rejuvenation Initiative an Indian anti-corruption organisation formed by a group of retired and serving bureaucrats.
- In February 2011, Lyngdoh, while speaking to journalists after chairing a session on Free & Fair Elections – The Soul of Democracy, said state funding of elections is 'useless' and that a proportionate representation system where the electoral fight takes place between parties and not candidates would be more appropriate since it would involve significantly less expenditure.

In June 2012, Lyngdoh, while addressing a round table on "Indian Democracy & Elections – What is to be done?", said that a proportional representation system for at least 50 percent of the seats of the legislatures would reduce electoral malpractices. He explained that political parties would reduce the need to spend huge amounts of funds on elections of individuals if the switch to proportional representation is made. He opined that the Election Commission should take charge of even the internal elections of political parties since in his opinion that is the only way to ensure democracy.

== See also ==
- T.N. Seshan, former CEC of India
- Lalthara, fellow IAS officer from Northeast India
