= Croatia–India relations =

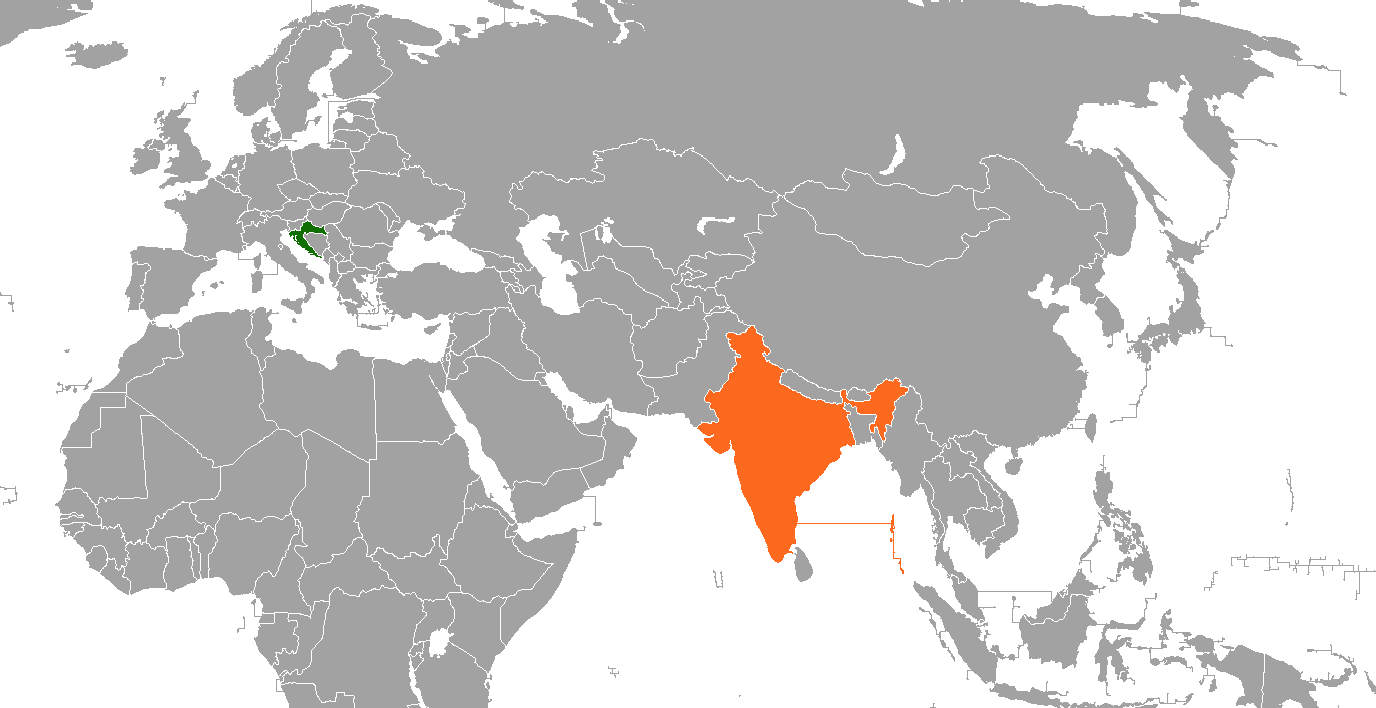

- Croatia: India

Diplomatic mission
- Embassy of Croatia in New Delhi: Embassy of India in Zagreb

Envoy
- Ambassador Petar Ljubičić: Ambassador; Arun Goel

Croatia and India officially established diplomatic relations on 9 July 1992 following the independence of Croatia. Croatia is represented in India through its embassy in New Delhi and two consulates in Mumbai and Kolkata. India is represented in Croatia through its embassy in Zagreb. Relations are warm and friendly with strengthening bilateral collaboration.

== History ==
Croatian sailors and merchants from the Republic of Ragusa in Dalmatia established contact with Goa, India, in the 16th century, then amidst Portuguese colonization. Between 1530 and 1535, adventurers from Dubrovnik joined the Portuguese to establish Sao Braz, a Ragusan colony in the modern-day village of Gandaulim. The colony was named after Saint Blaise, the patron saint of Dubrovnik. The 1667 Dubrovnik earthquake destroyed the city which left the Ragusan Republic financially strained and unable to maintain oversees territory. Trading disputes with Portuguese settlers and declining trade with Indians forced the Republic of Ragusa to surrender their colony. The Church of Saint Blaise in Goa is a common tourist attraction buoyed by Croatia–India relations. Since 1999, wealthy Croatian benefactors have donated to and refurbished local buildings. Since the 2000s, heritage tourism between Dubrovnik, Croatia and Gandaulim has increased, maintaining legacy ties.

Romani people were mentioned for the first time in the Republic of Ragusa in 1362 in some commercial records. Genetic findings in 2012 suggest the Romani people in Croatia originated in northwestern India and migrated to Europe as a group. Sushma Swaraj, Indian Minister of External Affairs, stated that the people of the Roma community in Croatia were to be recognized a part of the Indian diaspora.

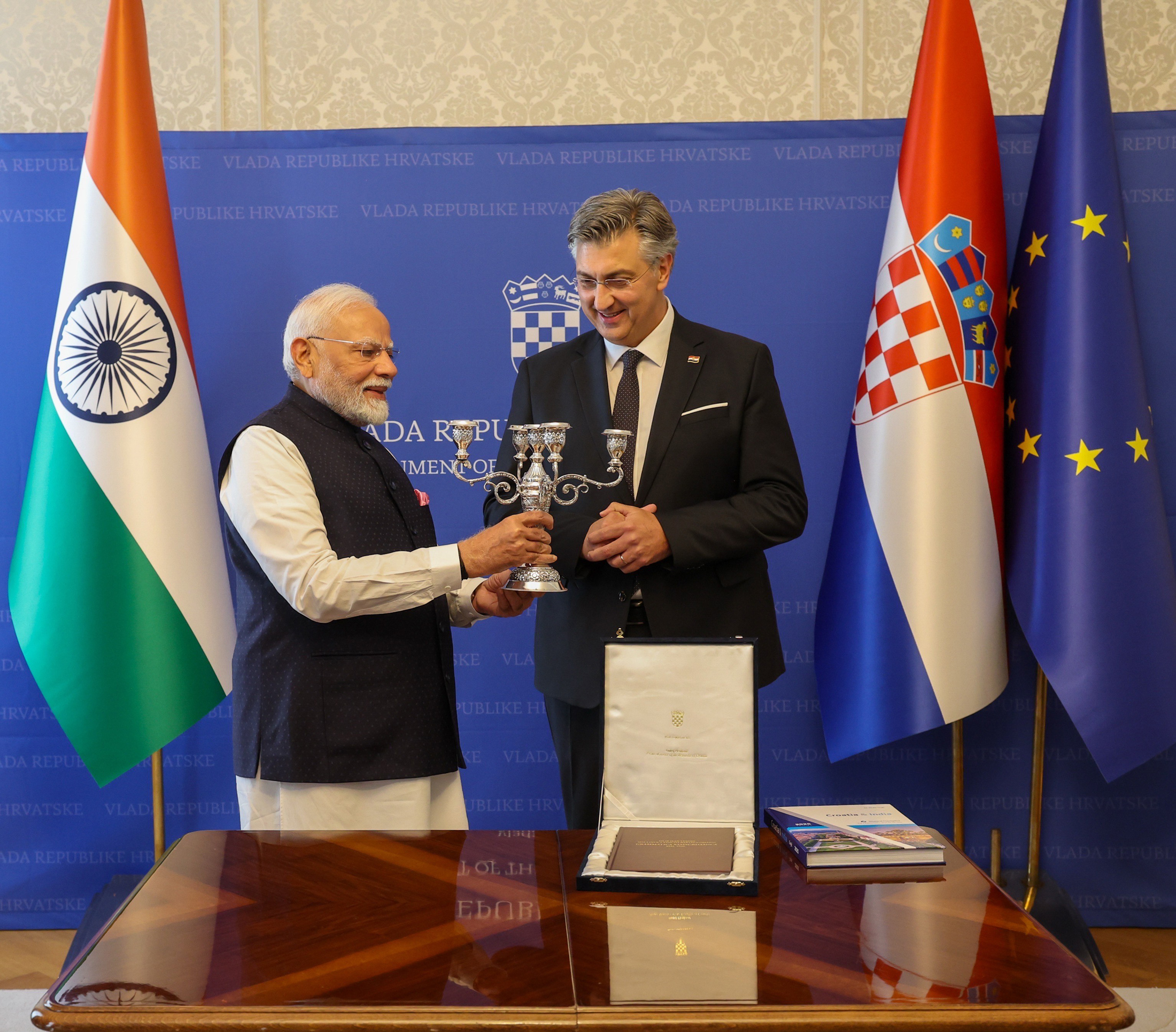
Indian Prime Minister Narendra Modi (left) meeting with Croatian Prime Minister Andrej Plenković (right) in 2025

=== Modern relations ===
In the first Indian diplomatic visit since Croatian independence, Prime Minister Narendra Modi met extensively with the Croatian government in 2025. This was the first visit of an Indian prime minister to Southeast Europe in nearly 60 years, since Indira Gandhi visited the region in 1967. Meeting with both Croatian President Zoran Milanović and Prime Minister Andrej Plenković, Modi emphasized Croatia's role as the Indian "gateway" to the region and their advocacy for Indian interests within the European Union. The Indian embassy in Zagreb was vandalized by Sikh separatists in 2026, part of a broader targeting of diplomatic missions across Europe. Plenković met with Modi that February in New Delhi, becoming the first Croatian prime minister to visit India.

== Military collaboration ==
The Croatian Armed Forces are part of the United Nations mediation of the India–Pakistan dispute in Kashmir and have deployed military personnel in both India and Pakistan since 2002. The Indian government announced increased investment into their joint defense industrial base in 2025.

== Economic activity ==
The Croatian government reported $242 million in trade with India in 2025, a 10% increase from the year prior. A year later, it was estimated that 15% of all non-EU foreign workers came to Croatia from India.

== Bilateral agreements ==
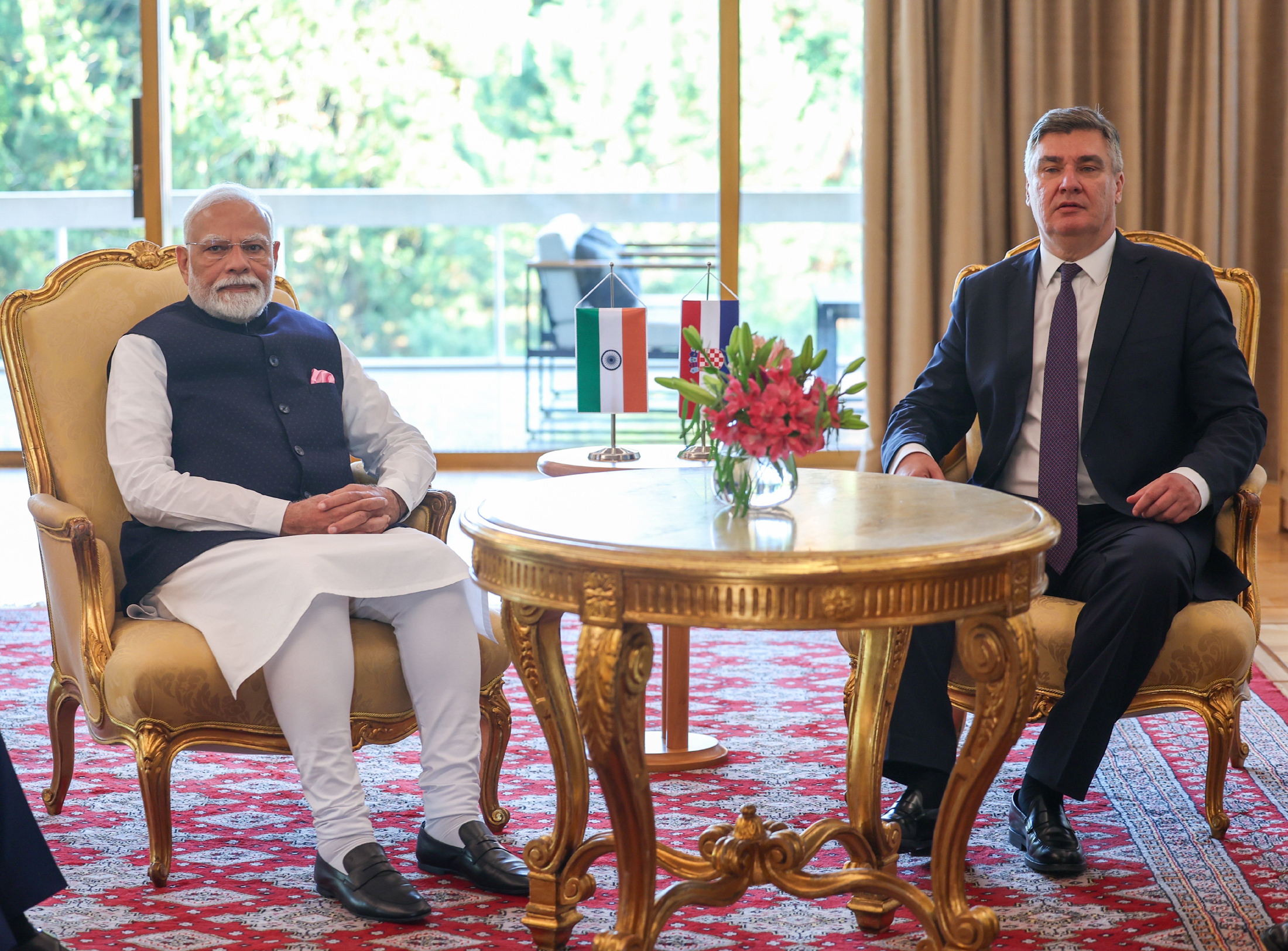
Indian Prime Minister Modi (left) with Croatian President Zoran Milanović (right) in Zagreb, 2025

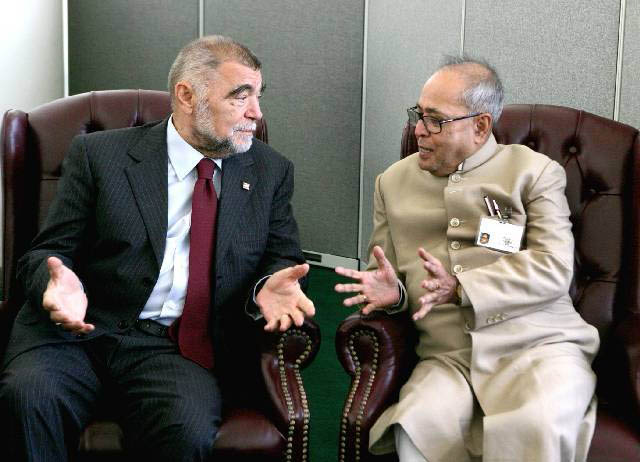
Indian Defence Minister Shri Pranab Mukherjee (right) with Croatian President Stjephan Mesić (left), 2006

The two nations have entered into a wide variety of bilateral agreements since the mid-1990s, focused on foreign investment, cultural understanding, education, and counterterrorism.

=== Agreements ===
- Trade and Economic Cooperation Agreement (1994)
- Maritime Transport Agreement (1997)
- Cooperation in the field of Culture, Science and Technology, Education and Sports (1999)
- Diplomatic Academy of the Ministry of Foreign Affairs of Croatia and the Foreign Service Institute (2000)
- Air Services Agreement (2000)
- Bilateral Investment Protection Agreement (2001)
- Cooperation in the Fight against International Illicit Trafficking of Narcotic Drugs, Terrorism (2001)
- Agreement on Agricultural Cooperation (2002)
- Agreement on exemption of visa requirement for Diplomatic Passports (2007)
- Cooperation in Health and Medicine (2010)
- Avoidance of Double Taxation and for the Prevention of Fiscal Evasion (2014)

=== Memorandums ===
- Croatian Bank for Reconstruction and Development and the EXIM Bank of India (2000)
- Export Credit & Guarantee Corporation of India and Croatian Bank for Reconstruction and Development (2002)
- Cooperation in Information Technology (2004)
- Exchange Programme in the field of Culture for 2005–07 (2005)
- Programme of Cooperation in Science and Technology for 2005–08 (2005)
- Educational Exchange Programme (2006)
- Programme of Cooperation in the field of Culture for 2010–12 (2010)
- University of Zagreb establishment of ICCR Chair of Hindi for 2012–2019 (2012)

== Diplomatic missions ==
- Croatia has an embassy in New Delhi
- India has an embassy in Zagreb

== See also ==
- Foreign relations of Croatia
- Foreign relations of India
- Brioni Meeting
