= Arun Goel =

Indian Ambassador to Croatia

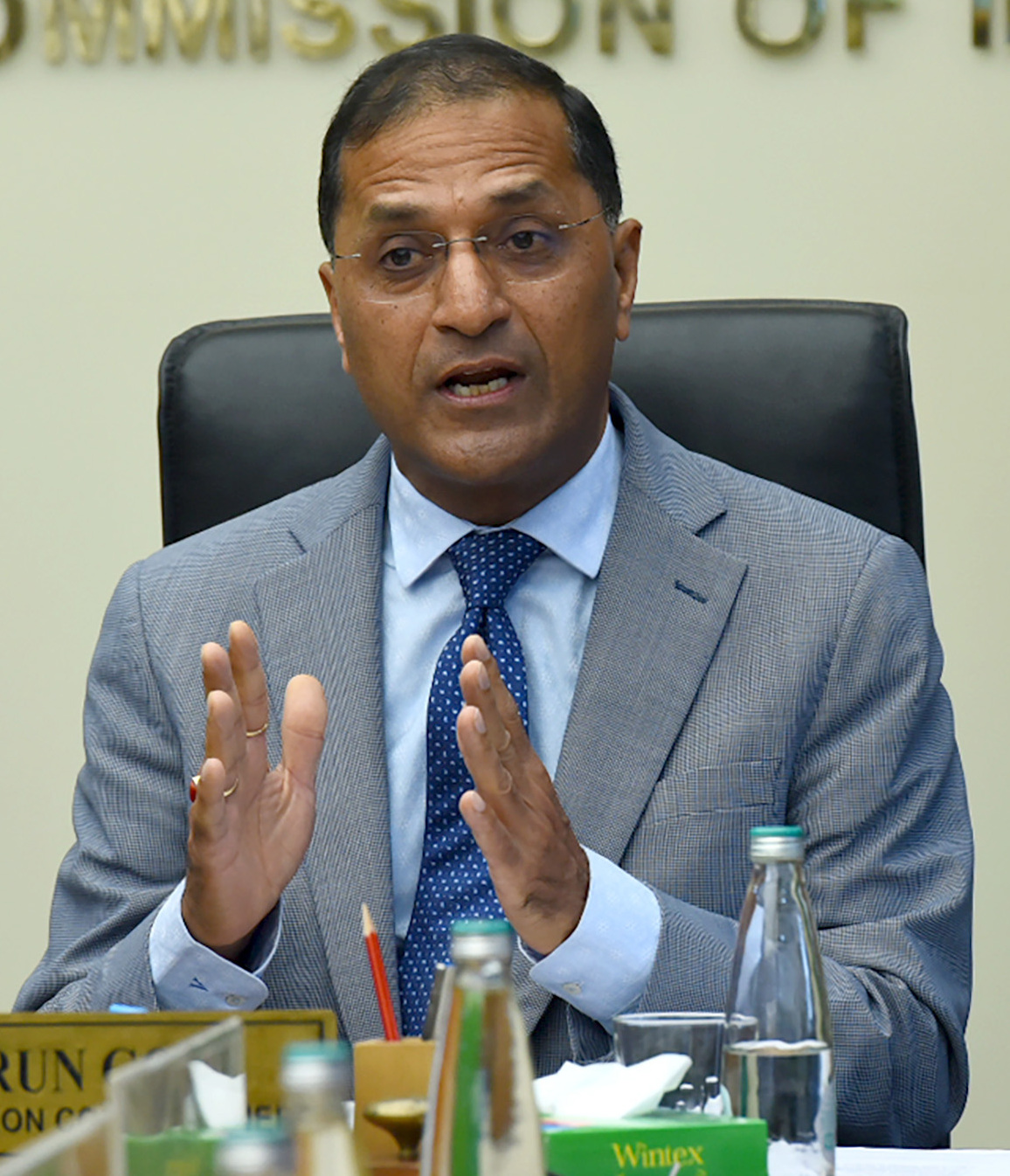
- Goel in 2024

Ambassador of India to Croatia
- Incumbent
- Assumed office 3 October 2024
- Preceded by: Raj Kumar Srivastava

Election Commissioner of India
- In office 19 November 2022 – 9 March 2024
- Preceded by: Rajiv Kumar
- Succeeded by: Sukhbir Singh Sandhu

Secretary of Heavy Industry of India
- In office 30 December 2019 – 18 November 2022
- Preceded by: Asha Ram Sihag
- Succeeded by: Kamran Rizvi

Secretary of Ministry of Culture
- In office 10 August 2018 – 30 December 2019
- Preceded by: Raghvendra Singh
- Succeeded by: Anand Kumar

Personal details
- Born: 7 December 1962 (age 63) Punjab, India
- Education: Punjabi University; Churchill College, Cambridge

Arun Goel (born 7 December 1962) is an Indian diplomat and former IAS officer who has served as Indian Ambassador to Croatia since 3 October 2024. He was previously an Election Commissioner of India from 2022 to 2024.

== Education ==
Goel completed his Msc in mathematics from Punjabi University and a master's degree in development economics from Churchill College, Cambridge.

== Career ==
Goel served as the Culture Secretary of India from 2018 to 2019. He served as a secretary of Heavy Industry of India from December 2019 to November 2022.

On 19 November 2022, he was appointed as Election Commissioner of India and assumed charge on 21 November 2022. His appointment has been challenged in the Indian Supreme Court due to procedural concerns but was given clearance on 3 August 2023. Thereafter, on 9 March 2024 he resigned from the post for personal reasons.

On 9 March 2024, Goel tendered his resignation from the position of Election Commissioner of India, which was accepted by the President. His resignation came just before the announcement of the dates for the 2024 Lok Sabha elections, leaving Chief Election Commissioner Rajiv Kumar as the sole election commissioner. A normally three-member Election Commission already had a vacancy, whereas, his tenure was till 6 December 2027.

He was appointed the Indian Ambassador to Croatia on 3 October 2024. The Indian embassy in Zagreb was vandalized by Sikh separatists in 2026, naming Goel as part of broader Indo-European efforts to deny their movement.

== See also ==
- Foreign relations of India
- Croatia–India relations
