= Reiek =

Mountain and tourist spot in Mizoram

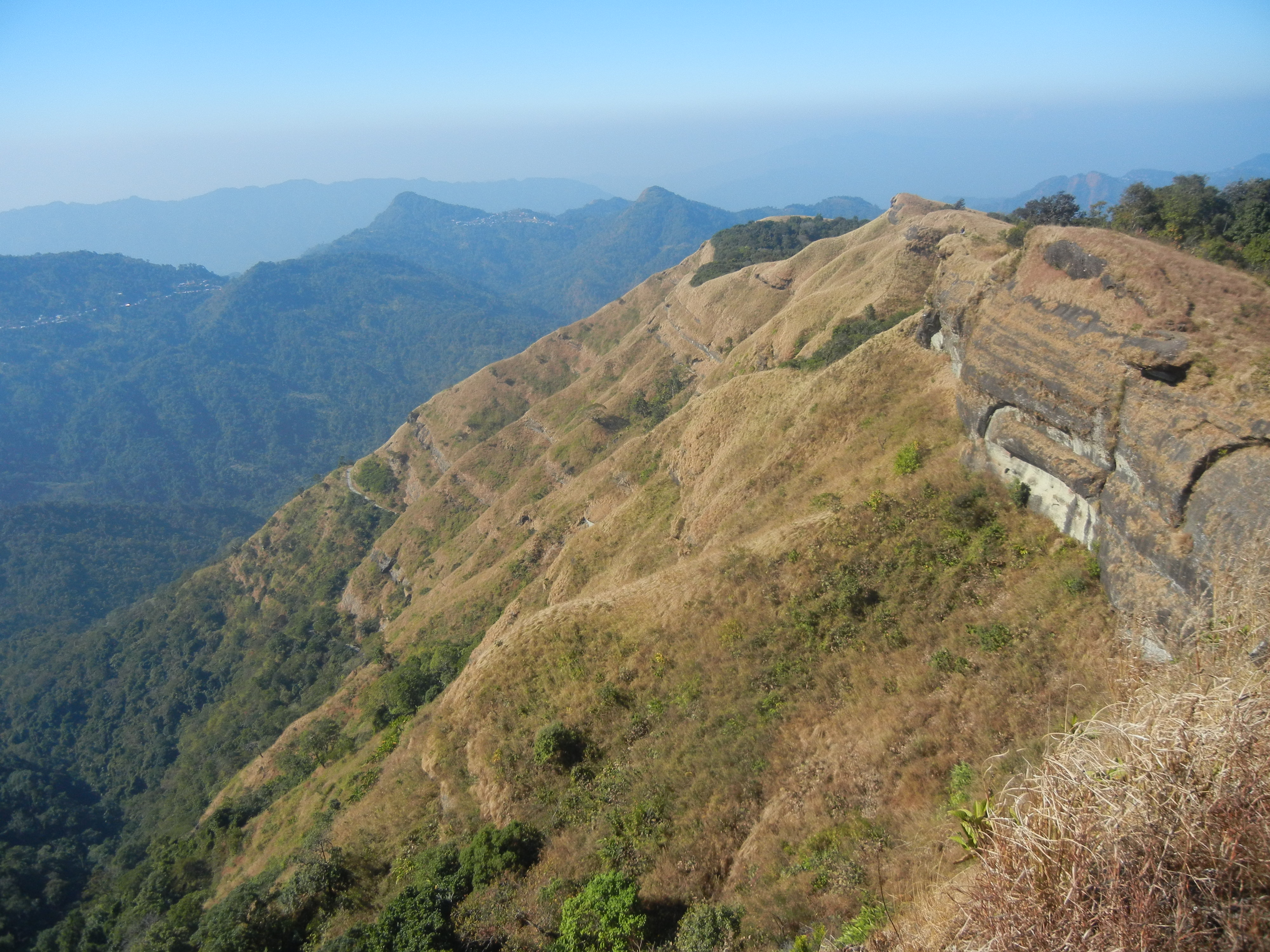
- Reiek Mountain

Highest point
- Elevation: 1,465 m (4,806 ft)
- Coordinates: 23.678°N 92.603°E

Geography
- Location: Aizawl District, Mizoram, India
- Parent range: Lushai Hills

Reiek is a mountain and tourist spot 29 km from Aizawl, Mizoram, India. It rests at an elevation of 1,465 metres overlooking Aizawl and offers a view of the surrounding valleys and hills. On a clear day, the plains of Bangladesh can be seen from the top of the hill. Reiek Hill is surrounded by thick lush green temperate trees and bushes.

== Geography ==
Reiek Tlang is a cuesta (a hill with a gentle slope on one side and a steep slope on the other) created by erosion of the Tertiary sand shale alterations.

== Culture ==
=== Heritage village ===
Reiek has a typical Mizo village consisting of the distinctive traditional huts of the different Mizo sub-tribes, Mizo chieftain's house, a bachelor's dormitory and that of a widow has been created and maintained by Tourism Department of Mizoram. The houses are fully furnished. A few Mizo modern houses have also been constructed nearby to show the changes that have taken place in the Mizo way of life in keeping pace with the modern developments. The department also has a cafeteria and a resort providing decent food and accommodation. This is also the venue for the annual Anthurium festival (September) and the best time to visit would be in April.

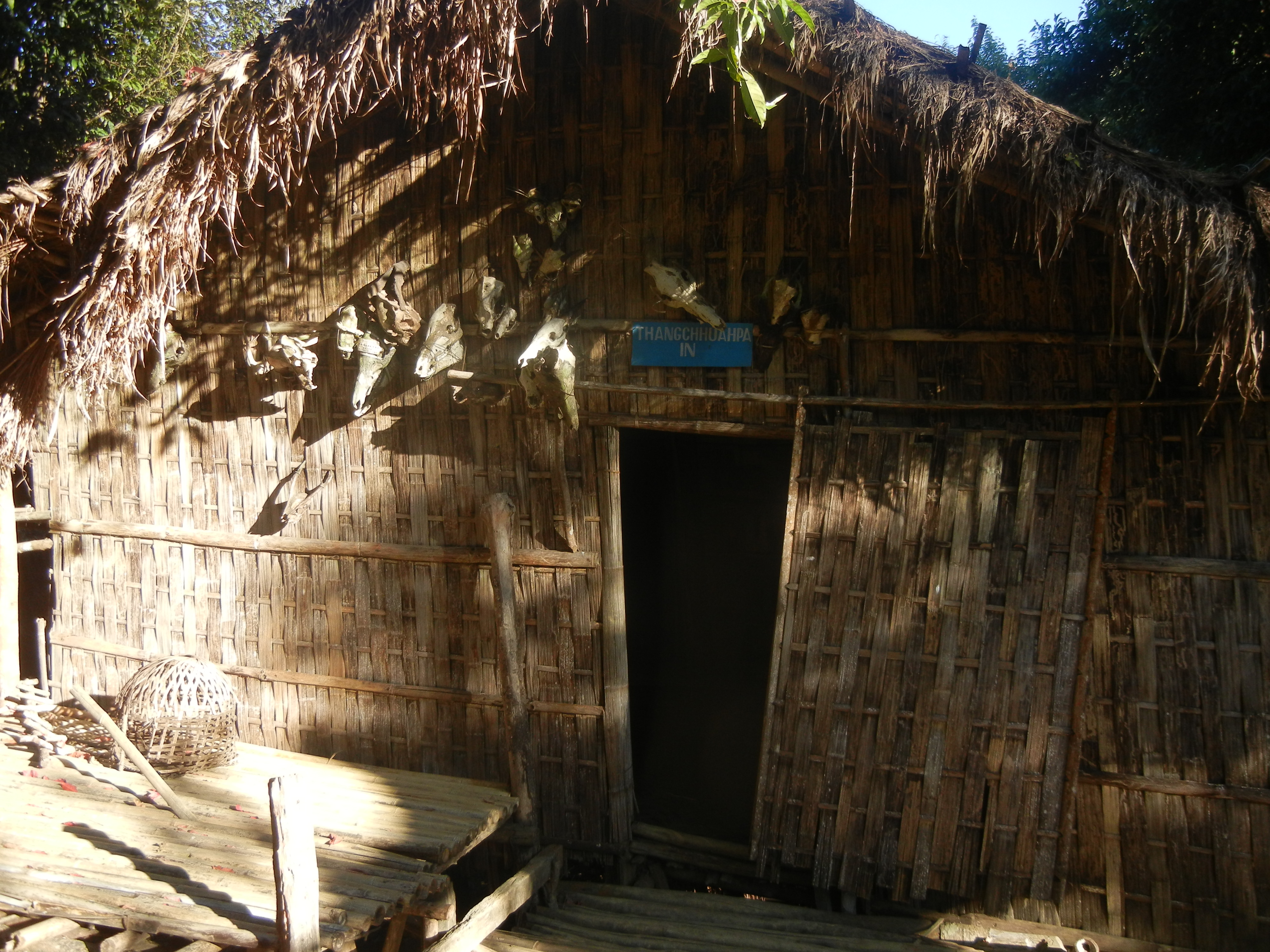
Reiek Heritage Village

=== Anthurium festival ===
Anthurium Festival is a festival promoting Anthurium grown in Mizoram and the rich Mizo customs and traditions at Reiek Tlang to tourists. The Anthurium Festival is organized every year by the Tourism Department and the Horticulture Department with financial support of the central government. It has a dual purpose — promoting the cultivation and marketing of the enthralling flower and attracting more tourists to the scenic beauties of Mizoram. The festival showcases the rich and rhythmic cultural dances and games of Mizoram. Fashion shows are also a regular feature of the festival.

== Ecology ==
=== Fauna ===
The forests in Reiek hills are home to a variety of hill birds, including the rare Peregrine falcon.

== See also ==
- Lalthara, a native of this village
- Tourism in Mizoram
