= S. L. Shakdher =

6th Chief Election Commissioner of India
- In office 1977–1982
- Preceded by: T. Swaminathan
- Succeeded by: R. K. Trivedi

Member of Parliament
- In office 3rd, 4th, 5th Lok Sabha

Personal details
- Died: 2002
- Occupation: Civil Servant

Shyam Lal Shakdher (1918–2002) was the 6th Chief Election Commissioner of India and former Secretary-General of 3rd Lok Sabha, 4th Lok Sabha and 5th Lok Sabha (Lower House of Parliament of India). He was Chief Election Commissioner from 1977 to 1982. He hailed from Jammu and Kashmir and was born into a Kashmiri Pandit family. He died in 2002. He was an Expert on Constitution matters and Parliamentary proceeding, he made significant contribution to adaptation and changes in Parliamentary procedures for efficient functioning of Lok Sabha. He has rich knowledge and wide experience in Parliamentary matters is symbolised by his treatise on Practice and Procedure of Parliament, co-authored with Subhash Kashyap, and other publications.

== Positions held ==
- Secretary, Lok Sabha, 1964–73
- Secretary-General, Lok Sabha, 1973–77
- Secretary-General of the Indian Parliamentary Group
