= B. B. Tandon =

14th Chief Election Commissioner of India

Brij Bihari Tandon
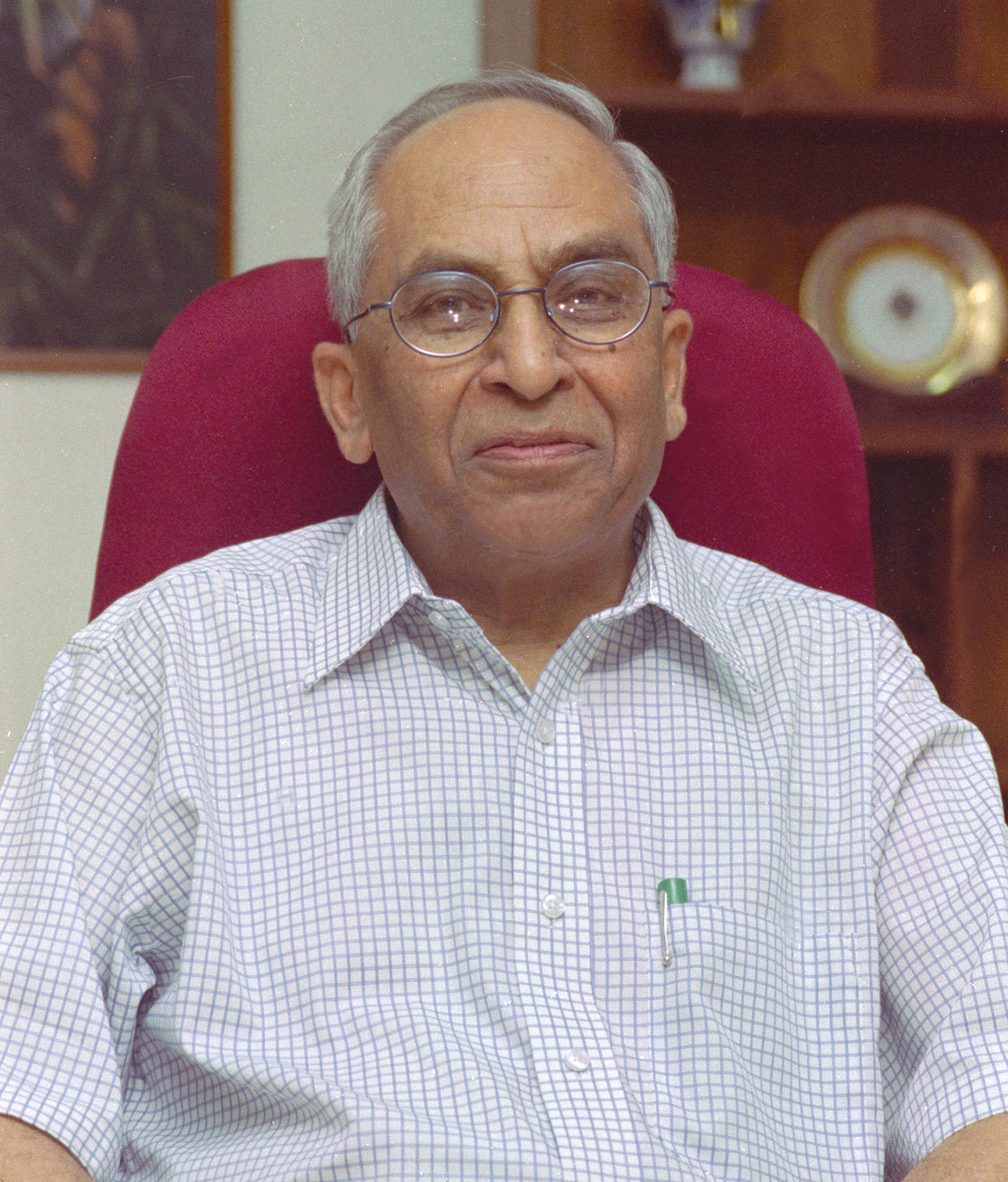

14th Chief Election Commissioner of India
- In office 16 May 2005 – 29 June 2006
- President: Dr. A. P. J. Abdul Kalam
- Prime Minister: Manmohan Singh
- Preceded by: T.S.Krishnamurthy
- Succeeded by: N. Gopalaswami

Personal details
- Occupation: civil servant

Brij Bihari Tandon is a retired Indian Administrative Service officer of 1965 batch belonging to the Himachal Pradesh cadre, who served as 14th Chief Election Commissioner of India from 16 May 2005 until 29 June 2006.

He joined as Election commissioner in June 2001.

Currently he is serving as Independent director in Filatex India Pvt Ltd.
