= N. Gopalaswami =

Indian civil servant (born 1944)

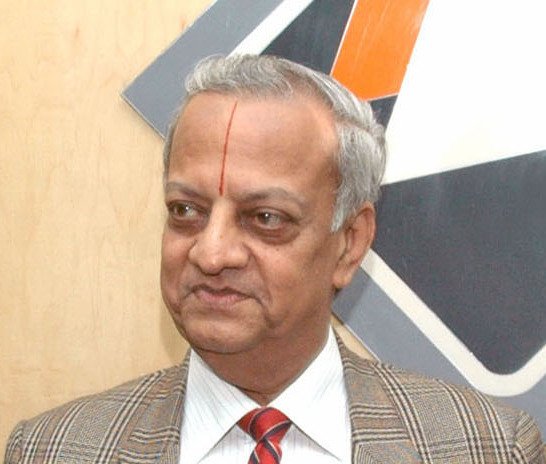
- N. Gopalaswami taking over as the Election Commissioner in New Delhi on 8 February 2004

15th Chief Election Commissioner of India
- In office 30 June 2006 – 20 April 2009
- President: Dr. A. P. J. Abdul Kalam; Pratibha Patil
- Prime Minister: Manmohan Singh
- Preceded by: Brij Bihari Tandon
- Succeeded by: Navin Chawla

Personal details
- Born: 21 April 1944 (age 82) Needamangalam, Tanjore District, Madras Province, British India (present day Thiruvarur District, Tamil Nadu, India)
- Education: Delhi University; St. Joseph's College, Tiruchirappalli
- Occupation: Retired IAS officer

N. Gopalaswami (born 21 April 1944), served as 15th Chief Election Commissioner of India (CEC) and has been awarded the Padma Bhushan in 2015. He is a 1966 batch Indian Administrative Services officer belonging to the Gujarat cadre. He took over the charge of CEC on 30 June 2006 and retired in April 2009. He is currently the president of Vivekananda Educational Society which runs a group of schools in and around Chennai. He was appointed as the Chairman of Kalakshetra for a term of five years starting from 22 October 2014, until 2019.

== Early life and education ==
Gopalaswami is from Needamangalam, Tiruvarur district, Tamil Nadu. He attended school in Mannargudi and his graduation in Chemistry from St. Joseph's College, Tiruchirappalli. Gopalaswamy is a post-graduate gold medalist in Chemistry from Delhi University and is a diploma holder in Urban Development Planning from University of London.

== Early career ==
Gopalaswami joined the Indian Administrative Service in 1966 and worked in various capacities in Gujarat. From 1967 to 1992, he held various top-level posts including that of the managing director, Gujarat Communication and Electronics Limited; as member (administration and purchase) in the Gujarat Electricity Board; secretary to Government (science & technology) in technical education and Secretary, Department of Revenue.

Earlier he was district magistrate in the districts of Kutch and Kheda; municipal commissioner Surat; director of relief; director of higher education and joint secretary (Home Department), Government of Gujarat.

== As a bureaucrat ==
Gopalaswami served the Government of India between 1992 and 2004. Prior to his appointment in the Election Commission of India, he was the Union Home Secretary and prior to that, he held the post of Secretary in the Department of Culture and Secretary General in the National Human Rights Commission.

Gopalaswami had also worked as an adviser (education) in the Planning Commission of India, joint secretary, department of electronics, in charge of the software development and industry promotion division and also the head of Software Technology Park of India (STPI) Society and SATCOMM India Society.

Gopalaswami was appointed as a Chancellor for Rashtriya Sanskrit Vidyapeetha, Deemed University, Tirupati on 21 October 2015 for a term of five years.

== Controversy ==
During his tenure as the Chief Election Commissioner N Gopalaswami on 31 January 2009 sent his recommendation for removal of Election Commissioner Navin Chawla to the President of India. He alleged that Chawla had discharged his duties as Election Commissioner in a partisan manner, seeking to further the interests of "one party." The CEC report contended that Chawla would take breaks during crucial meetings and secretly talk to functionaries of the Congress party and leak confidential details of the Election Commission. Chawla is also reported to have opposed the Election Commission's notice to Sonia Gandhi for her accepting foreign honours from Belgium.

N Gopalaswami's recommendation against Chawla has been politically controversial. However, the Indian government led by Congress Party (to which Chawla is accused of being favourable), rejected the CEC recommendation against Chawla on 1 March 2009. Thereafter, Navin Chawla took over as CEC of India on 20 April 2009 and concluded the 2009 General Elections to the Parliament of India.

N Gopalaswami moved to Supreme Court in April 2012 alleging a "communal conspiracy" behind the rejection of Army chief General VK Singh's claim for revision of his date of birth. The PIL, filed by retired Navy chief L Ramdas, former chief election commissioner N Gopalaswami, three senior former Army officials and others, said that ex-Army chief JJ Singh, currently the governor of Arunachal Pradesh, masterminded "Operation Moses" to clear the way for Lieutenant Gen Bikram Singh to succeed Gen Vijay Kumar Singh ^{(missing reference, likely an incorrect conspiracy theory)}.

== Personal life ==
When the Election Commission started the process of delimitations of constituencies, he (as CEC) suggested that Google maps be used for the arduous exercise. Gopalaswami played a key role in obtaining a grant of Rs 5 crore (Rs 50 million) from UNESCO for the preservation of Vedas, the ancient Hindu scriptures.
