= Lalthara =

Indian civil servant and writer

- Official Portrait of Lalthara c.2009

Chief Secretary of Nagaland
- In office 1 May 2009 – 31 December 2012
- Appointed by: K. Sankaranarayanan
- Preceded by: Lalhuma, IAS
- Succeeded by: Alemtemshi Jamir, IAS

Personal details
- Born: 1953 (age 72–73) Reiek, Mamit district, Mizoram

Lalthara (born 1953) is a retired 1975 batch IAS officer, elder and author who served as the Chief Secretary of Nagaland from 1 May 2009 till 31 December 2012. He later served as Sr Principal Secretary-cum-Adviser to 3 consecutive Chief Ministers of Nagaland for almost 5 years.

== Early life ==
Lalthara was born in Reiek village. His schooling days coincided with the Mizo insurgency with his house and many schools burnt down. After completing his bachelor's degree in Shillong at 20, Lalthara appeared for the Indian Police Service exams as the minimum age required was 20, while for IAS exams it was 21. He ranked 20th on the IPS merit list, the highest ranked achieved by an SC/ST candidate till then. He later cleared the IAS exam and was allotted the Nagaland Cadre.

== Career in Nagaland ==
Lalthara served the Government of Nagaland in various capacities as an IAS Officer for 37 years. Notably, he was the Deputy Commissioner, Wokha during the 1985 Merapani Incident. He became Chief Secretary of Nagaland succeeding Lalhuma, IAS (Retd.). He served as Chief Secretary for more than 2 years and retired, after reaching superannuation, on 31 December, 2012.

== Post-Retirement ==
After retirement, Lalthara was appointed as the first Advisor-cum-Sr. Principal Private Secretary to the Chief Minister. This post was created to mirror the post of Principal Secretary to the Prime Minister of India, and heads the Chief Minister's Office.
