= S. Y. Quraishi =

17th Chief Election Commissioner of India

Shahabuddin Yaqoob Quraishi
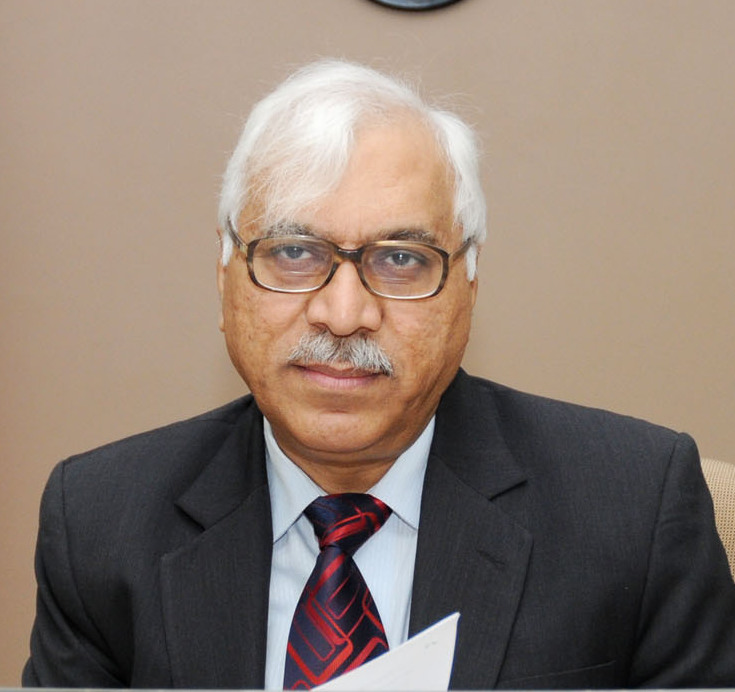

17th Chief Election Commissioner of India
- In office 30 July 2010 – 10 June 2012
- President: Pratibha Patil
- Prime Minister: Manmohan Singh
- Preceded by: Navin Chawla
- Succeeded by: V. S. Sampath

Personal details
- Born: 11 June 1947 (age 79) Delhi, British India
- Education: St. Stephen's College, Delhi; Delhi University; Jamia Millia Islamia
- Profession: Civil servant

Shahabuddin Yaqoob Quraishi (born 11 June 1947) is a retired IAS officer who served as 17th Chief Election Commissioner (CEC) of India. He was appointed as the CEC as the successor to Navin Chawla on 30 July 2010.

He has also served as a Secretary in the Ministry of Youth Affairs and Sports. He has been listed among the 100 most influential Muslims in India- 2025 by Muslim Mirror.

== Career ==
He is an IAS officer of the 1971 batch from Haryana cadre. He has a PhD in communications and social marketing.

Quraishi became the first Muslim to be the CEC of India. He demitted office on 10 June 2012.

=== Key electoral reforms ===
Quraishi introduced four major reforms that have endured:

1. Voter Education Division and SVEEP: He set up a dedicated Voter Education Division and launched the Systematic Voters' Education and Electoral Participation (SVEEP) programme. Since 2010, every election has recorded historic voter turnout.

2. Expenditure and London in UK.

Monitoring Division: To curb black money, he established the Expenditure Monitoring Division. The EC seized crores of rupees during elections, with the amount later rising to hundreds of crores.

3. National Voters' Day: He launched National Voters' Day on 25 January 2011 to encourage enrolment among young voters aged He has authored a book titled 'An Undocumented Wonder – the Making of the Great Indian Election', a book that describes the enormity and complexity of the Indian election and a book titled Old Delhi- Living Traditions a coffee table book on the heritage city and its social and cultural life. His latest book The Population Myth reveals how the right-wing spin to population data has given rise to myths about the 'Muslim rate of growth', often used to stoke majoritarian fears of a demographic skew. The book busts myths about Islam and family planning.

He figured in The Indian Express list of 100 Most Powerful Indians of 2011 and again in 2012

He now pursues his interests in academics by teaching & mentoring at Cluster Innovation Centre, University of Delhi in the capacity of Honorary Professor at the centre. He is also a current member of the International Elections Advisory Council.

While responding to Karan Thapar on the Devil's Advocate programme on the television channel CNN-IBN, he opposed the ideas of Right to Recall and Right to Reject advocated by Anna Hazare as not possible in India. However, after some time in a TV interview he said that the Right to Reject can be considered.

Dr. S Y Quraishi was awarded the Honorary Fellowship of the National Indian Students Union UK in May 2016. He joined Shabana Azmi and Javed Akhtar who were the first recipients of the Fellowship.

== Books ==
- An Undocumented Wonder: The Making of the Great Indian Election (2014) – Rupa Publications, 434 pages. A first-person account of the recent electoral history of India, describing how the Election Commission of India conducts elections on an unprecedented scale, overcoming geography and diversity. The book answers how India emerged as the ‘Global Gold Standard’ in conducting elections.
- The Great March of Democracy: Seven Decades of India’s Elections (2019) – Edited collection.
- The Population Myth: Islam, Family Planning and Politics in India (2021)
- India’s Experiment with Democracy: The Life of a Nation Through its Elections (2023)
- India and I: A Hundred Memories, Not a Memoir published by Hachette India on 16 July 2026.
