= Chief Election Commissioner of India =

Constitutional post to the Government of India

- Logo of The Election Commission of India

- Incumbent; Gyanesh Kumar since 19 February 2025
- Election Commission of India
- Type: Chief Election Commissioner
- Status: Head of the Election Commission of India
- Nominator: Union Council of Ministers
- Appointer: President of India
- Term length: 6 years or up to age of 65 years (whichever is earlier)
- Inaugural holder: Sukumar Sen
- Deputy: Election Commissioners of India; Deputy Election Commissioners of India
- Salary: ₹250,000 (US$2,600) per month
- Website: Election Commission of India

The Chief Election Commissioner of India (CEC) heads the Election Commission of India, a body constitutionally empowered to conduct free and fair elections. An election commissioner is appointed by the president of India on the recommendation of a three-member selection committee headed by the prime minister and consisting of the leader of the opposition and a Union Cabinet minister. The selection process of the Election Commission is dominated by the government, which has implications for its independence following amendment in 2023.

The term of a CEC can be a maximum of six years or until they attain sixty-five years of age. The chief election commissioner is usually a member of the Indian Civil Service and mostly from the Indian Administrative Service.

The chief election commissioner is placed at 9A position in the order of precedence in India along with the chairperson of Union Public Service Commission and the comptroller and auditor general of India.

== Role and powers ==
Chief election commissioner of India (CEC) heads the Election Commission of India, a body constitutionally empowered to conduct free and fair elections to the national legislature, state legislatures, President and Vice President. This power of the Election Commission of India is derived from the Article 324 of the Constitution of India. The chief election commissioner is usually a member of the Indian Civil Service and mostly from the Indian Administrative Service. The Election Commission of India consists of a chief election commissioner and two election commissioners. The chief election commissioner does not have overruling powers and any decision is taken by the opinion of the majority among the three.

== Appointment and term of office ==
The appointment and term of the chief election commissioner are prescribed in the Chief Election Commissioner and Other Election Commissioners (Appointment, Conditions of Service and Term of Office) Act, 2023. As per Section 7 of the act, an election commissioner is appointed by the president of India on the recommendation of a selection committee headed by the Prime Minister and consisting of the Leader of the Opposition in Lok Sabha and a member of the Union Council of Ministers to be nominated by the prime minister. The senior most member of the election commission is appointed as the chief election commissioner by the president.

The term of the CEC can be a maximum of six years from the date on which they assume their office. However, the CEC retires from office if they attain the age of sixty-five years before the expiry of the term.

The CEC can be removed from the office through the process of impeachment, requiring a two-thirds majority of the Lok Sabha and the Rajya Sabha to be present and voting for the same.

== Compensation ==
As per the Election Commission (Condition Of Service Of Election Commissions And Transaction Of Business) Act, 1991, the salary of the chief election commissioner is the same as salary of a judge of Supreme Court of India. The CEC draws a monthly salary of ₹250,000 (US$2,600) plus allowances.

== List of chief election commissioners ==
The following have held the post of the chief election commissioner of India.

S.No.	Name	Portrait	Assumed Office	Left Office	Time in Office
1	Sukumar Sen		21 March 1950	19 December 1958	8 years, 273 days
2	Kalyan Sundaram		20 December 1958	30 September 1967	8 years, 284 days
3	S. P. Sen Verma		1 October 1967	30 September 1972	4 years, 365 days
4	Nagendra Singh		1 October 1972	6 February 1973	128 days
5	T. Swaminathan		7 February 1973	17 June 1977	4 years, 10 days
6	S. L. Shakdhar		18 June 1977	17 June 1982	4 years, 364 days
7	R. K. Trivedi		18 June 1982	31 December 1985	3 years, 196 days
8	R. V. S. Peri Sastri		1 January 1986	25 November 1990	4 years, 328 days
9	V. S. Ramadevi		26 November 1990	11 December 1990	16 days
10	T. N. Seshan		12 December 1990	11 December 1996	6 years
11	M. S. Gill		12 December 1996	13 June 2001	4 years 69 days
12	J. M. Lyngdoh		14 June 2001	7 February 2004	2 years 269 days
13	T. S. Krishnamurthy		8 February 2004	15 May 2005	1 year 69 days
14	B. B. Tandon		16 May 2005	29 June 2006	269 days
15	N. Gopalaswami		30 June 2006	20 April 2009	2 years, 294 days
16	Navin Chawla		21 April 2009	29 July 2010	1 year 89 days
17	S. Y. Quraishi		30 July 2010	10 June 2012	1 year 316 days
18	V. S. Sampath		11 June 2012	15 January 2015	2 year 218 days
19	Harishankar Brahma		16 January 2015	18 April 2015	92 days
20	Nasim Zaidi		19 April 2015	5 July 2017	2 years 77 days
21	Achal Kumar Jyoti		6 July 2017	22 January 2018	200 days
22	Om Prakash Rawat		23 January 2018	1 December 2018	312 days
23	Sunil Arora		2 December 2018	12 April 2021	2 years, 131 days
24	Sushil Chandra		13 April 2021	14 May 2022	1 year, 31 days
25	Rajiv Kumar		15 May 2022	18 February 2025	2 years, 279 days
26	Gyanesh Kumar		19 February 2025	Incumbent	1 year, 241 days

== Reforms ==
The Election Commission of India was a single member body till 1989 when two election commissioners were appointed to aid the chief election commissioner. While the office has always been an important one in the machinery of the Indian political process, it gained significant public attention during the tenure of T.N. Seshan, from 1990 to 1996. Seshan is widely credited with enforcing the powers of the election commission strongly and undertaking a zealous effort to end corruption and manipulation in Indian elections.

In June 2012, former deputy prime minister and former leader of the opposition in Indian Parliament, Lal Krishna Advani, suggested that appointment of CEC (as well as the comptroller and auditor general (CAG)) should be made by a bipartisan collegium consisting of the prime minister, the chief justice, the law minister and the leaders of the opposition in the Lok Sabha and the Rajya Sabha. As per Advani, the demand was to remove any impression of bias or lack of transparency and fairness because the existent system was open to manipulation and partisanship. Subsequently, the former chief minister of Tamil Nadu, M Karunanidhi, also supported the suggestion. Similar recommendations were made by former CEC's such as B B Tandon, N Gopalaswamy and S Y Quraishi.

== See also ==
- 2026 anti-CEC protests
