= Election Commissioner of India =

Members of the body overseeing elections

- Flag of India
- Incumbent; Sukhbir Singh Sandhu; Vivek Joshi since 14 March 2024 & 19 February 2025
- Type: Election Commissioner
- Status: Deputy Head of the Election Commission of India
- Reports to: Parliament of India
- Seat: Nirvachan Sadan, Ashoka Road, New Delhi, India
- Appointer: President of India
- Term length: 6 years or at the age of 65 (whichever is earlier)
- Inaugural holder: V.S. Seigell; S. S. Dhanoa
- Salary: ₹250,000 (US$2,600)
- Website: Election Commission of India

The Election Commissioners of India are the members of Election Commission of India, a body constitutionally empowered to conduct free and fair elections in India. An election commissioner is appointed by the President of India on the recommendation of a selection committee headed by the prime minister and comprising the leader of the opposition in the Lok Sabha and a member of the union cabinet nominated by the prime minister. The term of an election commissioner can be a maximum of six years or till he/she attains sixty five years of age. Election Commissioners are usually members of the Indian Civil Service.

== History ==
Since 1950, the Election Commission of India was a single member body with only the Chief Election Commissioner. As per The Election Commissioner Amendment Act, 1989, the Commission was made a multi-member body with two additional election commissioners who were appointed to the commission for the first time on 16 October 1989. On 1 January 1990, the post of election commissioners were abolished again. The Election Commission was once again made as a three member body on 1 October 1993.

== Role and powers ==
The election commissioners form part of the Election Commission of India, a body constitutionally empowered to conduct free and fair elections to the national, the state legislatures, President and Vice-President. This power of the Election Commission of India is derived from the Article 324 of the Constitution of India. Election Commissioners are usually members of the Indian Civil Service. The Election Commission of India consists of a chief election commissioner and two election commissioners. The chief election commissioner does not have overruling powers and any decision is taken by the opinion of the majority among the three.

== Appointment and term of office ==
=== Appointment ===
Election commissioners are appointed by the president of India, on the recommendation of a three-member committee, named the Selection Committee, through a majority vote. Prior to this, the committee consisted of the prime minister of India, the chief justice of India, and the leader of opposition in the Lok Sabha.

Controversially, the Chief Election Commissioner and other Election Commissioners (Appointment, Conditions of Service and Term of Office) Act of 2023 replaced the role of the chief justice in the Selection Committee with a union minister, nominated by the prime minister, thus giving the ruling government a dominant role in the appointments of ECI, as was the case before SC order in 2023. The act also stated that those appointed should have previously held secretary-level positions in the government and be "persons of integrity, who have knowledge of and experience in management and conduct of elections."

=== Tenure ===
The term of the CEC can be a maximum of six years from the date on which he/she assumes his office. However, the CEC retires from office if he/she attains the age of sixty-five years before the expiry of the term.

=== Removal ===
While the CEC can only be removed by office through the process of impeachment requiring two-thirds majority of the Lok Sabha and the Rajya Sabha to be present and voting for the same, election commissioners can be removed by the President on the recommendation of the CEC. In 2009, Chief Election Commissioner N. Gopalaswami sent a recommendation to the then President Pratibha Patil to remove Election Commissioner Navin Chawla due to his partisan behavior in favor of a particular political party. The President opined that such a recommendation is not binding on the president and rejected the same.

== Compensation ==
As per the Election Commission (Condition Of Service Of Election Commissions And Transaction Of Business) Act, 1991, the salary of an election commissioner is the same as salary of a Judge of Supreme Court of India. The CEC draws a monthly salary of ₹250,000 (US$2,600) plus allowances.

== List of Election Commissioners ==
Election commissioners who have not held the office of CEC
Name	Took office	Left office	Span
V. S. Seigell	16 October 1989	2 January 1990	78 days
S. S. Dhanoa	16 October 1989	2 January 1990	78 days
G.V.G. Krishnamurty	1 October 1993	30 September 1999	5 years, 364 days
Ashok Lavasa	23 October 2018	31 October 2020	1 year, 313 days
Anup Chandra Pandey	9 June 2021	14 February 2024	2 years, 250 days
Arun Goel	19 November 2022	9 March 2024	1 year, 111 days
Sukhbir Singh Sandhu	14 March 2024	Incumbent	2 years, 223 days
Vivek Joshi	19 February 2025	Incumbent	1 year, 246 days

== See also ==
- History of democracy in the Indian-subcontinent
- 2025 Indian electoral controversy
- 2026 Indian electoral controversy
- 2026 anti-CEC protests
